= Sierra del Carmen =

Mountain range in Coahuila, Mexico

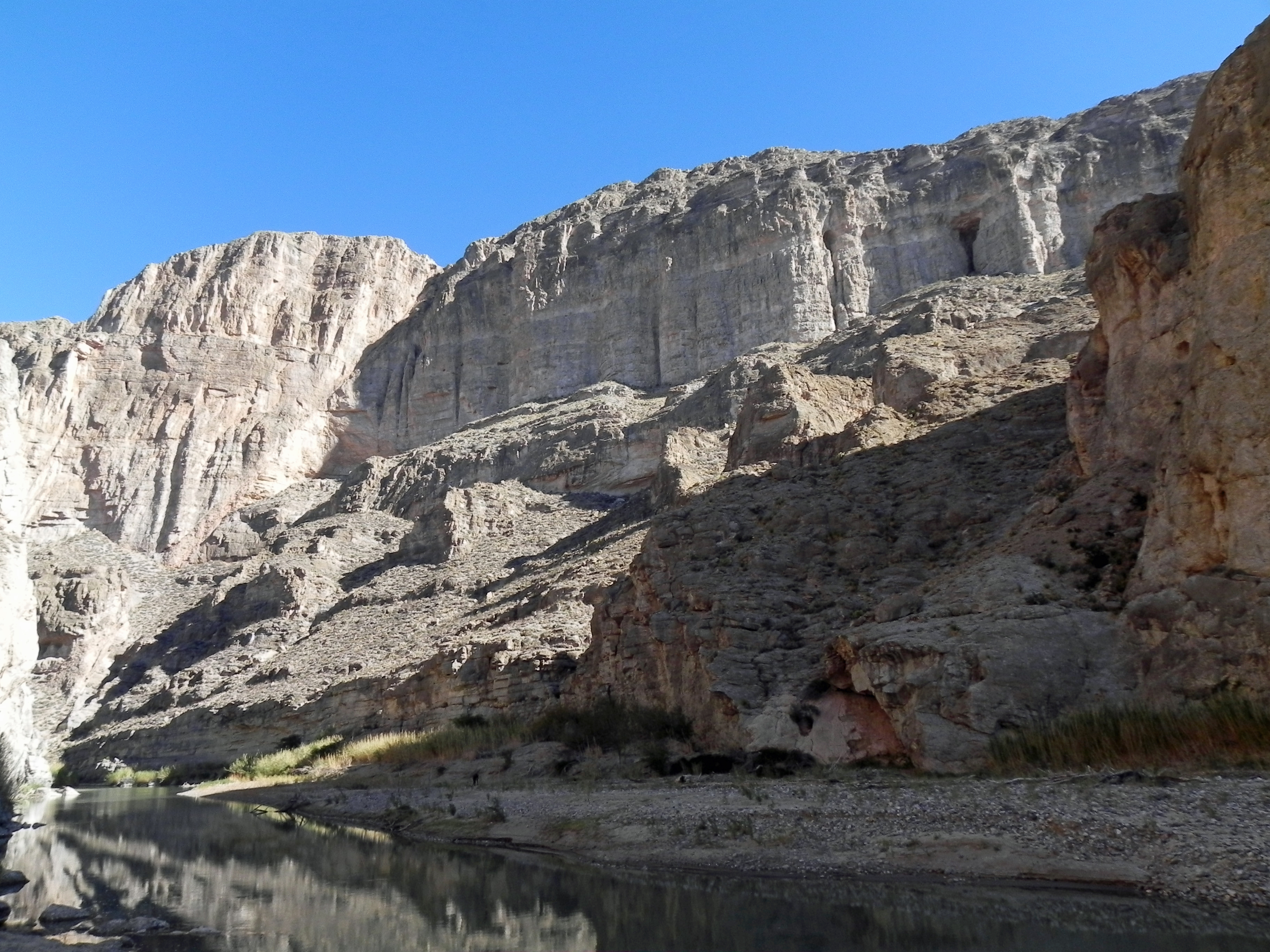
- Boquillas Canyon

Highest point
- Elevation: 2,720 m (8,920 ft)
- Prominence: 1,360 m (4,460 ft)
- Coordinates: 29.03158°N 102.61473°W

Geography
- Location within Mexico Location within Coahuila
- Countries: Mexico, United States
- State(s): Coahuila, Texas
- Parent range: Sierra Madre Oriental

The Sierra del Carmen, also called the Sierra Maderas del Carmen, is a northern finger of the Sierra Madre Oriental in the state of Coahuila, Mexico. The Sierra begins at the Rio Grande at Big Bend National Park and extends southeast for about 72 kilometres (45 mi), reaching a maximum elevation of 2,720 metres (8,920 ft). Part of the Sierra del Carmen is protected in the Maderas del Carmen Biosphere Reserve as part of a bi-national effort to conserve a large portion of the Chihuahua Desert in Mexico and Texas.

== Geography ==
Some authorities include the Chisos and other mountains of Big Bend National Park as part of the Sierra del Carmen. From the Mexican side of the Rio Grande, the Sierra runs southeast for about 72 kilometres (45 mi) to 28’ 40° North latitude and a maximum width of about 32 kilometres (20 mi). Elevations increase toward the south culminating in several peaks with heights of more than 2,400 metres (8,000 ft) and a maximum altitude of 2,720 metres (8,920 ft). The western side of the Sierra del Carmen features a high limestone escarpment that formed along a fault line.

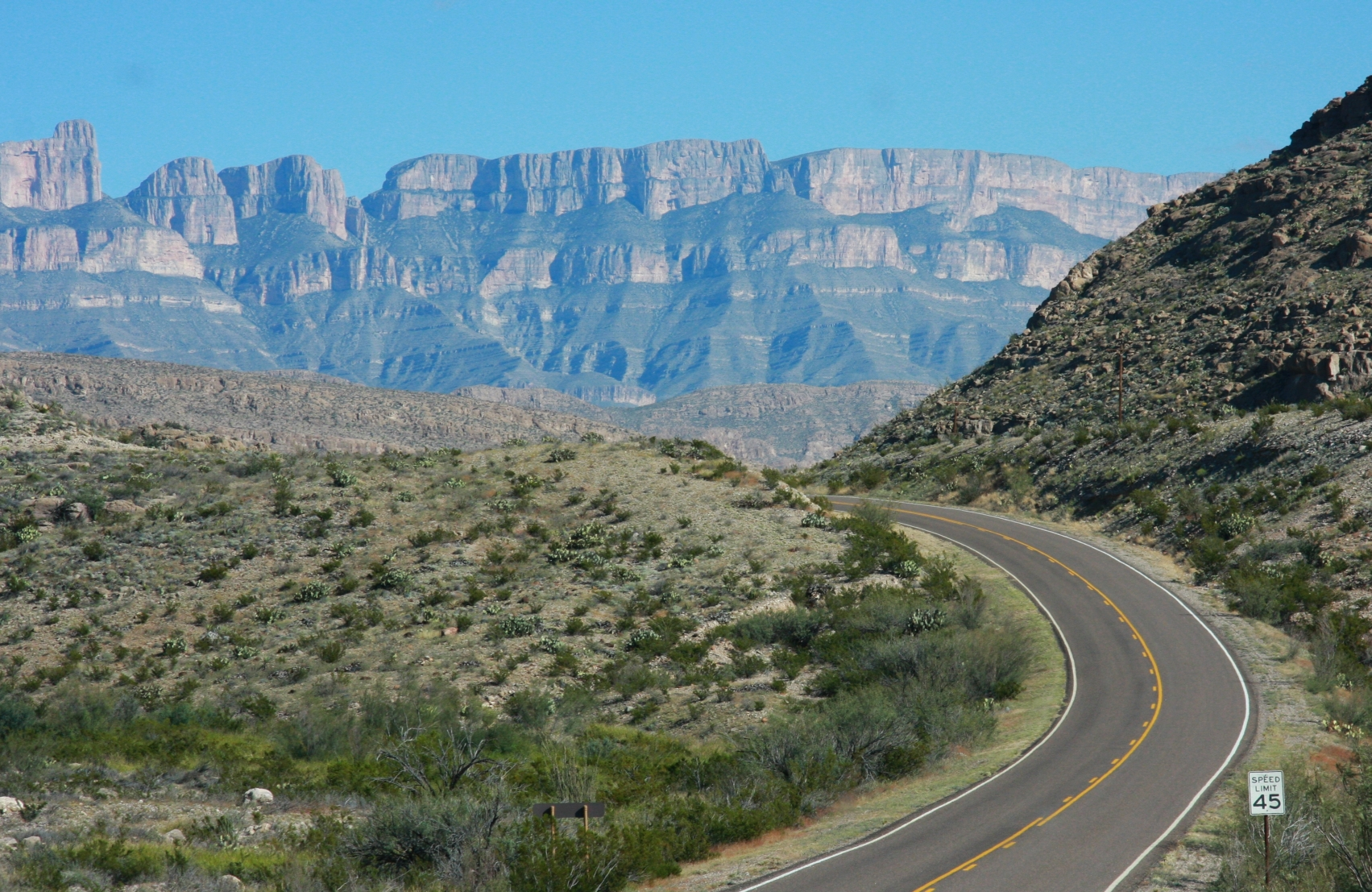
The Sierra del Carmen seen from the Big Bend in Texas.

The Sierra del Carmen is an isolated range, a sky island, that rises above the Chihuahua Desert. Because of its elevation, higher than any other mountain ranges in the Bolson de Mapimi, the Sierra del Carmen is home to flora and fauna that are more characteristic of the mountains of the western United States and Mexico. At lower elevations, desert vegetation surrounds the higher elevations. Oak and oak-pine forests are found at elevations of 1,300 to 1,800 metres (4,400 to 5,900 ft). Above 1,800 metres (5,900 ft), the forest is dominated by pine. Conifer species such as Douglas fir, and Durango fir are found at elevations of 2,000 metres (6,600 ft) or more.

The Sierra del Carmen is home to 446 species of birds, 3,600 species of insects, more than 1,500 plant species, and 75 mammals. Among the mammals are American black bear, beaver, and cougar. A small subspecies of white-tail deer, the Carmen Mountains white-tailed deer is found in the Sierra. Extirpated from the region and not at present found in the Sierra are Grizzly bear and the Mexican wolf.

There are no rivers, paved highways, or towns in the Sierra, which has been called one of the most remote places on earth. Drainage of the mountains is by small, mostly ephemeral streams on the east side of the Sierra to the Rio Grande. Off the western side of the Sierra, small streams leaving the mountains disappear quickly in the desert of the Bolson de Mapimi.

== Vegetation ==
According to the International Ecological Classification Standard the vegetation of Sierra del Carmen can be classified as follows

Temperate or subpolar needle-leaved evergreen forest

Madrean Lower Montane Conifer Forest: Dominant trees are Arizona pine often growing with Chisos red oak, Silverleaf oak and Netleaf oak in association with Poverty oatgrass, Piptochaetium pringlei, Prairie Junegrass, Little bluestem and Bromus lanatipes.

Madrean Upper Montane Conifer Forest: Durango fir and Douglas fir are the dominant trees growing along Pinus arizonica, Silverleaf oak, Texas madrone in association with Umbellate wintergreen and Piptochaetium pringlei.

Sierra Madre Oriental endemic Pinus stylesii grows on the higher elevations, Chinquapin oak is also common although not dominant component throughout mixed conifer forest to oak–pine forest, Quaking aspen stands exist on moist slopes and canyons, thickets of Red raspberry and hawthorns such as Crataegus tracyi and Crataegus greggiana provide forage for wildlife.

Montane or boreal cold-deciduous forest

Madrean Upper Montane Oak Forest: The dominant tree species is Chisos red oak growing among other oaks such as Lacey oak, Arizona white oak, Silverleaf oak in association with Piptochaetium fimbriatum, Piptochaetium pringlei, Muhlenbergia emersleyi, Nolina texana and Little bluestem

Temperate broad-leaved evergreen woodland

Madrean Lower Montane Oak Woodland: Silverleaf oak, Arizona white oak, Quercus grisea and Emory oak are dominant trees, associates are Netleaf oak, Muhlenbergia glauca, Senecio carlomasonii, Pointleaf manzanita, Little bluestem, Sideoats grama, Blue grama, Alder-leaf mountain-mahogany, Muhlenbergia emersleyi, Mexican feathergrass and Yucca faxoniana.

At least 20 species of oak grow in Sierra del Carmen, making it one of the most oak diverse sky islands, the following have been reported within its boundaries: Arizona oak, Quercus coahuilensis, Quercus carmenensis, Emory oak, Escarpment live oak, Gambel oak, Chisos red oak, Quercus grisea, Silverleaf oak, Lacey oak, Mohr oak, Chinquapin oak, Quercus sinuata, Sonoran blue oak, Quercus sideroxyla, Sandpaper oak, Coahuila scrub oak, Lateleaf oak, Quercus vaseyana and Netleaf oak.

Temperate or subpolar needle-leaved evergreen woodland

Madrean Pinyon-Juniper Woodland: Mexican pinyon, Papershell pinyon and Alligator juniper are the most common tree species, along them grow Alder-leaf mountain-mahogany, Sideoats grama, Muhlenbergia emersleyi, Nolina texana, Sandpaper oak, Mexican feathergrass and Little bluestem.

Sclerophyllous temperate broad-leaved evergreen shrubland

Chihuahuan Interior Chaparral: Shrubs such as Fraxinus greggii, Mohr oak and Quercus vaseyana grow along Achnatherum eminens, Agave lechuguilla, Vauquelinia corymbosa, Desert ceanothus, Alder-leaf mountain-mahogany, Smooth-leaf sotol, Muhlenbergia emersleyi, Yucca faxoniana, Muhlenbergia setifolia and Sideoats grama.

Extremely xeromorphic evergreen shrubland

Chihuahuan Creosotebush Desert Scrub: Dominated by Creosote bush associated with Whitethorn acacia, Agave lechuguilla, Bouteloua ramosa, Candelilla, New Mexico rubber plant and Tiquilia hispidissima.

Extremely xeromorphic deciduous subdesert shrubland Fflou Chihuahuan Mixed Desert Scrub: Whitethorn acacia, Vachellia neovernicosa, American tarwort, Ocotillo, Leucophyllum minus and Catclaw mimosa along with Agave havardiana, Agave lechuguilla, Black grama, Engelmann's prickly pear, New Mexico rubber plant, Candelilla, Aristida purpurea, Smooth-leaf sotol, Aloysia gratissima, Sideoats grama, Blue grama and Bouteloua ramosa.

Chihuahuan Mesquite Desert Scrub: Dominated by Honey mesquite along with Aloysia gratissima and American tarwort associated with Aristida purpurea, Black grama, Blue grama, New Mexico rubber plant and Tobosa grass.

Extremely xeromorphic evergreen subdesert dwarf-shrubland

Chihuahuan Dwarf Desert Scrub: Dominants are Agave lechuguilla, Candelilla, Smooth-leaf sotol and New Mexico rubber plant associated with Texas false agave and Guayule.

Temperate cold-deciduous shrubland

Madrean Montane Scrub: Mainly consists of Alder-leaf mountain-mahogany and Pointleaf manzanita growing with Muhlenbergia emersleyi and Sideoats grama.

Temperate or subpolar grassland

Madrean Mesa-Foothill Grassland: This grassland is composed mainly by Black grama, Blue grama, Bouteloua ramosa, Bouteloua hirsuta, Purple three-awn, Bouteloua barbata, Black speargrass, Feather fingergrass and Tobosa grass among other species such as Sideoats grama, Mexican feathergrass, Little bluestem.

Temperate or subpolar grassland with a sparse shrub layer

Chihuahuan Foothill-Piedmont Desert Grassland: Sideoats grama, Muhlenbergia emersleyi, Muhlenbergia setifolia grow along with plants such as Viguiera dentata and rosetophyllus Yucca thompsoniana, Smooth-leaf sotol and Agave lechuguilla.

Gallery forest

Riparian communities occur at all elevations and they are usually composed by deciduous species. At higher elevations Bigtooth maple, American basswood, Narrowleaf cottonwood, Chisos hop-hornbeam, Scouler's willow, Texas ash and Arizona cypress. Coming down from the mountains several streams feed the Rio Grande, lining them grow Fremont's cottonwood, Velvet ash, Desert willow and Screwbean mesquite.

== Climate ==
The climate of the Sierra del Carmen is arid to semi-arid with more humid conditions at higher elevations. Annual precipitation is between 250 and 510 mm (10 and 20 in). Most precipitation is in the summer; snow often falls in the winter. The nearest weather station representative of the Sierra del Carmen is in Big Bend National Park which shares a similar climate.

Climate data for Big Bend National Park. Elevation: 1,609 m (5,279 ft) (1942–2010)
Month	Jan	Feb	Mar	Apr	May	Jun	Jul	Aug	Sep	Oct	Nov	Dec	Year
Record high °C (°F)	27.8 (82.0)	28.9 (84.0)	35.6 (96.1)	35.6 (96.1)	37.2 (99.0)	39.4 (102.9)	38.9 (102.0)	37.2 (99.0)	36.1 (97.0)	34.4 (93.9)	31.7 (89.1)	30.6 (87.1)	39.4 (102.9)
Mean daily maximum °C (°F)	14.7 (58.5)	16.6 (61.9)	20.3 (68.5)	24.5 (76.1)	28.2 (82.8)	30.3 (86.5)	29.3 (84.7)	28.7 (83.7)	26.3 (79.3)	23.2 (73.8)	18.4 (65.1)	15.2 (59.4)	23.0 (73.4)
Daily mean °C (°F)	8.7 (47.7)	10.3 (50.5)	13.5 (56.3)	17.7 (63.9)	21.4 (70.5)	23.8 (74.8)	23.4 (74.1)	22.8 (73.0)	20.6 (69.1)	17.1 (62.8)	12.3 (54.1)	9.3 (48.7)	16.7 (62.1)
Mean daily minimum °C (°F)	2.7 (36.9)	4.0 (39.2)	6.7 (44.1)	10.8 (51.4)	14.7 (58.5)	17.3 (63.1)	17.6 (63.7)	17.0 (62.6)	14.7 (58.5)	11.0 (51.8)	6.2 (43.2)	3.3 (37.9)	10.5 (50.9)
Record low °C (°F)	−19.4 (−2.9)	−14.4 (6.1)	−11.1 (12.0)	−3.9 (25.0)	2.8 (37.0)	7.2 (45.0)	11.7 (53.1)	11.1 (52.0)	1.1 (34.0)	−7.2 (19.0)	−10.6 (12.9)	−15.6 (3.9)	−19.4 (−2.9)
Average precipitation mm (inches)	17.0 (0.67)	15.0 (0.59)	10.0 (0.39)	16.0 (0.63)	40.0 (1.57)	57.0 (2.24)	87.0 (3.43)	80.0 (3.15)	64.0 (2.52)	39.0 (1.54)	14.0 (0.55)	13.0 (0.51)	452.0 (17.80)
Average precipitation days (≥ 0.1 mm)	3	3	2	3	6	7	10	9	7	5	3	3	61
Source: Weatherbase: Higueras, Nuevo Leon

The climatic classification of this station is Bsk (Koppen) or Bsal (Trewartha).

== Conservation efforts ==
The isolation of the Sierra del Carmen and its relatively undisturbed environment has led to conservation efforts in Mexico and jointly with the United States. Much of the Sierra del Carmen has been declared by the government of Mexico the Maderas del Carmen Flora and Fauna Protected Area, a designation which allows many economic activities and private land holdings to continue to exist within the boundaries. The protected area comprises 2,100 km^{2} (520,000 acres). The Maderas del Carmen is part of a bi-lateral conservation project called the El Carmen—Big Bend Conservation Corridor Initiative which includes contiguous land designated for conservation on both sides of the border totaling more than 12,000 km^{2} (4,600 sq mi), an area almost as large as the U.S. state of Connecticut. In 2005, Maderas del Carmen became the first designated Wilderness area in Latin America.

The Maderas del Carmen Protected Area was created in 1994, although conservation efforts were initially slowed because the land was privately owned, either in large ranches or in the collective farms called ejidos in Mexico. In 2000 a Mexican corporation, Cementos de Mexico (CEMEX) began to purchase lands for conservation in the region. On CEMEX land livestock and fences were removed and native vegetation encouraged. By 2006, CEMEX owned 790 square kilometres (195,000 acres) in or near the Maderas del Carmen and managed another 25,300 hectares (62,500 acres).

One of the important characteristics of the Sierra del Carmen is that it functions as a "corridor" enabling wildlife to migrate north and south. In the late 1980s the corridor between the Sierra and the mountains of west Texas enabled the black bear to disperse northward and reestablish itself in Big Bend National Park. The black bear had been extirpated from west Texas in the 1950s.

In other initiatives, in 2000, CEMEX in cooperation with conservation organizations in Mexico and Texas began breeding and releasing to the wild bighorn sheep which had been absent from the Sierra del Carmen for more than 50 years.

On 24 October 2011, Mexico and the United States signed an agreement for "Cooperative Action for Conservation in the Big Bend-Rio Bravo Natural Area of Binational Interest."

In 2019, 19 American Bison were reintroduced in the protected area with future plans of releasing more.
