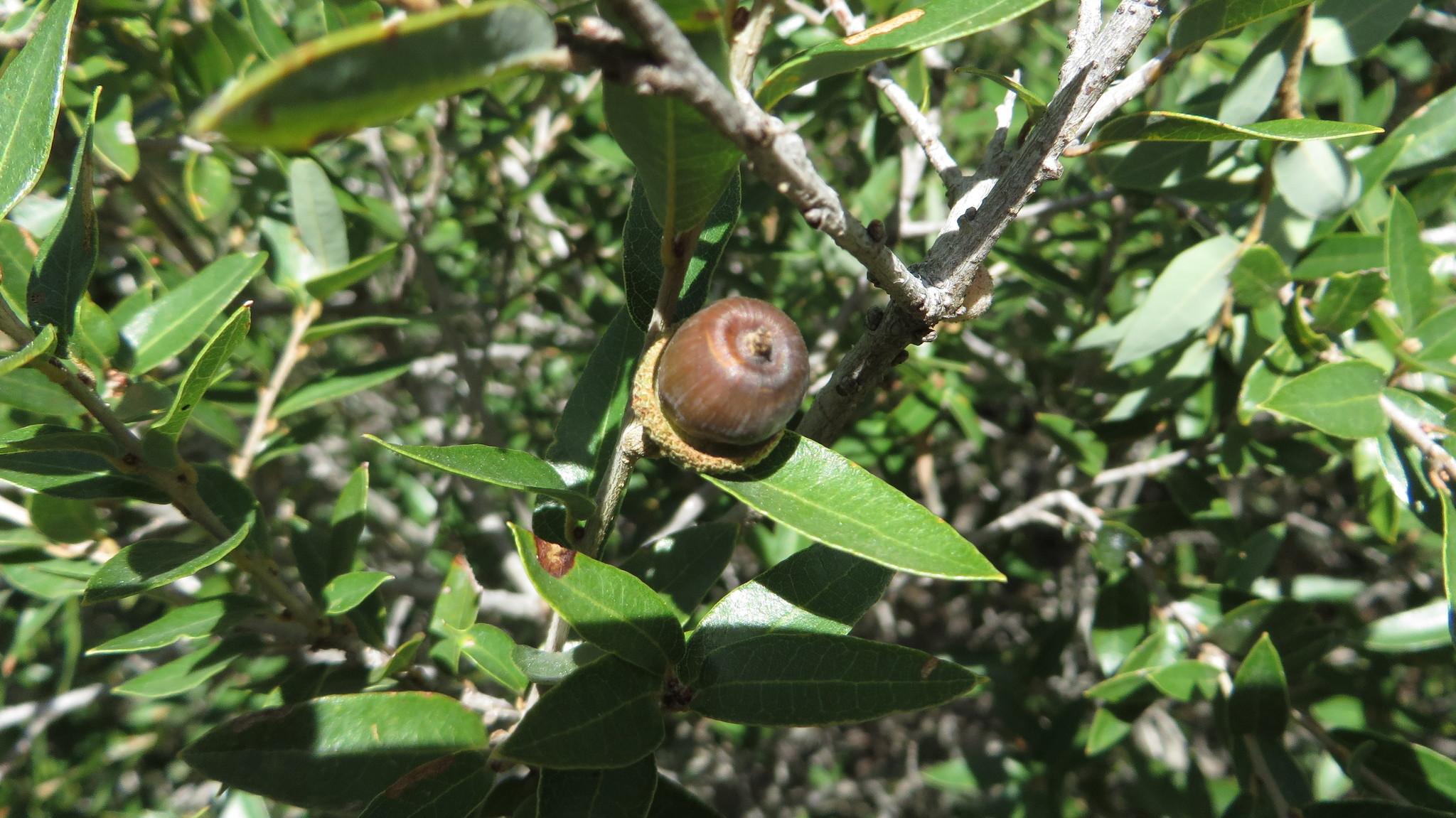

Conservation status
- Least Concern (IUCN 3.1)

Scientific classification
- Kingdom: Plantae
- Clade: Embryophytes
- Clade: Tracheophytes
- Clade: Spermatophytes
- Clade: Angiosperms
- Clade: Eudicots
- Clade: Rosids
- Order: Fagales
- Family: Fagaceae
- Genus: Quercus
- Subgenus: Quercus subg. Quercus
- Section: Quercus sect. Quercus
- Species: Q. pringlei

Binomial name
- Quercus pringlei Seemen ex Loes.

Synonyms
- Quercus filiformis C.H.Mull.; Quercus pringlei f. dentata C.H.Mull.

= Quercus pringlei =

Species of oak

Quercus pringlei is a species of oak native to northeastern Mexico.

== Description ==
Quercus pringlei is a shrub or small tree, which generally grows from .5 or 1 to 4 meters tall, and occasionally up to 10 meters tall.

== Range and habitat ==
Quercus pringlei is native to the Sierra Madre Oriental and the isolated mountain ranges of the southern Mexican Plateau, from 1,500 to 2,400 meters elevation, in the states of Coahuila, Durango, Hidalgo, Nuevo León, Querétaro, San Luis Potosí, Tamaulipas, and Zacatecas.

It is found in submontane scrub, which can range from sparse to dense, and into montane oak and pine–oak forest at higher elevations. It is commonly found with the oaks Quercus intricata, Quercus invaginata, and Quercus pungens, and with Pinus cembroides, Juniperus saltillensis, Juniperus pinchotii, Quercus intricata, and Quercus striatula.

When its native forests are degraded by deforestation, fire, and/or overgrazing, it is often replaced by sparse or dense chaparral, with Q. striatula, Agave gentryi, Piptochaetium fimbriatum, and other plants characteristic of lower-elevation xerophilous scrub communities.

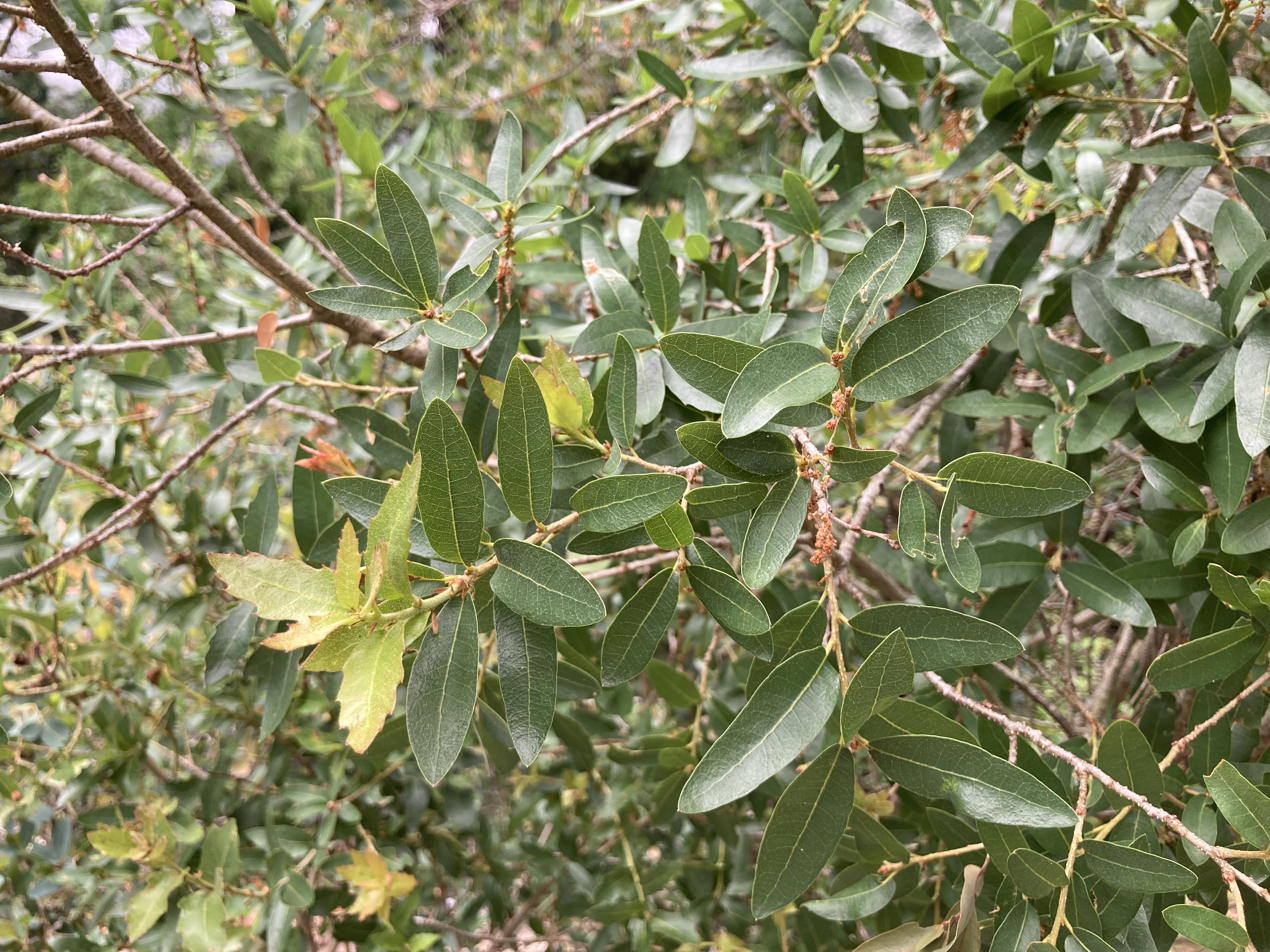
Detail of the leaves
