= Vasey oak =

Vasey oak may refer to:

- Quercus vaseyana
- Quercus pungens
