= Quercus tardifolia =

Conservation status
- Data Deficient (IUCN 3.1)

Scientific classification
- Kingdom: Plantae
- Clade: Embryophytes
- Clade: Tracheophytes
- Clade: Spermatophytes
- Clade: Angiosperms
- Clade: Eudicots
- Clade: Rosids
- Order: Fagales
- Family: Fagaceae
- Genus: Quercus
- Subgenus: Quercus subg. Quercus
- Section: Quercus sect. Lobatae
- Species: Q. tardifolia

Binomial name
- Quercus tardifolia C.H.Mull.

Species of tree

Quercus tardifolia, the Chisos Mountains oak or lateleaf oak, is a rare North American species of oak. It has been found in the Chisos Mountains inside Big Bend National Park in Texas, and in the nearby Sierra del Carmen across the Río Grande in northern Coahuila.

Quercus tardifolia is an evergreen tree with gray bark and reddish-brown twigs. The leaves are flat, up to 10 centimetres (4 inches) long, green on the upper surface and with woolly hairs on the underside, with a few shallow lobes.

== Conservation ==
This species was thought to be extinct, however on May 25, 2022, a remaining specimen was found.

== Etymology ==
The common name Chisos Mountains oak refers to the Chisos Mountains range where the species was discovered, and the species name refers to the tree leafing out later than comparable species.
