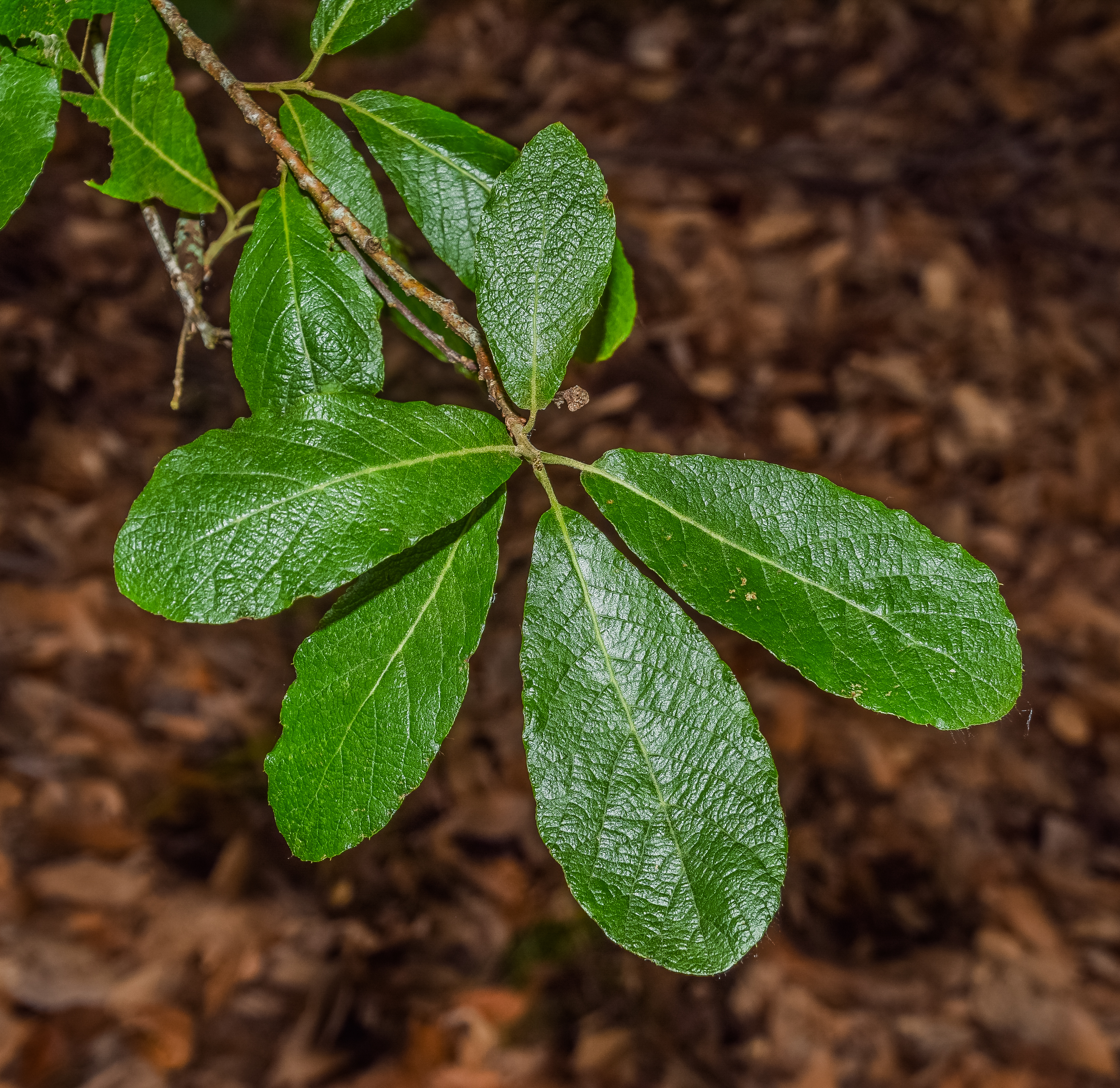
- Quercus sideroxyla in Hackfalls Arboretum

Conservation status
- Least Concern (IUCN 3.1)

Scientific classification
- Kingdom: Plantae
- Clade: Tracheophytes
- Clade: Angiosperms
- Clade: Eudicots
- Clade: Rosids
- Order: Fagales
- Family: Fagaceae
- Genus: Quercus
- Subgenus: Quercus subg. Quercus
- Section: Quercus sect. Lobatae
- Species: Q. sideroxyla

Binomial name
- Quercus sideroxyla Bonpl.

Synonyms
- List: Quercus epileuca Trel.; Quercus incarnata Trel.; Quercus incarnata f. ampla Trel.; Quercus incarnata f. grosseserrata Trel.; Quercus incarnata f. longa Trel.; Quercus omissa A.DC.; Quercus sideroxyla f. aquifolia Trel.; Quercus sideroxyla f. ciliifera Trel.

= Quercus sideroxyla =

Species of flowering plant

Quercus sideroxyla, called the Santa Rosa oak and encino colorado, is a species of oak native to northern and southwestern Mexico. Used for charcoal production, it prefers to grow at elevations from 1,800 to 2,700 metres (5,900 to 8,900 feet). It is placed in section Lobatae.
