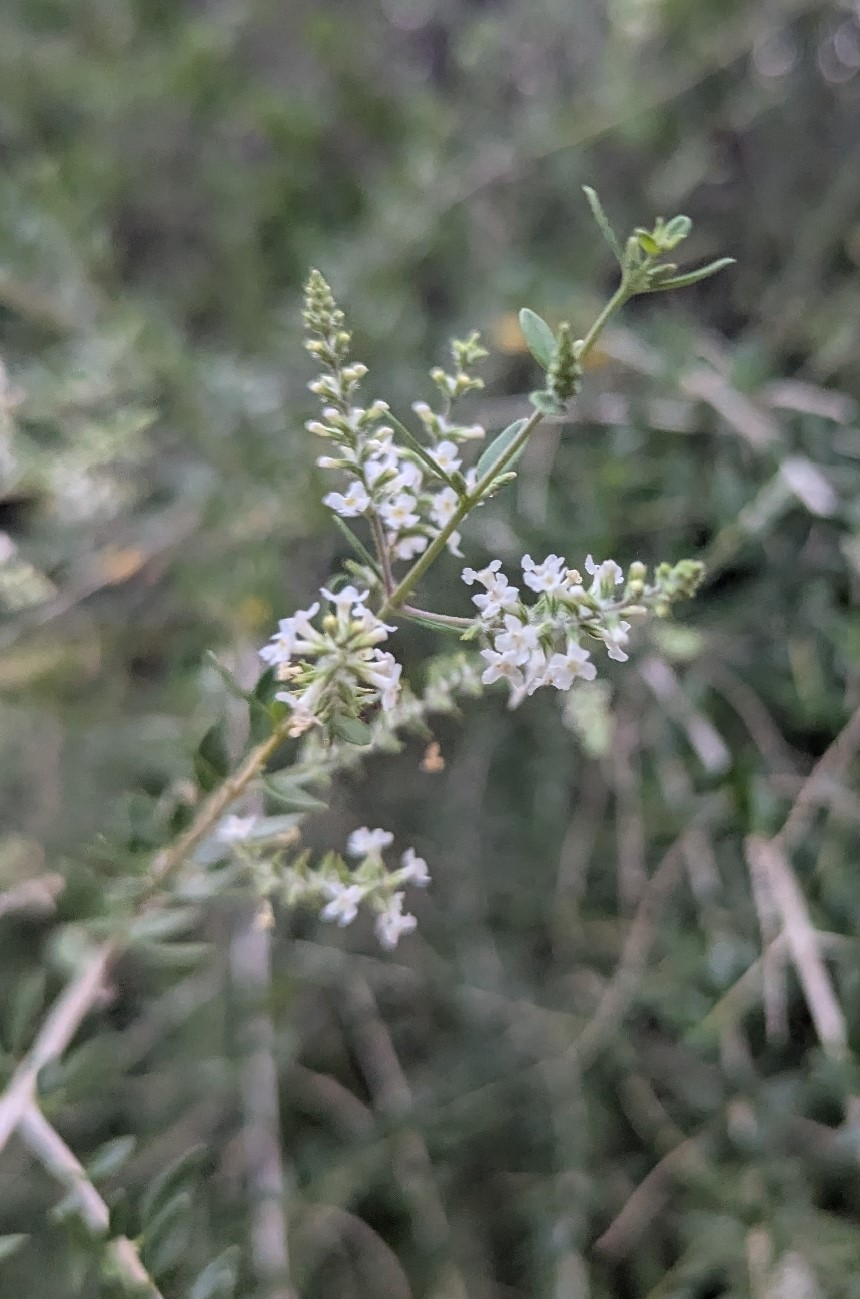

Conservation status
- Secure (NatureServe)

Scientific classification
- Kingdom: Plantae
- Clade: Tracheophytes
- Clade: Angiosperms
- Clade: Eudicots
- Clade: Asterids
- Order: Lamiales
- Family: Verbenaceae
- Genus: Aloysia
- Species: A. gratissima

Binomial name
- Aloysia gratissima (Gillies & Hook.) Tronc.

= Aloysia gratissima =

Species of flowering plant

Aloysia gratissima, commonly called whitebrush or beebrush, is a species of flowering plant in the verbena family Verbenaceae. It is native to Texas through Arizona in the United States, northern Mexico through Veracruz and Oaxaca in North America and southern Brazil, Bolivia, Paraguay, Uruguay, northern Argentina, and central Chile in South America.

== Description ==
Aloysia gratissima is a perennial, deciduous erect shrub which can grow up to 10 feet in ideal conditions. It produces small, tubular, white fragrant blooms which cluster on the terminal ends of its branches and blooms between March-November depending on its habitat, A. gratissima produces a drupe fruit and slender, round to pointed, fragrant green leaves.

== Conservation status ==
It is currently listed as not threatened.

== Uses ==
Aloysia gratissima is a common plant to include in cultivation due to its heat and drought tolerance and fragrant blooms which attract pollinating insects and fruit-birds.

It has been used in traditional medicine in the Americas to treat conditions including lung disorders, inflammation, and nervous disorders such as depression and anxiety.
