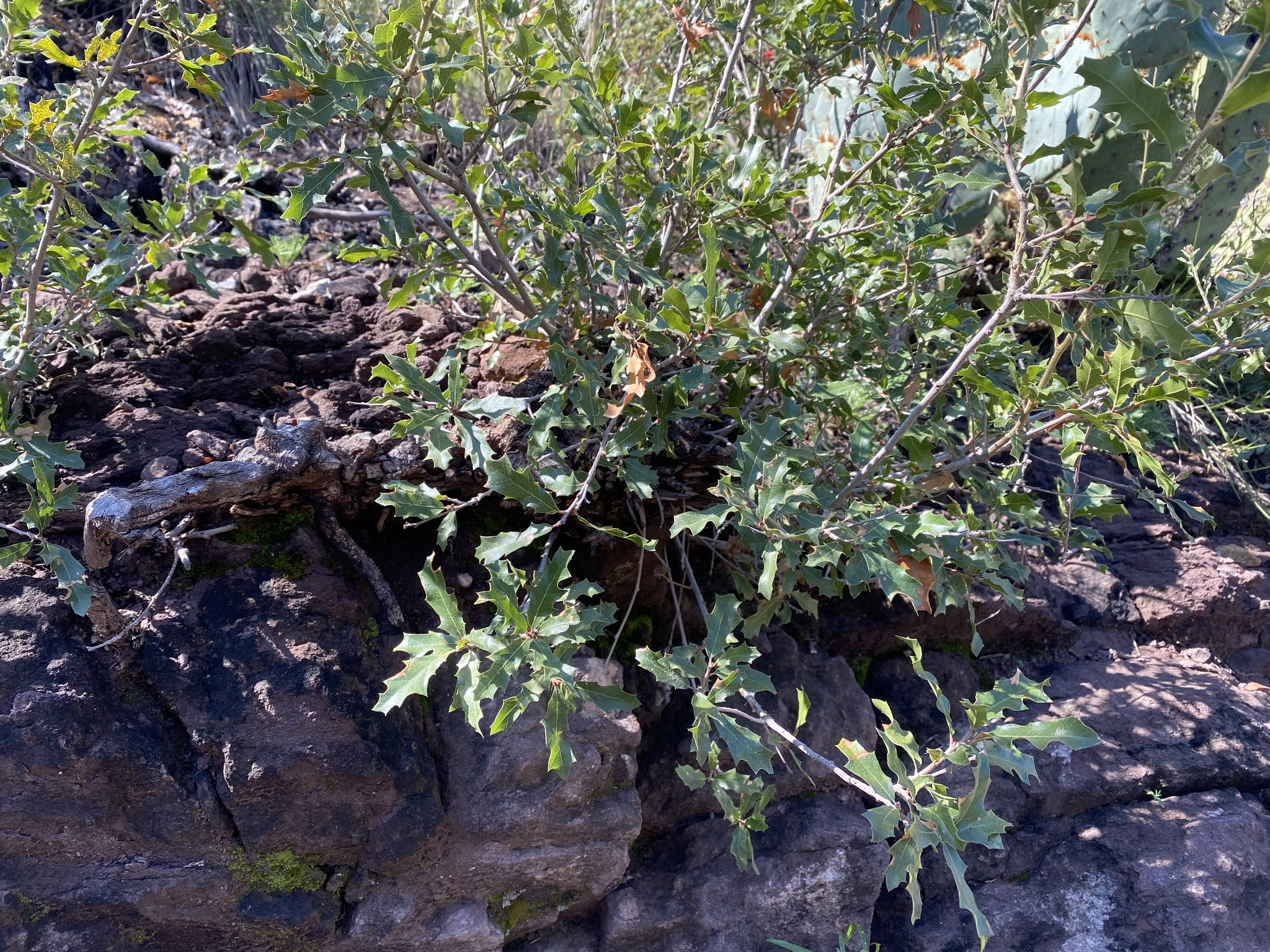

Conservation status
- Least Concern (IUCN 3.1)

Scientific classification
- Kingdom: Plantae
- Clade: Embryophytes
- Clade: Tracheophytes
- Clade: Spermatophytes
- Clade: Angiosperms
- Clade: Eudicots
- Clade: Rosids
- Order: Fagales
- Family: Fagaceae
- Genus: Quercus
- Subgenus: Quercus subg. Quercus
- Section: Quercus sect. Lobatae
- Species: Q. gravesii

Binomial name
- Quercus gravesii Sudworth
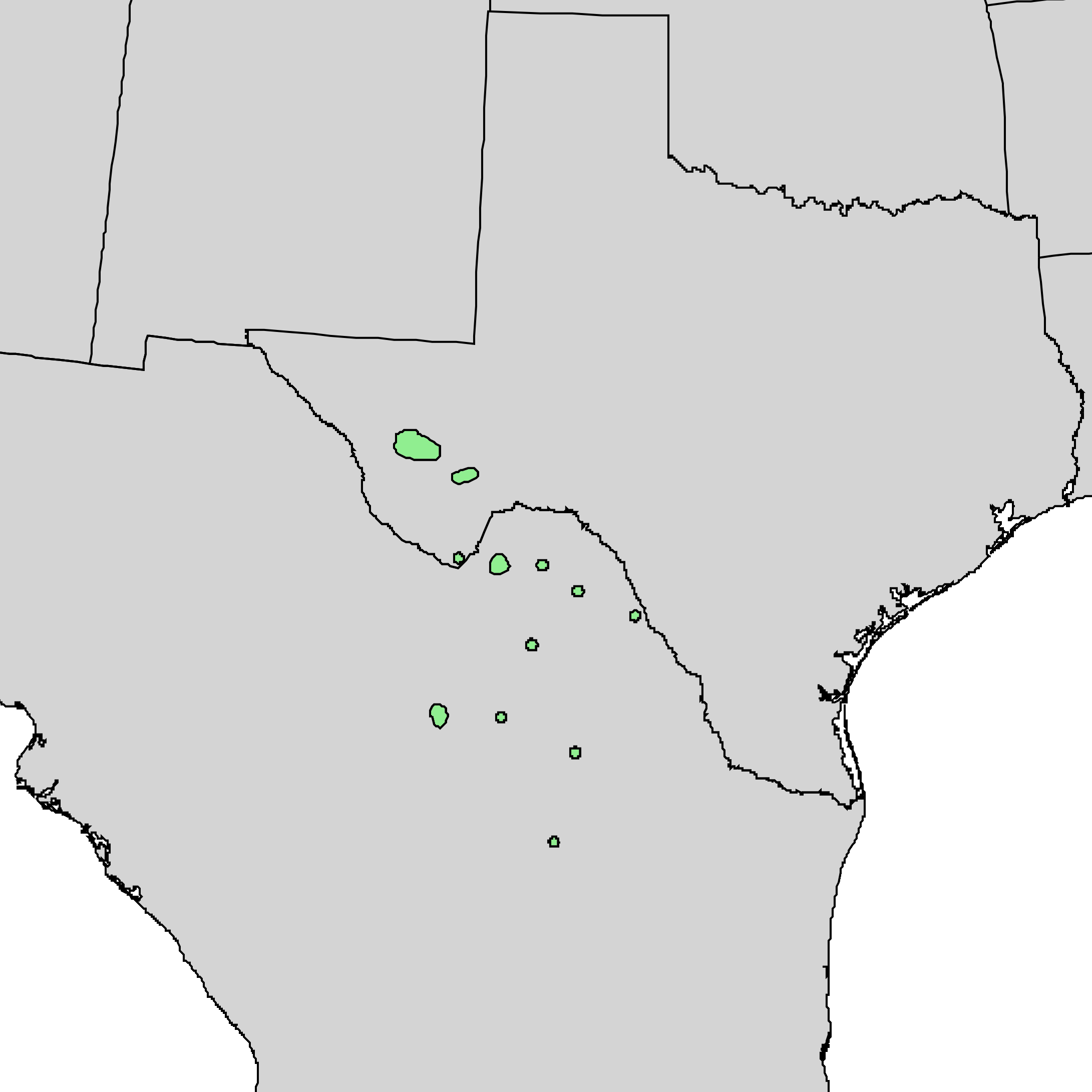
- Natural range of Quercus gravesii

Synonyms
- Quercus chesosensis (Sarg.) C.H.Mull.; Quercus coccinea var. microcarpa Torr.; Quercus shumardii var. microcarpa (Torr.) Shinners; Quercus stellapila (Sarg.) Parks; Quercus texana var. chesosensis Sarg.; Quercus texana var. stellapila Sarg.

= Quercus gravesii =

Species of oak tree

Quercus gravesii (also called Chisos red oak or Grave's oak) is an uncommon North American species of oak in the red oak section Quercus section Lobatae. It is found in Mexico and the United States.

It is a deciduous tree up to 13 metres (43 feet) tall. The leaves are hairless, each with 3–5 pointed and awned lobes. The bark is black.

It is closely related to shumard oak and emory oak.

== Distribution ==
Grave's oak can be found in three areas of southwest Texas, including Big Bend National Park, and mountain ranges of neighboring Coahuila state.

== Gallery ==
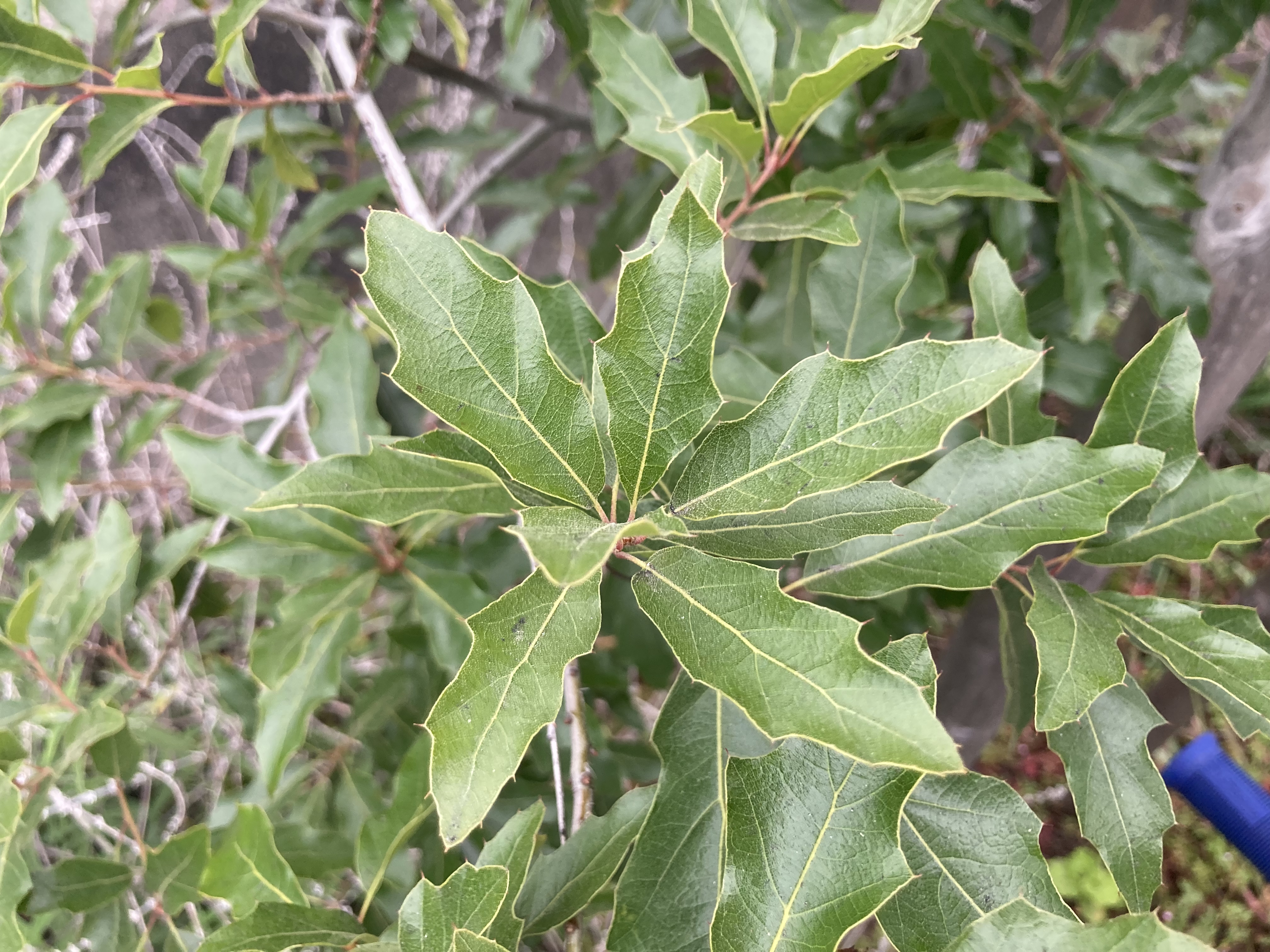
Leaf detail

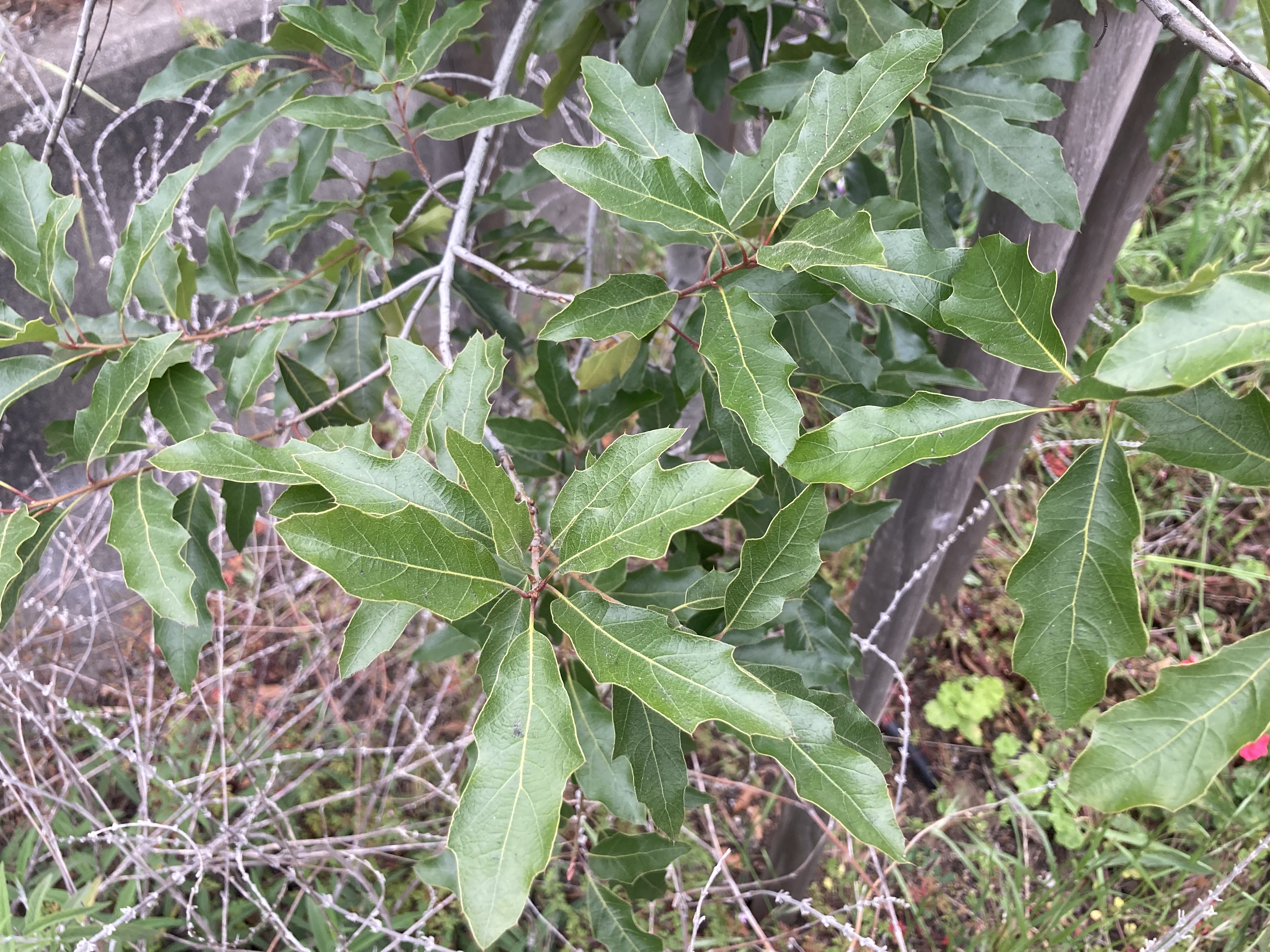
A tree in Berkeley, CA

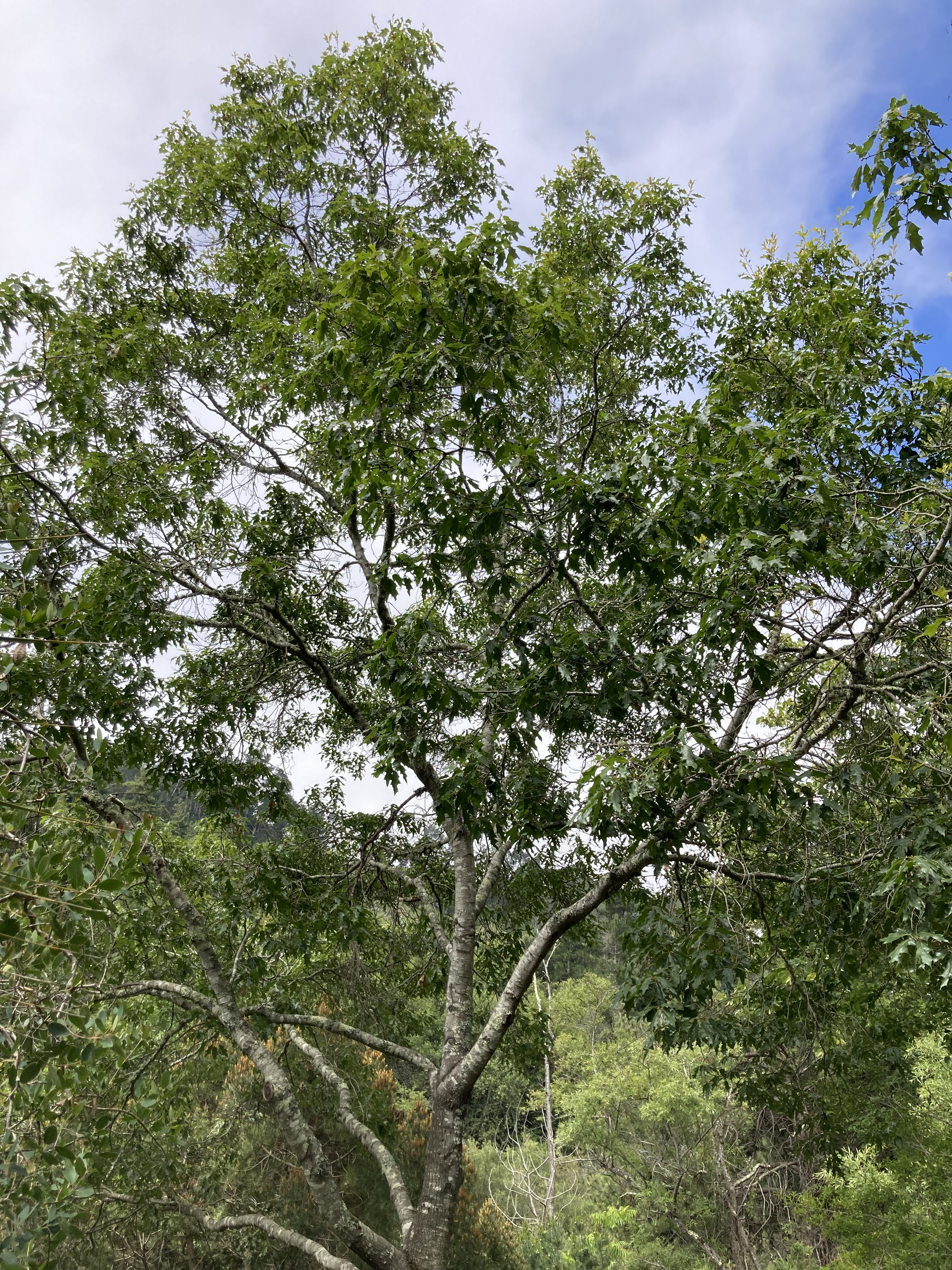
Mature specimen at UC Berkeley Botanical Garden
