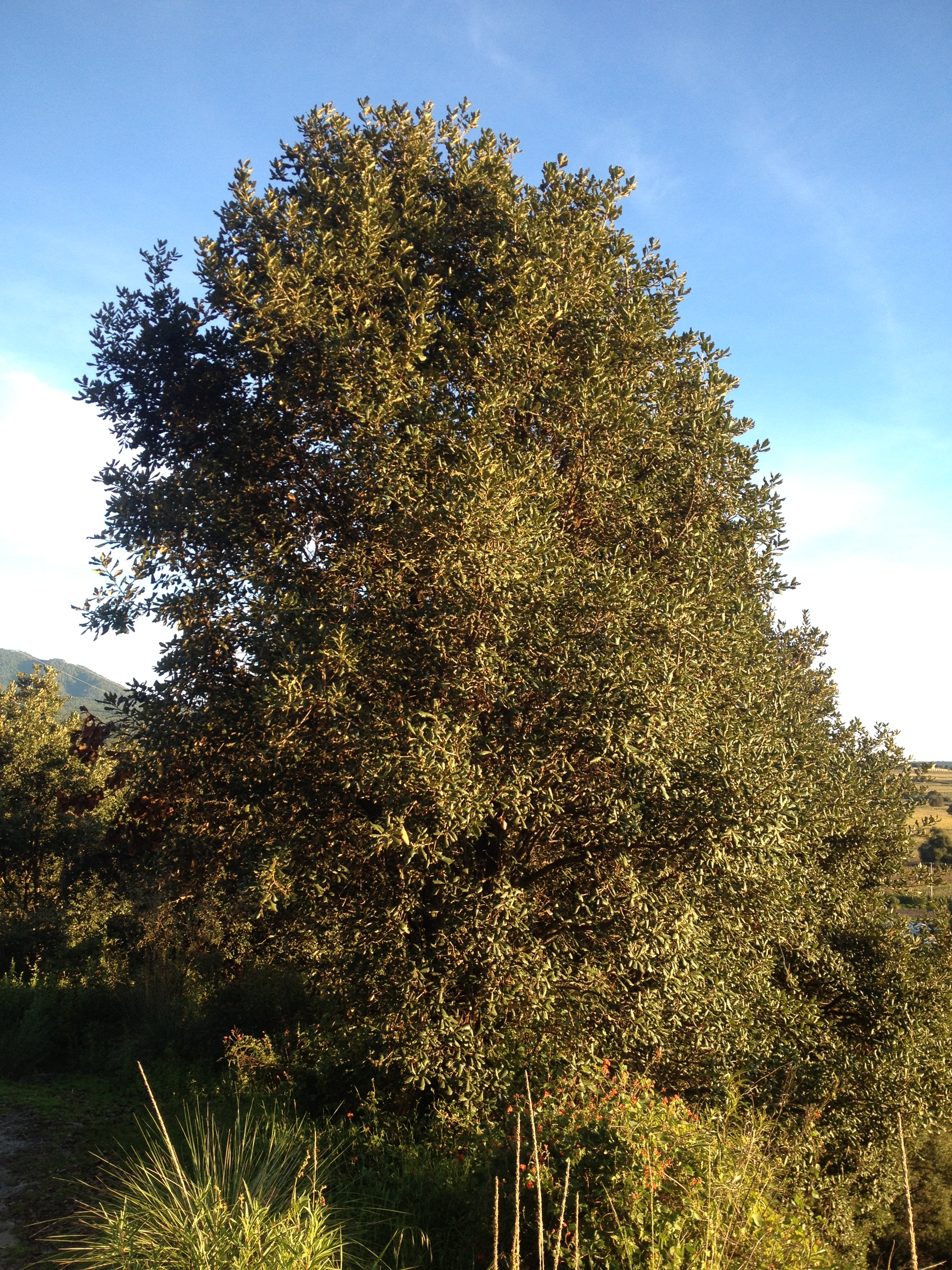

Conservation status
- Least Concern (IUCN 3.1)

- Apparently Secure (NatureServe)

Scientific classification
- Kingdom: Plantae
- Clade: Tracheophytes
- Clade: Angiosperms
- Clade: Eudicots
- Clade: Rosids
- Order: Fagales
- Family: Fagaceae
- Genus: Quercus
- Subgenus: Quercus subg. Quercus
- Section: Quercus sect. Quercus
- Species: Q. rugosa

Binomial name
- Quercus rugosa Née
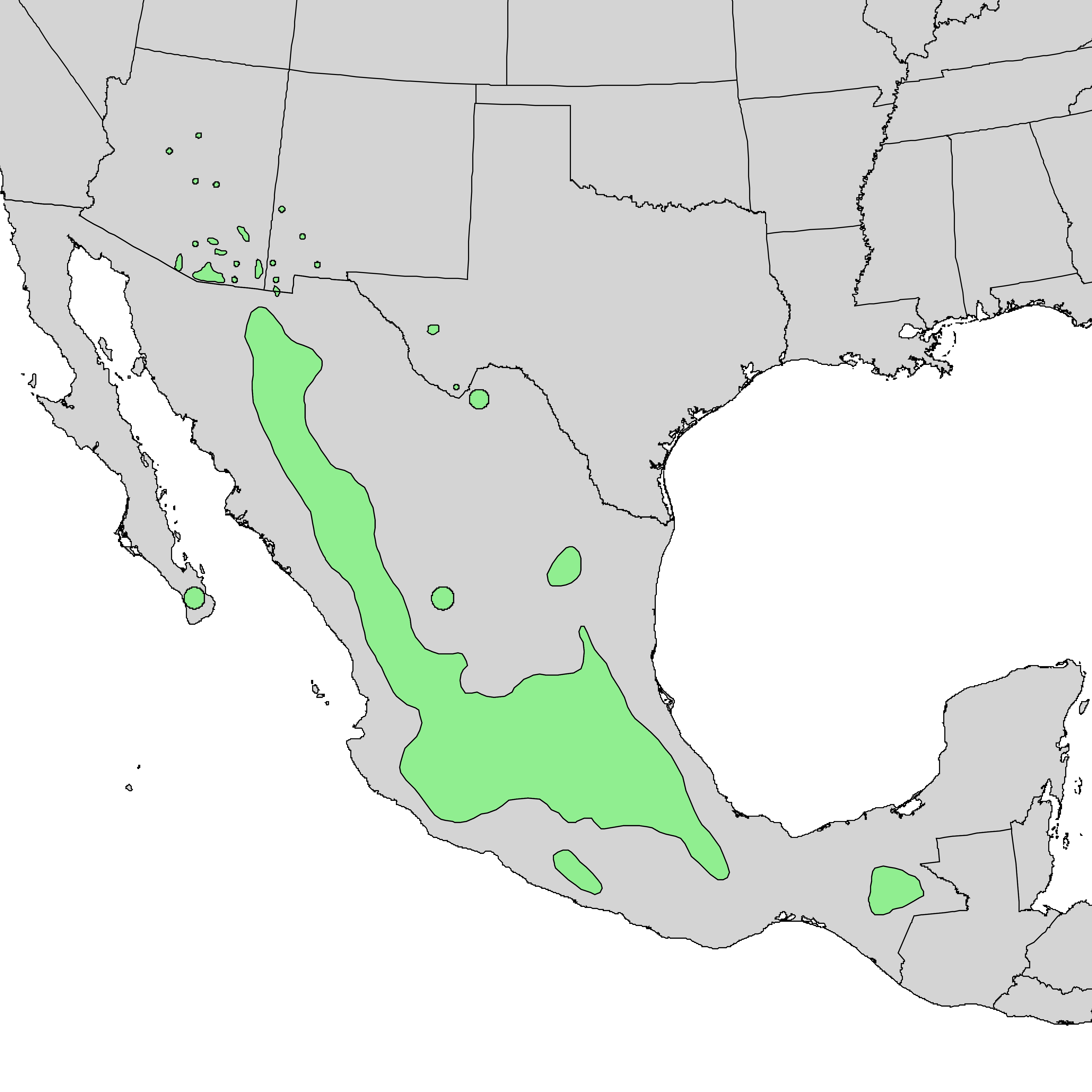
- Natural range of Quercus rugosa

Synonyms
- List: Quercus conglomerata Trel.; Quercus decipiens M.Martens & Galeotti; Quercus diversicolor Trel.; Quercus dugesii (Trel.) A.Nelson; Quercus durangensis Trel.; Quercus innuncupata Trel.; Quercus macrophylla var. rugosa (Née) Wenz.; Quercus mellifera Ocampo; Quercus purpusii Trel.; Quercus reticulata Bonpl.; Quercus rhodophlebia Trel.; Quercus suchiensis E.F.Warb.; Quercus uhdeana Trel.; Quercus vellifera Trel.

= Quercus rugosa =

Species of oak tree

Quercus rugosa, commonly known as the netleaf oak, is a broad-leaved tree in the beech and oak family Fagaceae. It is native to southern North America.

== Description ==
Quercus rugosa is an evergreen shrub or tree. The bark is brown and scaly. The leaves are thick and leathery, rarely flat, usually cupped, up to 15 centimetres (6 in) long, dark green on the top but covered with thick reddish-brown hairs on the underside. The young leaves are also very hairy and usually red or yellow.

== Name ==
Quercus rugosa is Latin for "wrinkled oak". In Spanish it has many common names, like "encino negro" (black oak) or "encino quiebra hacha" (axe-breaking oak). Colloquially it is known as "chaparro", a word which has also passed into the lexicon as slang for a short person.

== Distribution ==
It is widespread in Mexico, Guatemala and the southwestern United States (Arizona, New Mexico, western Texas). It grows extensively in the temperate highlands of central Mexico, particularly on hillsides and in narrow gorges, between 1,800 and 2,900 metres (5,910 and 9,510 ft) elevation. It is associated and usually coexists with other oaks, alders, pines and Texas madrones. The Netleaf Oak has been widely planted in California cities as a drought-tolerant street tree, following street tree die-offs during dry spells.

== Gallery ==
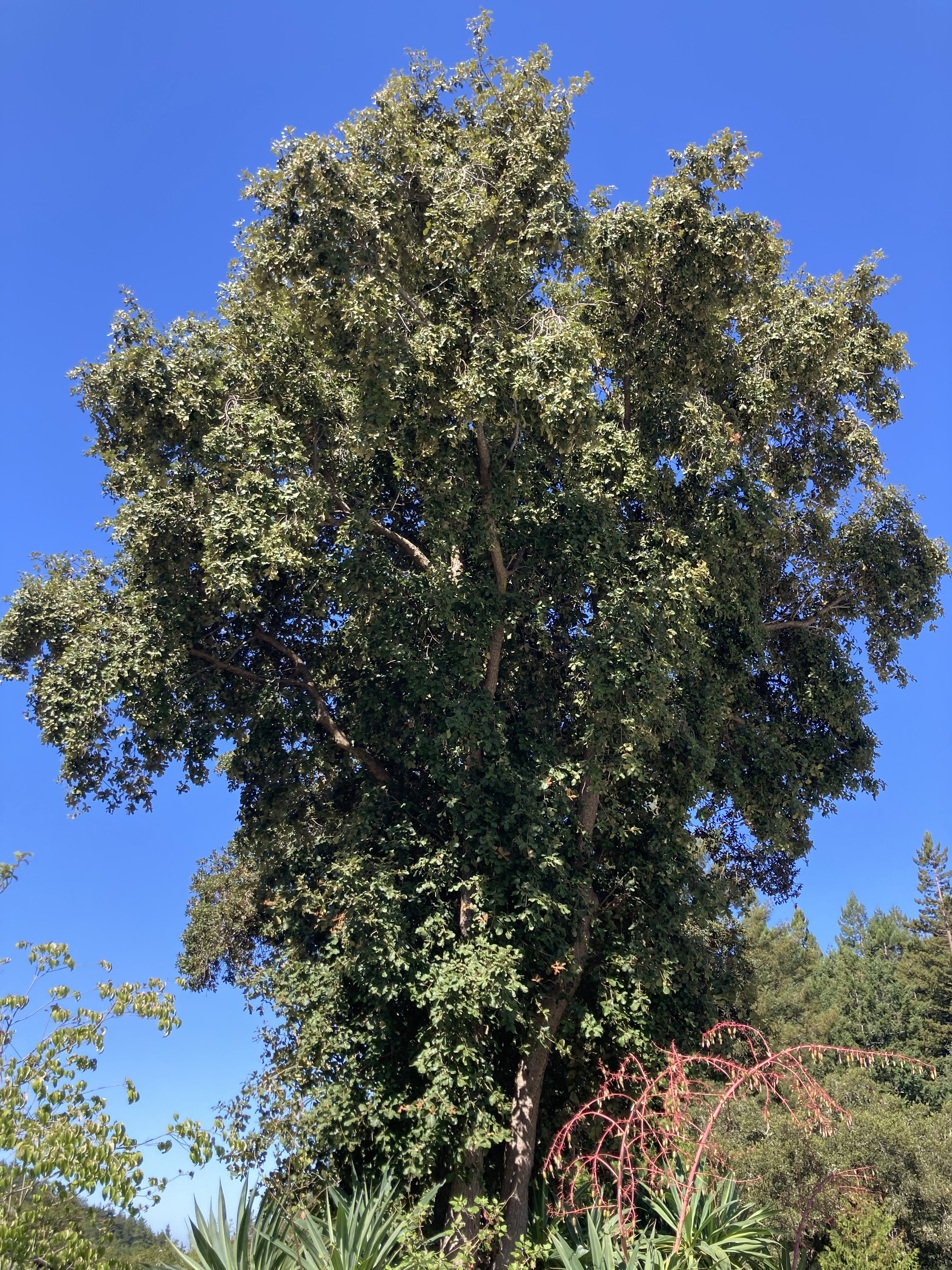
Mature specimen

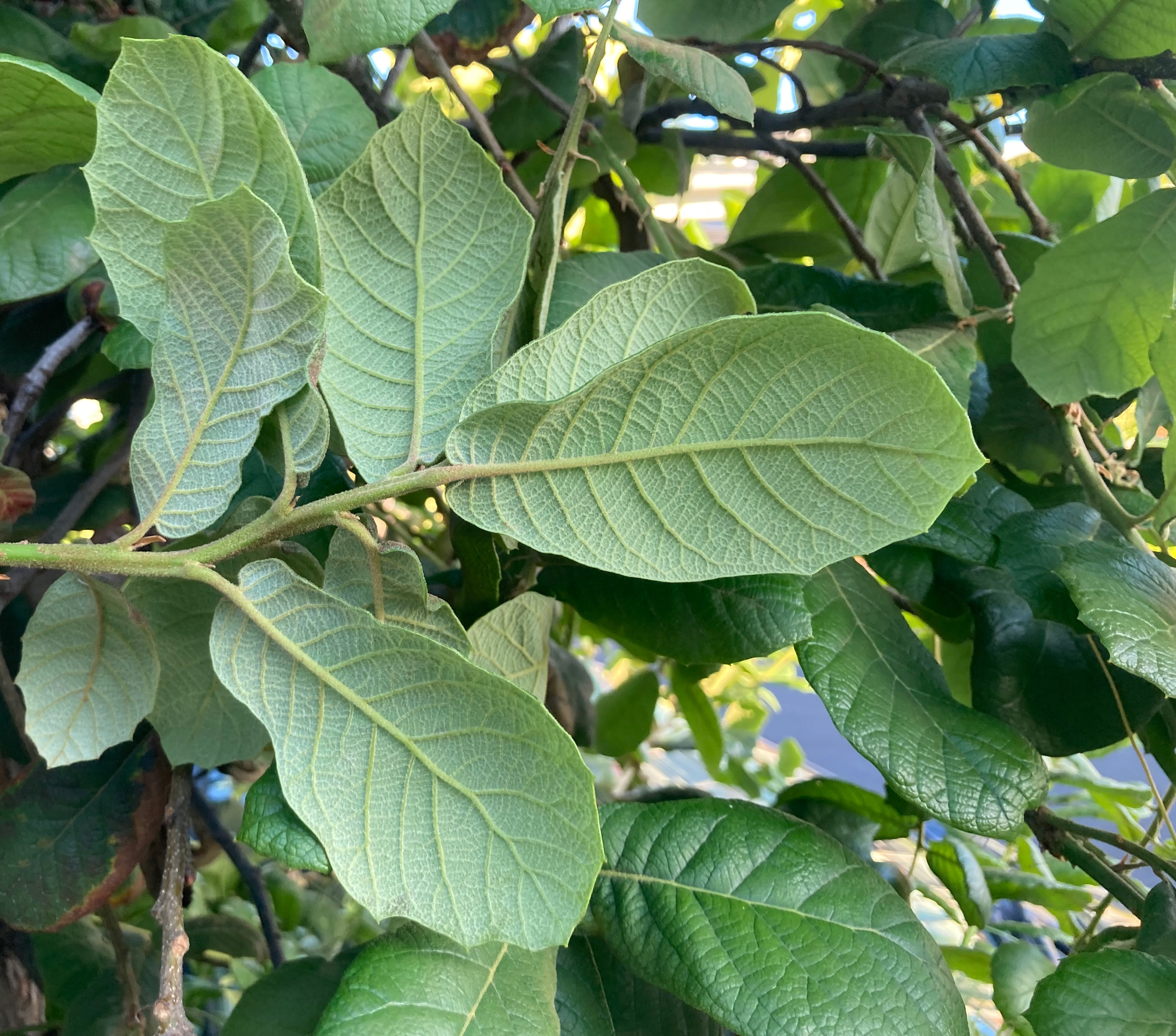
Underside of the leaves.

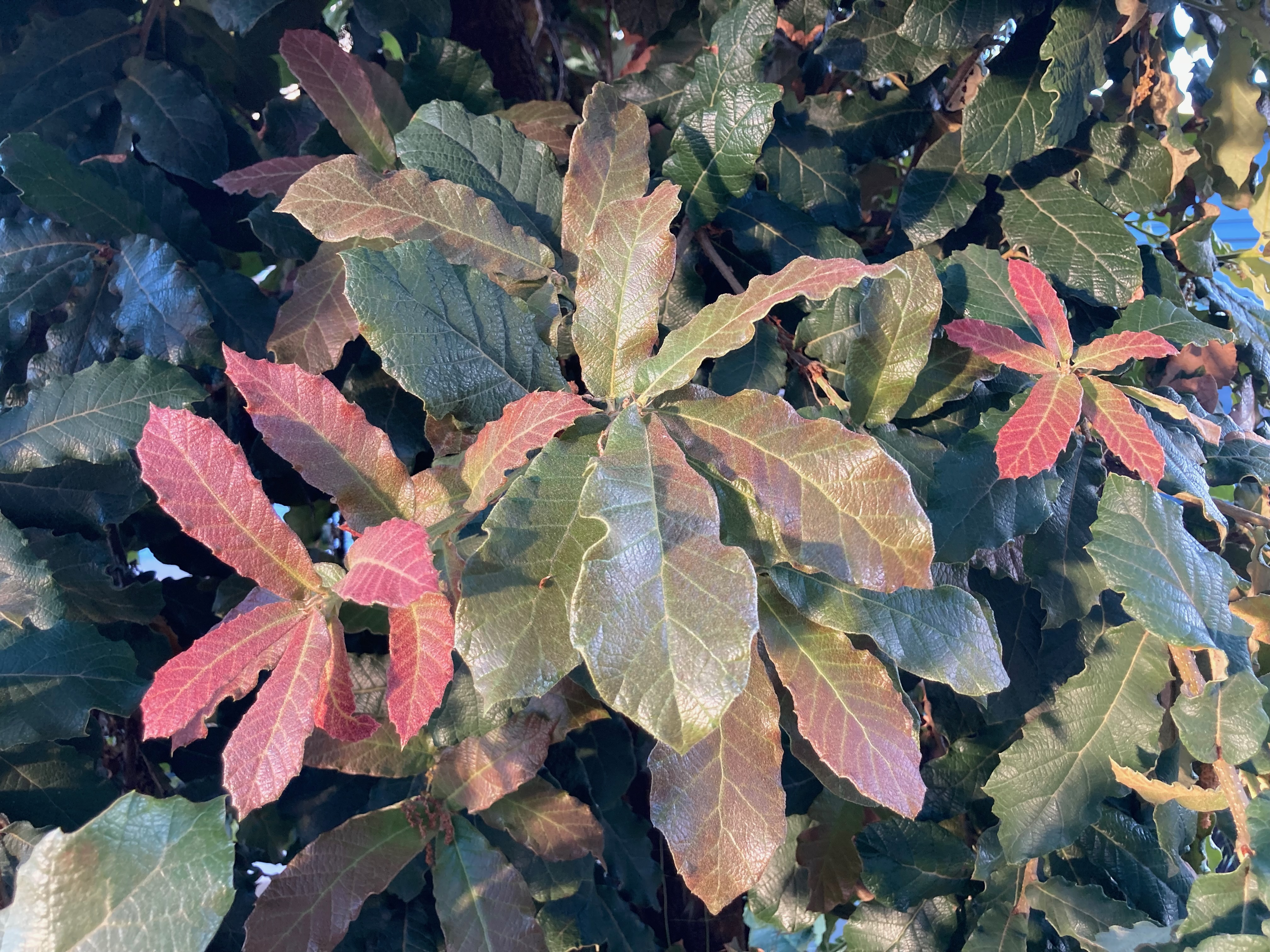
Immature leaves are quite red.

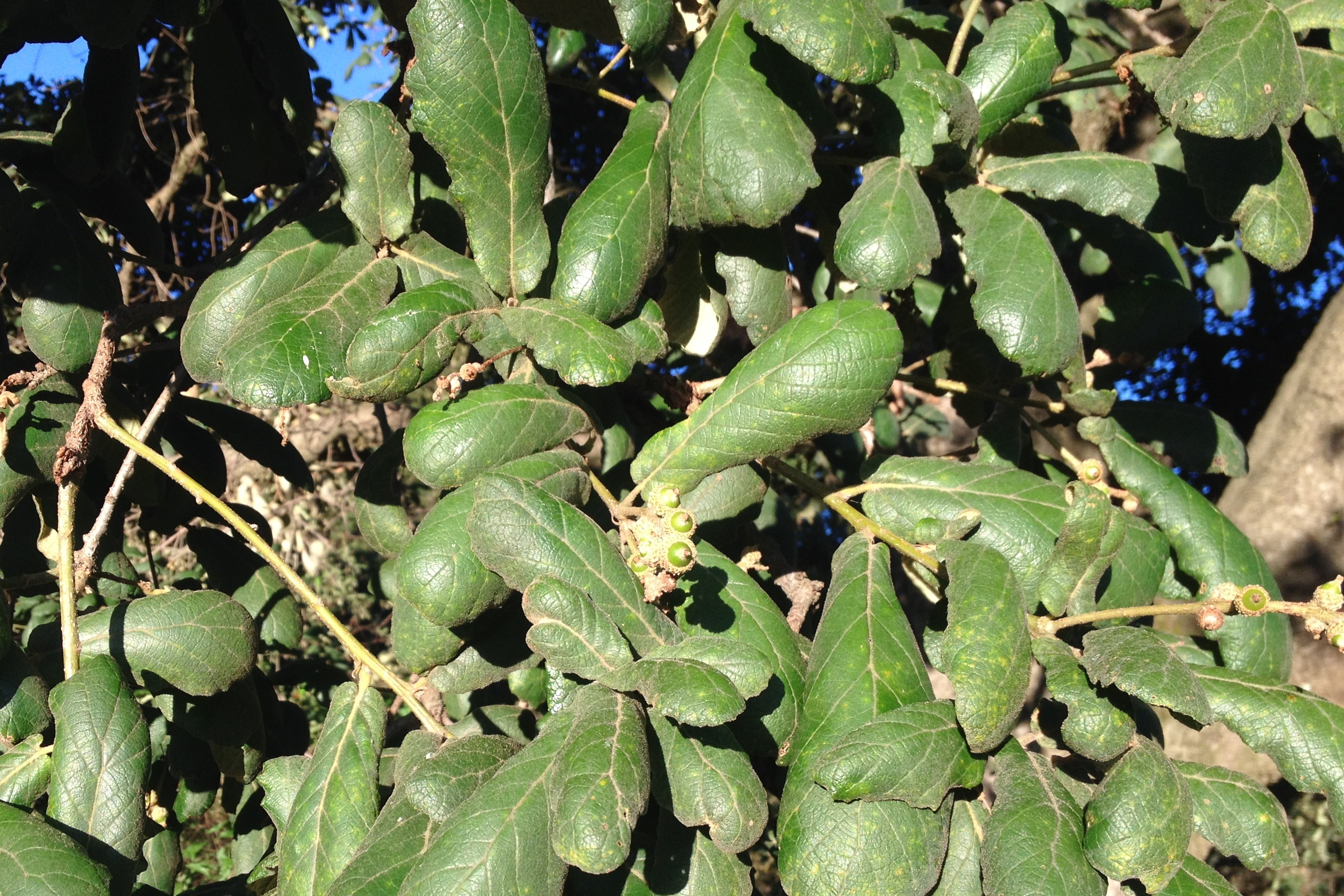
Leaves and acorns.

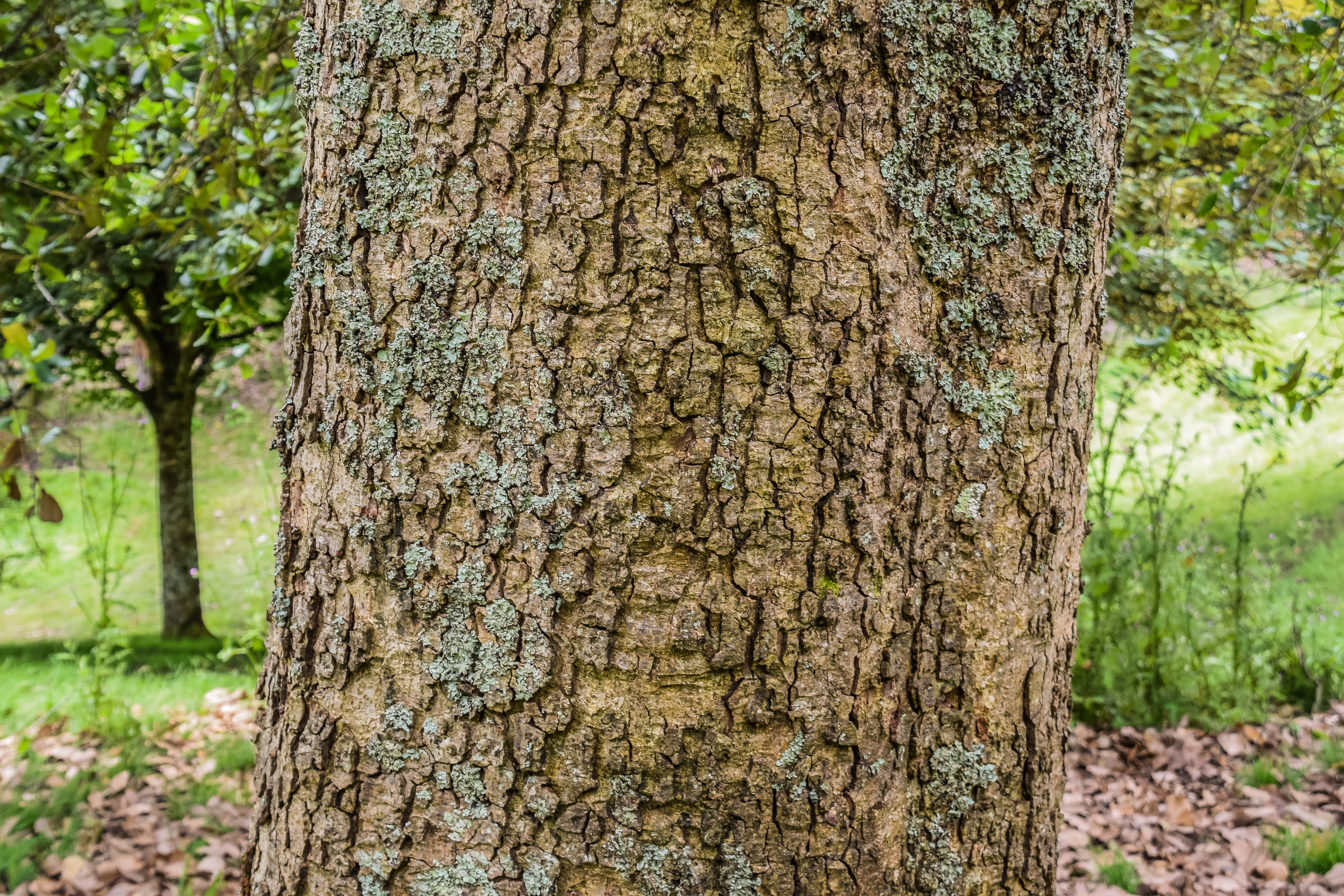
Detail of Bark.

== See also ==
- Madrean pine-oak woodlands
- Trans-Mexican Volcanic Belt pine-oak forests
