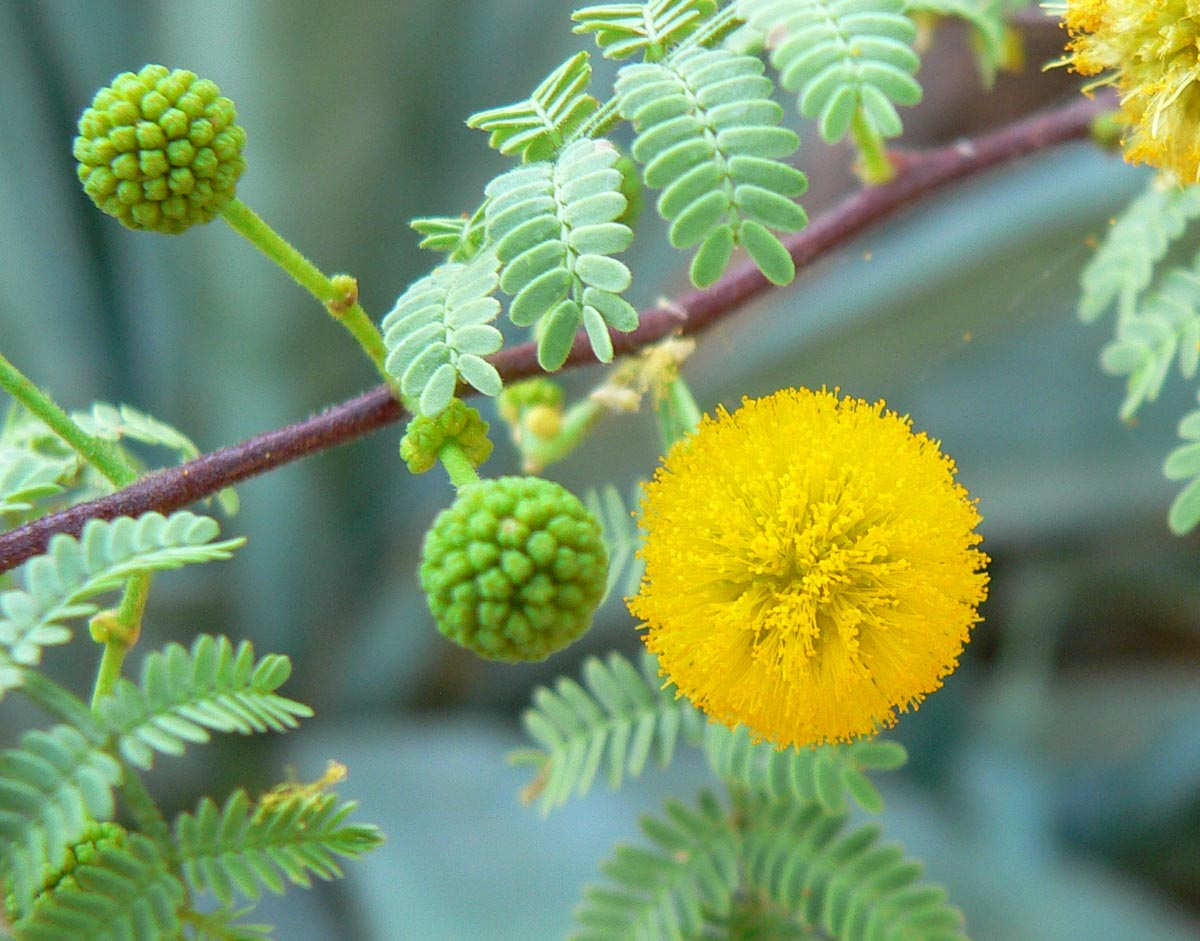

Scientific classification
- Kingdom: Plantae
- Clade: Tracheophytes
- Clade: Angiosperms
- Clade: Eudicots
- Clade: Rosids
- Order: Fabales
- Family: Fabaceae
- Subfamily: Caesalpinioideae
- Clade: Mimosoid clade
- Genus: Vachellia
- Species: V. constricta

Binomial name
- Vachellia constricta (Benth.) Seigler & Ebinger

Synonyms
- Acacia constricta Benth.

= Vachellia constricta =

Species of legume

Vachellia constricta, also known commonly as the whitethorn acacia, is a shrub native to Mexico and the Southwestern United States.

== Distribution ==
In the Southwest V. constricta grows in the southern half of Arizona, extending into New Mexico and West Texas. It grows in Mexico as far south as Oaxaca, with small disjunct populations in Baja California and in the Magdalena Plain of Baja California Sur.

In the Sonoran Desert, Vachellia constricta grows in arroyos and washes, where it blooms in late spring (April–May), with a second round of blooms in July–October. Blooming requires a minimum amount of rain, followed by a period of warmth.

== Description ==
Vachellia constricta typically grows to 2 metres (6.6 ft) in height, occasionally reaching 6 metres (20 ft). Its stems range from a light gray to a mahogany color, with pairs of straight white spines anywhere from 0.5 to 2 cm long.

The small leaves are even-pinnate, usually 2.5–4 cm in length, with each of the 3–9 pairs of pinnae made of 4–16 pairs of leaflets, which are about 3.5 mm long and 1 mm wide. The flowers occur in small yellow balls about 1 cm in diameter. The flowers offer no nectar and little pollen, and so tend to have few visitors. Extrafloral nectaries grow along the main stem of the compound leaves and attract ants to the trees. The seed pods are relatively long and thin, up to 12 cm long but only 3–6 mm wide.

The leaves may drop in response to either dryness or cold.

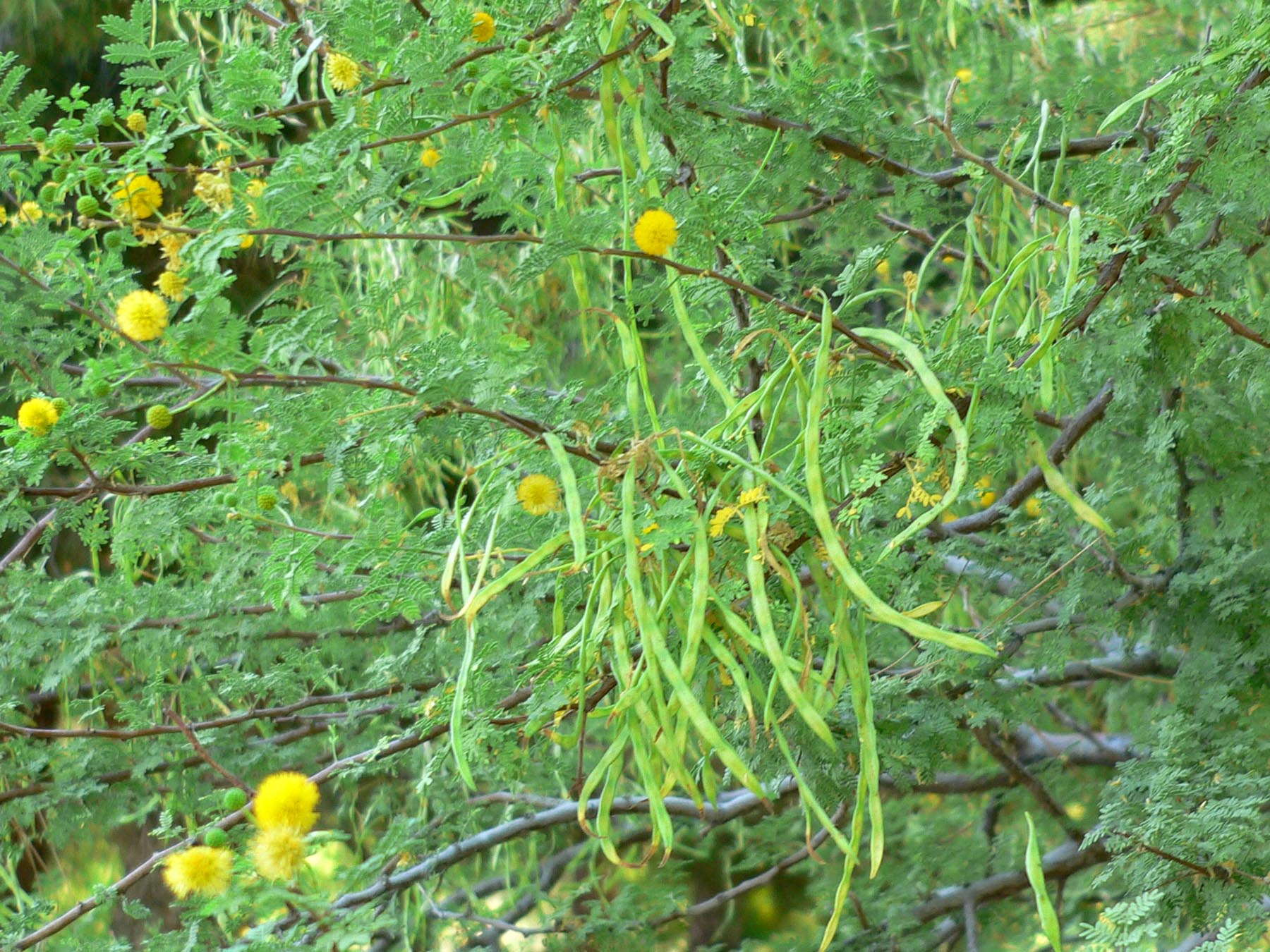
Vachellia constricta seed pods

== Cultivation ==
Vachellia constricta is cultivated by specialty plant nurseries as an ornamental plant. It is used in native plant desert habitat gardens. It can be trained as a small tree or grown as a barrier hedges.
