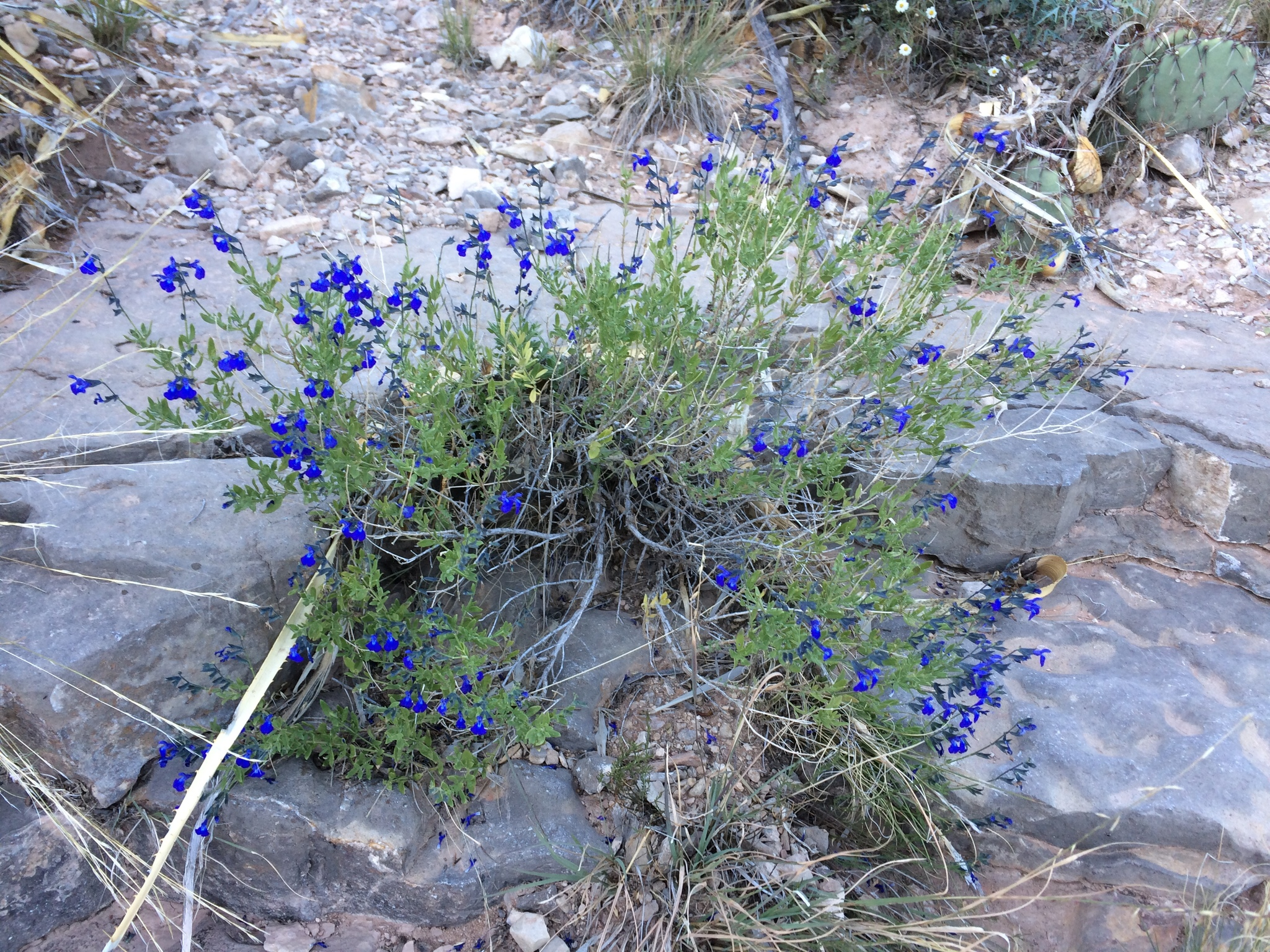

Scientific classification
- Kingdom: Plantae
- Clade: Tracheophytes
- Clade: Angiosperms
- Clade: Eudicots
- Clade: Asterids
- Order: Lamiales
- Family: Lamiaceae
- Genus: Salvia
- Species: S. lycioides

Binomial name
- Salvia lycioides A.Gray

= Salvia lycioides =

Species of flowering plant

Salvia lycioides (Canyon sage) is a perennial native to a wide area ranging from west Texas and New Mexico in the U.S., south through Mexico to the state of San Luis Potosi. It typically grows on dry limestone hills and canyons above 5,000 feet elevation. It was named in 1886 by Asa Gray, the most respected American botanist of the 19th century. The specific epithet, "lycioides", from the Greek, is due to the plant's resemblance to Lycium, a genus also known as "boxthorn" in the nightshade family.

Salvia lycioides reaches about 1–1.5 feet in height and width, sprawling gracefully, with many branches growing up and out from its base. The small mistletoe-green leaves cover the plant, are less than 1 inch long and .5 inch wide, and are evergreen in a mild climate. The bright cornflower-blue flowers bloom mostly in the spring and fall, when the nights are cooler, with sparse blooming during the summer.

It is relatively unknown in horticulture. A selection named "Guadalupe Mountain Form" has smaller leaves and flowers, which are a deep delphinium blue.
