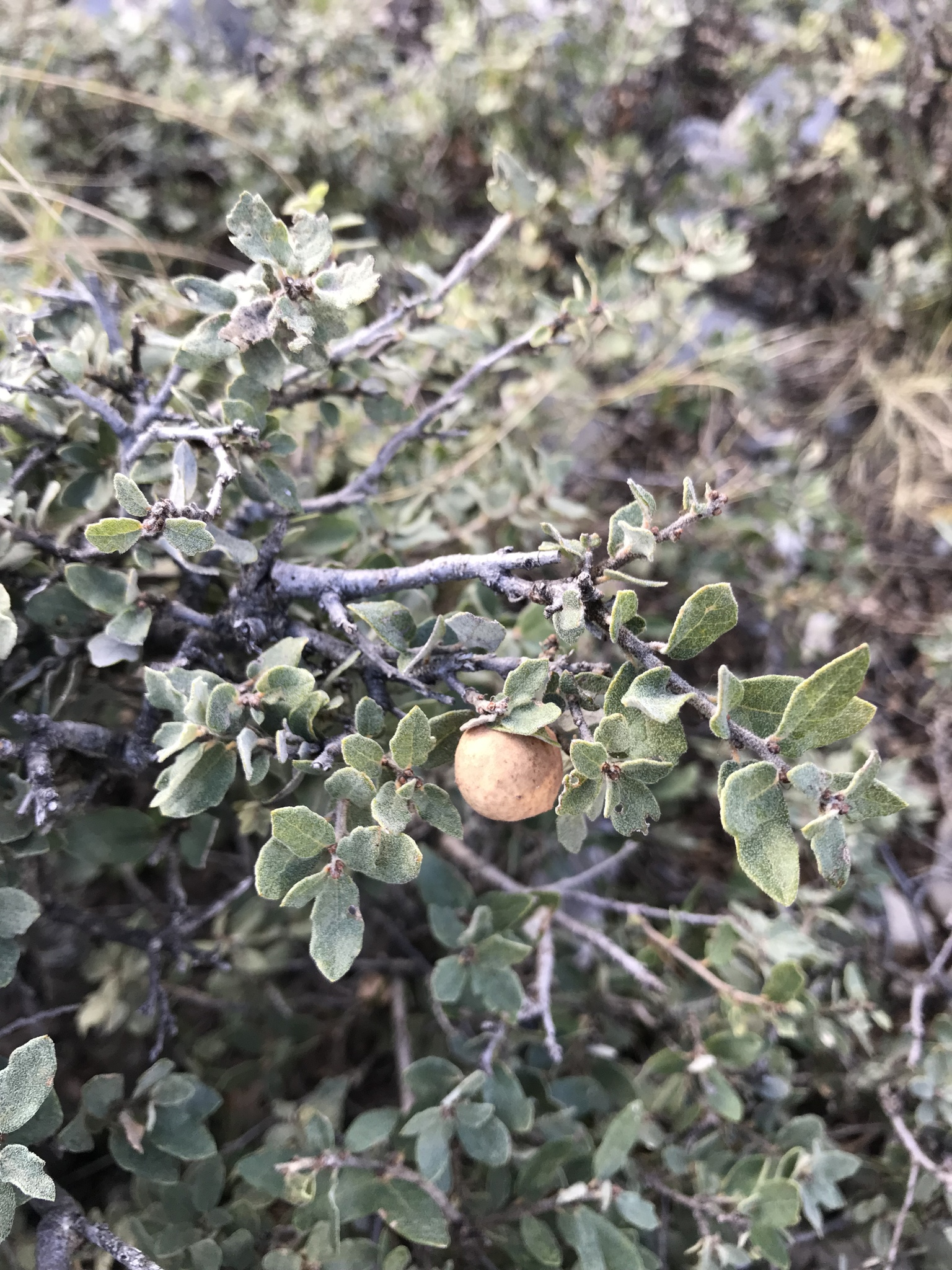

Conservation status
- Least Concern (IUCN 3.1)

Scientific classification
- Kingdom: Plantae
- Clade: Embryophytes
- Clade: Tracheophytes
- Clade: Spermatophytes
- Clade: Angiosperms
- Clade: Eudicots
- Clade: Rosids
- Order: Fagales
- Family: Fagaceae
- Genus: Quercus
- Subgenus: Quercus subg. Quercus
- Section: Quercus sect. Quercus
- Species: Q. intricata

Binomial name
- Quercus intricata Trel.

Synonyms
- Quercus microphylla var. crispata A. DC.; Quercus intricata Trel.; Quercus intricata f. angusta Trel.; Quercus intricata f. erratica Trel.; Quercus intricata f. ovata Trel.

= Quercus intricata =

Species of flowering plant

Quercus intricata, common name dwarf oak, intricate oak or Coahuila scrub oak, is a plant species native to northern Mexico and western Texas.

== Description ==
Quercus intricata is an evergreen shrub that reproduces vegetatively, producing large colonies.

The leaves are thick, leathery, usually wavy, oblong to ovate, up to 2.5 centimetres (1 inch) long. The upper side of the leaf is green with scattered clumps of small curly hairs; the underside appears white or brown because of a thick coat of curly hairs.

== Distribution ==
It is common in mountains of the Chihuahuan Desert, in the states of Coahuila, Nuevo León, Durango, and Zacatecas. In the United States, it has been reported from only two sites: one in the Chisos Mountains inside Big Bend National Park, and the other near Eagle Peak 24 kilometres (15 miles) southwest of Van Horn.

The species prefers open chaparral and woodlands, often on slopes.
