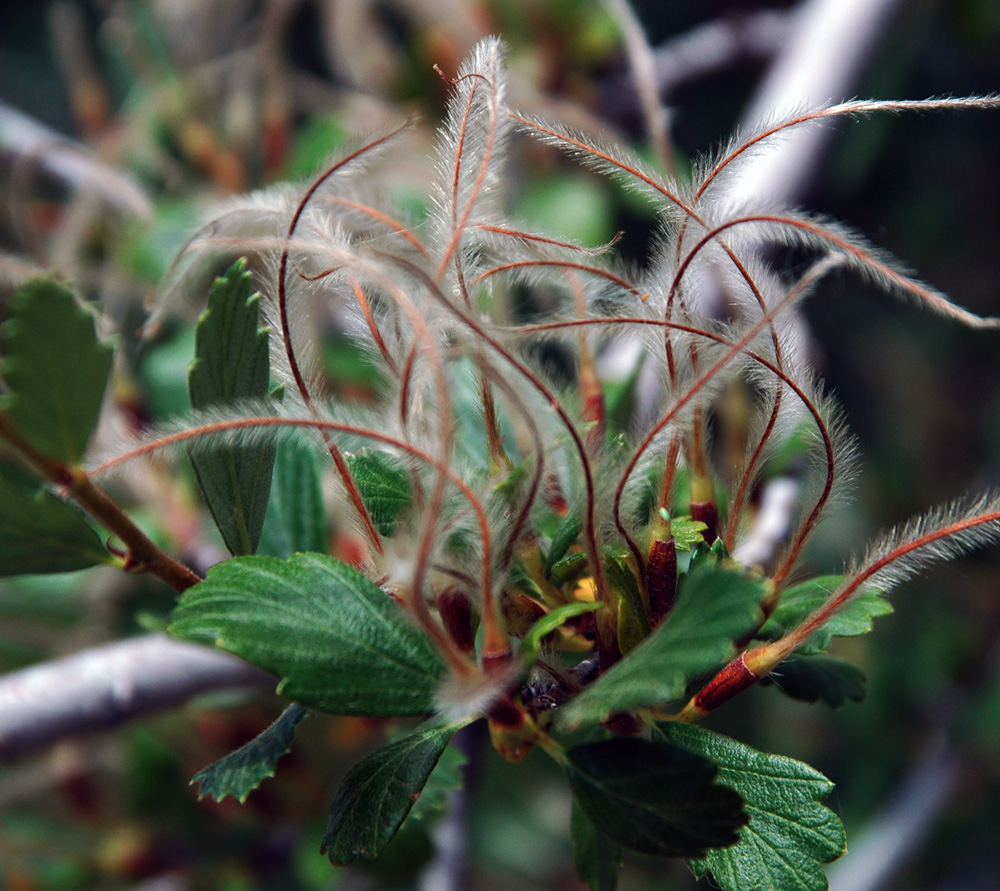
- feather-like achenes are the fruit

Conservation status
- Secure (NatureServe)

Scientific classification
- Kingdom: Plantae
- Clade: Tracheophytes
- Clade: Angiosperms
- Clade: Eudicots
- Clade: Rosids
- Order: Rosales
- Family: Rosaceae
- Genus: Cercocarpus
- Species: C. montanus

Binomial name
- Cercocarpus montanus Raf.

Varieties
- C. m. var. montanus (autonym); C. m. var. argenteus (Rydb.) F.L.Martin

Synonyms
- Cercocarpus argenteus Rydb.; Cercocarpus flabellifolius Rydb.; Cercocarpus minutiflorus Abrams; Cercocarpus parvifolius var. paucidentatus S. Watson; Cercocarpus paucidentatus (S. Watson) Britton

= Cercocarpus montanus =

Species of flowering plant

Cercocarpus montanus is a North American species of shrub or small tree in the family Rosaceae native to northern Mexico and the western United States. It is known by the common names alder-leaf mountain-mahogany, alder-leaf cercocarpus, and true mountain-mahogany. The variety argenteus is commonly known as silverleaf mountain-mahogany.

== Distribution ==
Cercocarpus montanus is common in chaparral scrub, on mesas, the lower foothills of the Rocky Mountains, and the Great Plains in the United States. Its range extends from Montana, Idaho, and South Dakota south as far as Sonora, Durango, and Nuevo León.

== Description and ecology ==
Cercocarpus montanus often remains under 1 metre (3.3 ft) in height because of browsing by elk and deer, but can reach 20 feet (6.1 m). It has thin and smooth bark. The species is considered to be long lived.

It is also eaten by yellow-haired porcupine.

== Cultivation ==
Alder-leaf mountain-mahogany is sometimes grown as a drought tolerant garden plant, particularly in its native range. It is relatively unobtrusive in most seasons, but is noted for the beauty of is seed in the fall. The wildflower writer Claude A. Barr said that the shiny hairs on the curled plumbs attached to the are particularly attractive in the sun.

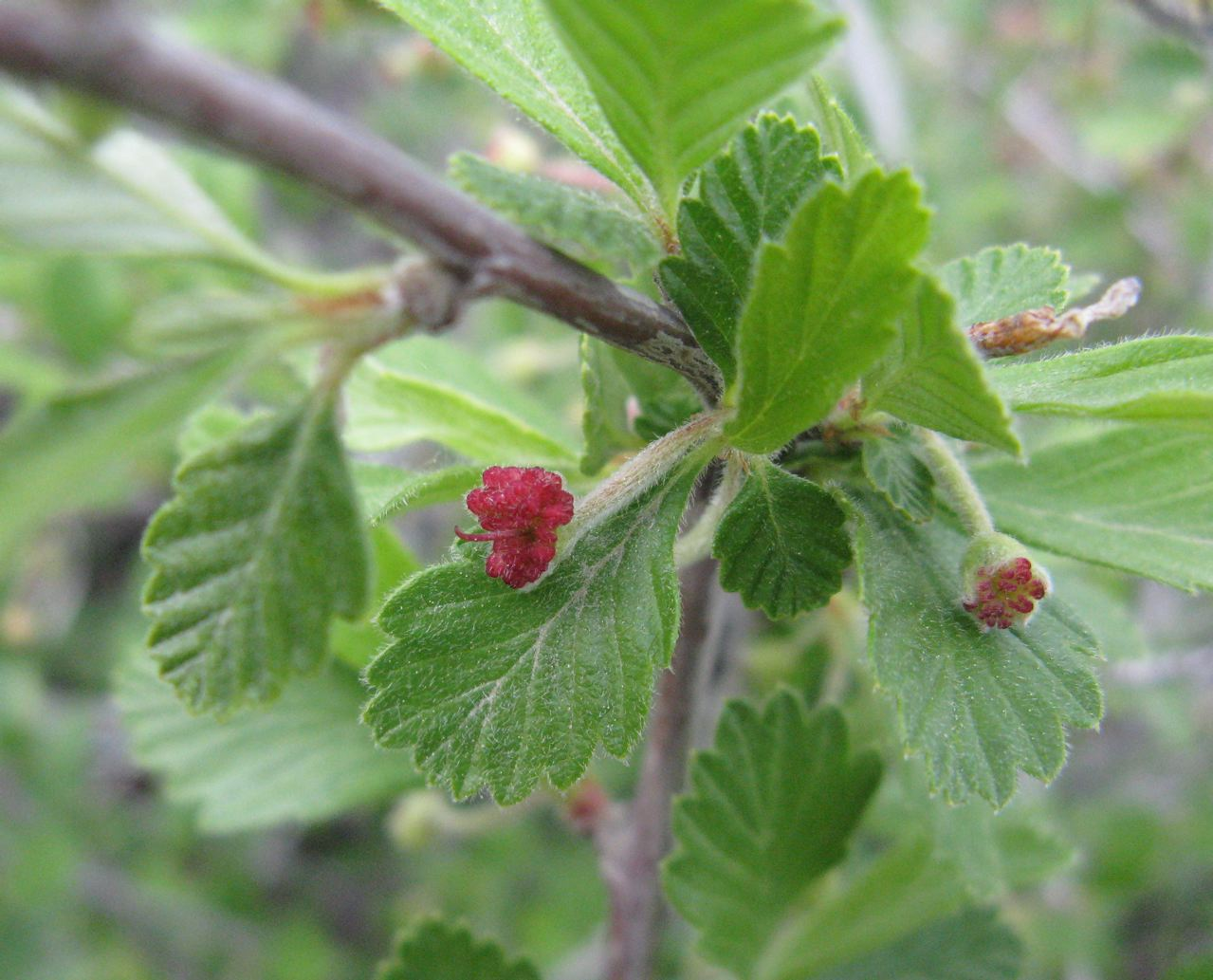
Flowers appear red when they first open

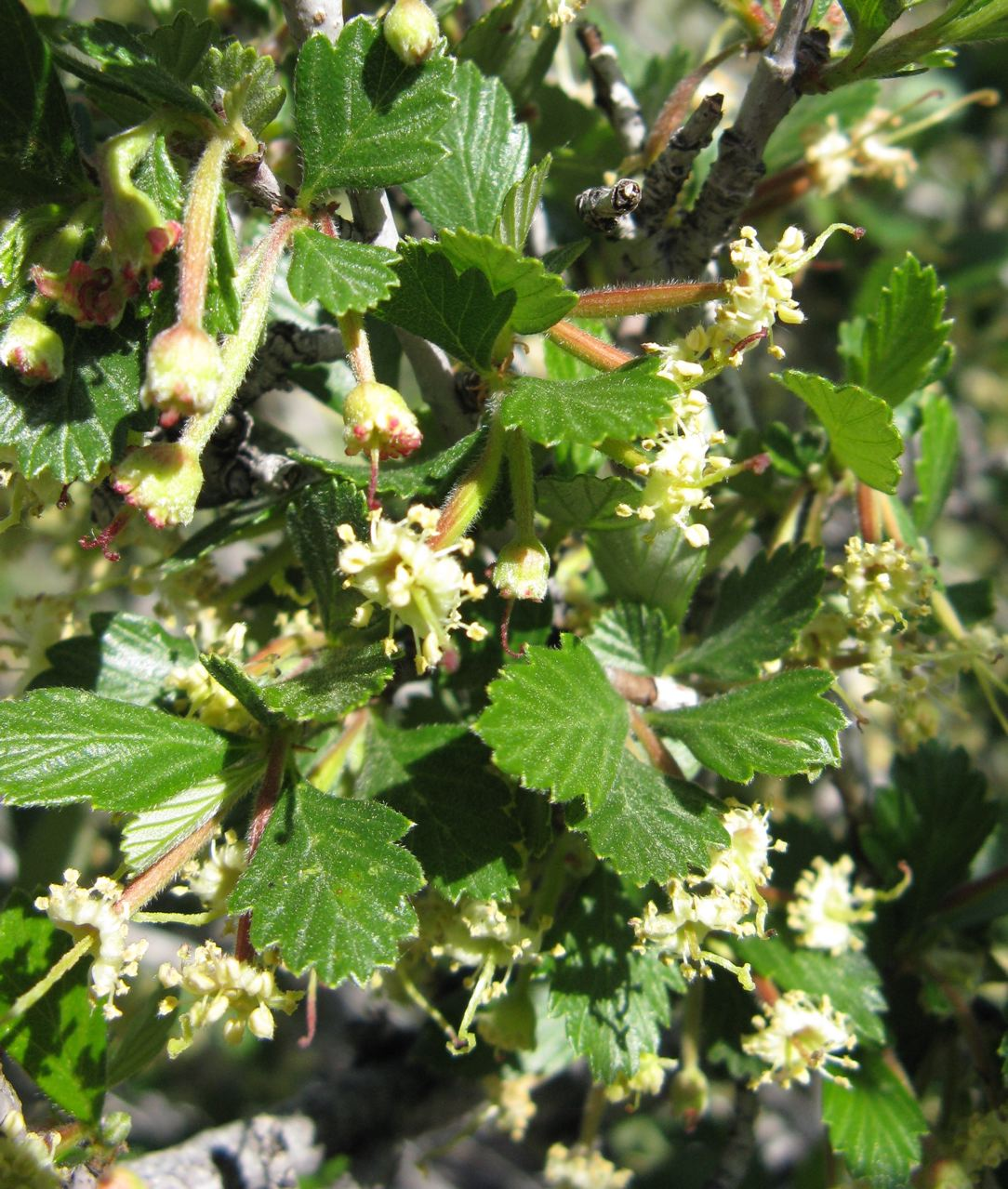
Flowers are yellow when fully expanded
