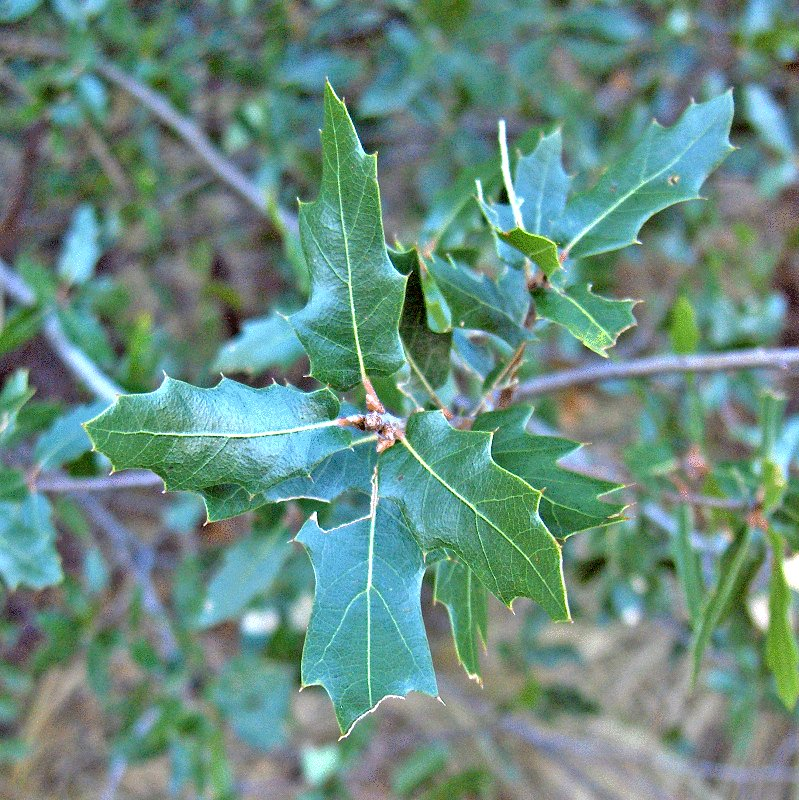

Conservation status
- Least Concern (IUCN 3.1)

Scientific classification
- Kingdom: Plantae
- Clade: Embryophytes
- Clade: Tracheophytes
- Clade: Spermatophytes
- Clade: Angiosperms
- Clade: Eudicots
- Clade: Rosids
- Order: Fagales
- Family: Fagaceae
- Genus: Quercus
- Subgenus: Quercus subg. Quercus
- Section: Quercus sect. Quercus
- Species: Q. vaseyana

Binomial name
- Quercus vaseyana Buckley

Synonyms
- Homotypic synonyms: Quercus pungens var. vaseyana (Buckley) C.H.Mull.; Quercus pungens subsp. vaseyana (Buckley) A.E.Murray; Quercus undulata var. vaseyana (Buckley) Rydb.; Heterotypic synonyms: Quercus sillae Trel.

= Quercus vaseyana =

Species of oak tree

Quercus vaseyana is a species of tree in the beech family Fagaceae. It is native to northern Mexico and the U.S. state of Texas. The specific epithet vaseyana honors the American botanist George Vasey. The species is commonly called the Vasey oak.

== Description ==
Quercus vaseyana is a shrub or small tree up to 10 metres (33 feet) tall. The bark is brown. The leaves are narrow, up to 9 centimetres (3 1/2 inches) long, thick and leathery, with a few teeth or shallow lobes.

== Taxonomy ==
Quercus vaseyana was named and described by the American botanist Samuel Botsford Buckley in 1883. It was named in honor of Dr. George Vasey, who was then the Chief Botanist at the United States Department of Agriculture.

== Distribution and habitat ==
Quercus vaseyana is native to northern Mexico (Chihuahua, Coahuila, and Nuevo León) and the U.S. state of Texas.

== Bibliography ==
- Buckley, S. B. (1883). "Some new Texan plants". Bulletin of the Torrey Botanical Club. 10 (8): 90–91. doi:10.2307/2476848. JSTOR 2476848.
