= Therinia spinicauda =

Scientific classification
- Kingdom: Animalia
- Phylum: Arthropoda
- Clade: Pancrustacea
- Class: Insecta
- Order: Lepidoptera
- Family: Saturniidae
- Genus: Therinia
- Species: T. spinicauda

Binomial name
- Therinia spinicauda Jordan, 1924

Species of moth

Therinia spinicauda is a species of moth belonging to the subfamily Oxyteninae and the genus Therinia. It was first discovered by Karl Jordan in 1924. The moth has similar striping to Therinia transversaria, but is a different species. The validity of this species is doubtful or potentially valid.
