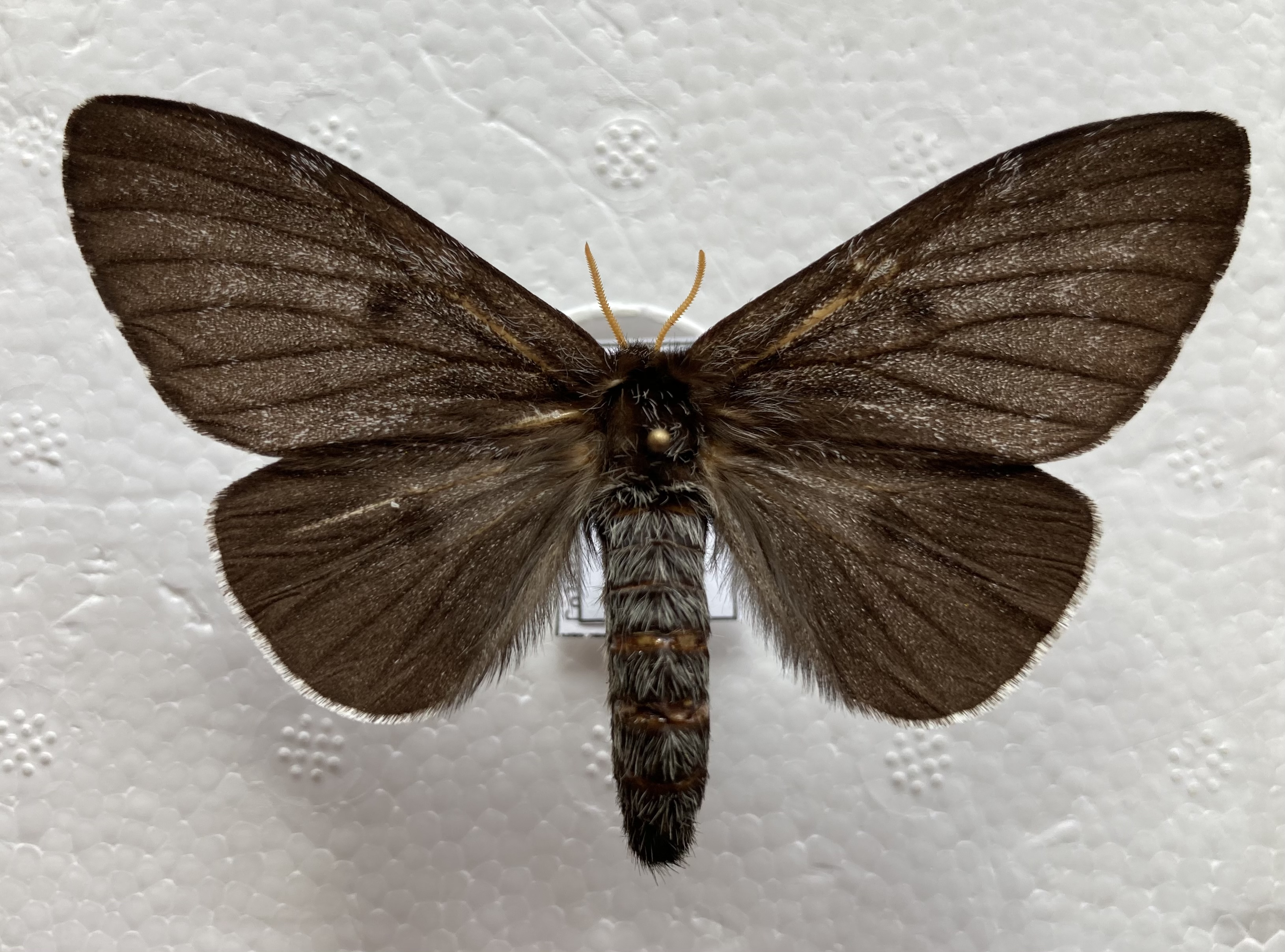
- Female specimen of Coloradia prchali
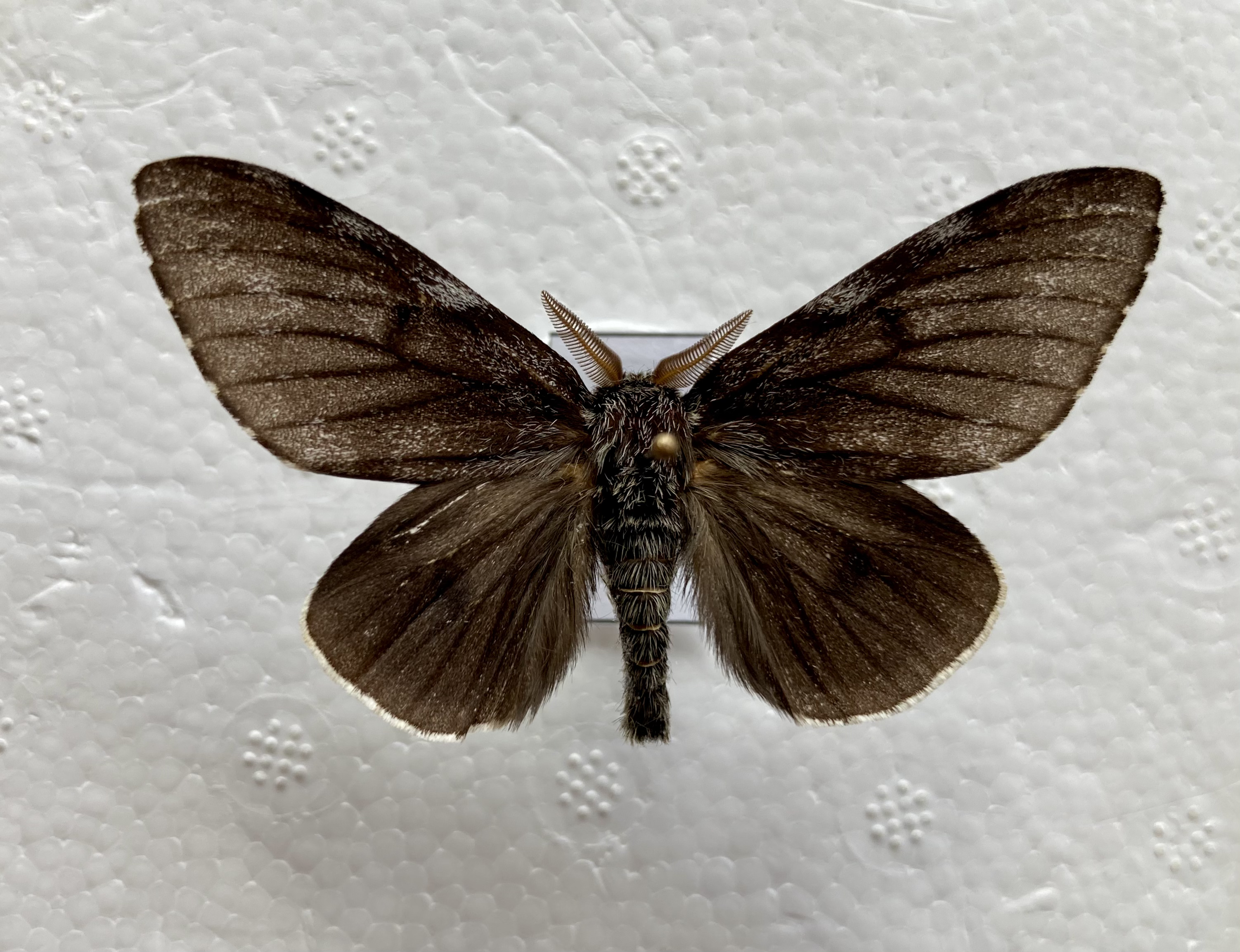
- Male specimen of Coloradia prchali.

Scientific classification
- Kingdom: Animalia
- Phylum: Arthropoda
- Class: Insecta
- Order: Lepidoptera
- Family: Saturniidae
- Genus: Coloradia
- Species: C. prchali

Binomial name
- Coloradia prchali Lemaire & M.J. Smith, 1992

= Coloradia prchali =

Species of moth

Coloradia prchali or Prchal's pinemoth, is a species of hemileucine silkmoth (Saturniidae) from eastern Sonora and western Chihuahua in the Sierra Madre Occidental pine–oak forests. Its habitat includes conifer-oak forest composed of Pinus ponderosa, Pinus engelmannii, Pinus leiophylla, Juniperus deppeana, Quercus arizonica, Quercus grisea and Quercus viminea.
