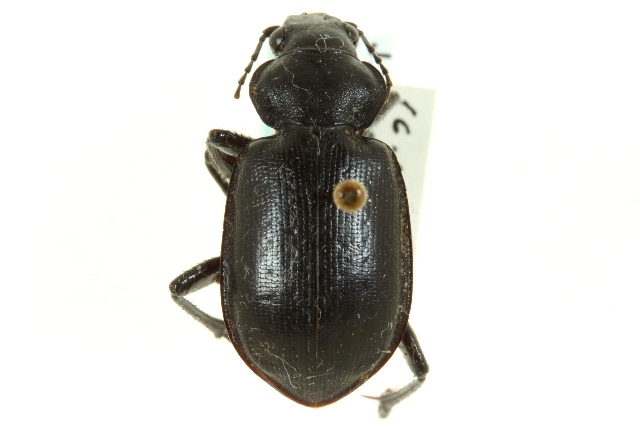

Scientific classification
- Domain: Eukaryota
- Kingdom: Animalia
- Phylum: Arthropoda
- Class: Insecta
- Order: Coleoptera
- Suborder: Adephaga
- Family: Carabidae
- Genus: Calosoma
- Species: C. obsoletum

Binomial name
- Calosoma obsoletum Say, 1823

Synonyms
- Calosoma indistinctum LeConte, 1845; Calosoma microstictum Casey, 1897

= Calosoma obsoletum =

Species of beetle

Calosoma obsoletum, the old beautiful black searcher, is a species of ground beetle in the subfamily of Carabinae. It was described by Say in 1823. This species is found in Alberta, Manitoba, Saskatchewan, Colorado, Iowa, Idaho, Kansas, Minnesota, Montana, North Dakota, Nebraska, New Mexico, Nevada, Oregon, South Dakota, Utah and Wyoming, where it inhabits open prairies, rangelands and cultivated fields.

Both adults and larvae prey on lepidopterous caterpillars, including Hemileuca oliviae.
