= Therinia buckleyi =

Scientific classification
- Kingdom: Animalia
- Phylum: Arthropoda
- Clade: Pancrustacea
- Class: Insecta
- Order: Lepidoptera
- Family: Saturniidae
- Genus: Therinia
- Species: T. buckleyi

Binomial name
- Therinia buckleyi Druce, 1890

Species of moth

Therinia buckleyi is a species of moth that was discovered in 1890 by Herbert Druce. It can be commonly confused for the grey swallowtail moth, Micronia aculeata.
