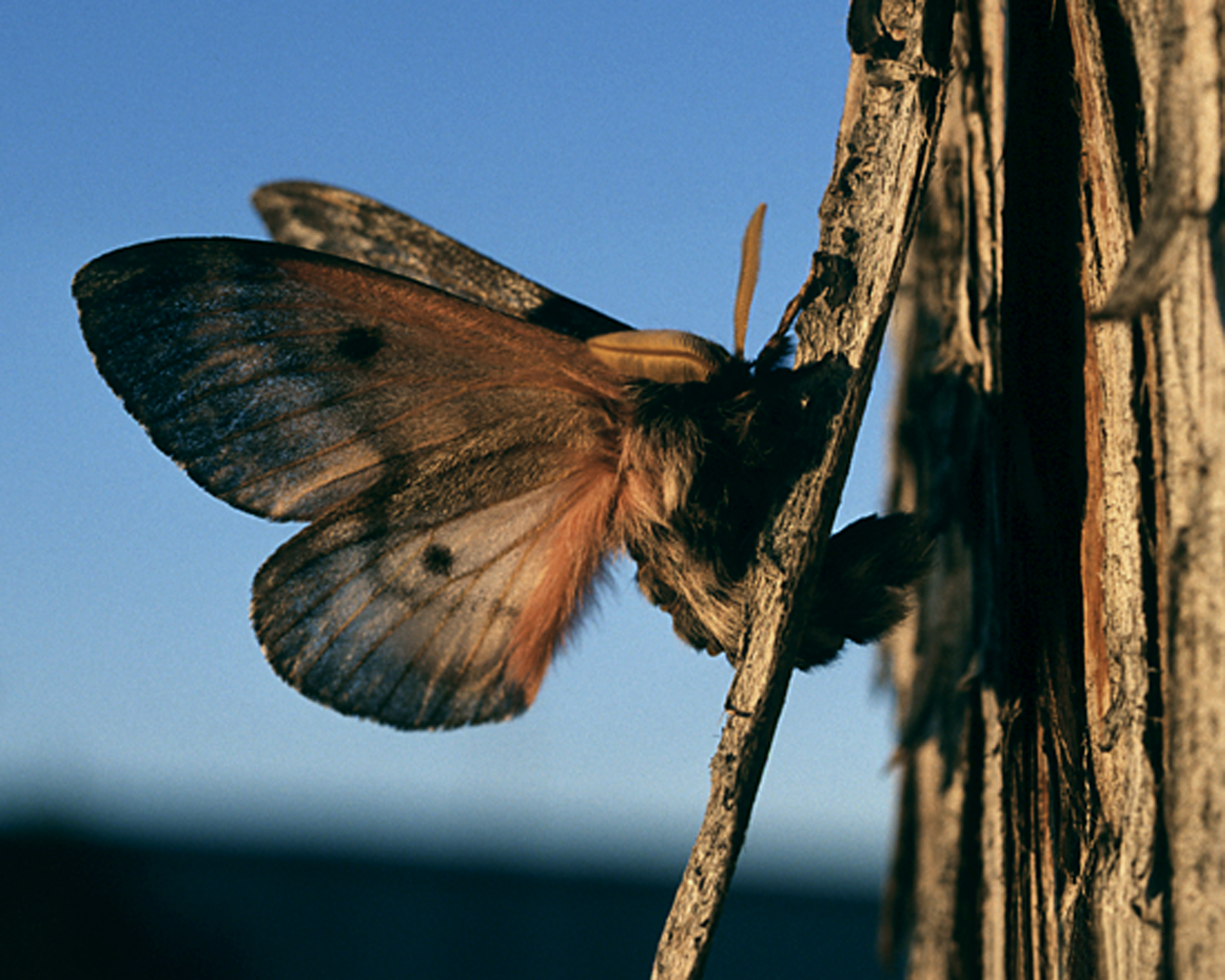
- Pandora moth (Coloradia pandora)

Scientific classification
- Domain: Eukaryota
- Kingdom: Animalia
- Phylum: Arthropoda
- Class: Insecta
- Order: Lepidoptera
- Family: Saturniidae
- Subfamily: Hemileucinae
- Genus: Coloradia; C. A. Blake, 1863

= Coloradia =

Genus of moths

Coloradia is a genus of moths of the family Saturniidae. There are nine described species found in Mexico and eastern North America. The genus was first described by C. A. Blake in 1863.

These are generally large moths, predominantly grey in colour. The larvae usually feed on pines and members of the genus are commonly called pinemoths, although Coloradia pandora has been recorded on aspen.

== Species ==
- Coloradia casanovai Beutelspacher, 1993
- Coloradia doris Barnes, 1900 - Doris' pinemoth
- Coloradia euphrosyne Dyar, 1912
- Coloradia guerreroiana Brechlin & Meister, 2010
- Coloradia hoffmanni Beutelspacher, 1978
- Coloradia jaliscensis Brechlin & Meister, 2010
- Coloradia luski Barnes & Benjamin, 1926 - Lusk's pinemoth
- Coloradia oaxacaensis Brechlin & Meister, 2010
- Coloradia pandora C. A. Blake, 1863 - Pandora pinemoth
- Coloradia paraguerreroiana Brechlin & Meister, 2010
- Coloradia prchali Lemaire & M.J. Smith, 1992 - Prchal's pinemoth
- Coloradia smithi Lemaire, 2002
- Coloradia vazquezae Beutelspacher, 1978
- Coloradia velda J.W. Johnson & Walter, 1981 - Velda pinemoth
