= Coloradia doris =

Scientific classification
- Domain: Eukaryota
- Kingdom: Animalia
- Phylum: Arthropoda
- Class: Insecta
- Order: Lepidoptera
- Family: Saturniidae
- Genus: Coloradia
- Species: C. doris

Binomial name
- Coloradia doris Barnes, 1900

Species of moth

Coloradia doris, or Doris' pinemoth, is a species of moth in the family Saturniidae ("giant silkworm and royal moths"), in the superfamily Bombycoidea ("silkworm, sphinx, and royal moths"). The species was described by William Barnes in 1900. It is found in North America. Larvae have been found on Pinus ponderosa and adults have been found on Pinus contorta and Pinus monophylla. Early instar larvae feed in groups, whereas late instar larvae are solitary feeders. The species overwinters as a pupa, with adults emerging in spring and summer.

The MONA or Hodges number for Coloradia doris is 7725.
