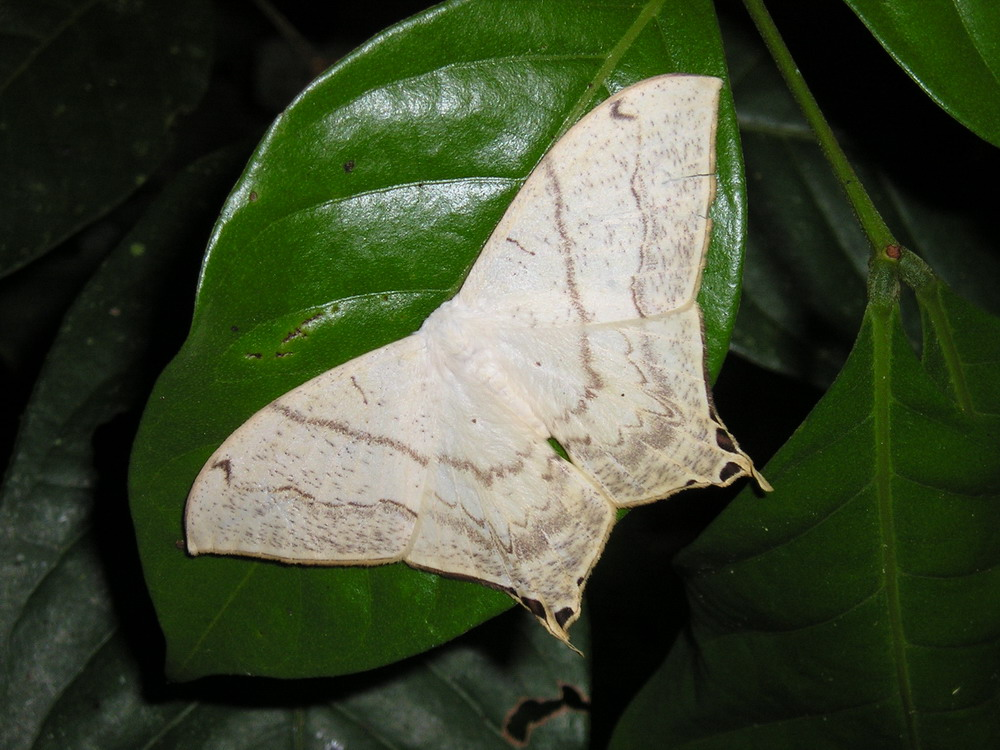

Scientific classification
- Kingdom: Animalia
- Phylum: Arthropoda
- Clade: Pancrustacea
- Class: Insecta
- Order: Lepidoptera
- Family: Saturniidae
- Genus: Therinia
- Species: T. lactucina

Binomial name
- Therinia lactucina Cramer, 1780

= Therinia lactucina =

Species of moth

Therinia lactucina is a species of moth in the family Saturniidae and the genus Therinia. It was first discovered by Pieter Cramer in 1780.

Two female specimens exist in the Natural History Museum, London. They were reportedly collected by Spencer Moore, in Paraguay, however this is false, and they were collected during the Percy Sladen Mato Grosso Expedition (1891-1892), in Brazil.

A subspecies of the moth, T. lactucina lactandensis, was described by Brechlin and Meister in 2014.
