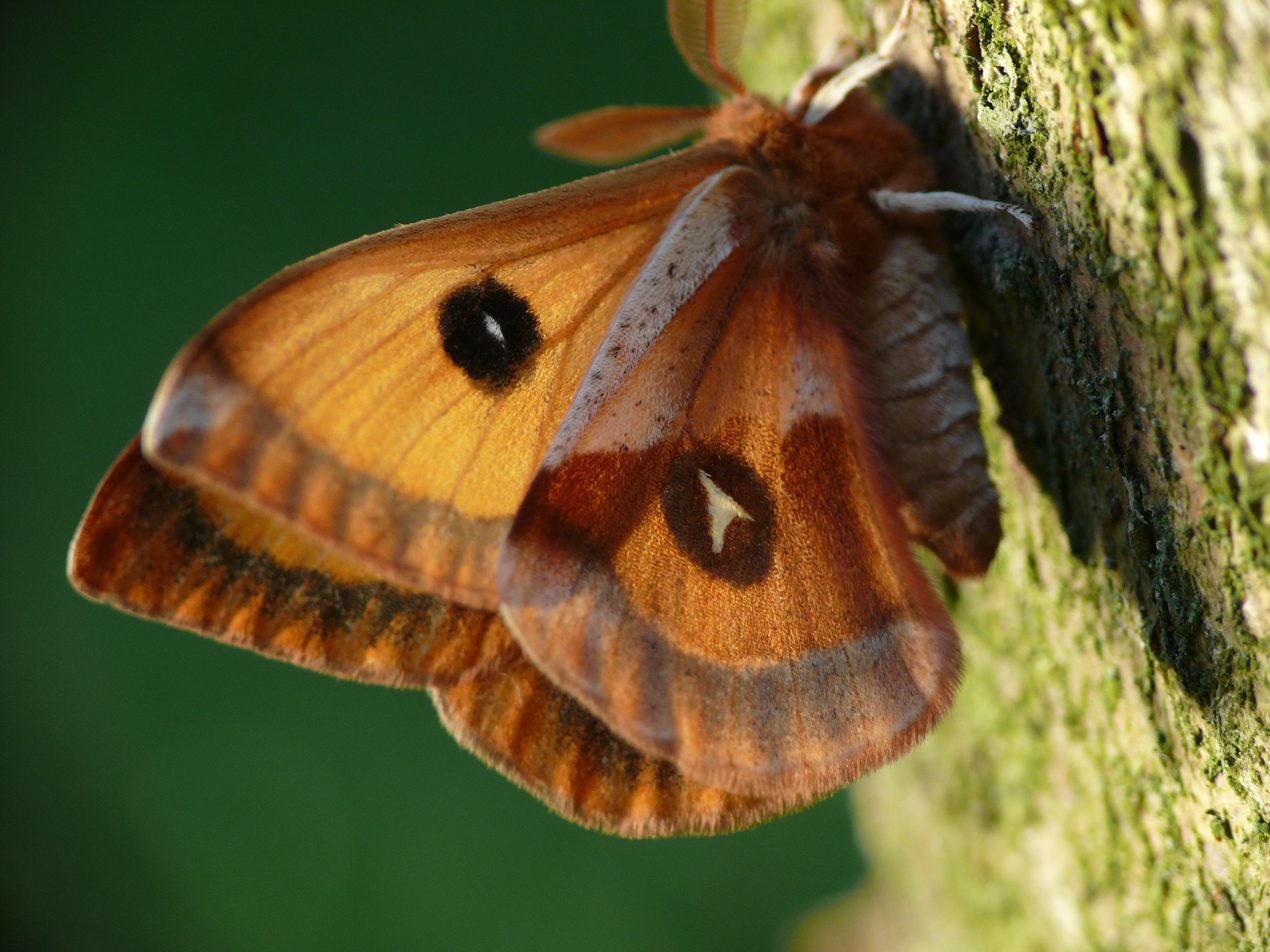

Scientific classification
- Kingdom: Animalia
- Phylum: Arthropoda
- Class: Insecta
- Order: Lepidoptera
- Family: Saturniidae
- Genus: Aglia
- Species: A. tau

Binomial name
- Aglia tau (Linnaeus, 1758)

Synonyms
- Phalaena (Bombyx) Tau Linnaeus, 1758

= Aglia tau =

Species of moth

== Overview ==
Aglia tau, the tau emperor, is a moth of the family Saturniidae. They are also known as giant silkmoths. It is found in Europe and across Central Asia to the Pacific coast. The species was first described by Carl Linnaeus in his 1758 10th edition of Systema Naturae. Their genus, Aglia, is composed of 6 Palearctic (North European) species.

== Size ==
The wingspan is 60–84 mm. The moth flies from March to July with a univoltine lifecycle depending on the location.

Aglia tau

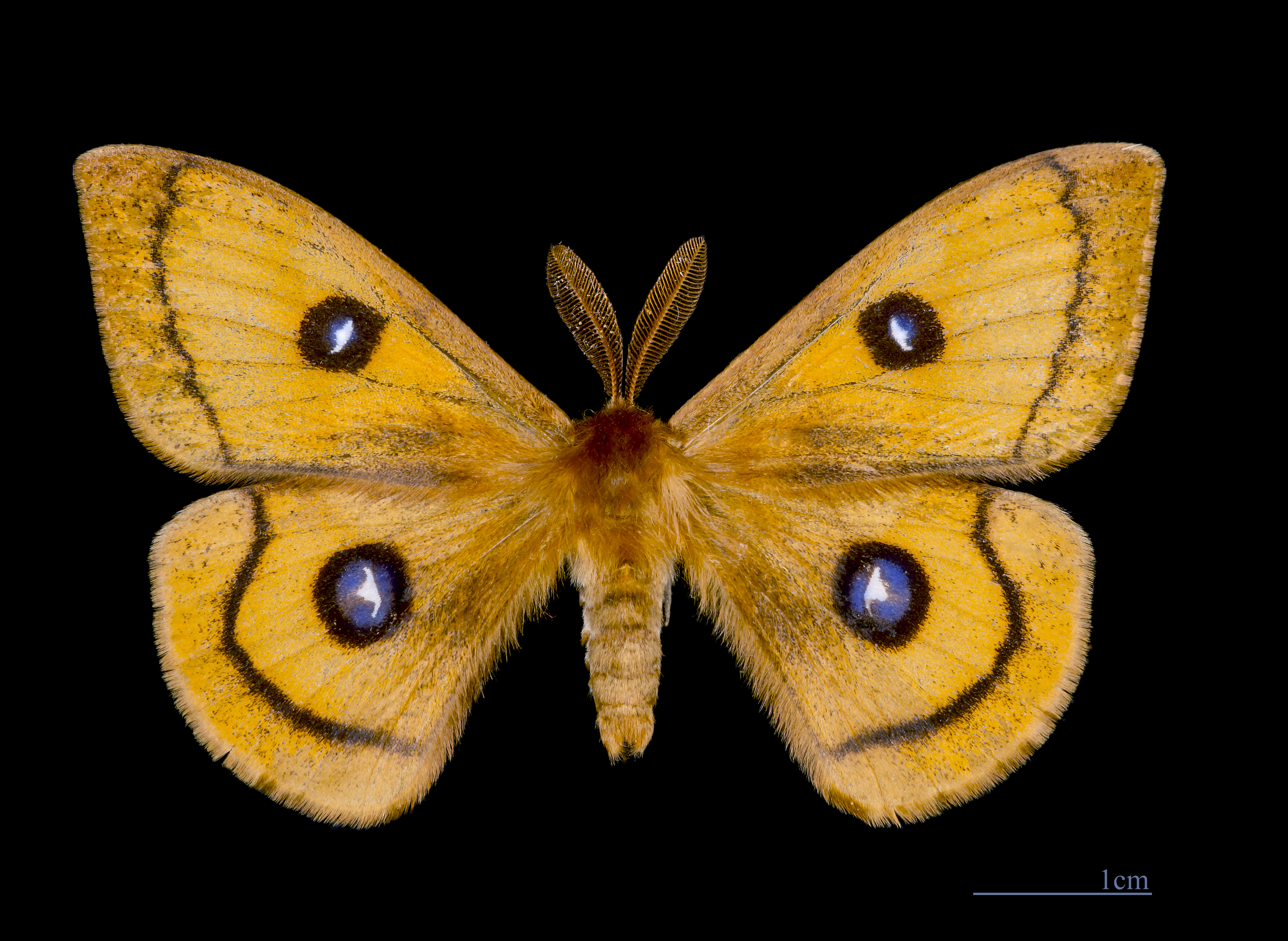
♂

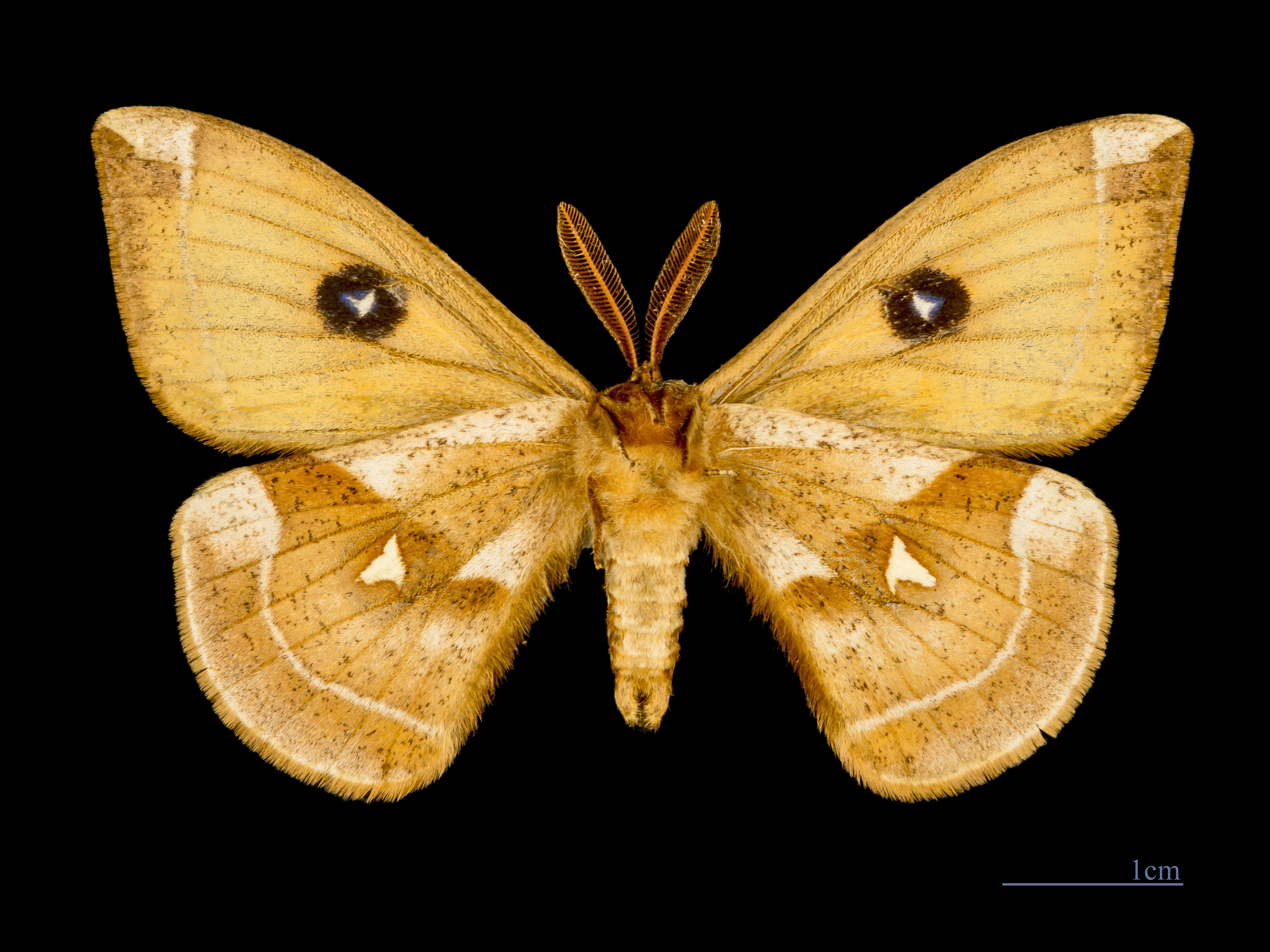
♂ △

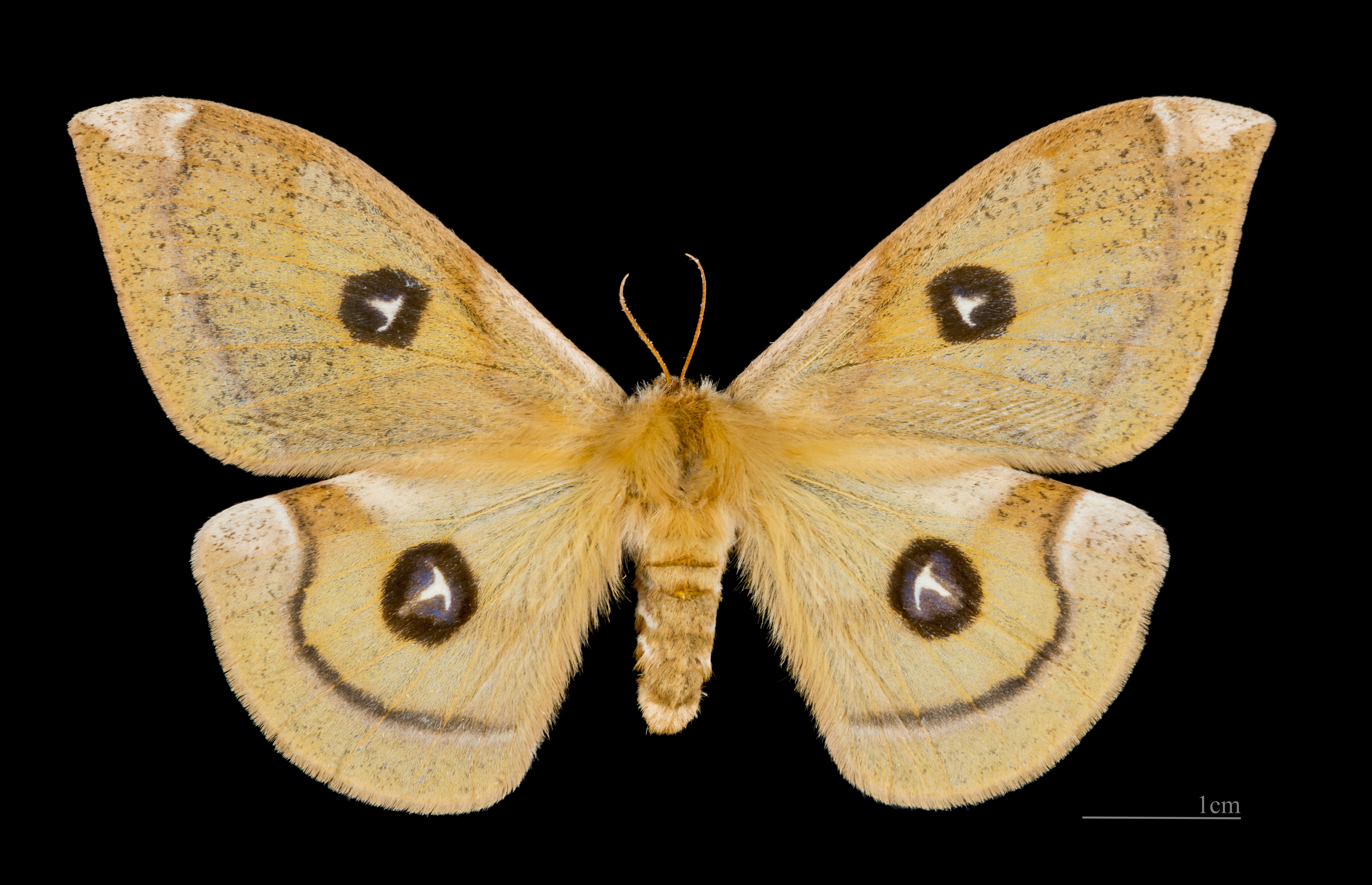
♀

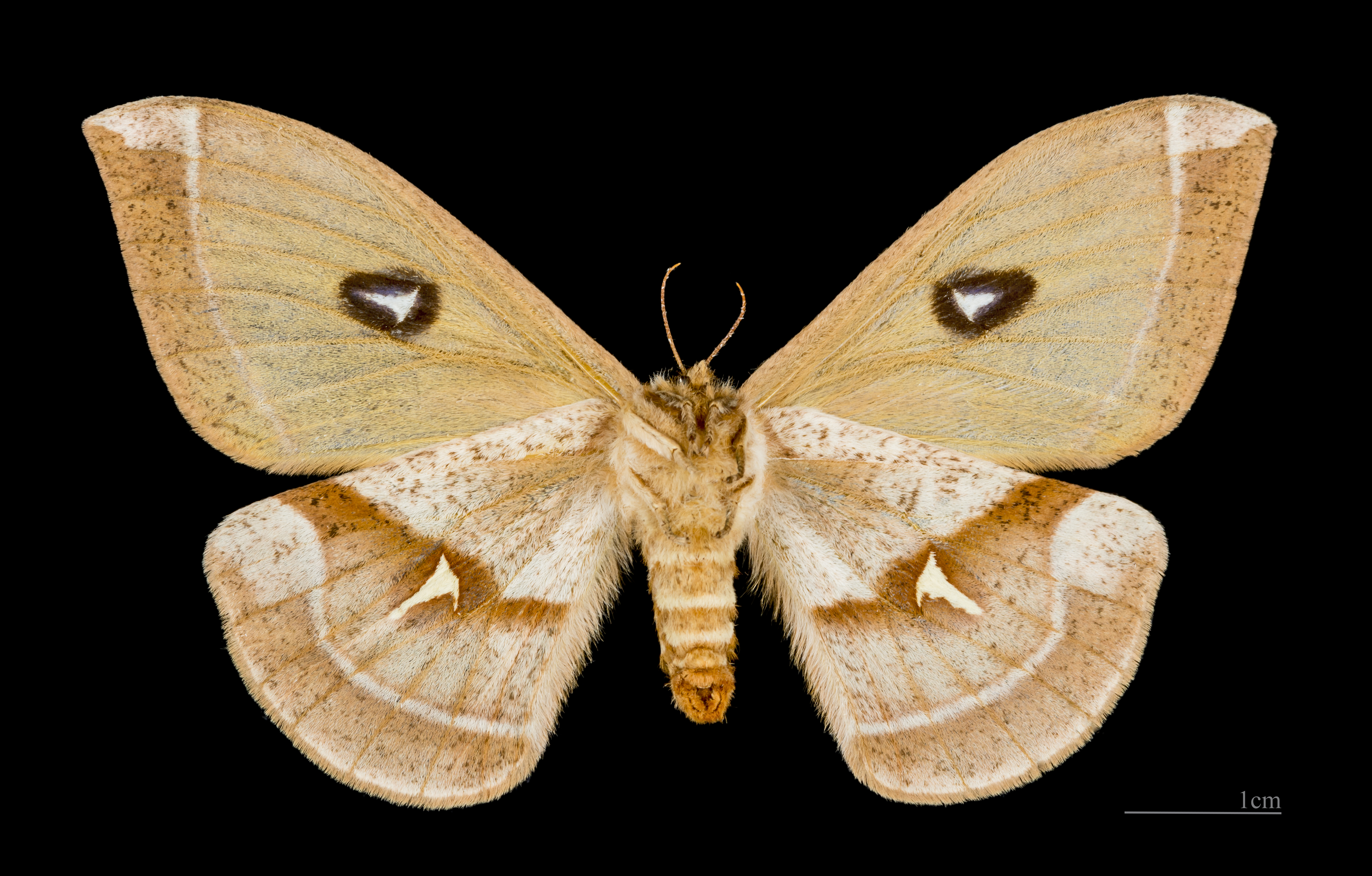
♀ △

Aglia tau f. melaina

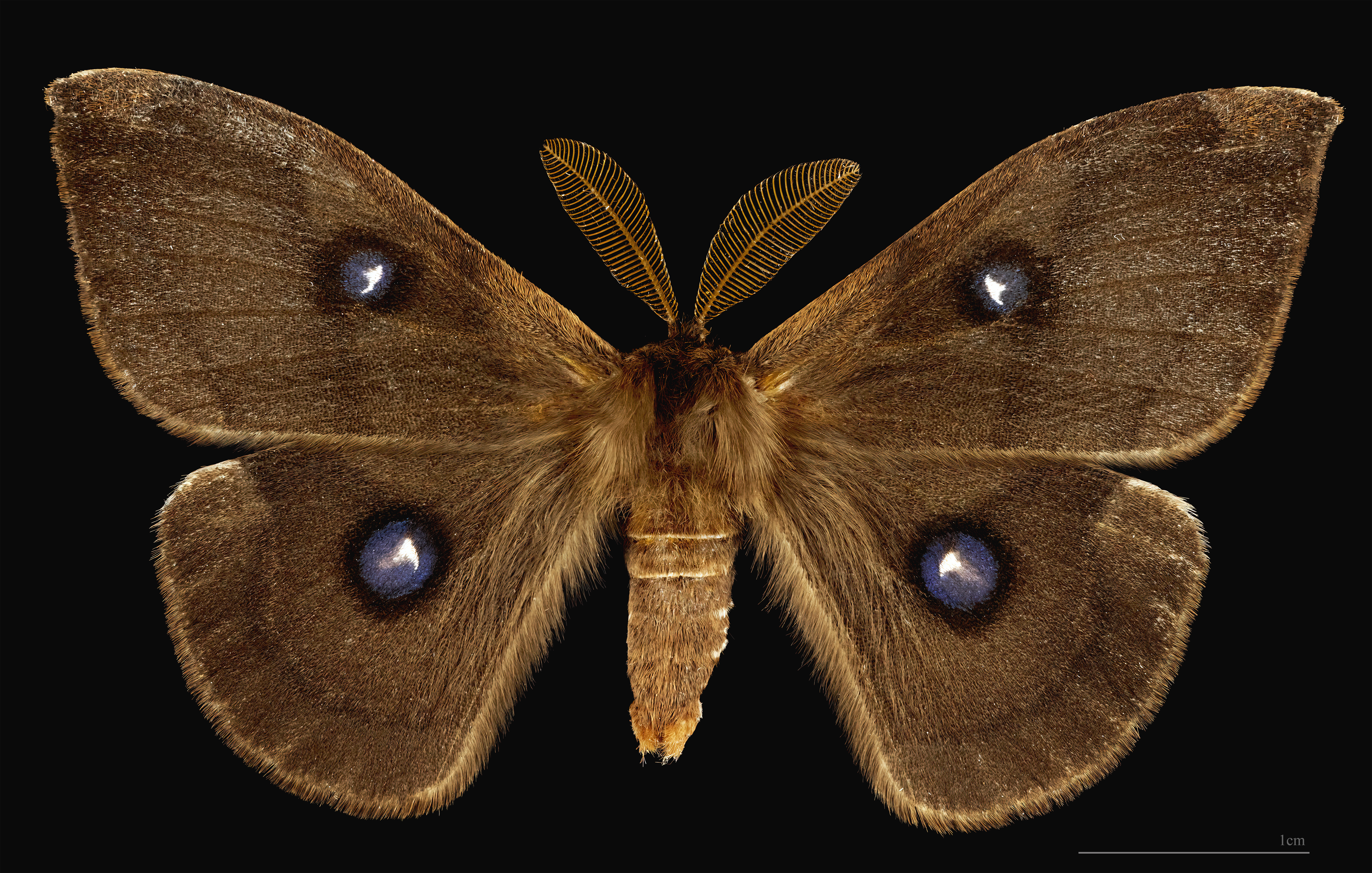
♂

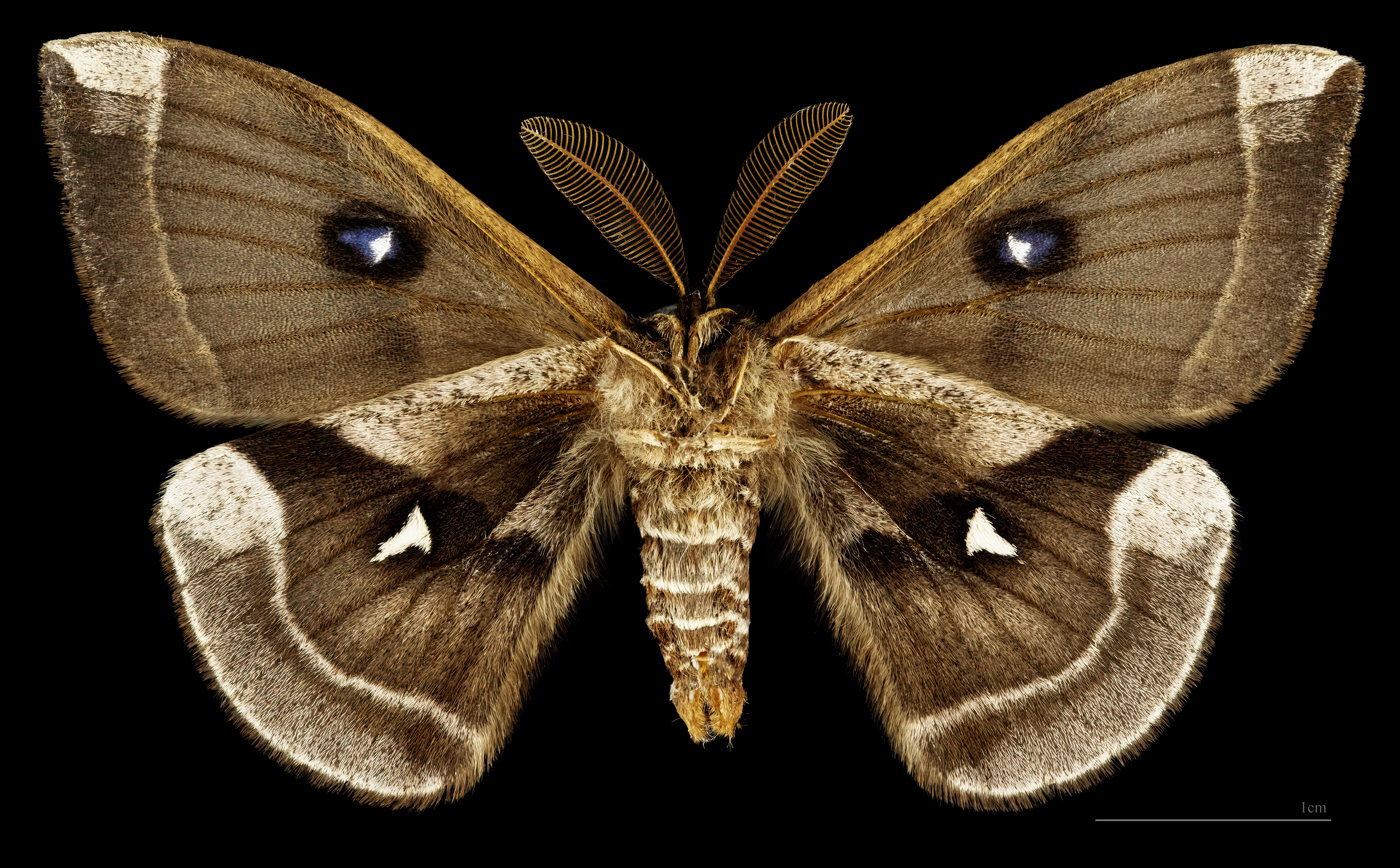
♂ △

♀

♀ △

== Habitat ==
The larvae primarily feed on European beech, but also birch, Alnus glutinosa, Salix caprea and Sorbus aucuparia. The larvae look similar to Royal Walnut Moth caterpillars Citheronia regalis in their earlier instars. They can be found in older growth forests, with a large portion of trees in the Fagaceae family. They can also be found in younger riparian forests with less Fagaceae species present.

== Lifecycle ==
Their life cycle is similar to any Lepidopterans, consisting of 4 stages. Eggs laid by adult females take about 3 weeks to hatch into first instar caterpillars. These grow quickly and go through 4 more instars, for 5 total. Then they pupate on the forest floor. These pupae will overwinter until March, until warmer weather comes and they start developing. Adult moths lack a mouth and only breed. The adult females lay eggs then die.

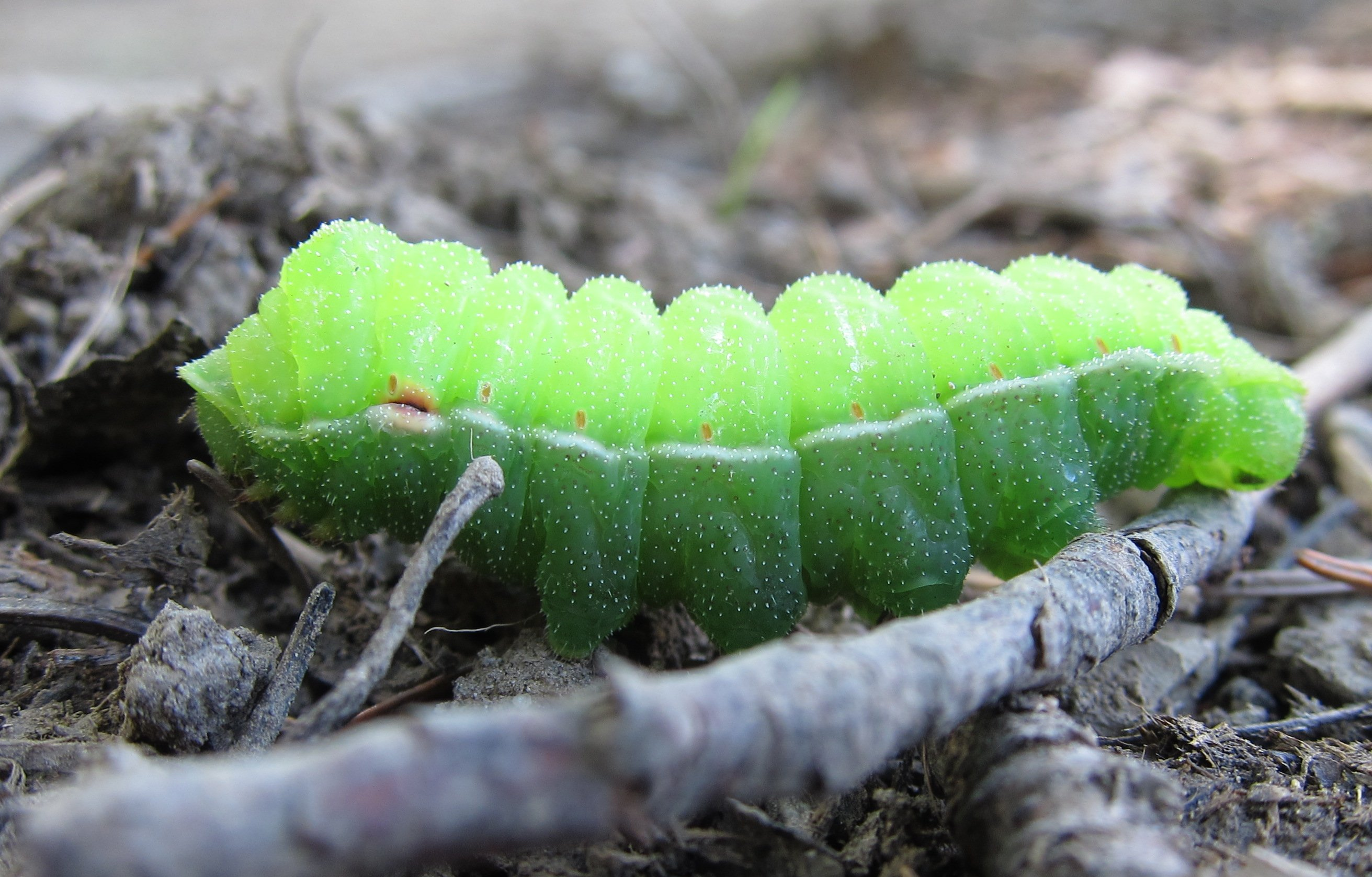
4th instar larva of the Tau Emporer

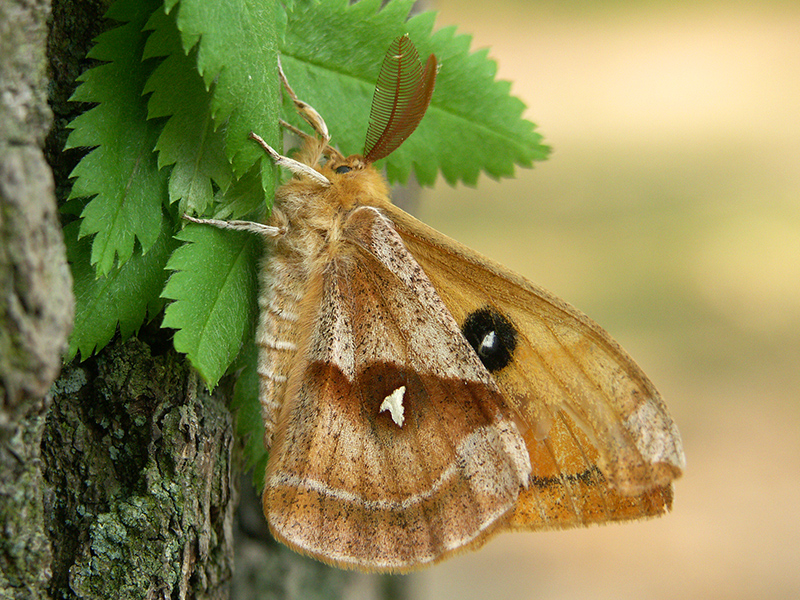
Adult male, ventral view
