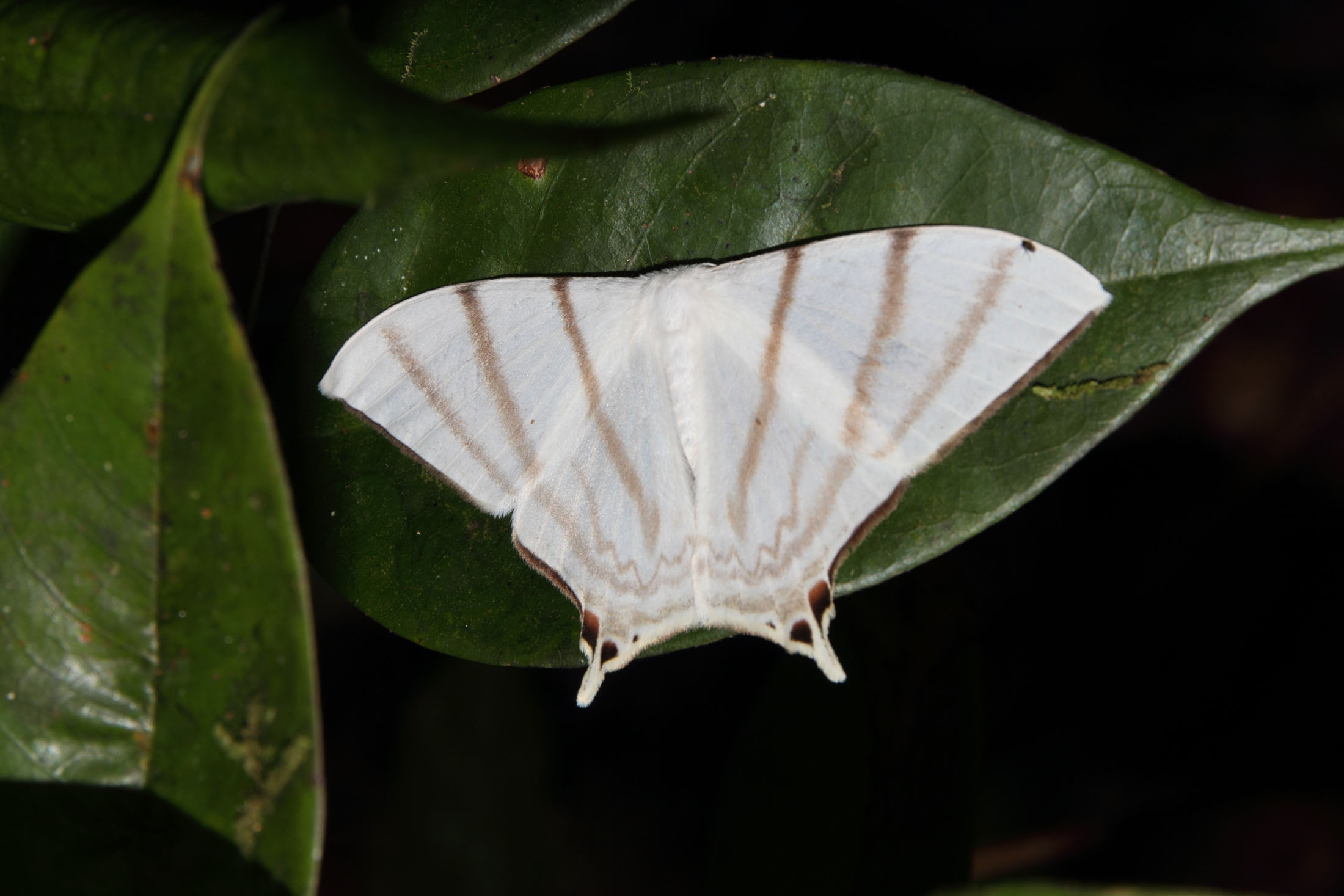

Scientific classification
- Kingdom: Animalia
- Phylum: Arthropoda
- Clade: Pancrustacea
- Class: Insecta
- Order: Lepidoptera
- Family: Saturniidae
- Genus: Therinia
- Species: T. stricturaria

Binomial name
- Therinia stricturaria Hübner, 1825

= Therinia stricturaria =

Species of moth

Therinia stricturaria is a species of moth in the Saturniidae family of moths. It can be found in Brazil and French Guiana [proven], and likely in surrounding countries. It is also known by the name Asthenidia stricturaria. The first recorded occurrence of the name is found in Hubner's Zuträge zur Sammlung exotischer Schmettlinge [sic] : bestehend in Bekundigung einzelner Fliegmuster neuer oder rarer nichteuropäischer Gattungen.
