= Coloradia luski =

Scientific classification
- Kingdom: Animalia
- Phylum: Arthropoda
- Class: Insecta
- Order: Lepidoptera
- Family: Saturniidae
- Genus: Coloradia
- Species: C. luski

Binomial name
- Coloradia luski Barnes & Benjamin, 1926

Species of moth

Coloradia luski, or Lusk's pine moth, is a species of insect in the family Saturniidae. It was first described by William Barnes and Foster Hendrickson Benjamin in 1926 and it is found in North America.

The MONA or Hodges number for Coloradia luski is 7726.
