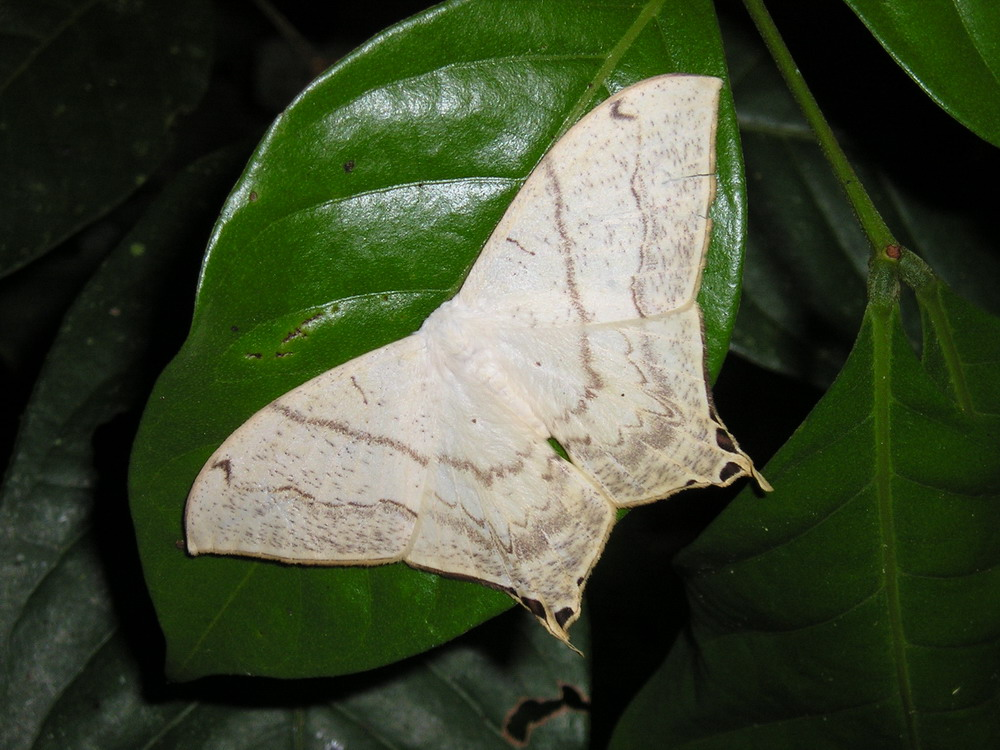
- Therinia aff. lactucina

Scientific classification
- Kingdom: Animalia
- Phylum: Arthropoda
- Clade: Pancrustacea
- Class: Insecta
- Order: Lepidoptera
- Family: Saturniidae
- Subfamily: Oxyteninae
- Genus: Therinia; Hübner, 1823

Species
- See text

Synonyms
- Asthenia Westwood, 1841 (preocc.); Asthenidia Westwood, 1879

= Therinia =

Genus of moths

Therinia is a genus of moths in the family Saturniidae first described by Jacob Hübner in 1823.

== Species ==
- Therinia amphira Druce, 1890
- Therinia buckleyi Druce, 1890
- Therinia celata Jordan, 1924
- Therinia diffissa Jordan, 1924
- Therinia geometraria (Felder, 1862)
- Therinia lactucina (Cramer, 1780)
- Therinia paulina Jordan, 1924
- Therinia podaliriaria (Westwood, 1841)
- Therinia spinicauda Jordan, 1924
- Therinia stricturaria (Hübner, 1825)
- Therinia terminalis Jordan, 1924
- Therinia transversaria Druce, 1887

Additional species have been described (T. camacana, T. diffguyana, T. peggyae, and T. trimacula), but these are debated as there are no morphological differences between these and other existing species. However, due to their differences in DNA, they can be considered separate species in some cases.
