= Therinia amphira =

Scientific classification
- Kingdom: Animalia
- Phylum: Arthropoda
- Clade: Pancrustacea
- Class: Insecta
- Order: Lepidoptera
- Family: Saturniidae
- Genus: Therinia
- Species: T. amphira

Binomial name
- Therinia amphira Druce, 1890

Species of moth

Therinia amphira is a species of moth in the family Saturniidae. It was described by Herbert Druce in 1890.

== Distribution ==
Therinia amphira has been reported to be found in Colombia, Ecuador, and Peru.

== Subspecies ==
A subspecies, Therinia amphira melini, was described by Felix Bryk in 1953.
