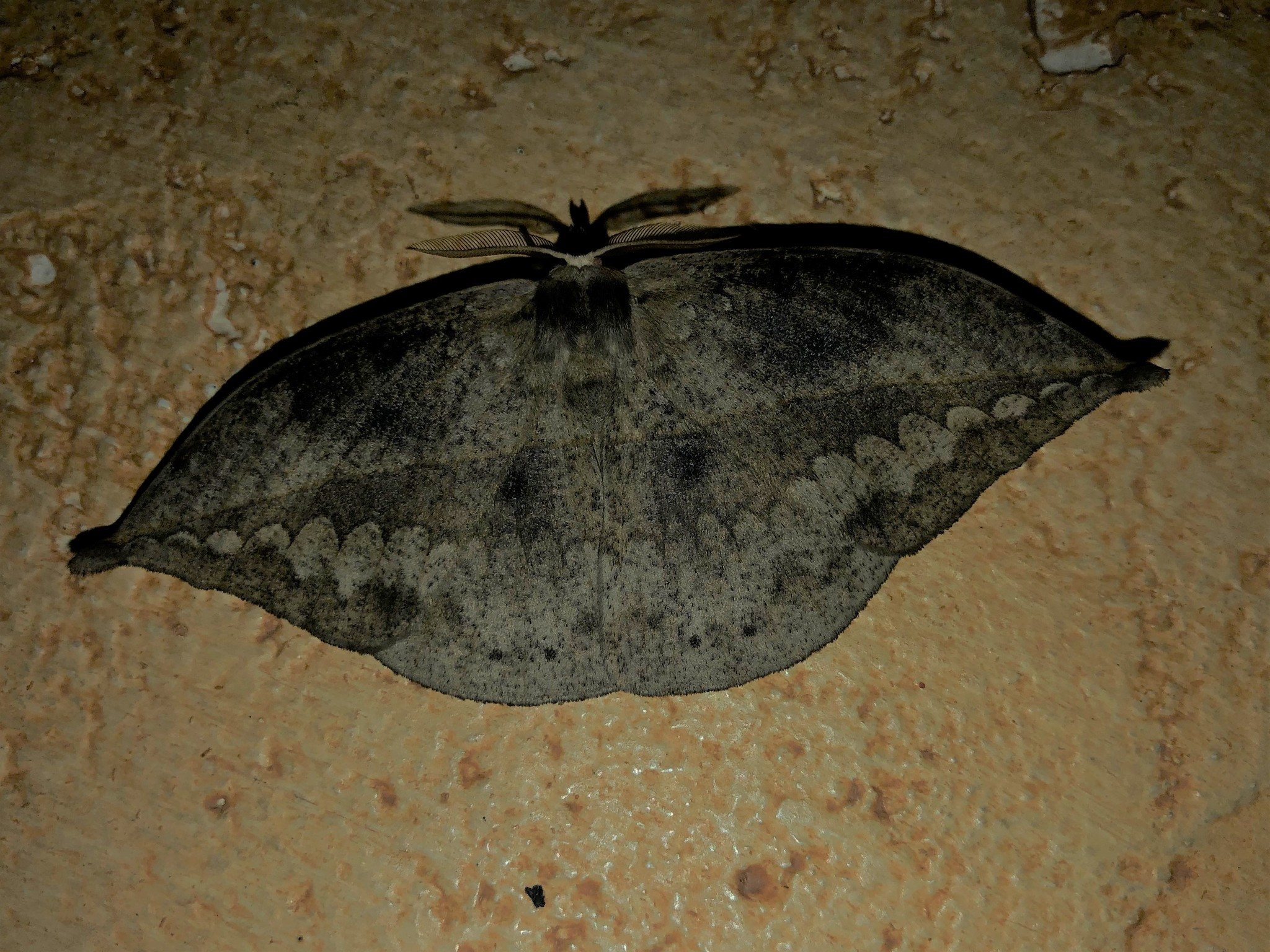
- Homoeopteryx malecena

Scientific classification
- Kingdom: Animalia
- Phylum: Arthropoda
- Clade: Pancrustacea
- Class: Insecta
- Order: Lepidoptera
- Family: Saturniidae
- Subfamily: Oxyteninae
- Genus: Homoeopteryx; Felder, 1874

= Homoeopteryx =

Genus of moths

Homoeopteryx is a genus of moths in the family Saturniidae first described by Felder in 1874.

== Species ==
- Homoeopteryx divisa Jordan, 1924
- Homoeopteryx elegans Jordan, 1924
- Homoeopteryx major Jordan, 1924
- Homoeopteryx malecena (Druce, 1886)
- Homoeopteryx syssauroides Felder, 1874
