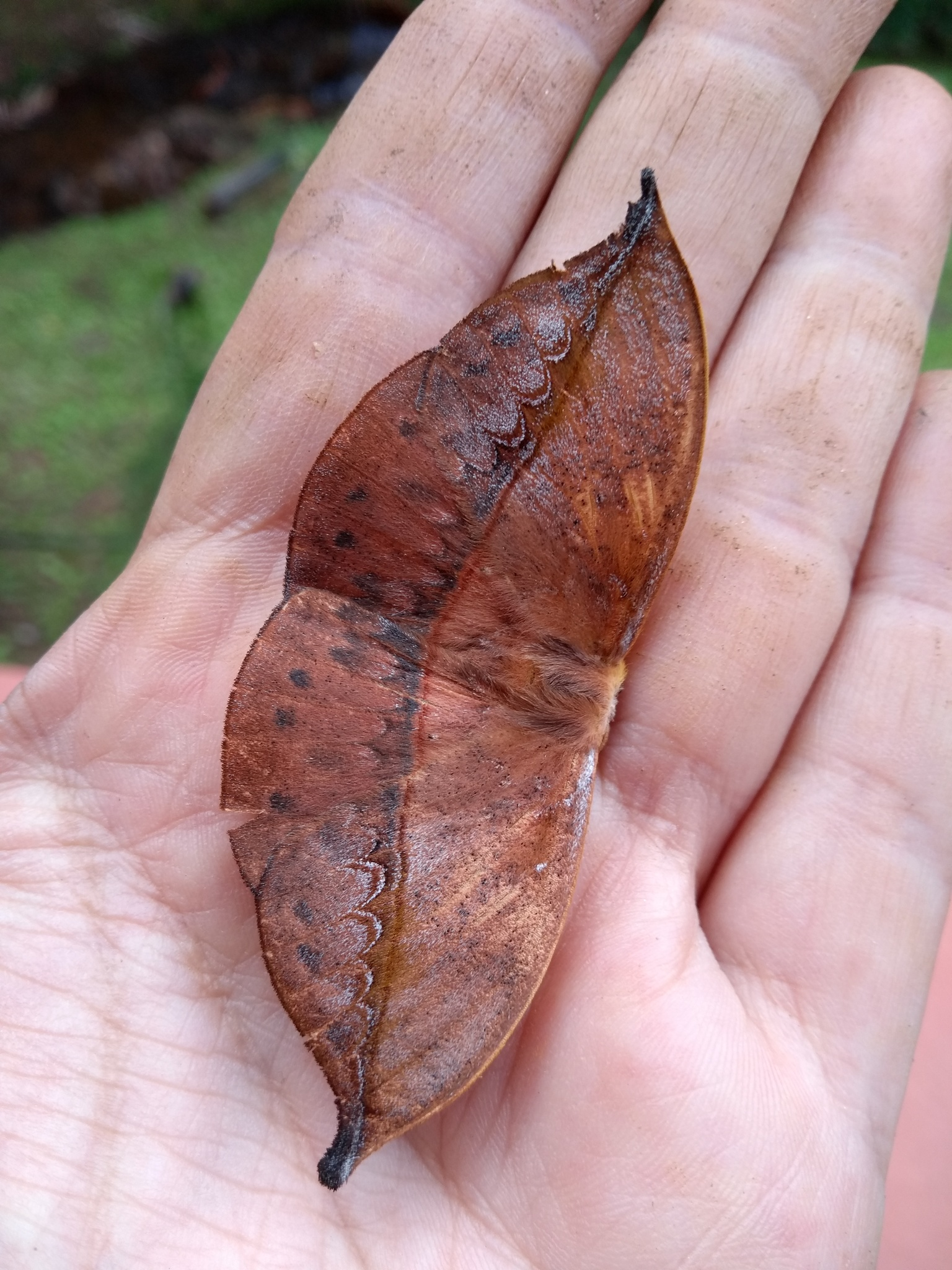
- Oxytenis modestia

Scientific classification
- Kingdom: Animalia
- Phylum: Arthropoda
- Clade: Pancrustacea
- Class: Insecta
- Order: Lepidoptera
- Family: Saturniidae
- Subfamily: Oxyteninae
- Genus: Oxytenis; Hübner, 1819

Synonyms
- Draconipteris Hübner, [1819]; Dracontopterus Agassiz, [1847]

= Oxytenis =

Genus of moths

Oxytenis is a genus of moths in the family Saturniidae and subfamily Oxyteninae. They are also known as jigsaw emperor moths. he genus was erected by Jacob Hübner in 1819. During its larval form, it has large eyespots on the front of its head in an attempt to mimic a snake. The larva has unusual, large, almost wing-like, fleshy protrusions on either side.

== Species ==
- Oxytenis albilunulata Schaus, 1912
- Oxytenis angulata (Cramer, 1775)
- Oxytenis aravaca Jordan, 1924
- Oxytenis beprea H. Druce, 1886
- Oxytenis bicornis Jordan, 1924
- Oxytenis epiphaea Jordan, 1924
- Oxytenis erosa Jordan, 1924
- Oxytenis ferruginea (Walker, 1855)
- Oxytenis gigantea (H. Druce, 1890)
- Oxytenis leda H. Druce, 1906
- Oxytenis mirabilis (Cramer, 1780)
- Oxytenis modestia (Cramer, 1780)
- Oxytenis naemia H. Druce, 1906
- Oxytenis nubila Jordan, 1924
- Oxytenis peregrina (Cramer, 1780)
- Oxytenis plettina Jordan, 1924
- Oxytenis sobrina Jordan, 1924
- Oxytenis spadix Jordan, 1924
- Oxytenis zerbina (Cramer, 1780)
