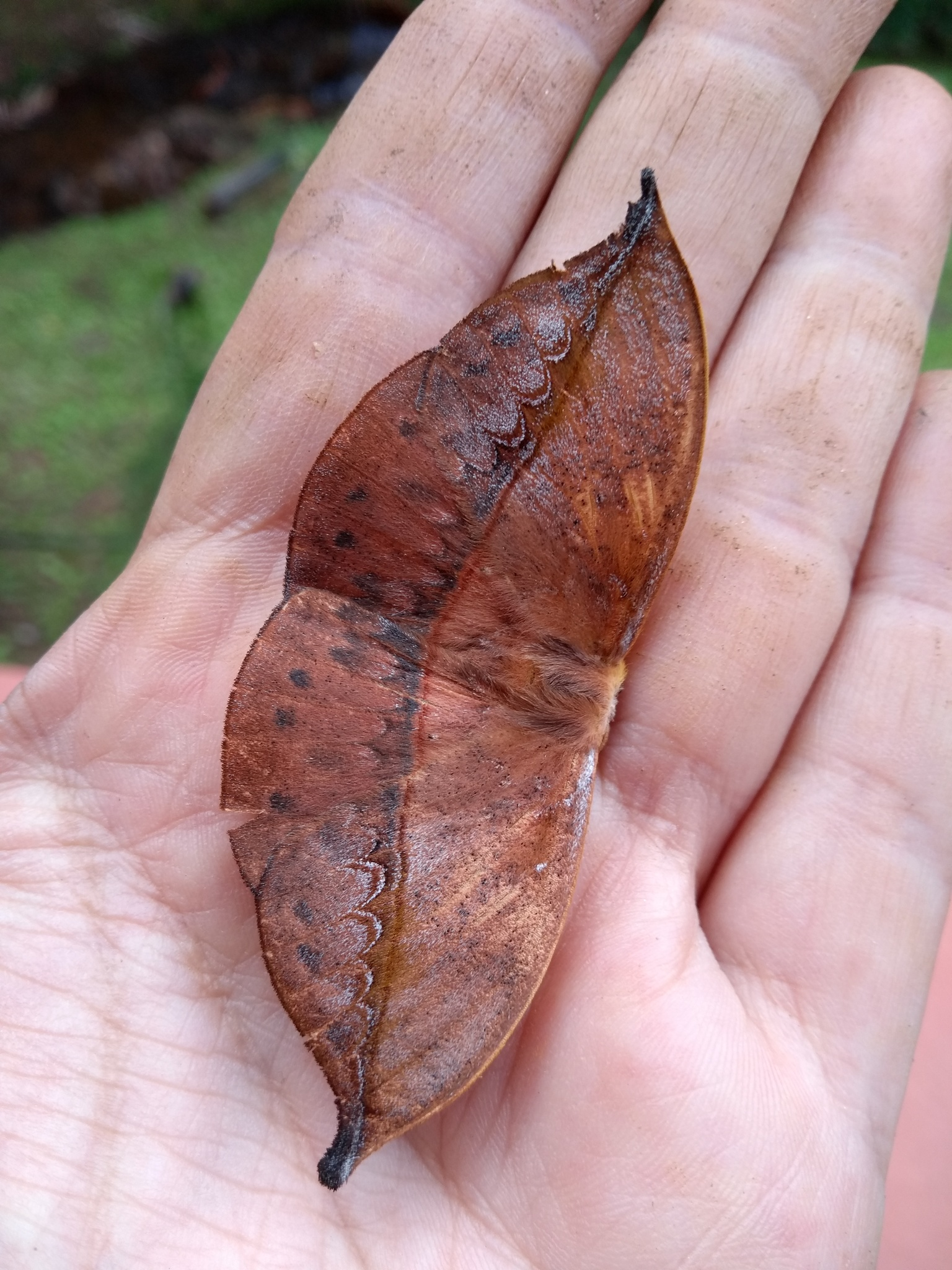

Scientific classification
- Kingdom: Animalia
- Phylum: Arthropoda
- Clade: Pancrustacea
- Class: Insecta
- Order: Lepidoptera
- Family: Saturniidae
- Genus: Oxytenis
- Species: O. modestia

Binomial name
- Oxytenis modestia (Cramer, 1780)

= Oxytenis modestia =

Species of moth

Oxytenis modestia, the Costa Rica leaf moth, dead-leaf moth, or tropical American silkworm moth, is a species of moth in the family Saturniidae. It was first described by Pieter Cramer in 1780. It occurs from Guatemala to northern South America.
