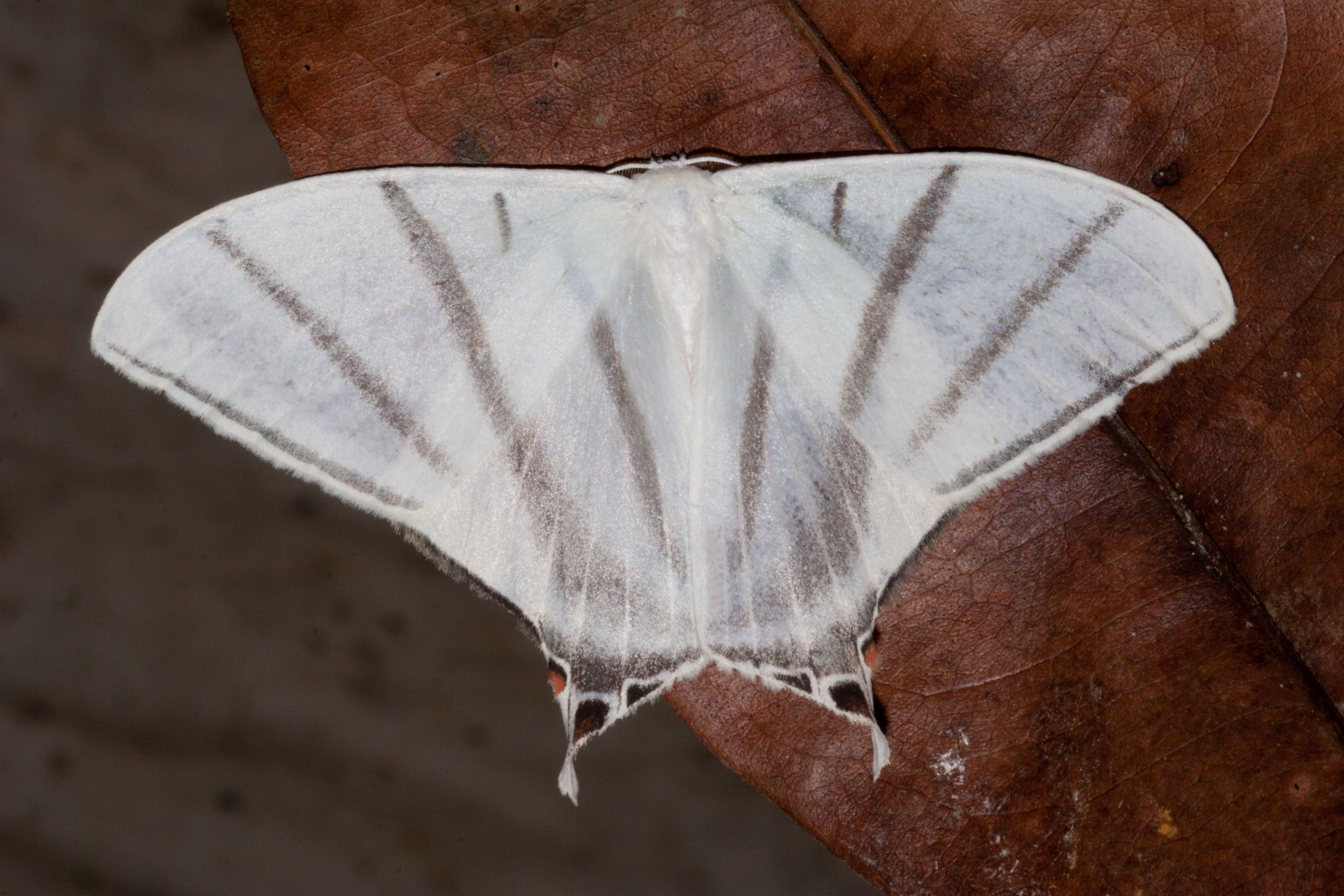

Scientific classification
- Kingdom: Animalia
- Phylum: Arthropoda
- Clade: Pancrustacea
- Class: Insecta
- Order: Lepidoptera
- Family: Saturniidae
- Genus: Therinia
- Species: T. transversaria

Binomial name
- Therinia transversaria Herbert Druce - 1887

= Therinia transversaria =

Species of moth

Therinia transversaria is a swallow-tailed moth in the family Saturniidae and the genus Therinia. It can be commonly mistaken for Urapteroides astheniata. It was discovered by Herbert Druce in 1887. It is also extremely similar to Therinia Terminalis, with the notable difference being a small orange patch on the rear wings.
