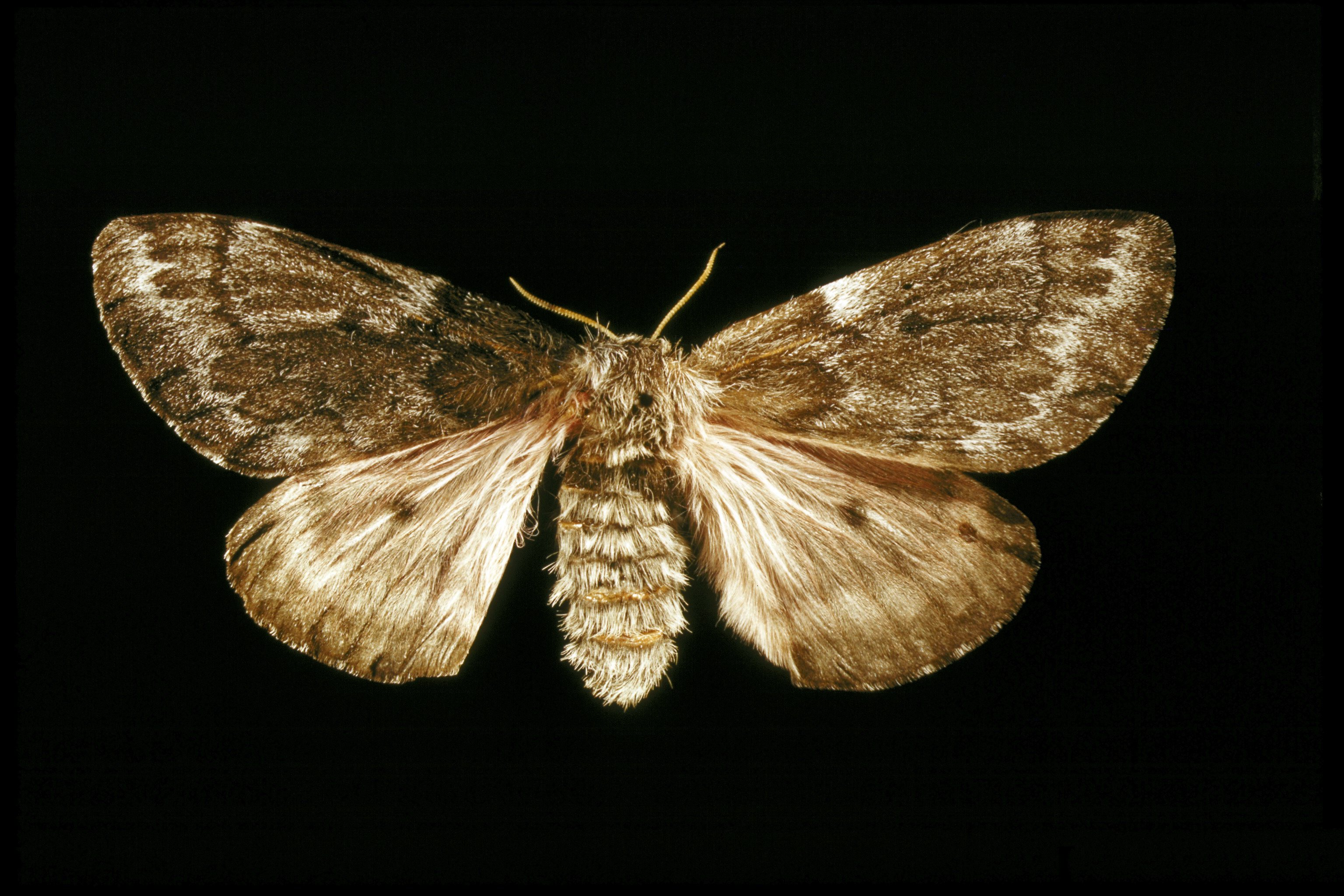
- Female
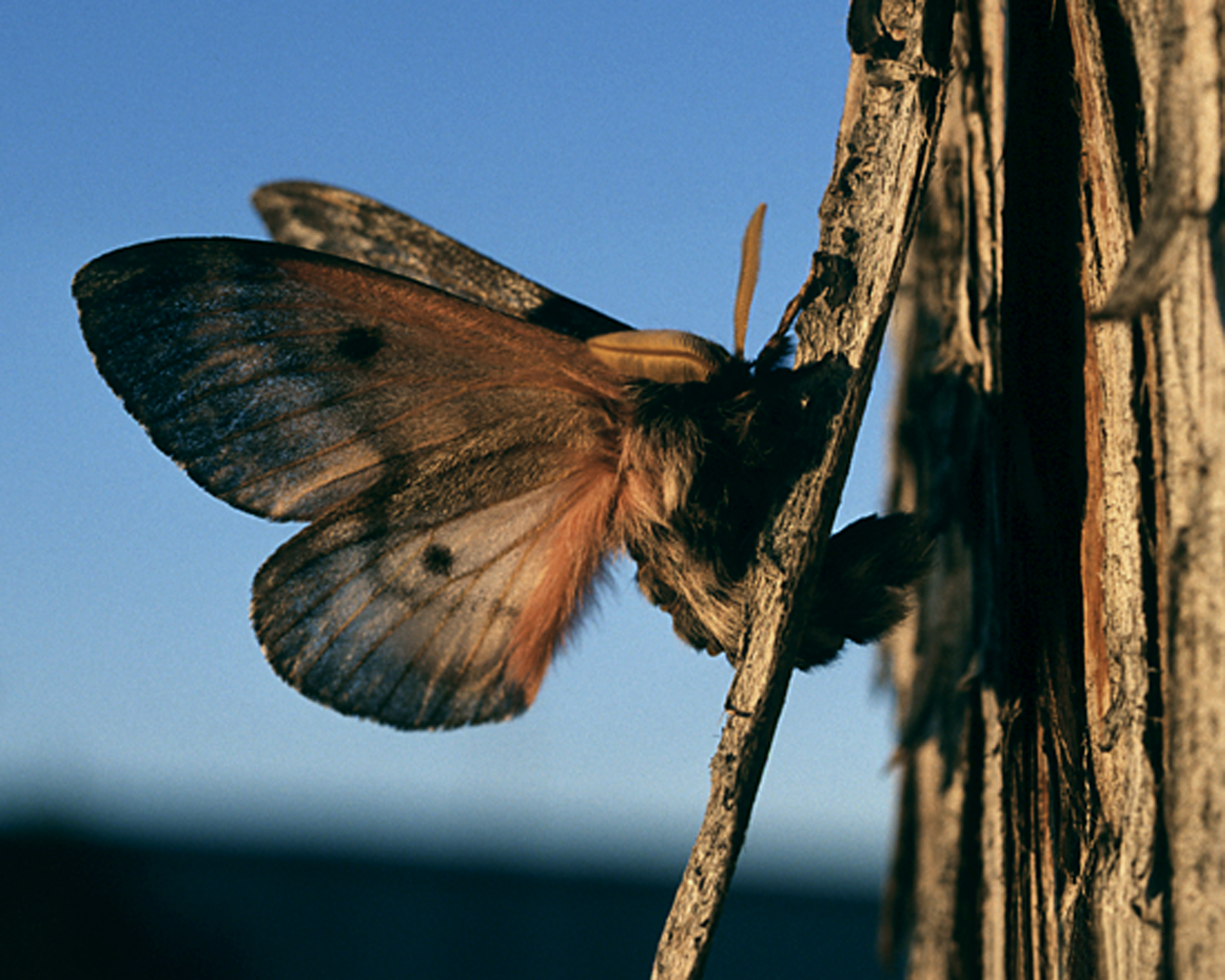
- Male

Scientific classification
- Domain: Eukaryota
- Kingdom: Animalia
- Phylum: Arthropoda
- Class: Insecta
- Order: Lepidoptera
- Family: Saturniidae
- Genus: Coloradia
- Species: C. pandora

Binomial name
- Coloradia pandora C. A. Blake, 1863

Synonyms
- Coloradia loiperda Dyar, 1912

= Pandora moth =

Species of moth

The Pandora moth or Pandora pinemoth (Coloradia pandora) is an insect belonging to the moth genus Coloradia. The species was first described by C. A. Blake in 1863. It is native to the western United States. The larvae of the Pandora moth feed on the foliage of several species of pine trees, including the lodgepole, Jeffrey, and ponderosa pines. The larvae populations sometimes reach high enough levels to cause severe defoliation; such outbreaks have occurred in northern Arizona, central Oregon, and southern California. The Paiute people in California's Owens Valley and Mono Lake areas harvest, prepare, and store the larvae (which they call piuga) as a preferred food. This has brought the natives into conflict with the United States Forest Service, which has sought to control moth populations through the use of insecticides.

== Life cycle ==
Pandora moths are semivoltine, producing one new generation every two years. Around the end of June, the adult moths appear; they lay eggs which hatch in August. Over the winter, the larvae remain on the tree, feeding on its foliage. The following summer, the insects drop off the trees and pupate, burying themselves in the ground, where they will remain for a year (or, in some areas, 2–4 years), until they emerge as adult moths.

== Human use ==
The Paiutes (Nüümü) of California's Owens Valley (Payahuunadü) and Mono Lake (Kootza Paatsehota) harvest, prepare, store, and eat the larvae of the Pandora moth, which they call piuga or piagü. The larvae are collected at their most mature stage, during their July or early-August migration to the forest floor at the end of their first year of life. They are gathered by hand once or twice a day, and temporarily stored in trenches in the ground. The larvae are then roasted in fire-heated sand for half-an-hour to an hour; the sand not only cooks the insects but also serves to remove the urticating fine hairs, the setae, from their bodies.

The cooked larvae are washed, sorted, and dried. Stored in a cool and dry place, they keep for at least a year and perhaps as long as two. The dried piuga are reconstituted before consumption by boiling for about an hour in plain or salted water. The boiled insects have an odor described as like that of cooked mushrooms. They are eaten as a finger food; the entire larva is eaten except for the head. The cooking water is also consumed as broth, or used as a base for a piuga-and-vegetable stew.

== Gallery ==
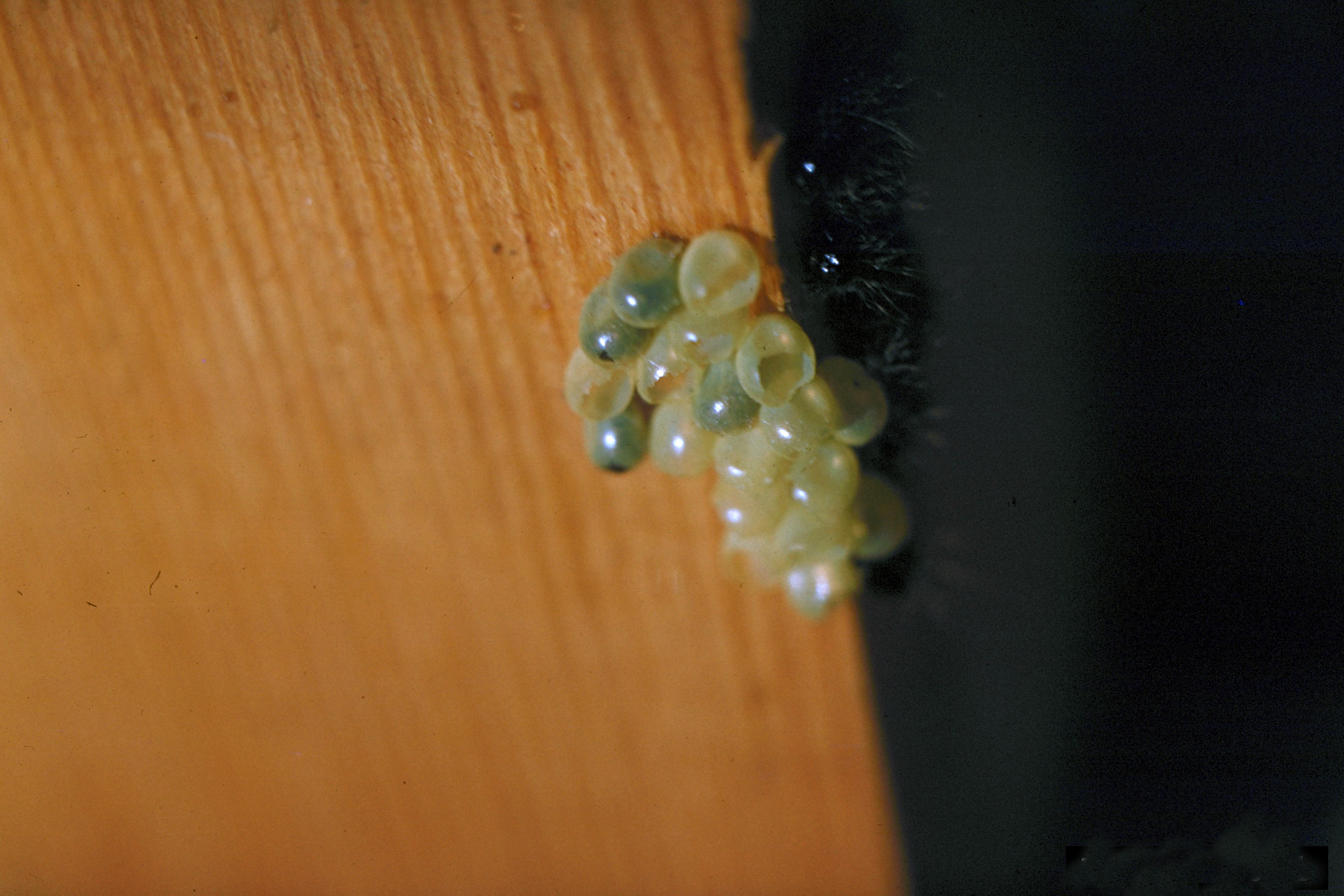
Eggs

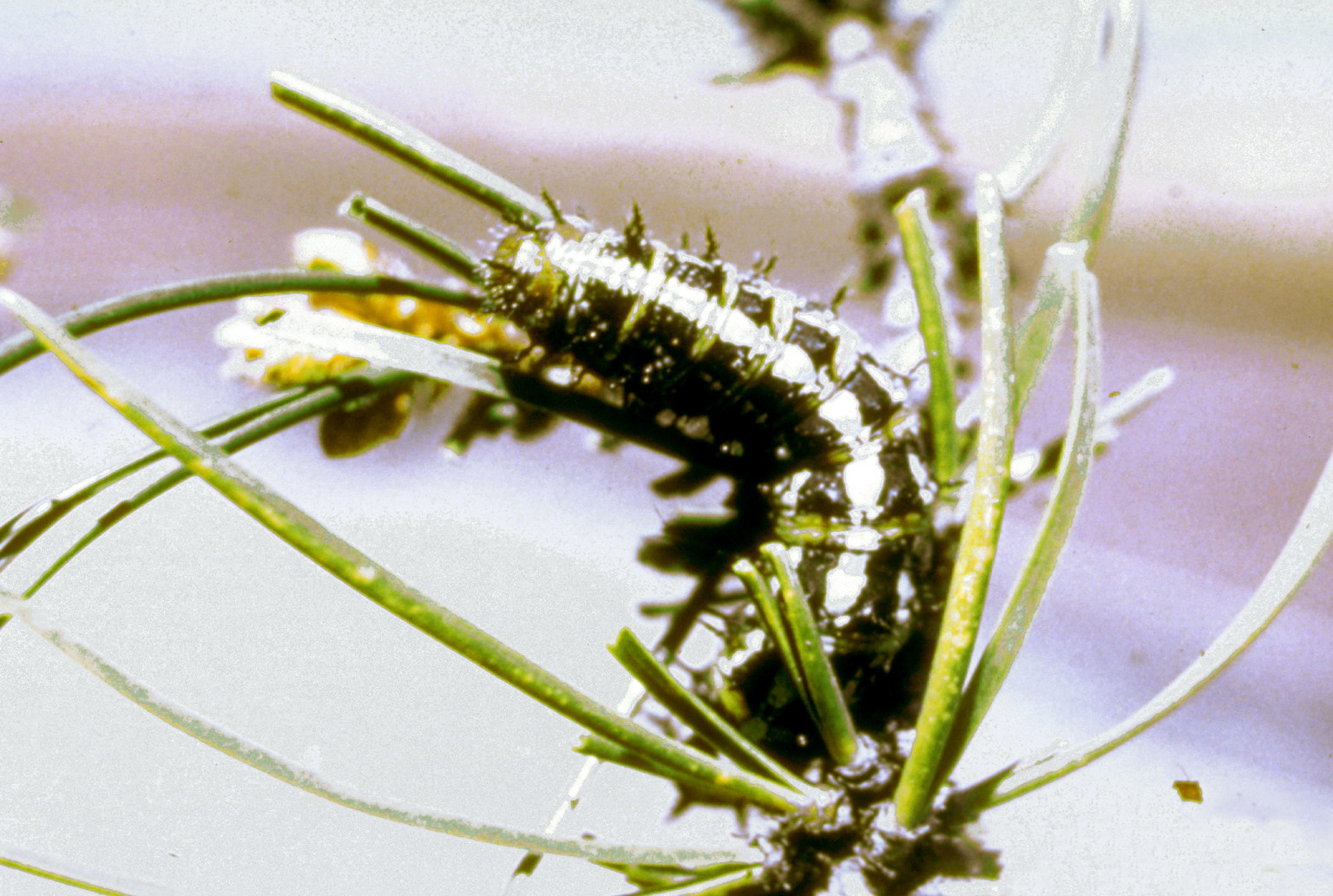
Larva

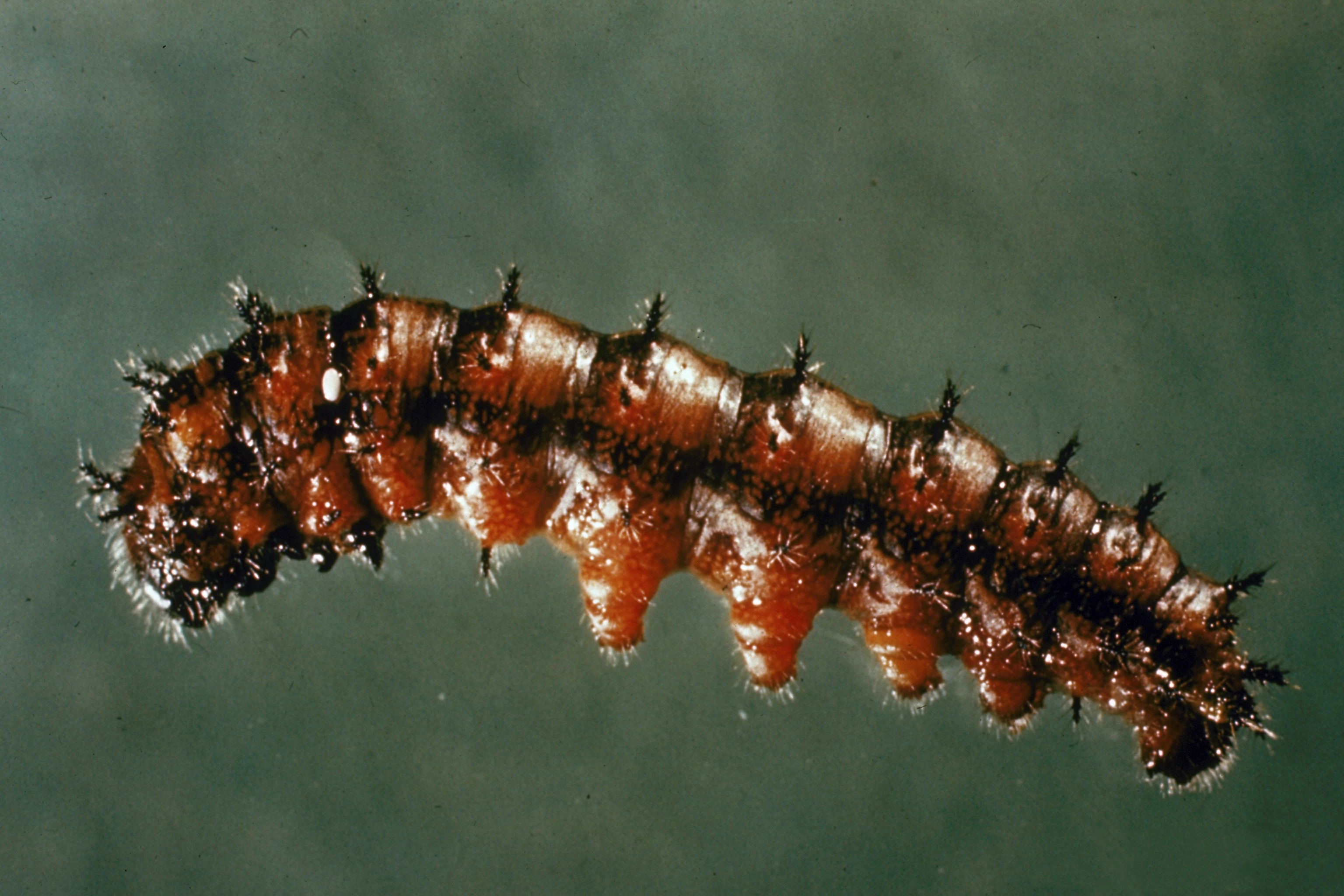
Larva

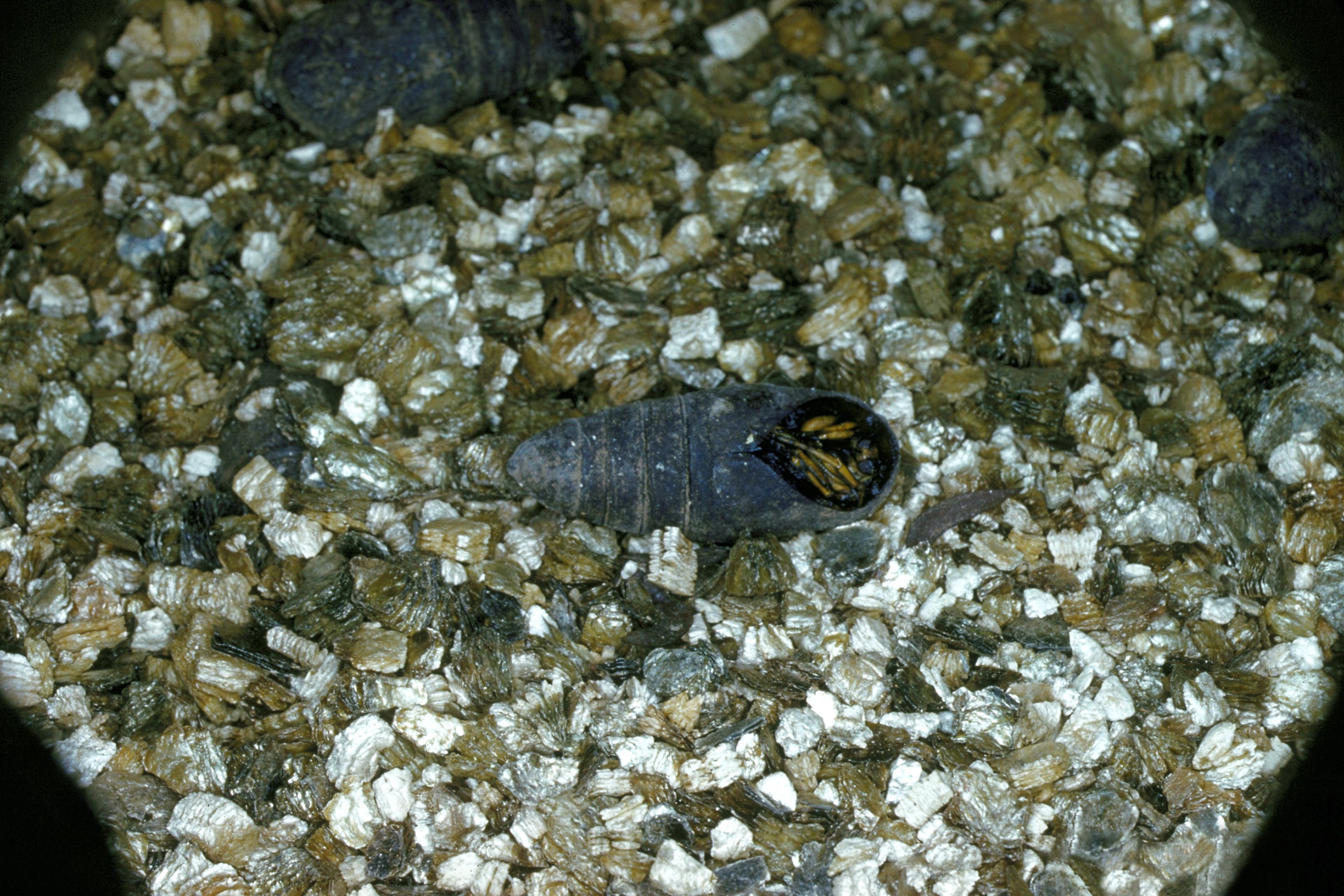
Pupa

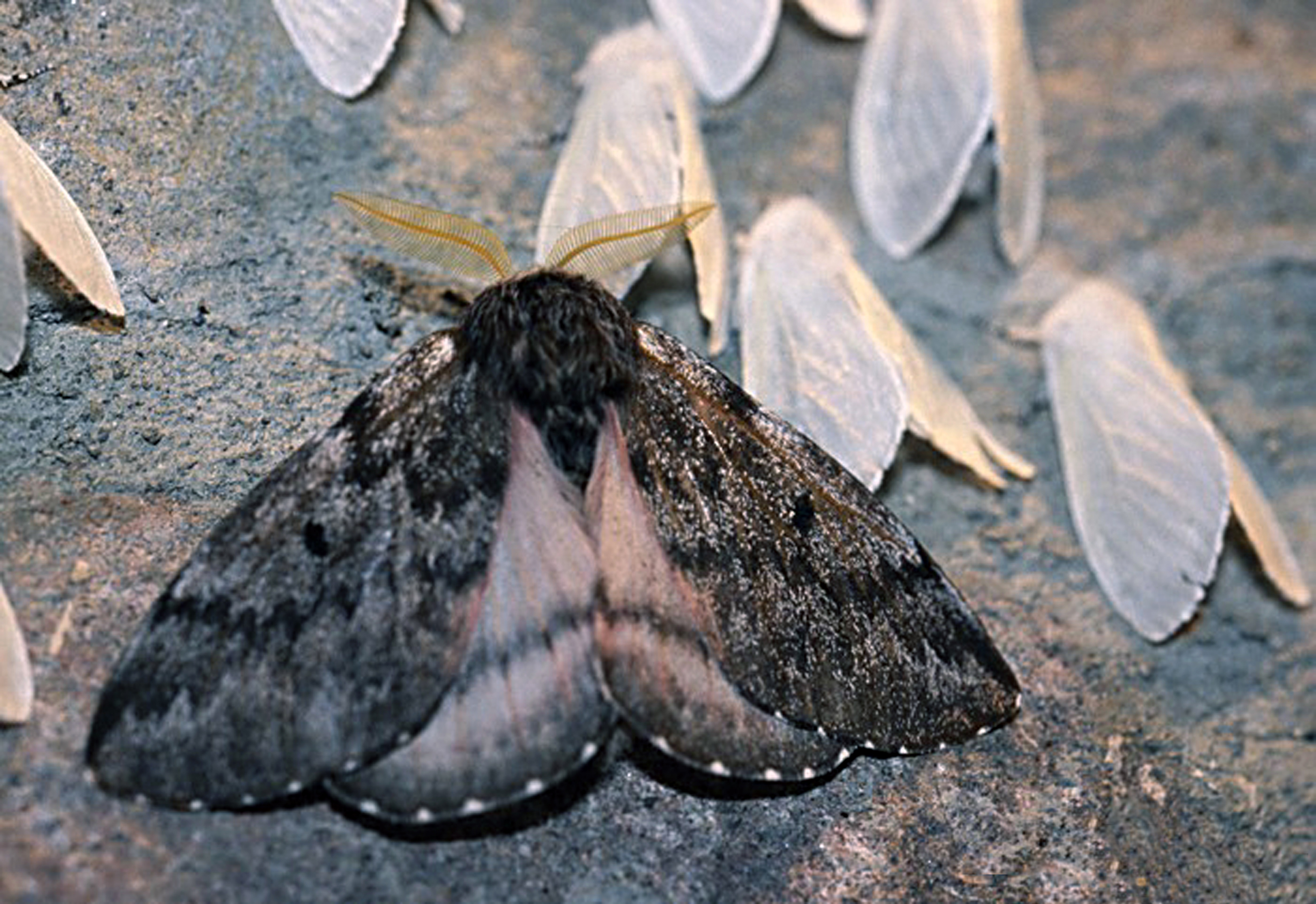
Adult

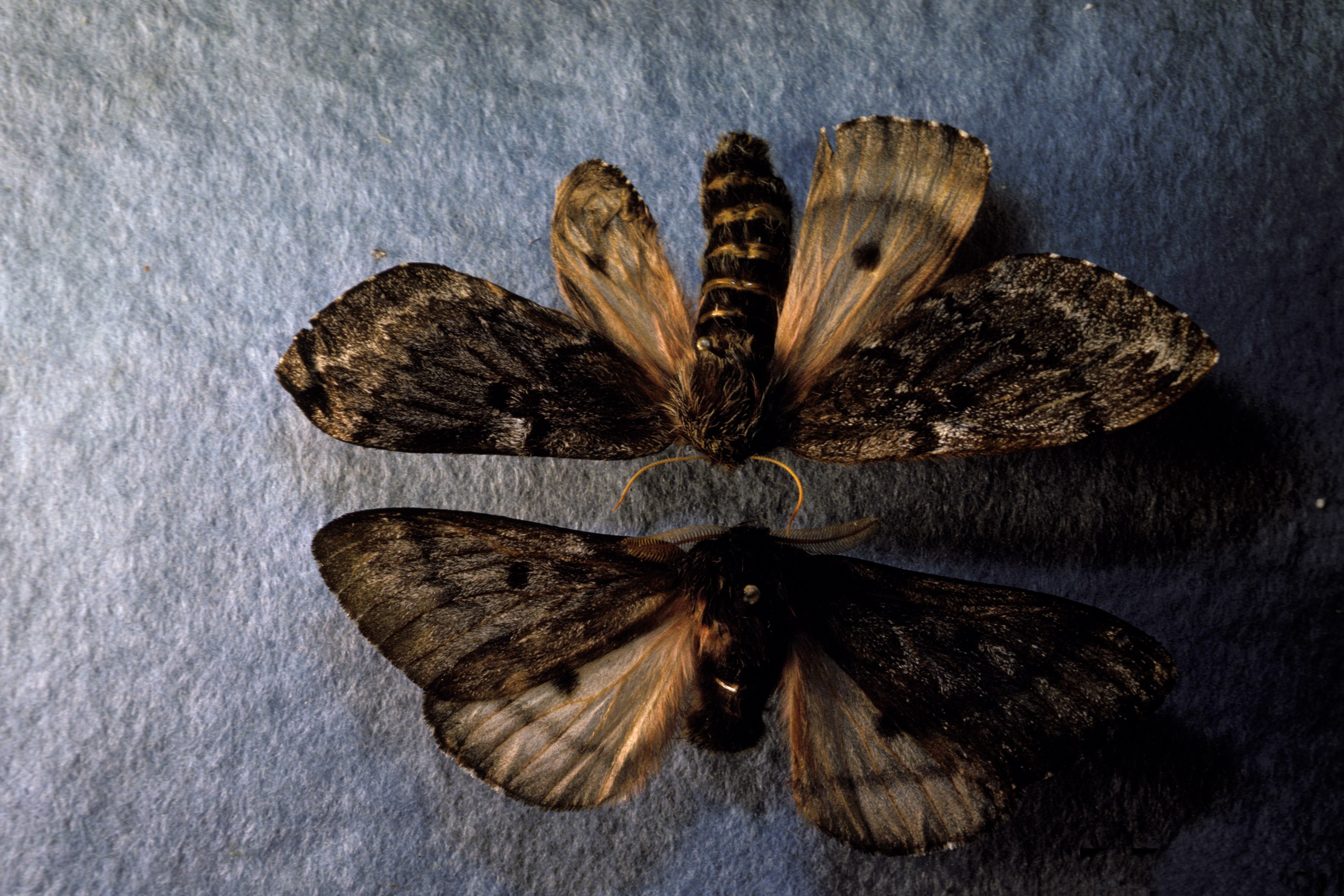
Adult female (top) and male (bottom)
