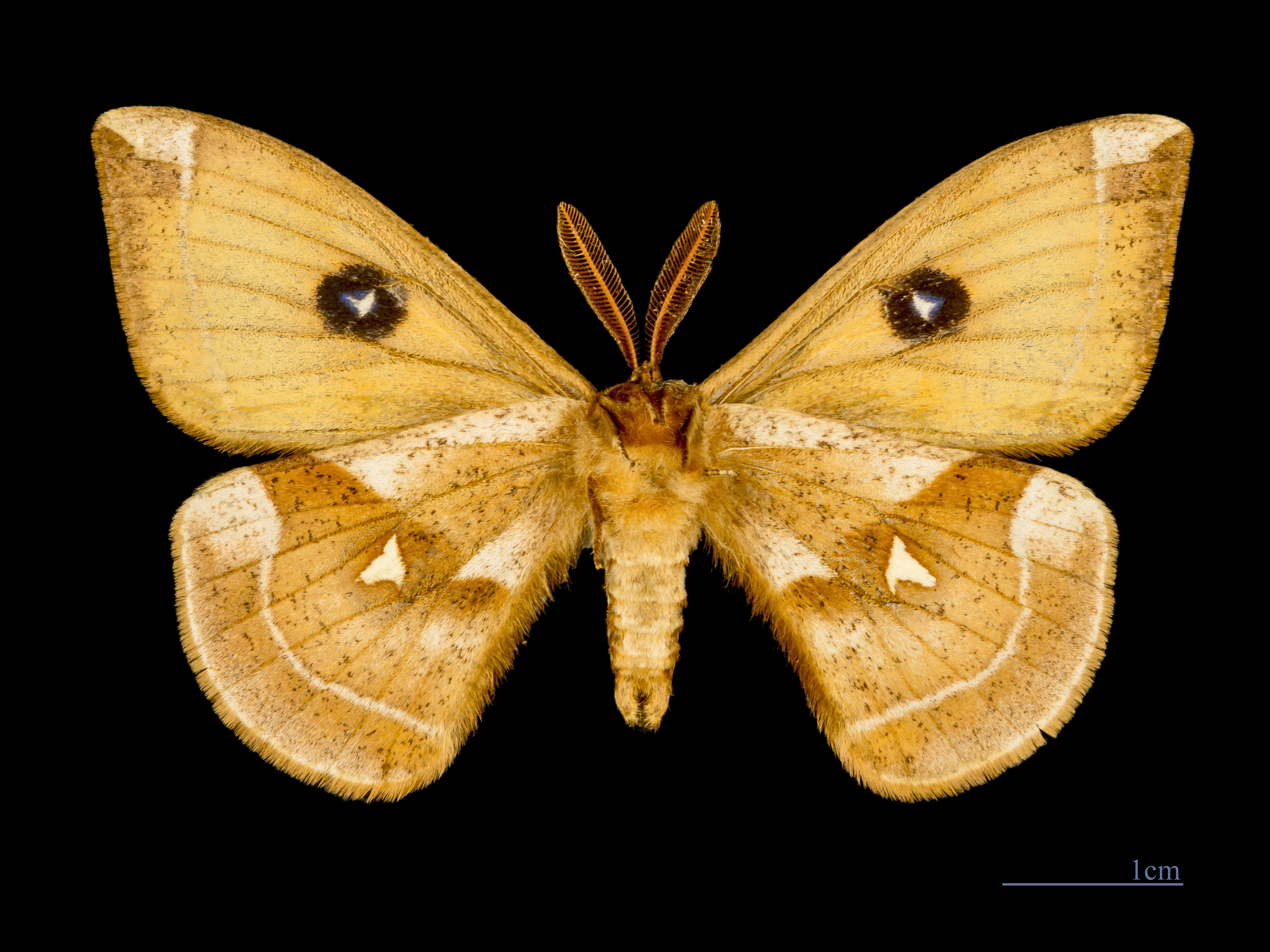
- Aglia tau

Scientific classification
- Domain: Eukaryota
- Kingdom: Animalia
- Phylum: Arthropoda
- Class: Insecta
- Order: Lepidoptera
- Family: Saturniidae
- Genus: Aglia; Ochsenheimer, 1810

= Aglia =

Genus of moths

Aglia is a genus of moths in the family Saturniidae first described by Ochsenheimer in 1810. It is the only genus in the subfamily Agliinae. They don't spin a cocoon.

== Species ==
- Aglia tau (Linnaeus, 1758)
- Aglia ingens Naumann, 2003
- Aglia japonica Leech, 1889
- Aglia homora Jordan (in Seitz), 1911
- Aglia sinjaevi Brechlin, 2015
- Aglia spaniolissima Gómez-Bustillo, 1980
- Aglia vanschaycki Brechlin, 2015
