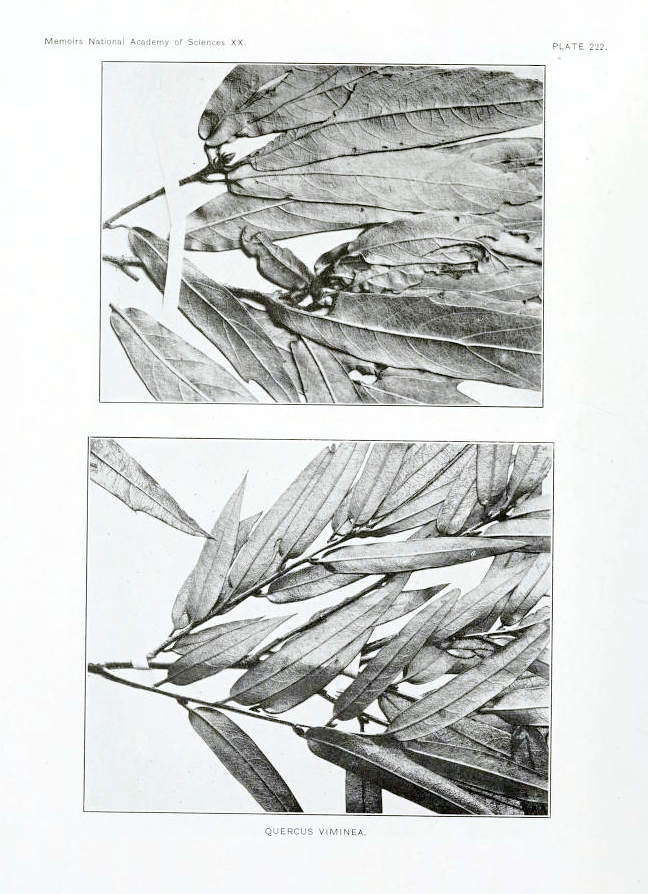

Conservation status
- Least Concern (IUCN 3.1)

Scientific classification
- Kingdom: Plantae
- Clade: Embryophytes
- Clade: Tracheophytes
- Clade: Spermatophytes
- Clade: Angiosperms
- Clade: Eudicots
- Clade: Rosids
- Order: Fagales
- Family: Fagaceae
- Genus: Quercus
- Subgenus: Quercus subg. Quercus
- Section: Quercus sect. Lobatae
- Species: Q. viminea

Binomial name
- Quercus viminea Trel.

Synonyms
- Quercus bolanyosensis Trel.

= Quercus viminea =

Species of oak tree

Quercus viminea, the Sonoran oak, or Mexican willow oak, is a North American species of oak. It is native to northwestern and west-central Mexico (Sonora, Chihuahua, Sinaloa, Durango, Nayarit, Jalisco), primarily in the Sierra Madre Occidental. The species range extends just north of the international border into Santa Cruz County in southern Arizona.

Quercus viminea is an evergreen or drought-deciduous tree growing up to 10 metres (33 feet) tall. The leaves are narrowly lance-shaped, up to 15 centimetres (6 inches) long.
