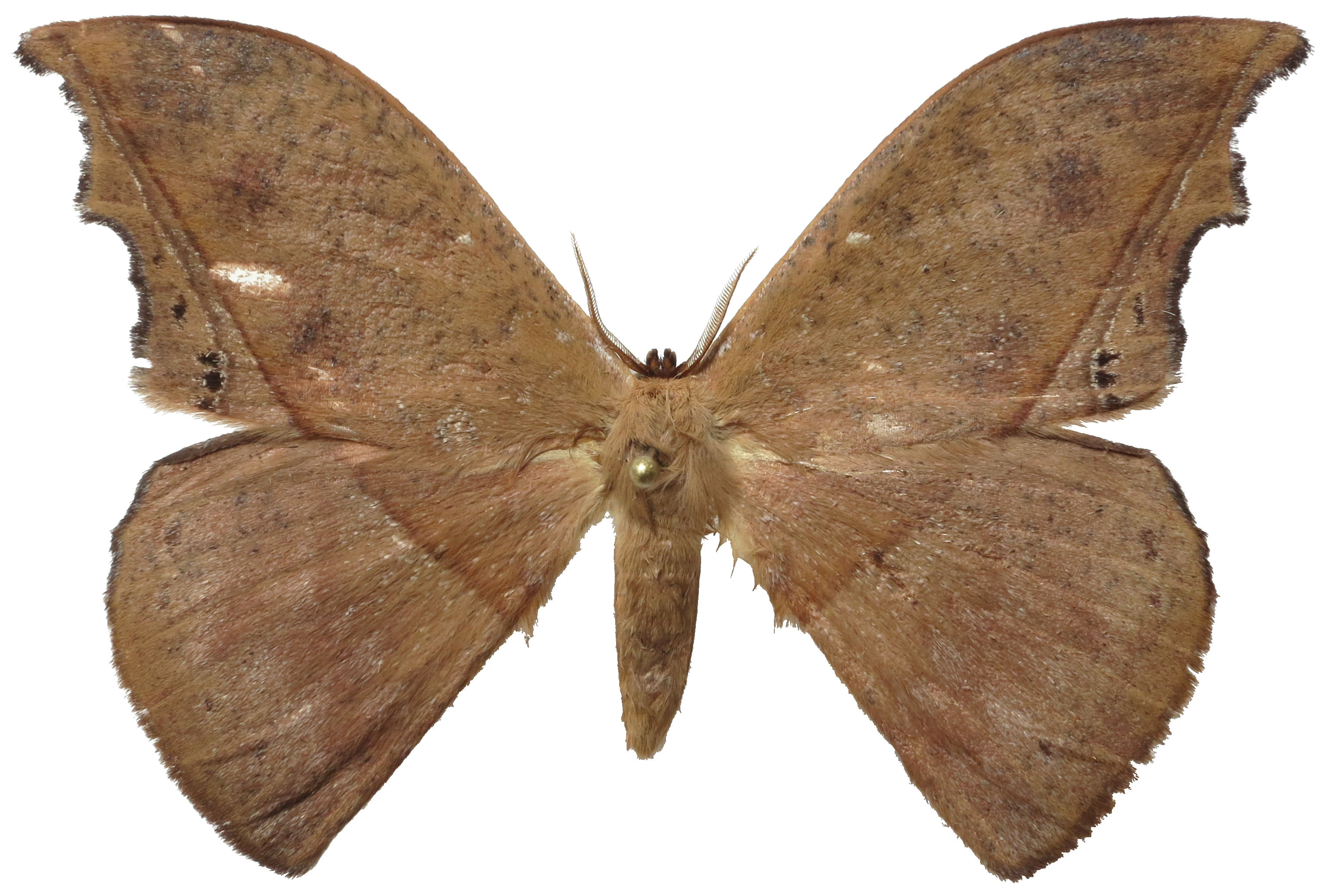
- Oxytenis mirabilis

Scientific classification
- Domain: Eukaryota
- Kingdom: Animalia
- Phylum: Arthropoda
- Class: Insecta
- Order: Lepidoptera
- Family: Saturniidae
- Subfamily: Oxyteninae

Genera
- See text

= Oxyteninae =

Subfamily of moths

Oxyteninae is a subfamily of the family Saturniidae, until recently classified as a separate family, Oxytenidae. Its members are mostly from Central and South America.

== Genera ==
This subfamily contains the following genera:

- Oxytenis
- Homoeopteryx
- Therinia

Syns:

- Asthenidia
- Eusyssaura
- Lycabis
- Teratopteris
