= Hemileuca oliviae =

- In Colorado, U.S.

Scientific classification
- Kingdom: Animalia
- Phylum: Arthropoda
- Clade: Pancrustacea
- Class: Insecta
- Order: Lepidoptera
- Family: Saturniidae
- Subfamily: Hemileucinae
- Genus: Hemileuca
- Species: H. oliviae

Binomial name
- Hemileuca oliviae Cockerell, 1898

Species of moth

Hemileuca oliviae, the range caterpillar, is a species of insect in the moth family Saturniidae. It is found in Central America and North America.
