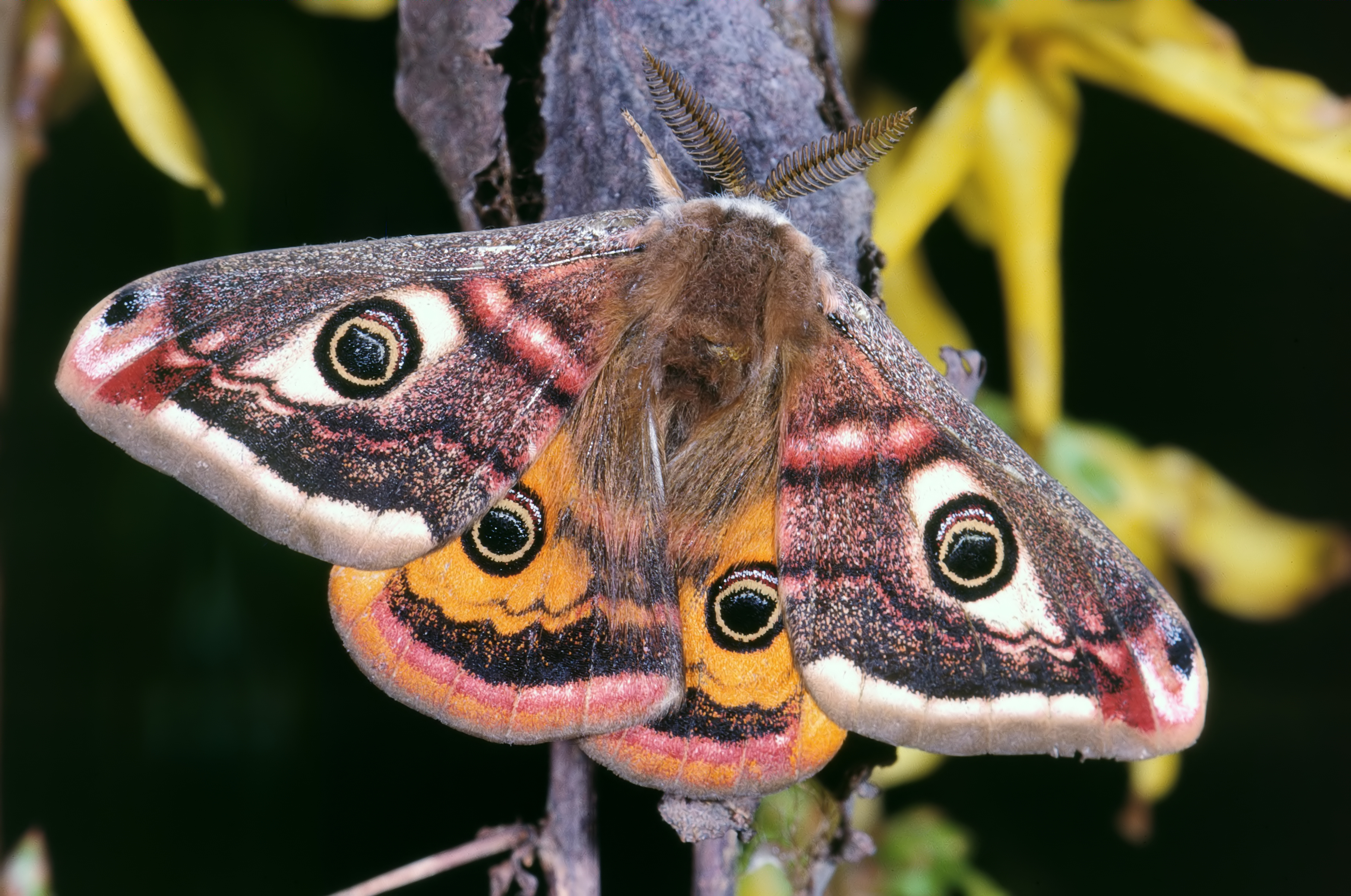
- Male small emperor moth, Saturnia pavonia (Saturniinae)

Scientific classification
- Kingdom: Animalia
- Phylum: Arthropoda
- Clade: Pancrustacea
- Class: Insecta
- Order: Lepidoptera
- Superfamily: Bombycoidea
- Family: Saturniidae

Subfamilies
- Oxyteninae; Cercophaninae; Arsenurinae; Ceratocampinae; Hemileucinae; Agliinae; Ludiinae (disputed); Salassinae; Saturniinae

= Saturniidae =

Family of moths

Saturniidae, members of which are commonly named the saturniids, is a family of Lepidoptera with an estimated 2,300 described species. The family contains some of the largest species of moths in the world. Notable members include the emperor moths, royal moths, and giant silk moths (or wild silk moths).

Adults are characterized by large, lobed wings, heavy bodies covered in hair-like scales, and reduced mouthparts. They lack a frenulum, but the hindwings overlap the forewings to produce the effect of an unbroken wing surface. Saturniids are sometimes brightly colored and often have translucent eyespots or "windows" on their wings. Sexual dimorphism varies by species, but males can generally be distinguished by their larger, broader antennae.

Most adults have wingspans between 1–6 in (2.5–15.2 cm), but some tropical species such as the Atlas moth (Attacus atlas) may have wingspans up to 12 in (30 cm). Together with certain Noctuidae, Saturniidae contains the largest Lepidoptera and some of the largest extant insects.

== Distribution ==
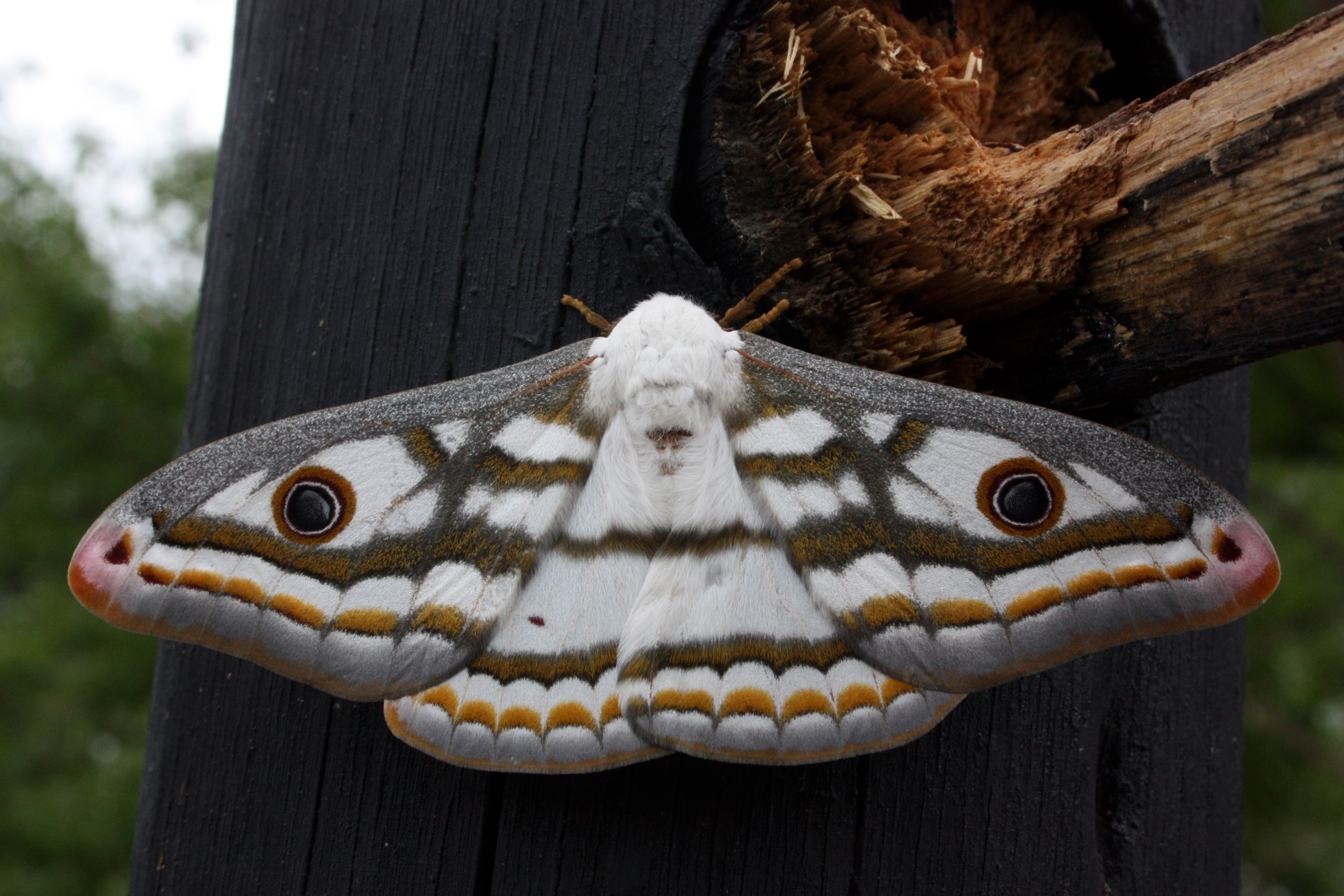
Marbled emperor moth (Heniocha dyops) in Botswana

The majority of saturniid species occur in wooded tropical or subtropical regions, with the greatest diversity in the New World tropics and Mexico, though they are found all over the world. About 12 described species live in Europe, one of which, the emperor moth, occurs in the British Isles, and 68 described species live in North America, 42 of which reside north of Mexico and Southern California.

== Life cycle ==
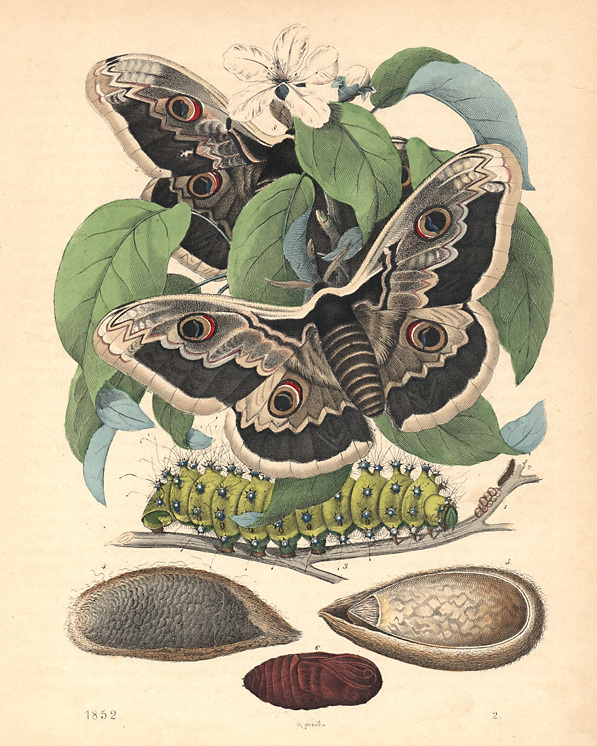
Life stages of giant emperor moth (Saturnia pyri)

Some saturniids are strictly univoltine, producing only one generation a year, whereas others are multivoltine, producing more than one brood a year. Spring and summer broods eclose in a matter of weeks; autumn broods enter a state known as diapause and emerge the following spring. How the pupae know when to eclose early or hibernate is not yet fully understood, though research suggests day length during the fifth larval instar plays a major role, as well as cooling temperatures. Longer days may prompt pupae to develop early, while shorter days result in pupal diapause. The number of broods is flexible, and a single female may produce both fast-developing and slow-developing individuals, or they may produce different numbers of broods in different years or parts of the range. In some species, the spring and summer broods look different from each other; for example, the two Saturniinae species Actias luna (the luna moth) and Callosamia securifera both have certain genes which may or may not be activated depending upon differences in environmental conditions.

=== Eggs ===
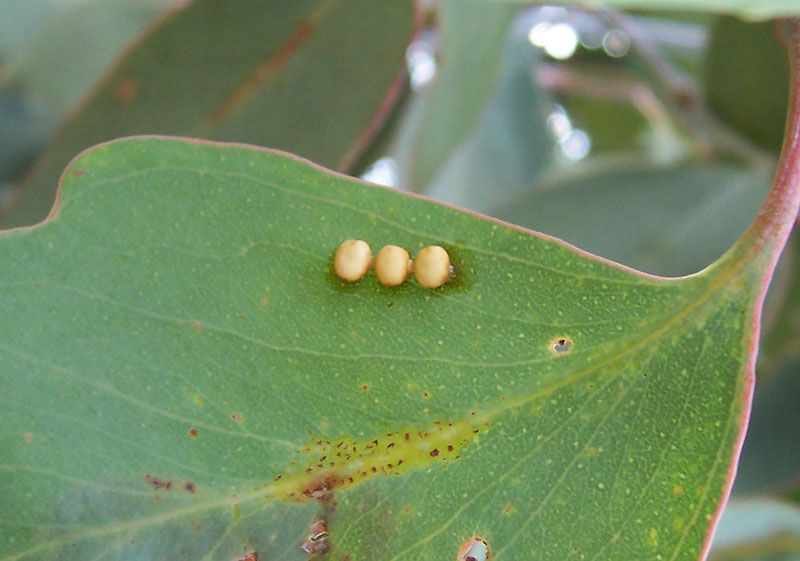
Clutch of emperor gum moth (Opodiphthera eucalypti) eggs

Depending on the moth, a single female may lay up to 200 eggs on a chosen host plant. Others are laid singly or in small groups. They are round, slightly flattened, smooth, and translucent or whitish.

=== Larvae ===
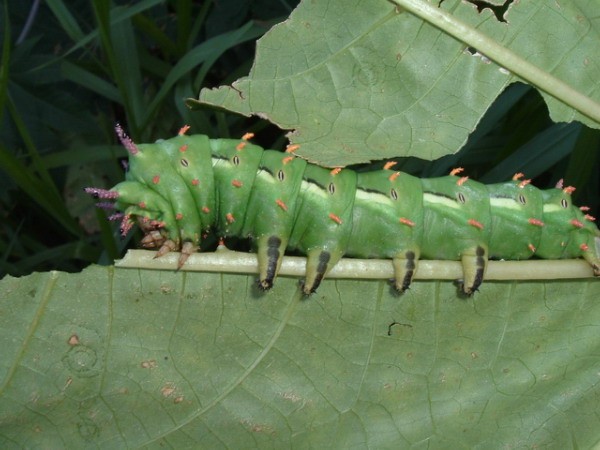
Citheronia laocoon fifth-instar caterpillar in Brazil

Saturniid caterpillars are large (50 to 100 mm (2.0 to 3.9 in) in the final instar), stout, and cylindrical. Most have tubercules that are often also spiny or hairy. Many are cryptic in coloration, with countershading or disruptive coloration to reduce detection, but some are more colorful. Some have urticating hairs. A few species have been noted to produce clicking sounds with the larval mandibles when disturbed. Examples: luna moth (Actias luna) and Polyphemus moth (Antheraea polyphemus). The clicks may serve as aposematic warning signals to a regurgitation defense.

Most are solitary feeders, but some are gregarious. The Hemileucinae are gregarious when young and have stinging hairs, and those of Lonomia contain a poison that may kill a human. Arsenura armida is another well-known example and is infamous for its large conspicuous masses during the day. Their coloration is not cryptic, instead exhibiting aposematism.

The other caterpillars in this size range are almost universally Sphingidae, which are seldom hairy and tend to have diagonal stripes on their sides. Many Sphingidae caterpillars bear a single curved horn on their hind end. These are actually not dangerous, but large, hairy caterpillars should generally not be touched except by experts.

Most saturniid larvae feed on the foliage of trees and shrubs. A few, particularly Hemileucinae such as Automeris louisiana, A. patagonensis, and Hemileuca oliviae, feed on grasses. They moult at regular intervals, usually four to six times before entering the pupal stage. Prior to pupation, a wandering stage occurs, and the caterpillar may change color, becoming more cryptic just before this stage.

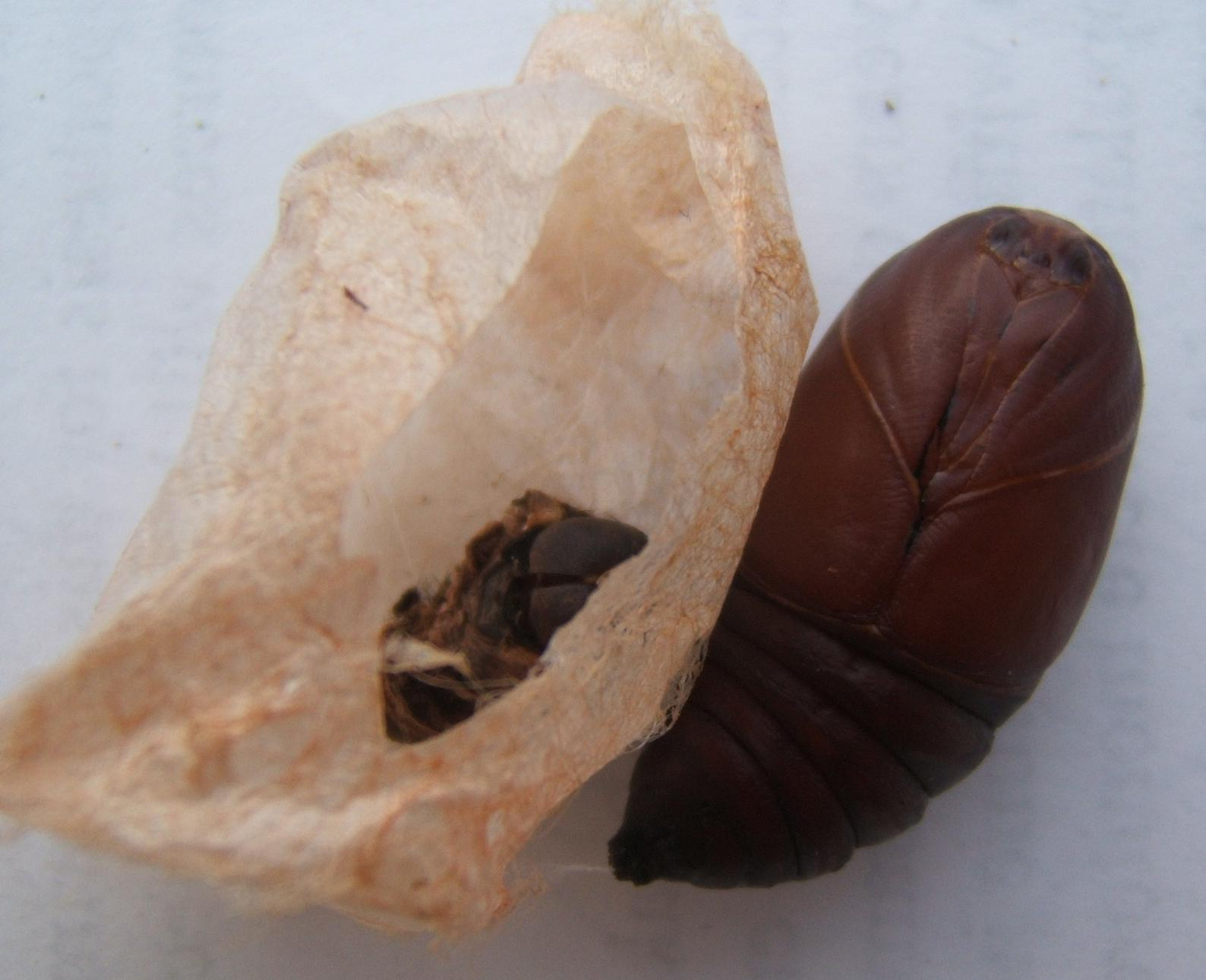
Luna moth (Actias luna, Saturniinae) pupa (right) removed from cocoon (left, note last larval skin)

=== Pupae ===
Most larvae spin a silken cocoon in the leaves of a preferred host plant or in leaf litter on the ground, or crevices in rocks and logs. While only moderately close relatives to the silkworm (Bombyx mori) among the Lepidoptera, the cocoons of larger saturniids can be gathered and used to make silk fabric. However, larvae of some species – typically Ceratocampinae, like the regal moth (Citheronia regalis) and the imperial moth (Eacles imperialis), burrow and pupate in a small chamber beneath the soil. This is common in the Ceratocampinae and Hemileucinae. Unlike most silk moths, those that pupate underground do not use much silk in the construction. Once enclosed in the cocoon, the caterpillar sheds the larval skin and becomes a pupa, and the pupa undergoes metamorphosis for about 14 days, at which point it either emerges or goes into diapause. During metamorphosis, the respiratory system will stay intact, the digestive system will dissolve, and reproductive organs will take form.

=== Adults ===
Adult females emerge with a complete set of mature ova and "call" males by emitting pheromones (specific "calling" times vary by species). Males can detect these chemical signals up to a mile away with help from sensitive receptors located on the tips of their feather-like antennae. The males fly several miles in one night to locate a female and mate with her; females generally will not fly until after they have mated.

Since the mouthparts of adult saturniids are vestigial and digestive tracts are absent, adults subsist on stored lipids acquired during the larval stage. As such, adult behavior is devoted almost entirely to reproduction, but the end result (due to lack of feeding) is a lifespan of a week or less once emerged from the pupa.

One specific species in the family Saturniidae with a special mating pattern is Callosamia promethea (promethea silkmoth). Females will mate with multiple males and males will mate with multiple females (polygynandry). Females that mate with more than one male will produce 10% more eggs.

== Importance to humans ==
Typical example of Saturniidae camouflage, Eacles imperialis (imperial moth), next to a nearly identical yellow poplar (Liriodendron tulipifera) leaf

A few species are important defoliator pests, including the orange-striped oakworm moth (Anisota senatoria) on oaks, the pandora pinemoth (Coloradia pandora) on pines and Hemileuca oliviae on range grasses.

Other species are of major commercial importance in tussah and wild silk production. These notably include the Chinese tussah moth (Antheraea pernyi), its hybridogenic descendant Antheraea × proylei, and the ailanthus silkmoth (Samia cynthia). Mopane worm (Gonimbrasia belina), Gonimbrasia zambesina, the cabbage tree emperor moth (Bunaea alcinoe), Gynanisa maia, Imbrasia epimethea, Imbrasia oyemensis, Melanocera menippe, Microgone cana, Urota sinope and the pallid emperor moth (Cirina forda).

Some species of Saturniidae such as the mopane worm (Gonimbrasia belina) are used as a food source.

Most Saturniidae are harmless animals at least as adults, and in many cases at all stages of their lives. Thus, some of the more spectacular species – in particular Antheraea – can be raised by children or school classes as educational pets. The soft, silken cocoons make an interesting keepsake for pupils.

Some, including the genus Automeris, have urticating spines that sting.

Caterpillars of the genus Lonomia produce a deadly toxin injected into the victim when it is touched.

== Systematics and evolution ==
In terms of absolute numbers of species, the Saturniidae are most diverse in the Neotropics. Also, their most ancient subfamilies occur only in the Americas. Only the very "modern" Saturniidae are widely distributed across most parts of the world. Thus, it is quite safe to assume – even in the absence of a comprehensive fossil record – that the first Saturniidae originated in the Neotropical region. Note that at least two of the subfamilies included below are commonly treated as separate families (Oxyteninae and Cercophaninae).

The following list arranges the subfamilies in the presumed phylogenetic sequence, from oldest to newest.

- Subfamily Oxyteninae (3 genera, 35 species)
- Subfamily Cercophaninae (4 genera, 10 species)
- Subfamily Arsenurinae (10 genera, 60 species, Neotropics)
- Subfamily Ceratocampinae (27 genera, 170 species, Americas)
- Subfamily Hemileucinae (51 genera, 630 species, Americas)
- Subfamily Agliinae (1 genus, 3 species)
- Subfamily Ludiinae (disputed) (8 genera, Africa)
- Subfamily Salassinae (1 genus, 12 species, tropics)
- Subfamily Saturniinae (59 genera, 480 species, tropical and temperate regions worldwide)

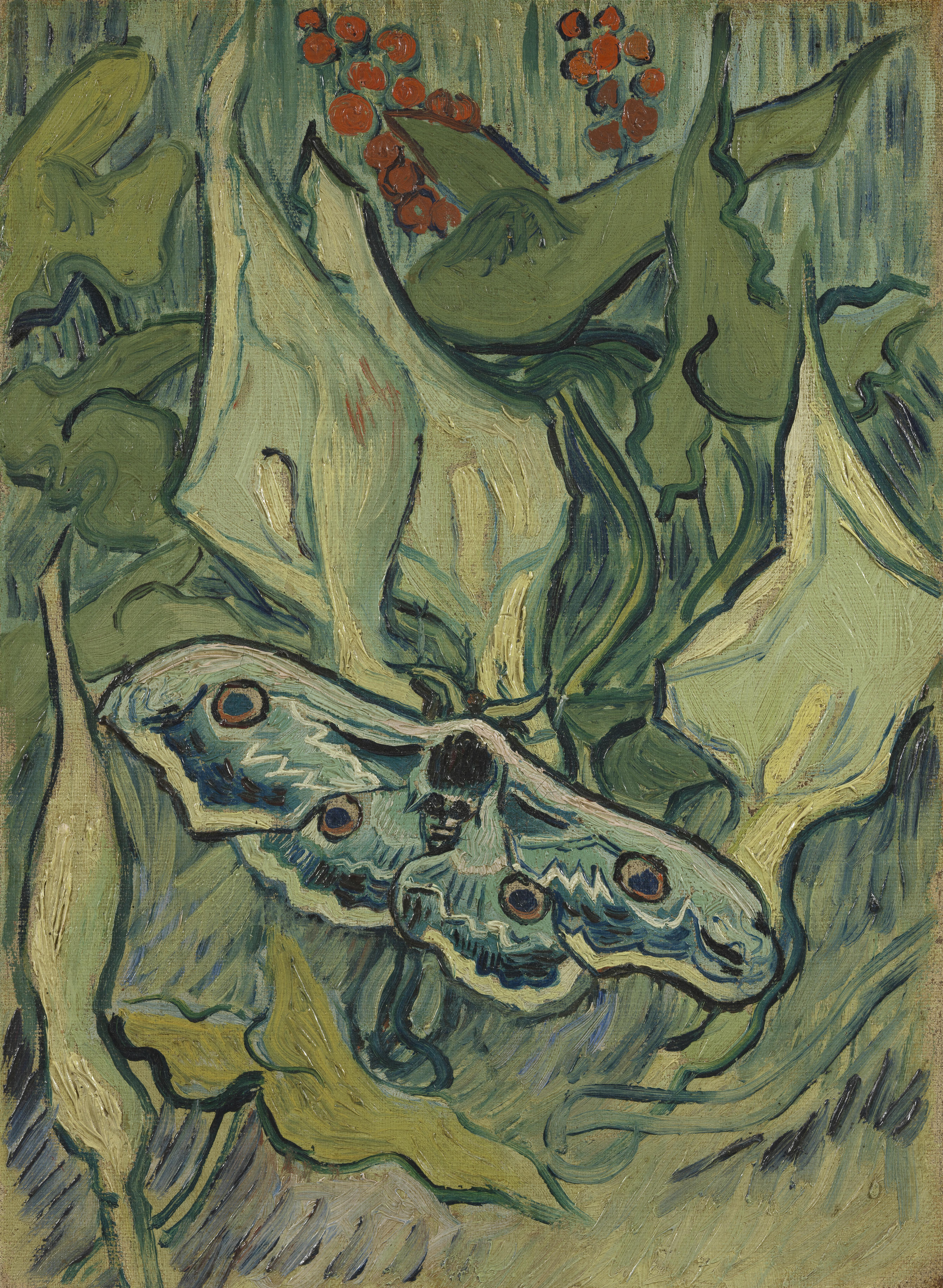
Giant Peacock Moth On Arum by Vincent van Gogh, 1889. A painting with Saturnia pyri, a saturniid moth, as motif.

== See also ==
- Carthaea saturnioides, the sole member of the family Carthaeidae, a close relative to the Saturniidae
