= Sierra Madre Occidental pine–oak forests =

Temperate broadleaf and mixed forests ecoregion of Mexico and the United States

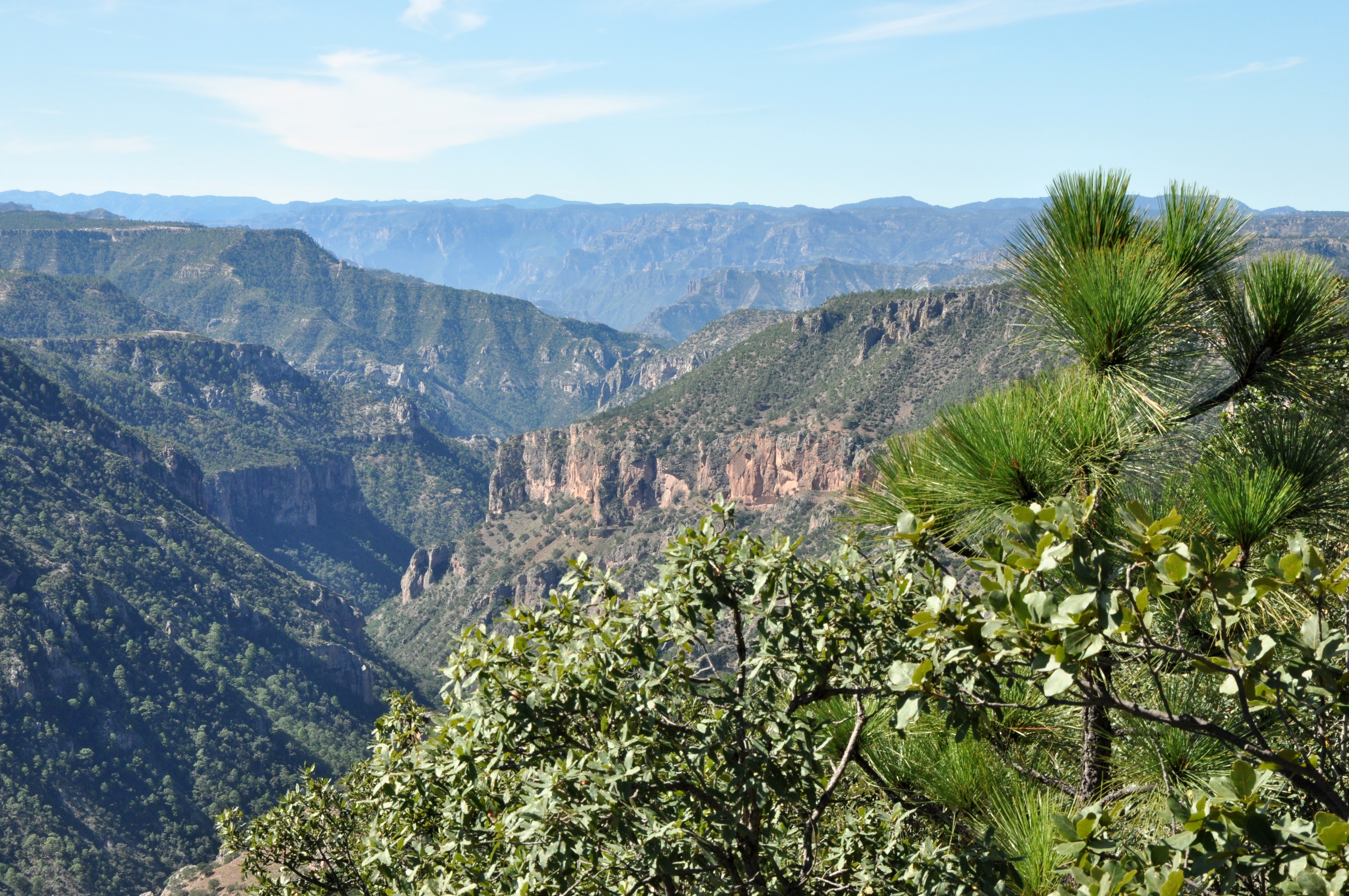
- Pine-oak forest in the valley of the San Ignacio River near Guajurana, Chihuahua.

- Sierra Madre Occidental pine–oak forests

Ecology
- Realm: Nearctic
- Biome: Temperate broadleaf and mixed forests
- Borders: List: Sinaloan dry forests; Bajío dry forests; Central Mexican matorral; Meseta Central matorral; Chihuahuan Desert; Sonoran Desert; Sonoran-Sinaloan transition subtropical dry forest
- Bird species: 319
- Mammal species: 164

Geography
- Area: 222,700 km^{2} (86,000 mi^{2})
- Countries: United States; Mexico
- States: Arizona; New Mexico; Sonora; Chihuahua; Durango; Zacatecas; Jalisco

Conservation
- Conservation status: Critical/endangered
- Global 200: Yes
- Habitat loss: 5.3745%
- Protected: 13.52%

The Sierra Madre Occidental pine–oak forests (Spanish: Bosques de pino-roble de la Sierra Madre Occidental) are a Temperate broadleaf and mixed forests ecoregion of the Sierra Madre Occidental range from the southwest USA region to the western part of Mexico. They are home to a large number of endemic plants and important habitat for wildlife.

== Geography ==
The Sierra Madre Occidental runs north to south in western Mexico from the center of the country toward the United States border. The Sierra Madre Occidental is Mexico's largest range, and the ecoregion extends approximately 1,200 kilometers from southern Arizona to northern Jalisco. The highest peak is Cerro Mohinora (3,300 m) in southern Chihuahua. This is a dramatic landscape of steep mountains cut through with canyons, including Copper Canyon, the deepest in North America.

The ecoregion consists of a complex of high-elevation pine–oak forests surrounded at lower elevations by deserts and xeric shrublands and tropical dry forests, including the Sonoran Desert to the northwest, the Chihuahuan Desert to the northeast and east in Arizona, the Meseta Central matorral and Central Mexican matorral to the southeast, and the Sinaloan dry forests to the west and southwest. The Sierra Madre Occidental pine–oak forests are one of the Madrean pine–oak forests ecoregions, which are found throughout the Sierra Madre ranges of Mexico and the US Southwest.

The northernmost portion of the ecoregion includes forest enclaves on the Madrean Sky Islands, isolated mountain ranges that rise up out of the desert of southern Arizona and New Mexico in the US and northern Sonora in Mexico.

The northern Sierra extends from the US-Mexico border through eastern Sonora and western Chihuahua south to the barranca (gorge) of the Urique River, between 27° and 28° N latitude. The northern Sierra has a mean elevation of 2,350 m, and its climate is colder and more continental than the rest of the range.

The central Sierra extends from the Urique barranca to the valley of the San Pedro Mezquital River, which cuts through the range from north to south between 22°50’ and 23°25’ N latitude. The central Sierra covers portions of southwestern Chihuahua, southern Durango, and eastern Sinaloa. It has a mean elevation is 2650 m, and includes several peaks above 3200 m.

The southern Sierra extends from the San Pedro Mezquital valley into northern Jalisco. It consists of several north–south trending ranges separated by wide canyons where lowland tropical and interior arid vegetation converge. The southern Sierra covers portions of eastern Nayarit, southeastern Durango, western Zacatecas, northern Jalisco, and western Aguascalientes. The ecoregion also covers the western end of the Trans-Mexican Volcanic Belt in Nayarit, including the Sierra de San Juan.

== Climate ==
The climate of the ecoregion varies with elevation and location. Temperatures are cooler at higher elevations, and the very highest peaks have year-round snow. The western slope of the mountains, which faces toward the Gulf of California and Pacific Ocean, generally receives higher rainfall and has milder winters than the eastern slope, which faces interior desert plateaus. Mean annual rainfall averages 553 mm (21.8 in). Rainfall is generally higher in the summer, and August is typically the wettest month.

== Flora ==
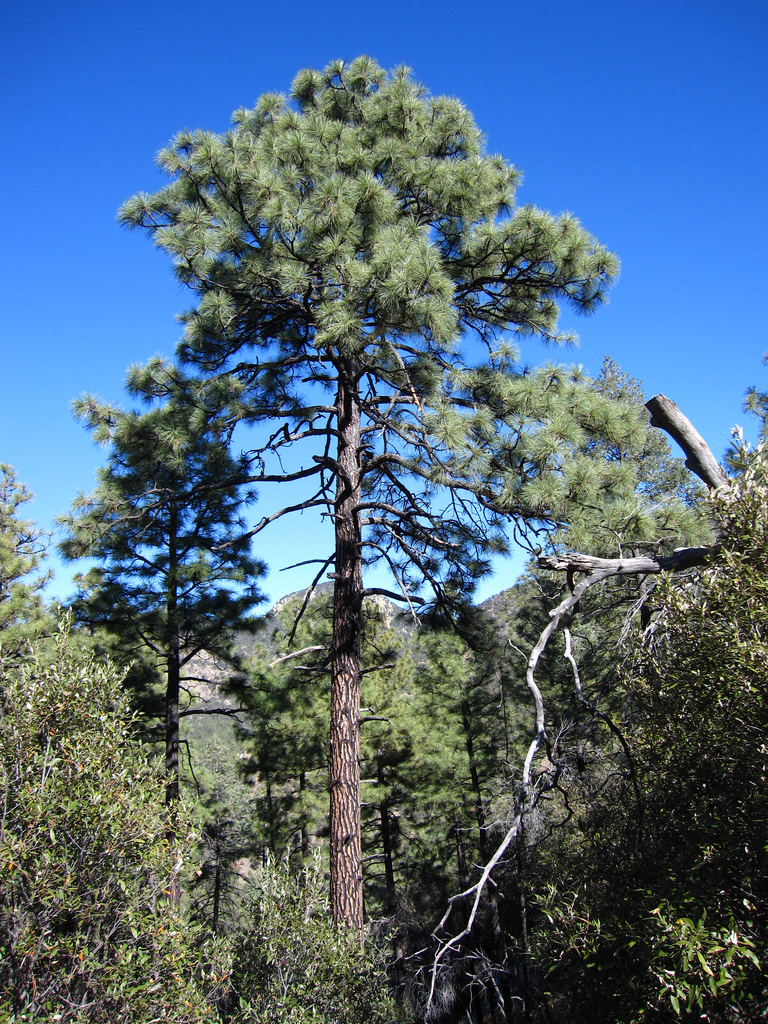
Apache pine (Pinus engelmannii) in the Chiricahua Mountains of southeastern Arizona.

Species of pine (Pinus) and oak (Quercus) are the predominant trees in the ecoregion. Plant communities vary with rainfall, elevation, temperature, and soils, and species can vary between the sky island, northern, central, and southern portions of the range. The most common plant communities are pine forest, pine–oak forest, oak forest, and oak or pine-oak woodland, with smaller areas of mixed conifer forest, mesophytic forest, montane meadow, primary or secondary chaparral, and juniper scrub.

- Pine forests occur from 1600 to 3200 meters elevation under a variety of conditions. The species vary with location and conditions. Arizona pine (Pinus arizonica), Apache pine (Pinus engelmannii), and Chihuahua pine (Pinus leiophylla var. chihuahuana) are common in the northern and central portions of the range. Pinus durangensis and Pinus teocote are found from the Sierra of central Chihuahua to the southern end of the range. Pinus lumholtzii and Pinus luzmariae are found on thin, rocky, and acidic soils. Pinus cooperi can form single-species stands in mountain valleys with deep soils. Pinus oocarpa, Pinus pseudostrobus, Pinus gordoniana, Pinus herrerae, Pinus devoniana, and Pinus maximinoi are found in more humid areas on the western slope of the mountains.
- Mixed conifer forests are found in small patches on humid slopes and canyons in the northern portion of the range from 1900 to 3300 meters elevation. Trees include Douglas-fir – Rocky Mountain Douglas-fir (Pseudotsuga menziesii var. glauca) in the north, and Mexican Douglas-fir (Pseudotsuga lindleyana) extending further south – along with species of pine, fir (Abies durangensis and Abies concolor) and spruce (Picea chihuahuana and Picea engelmannii var. mexicana), and sometimes oaks.
- Pine-oak forests are the most widespread plant community in the ecoregion, occurring from 1250 to 3200 meters elevation. In the northern Sierra, Pinus arizonica, Pinus engelmannii, and Pinus leiophylla var. chihuahuana are typically found with Quercus rugosa and/or Quercus gambelii, and with other oaks in semi-dry temperate zones. On thin soils and rocky slopes, Pinus lumholtzii grows with Quercus crassifolia, and with Quercus radiata in the southern Sierra, and the shrubs Arctostaphylos pungens, Juniperus deppeana, and Juniperus durangensis. Mixed forests of Quercus jonesii, Pinus lumholtzii, Quercus resinosa, Quercus crassifolia, and Quercus viminea grow between 1800 and 2300 meters elevation. On the lower slopes of the western Sierra, Pinus oocarpa grows with Pinus devoniana, Pinus gordoniana, Quercus viminea, Quercus confertifolia (syn. Quercus gentryi), and other species. In the southern Sierra of Durango, Jalisco, and Zacatecas, Pinus oocarpa, Quercus resinosa, and Quercus coffeicolor (syn. Quercus prainiana) occur together at lower elevations.
- Oak forests are typically found at lower elevations in the western Sierra, occurring in pockets among the dry forests as low as 350 meters elevation, and in some places extending up to 2900 meters elevation. Quercus fulva, Quercus mcvaughii, and Quercus scytophylla grow together at lower elevations, and higher-elevation forests of Quercus sideroxyla and Quercus rugosa are found up to 2900 meters. Quercus viminea or Quercus castanea are common oak forest species in the northern Sierra, joined by Quercus diversifolia and Q. gentryi. Quercus albocincta occurs at lower elevations. Mesophytic oak forests of Quercus calophylla, Quercus crassifolia, Quercus diversifolia, and Quercus scytophylla are found in humid areas, joined by species of Clethra and by Quercus subspathulata at low elevations.
- Oak and pine–oak woodlands, with an open tree canopy, are found in the drier east and north, in the transition to the lower-elevation dry grasslands and desert plateaus. In the northern Sierra of northern Sonora and Chihuahua, blue oak (Q. oblongifolia), Emory oak (Q. emoryi) or Arizona oak (Q. arizonica) grow in pure stands, or mixed stands with Mexican pinyon (Pinus cembroides), Pinus leiophylla var. chihuahuana, madroño (Arbutus arizonica), Quercus grisea, and Quercus chihuahuensis. In the eastern foothills of the Sierra woodlands of P. cembroides and Q. grisea or Q. eduardii are common. P. leiophylla var. chihuahuana, P. engelmannii, and Q. durifolia commonly occur in the eastern Sierra at the transition between lower-elevation woodlands and higher-elevation forests. Juniperus deppeana is a common woodland shrub, and the woodlands are interspersed with areas of primary or secondary montane chaparral, characterized by woody shrubs.
- Mesophytic forests are found in small areas of the western Sierra with moister microclimates from 1000 to 2350 meters elevation. Characteristic trees include Magnolia tarahumara, Ostrya virginiana, Tilia mexicana, Cedrela odorata, and Styrax argenteus var. ramirezii, together with trees in the laurel family (Lauraceae) like Persea liebmannii and species of Nectandra and Litsea, along with the oaks Q. calophylla, Q. crassifolia, Q. castanea, Q. rugosa, Q. scytophylla, and Q. splendens. Characteristic shrubs and small trees include Arbutus xalapensis, Garrya laurifolia, Cornus disciflora, Cornus excelsa, Peltostigma pteleoides, Ilex quercetorum, Ilex tolucana, Cleyera integrifolia, species of Clethra and Prunus, and the palm Brahea aculeata. Conifers in the mesophytic forests can include Pinus maximinoi, P. devoniana, P. gordoniana, P. herrerae, P. strobiformis, P. durangensis, Abies durangensis, and/or Pseudotsuga lindleyana.
- Montane meadow, which includes many endemic species, is found in small areas between 2300 and 3100 meters elevation.

The pines and oaks are especially important as there are so many different species of each including a number of endemics. Predominant conifers among the 27 species found here include Apache pine (Pinus engelmannii), Chihuahua pine (Pinus leiophylla), Mexican pinyon (Pinus cembroides), Lumholtz's pine (Pinus lumholtzii), Yécora pine (Pinus pseudostrobus), Rocky Mountain Douglas-fir (Pseudotsuga menziesii subsp. glauca), and Mexican Douglas-fir (Pseudotsuga lindleyana).

Oaks (Quercus) are the dominant broadleaf trees, with 21 different species found including Quercus albocincta, Arizona oak (Q. arizonica) Q. carmenensis, Q. chihuahuensis, Q. durifolia, Emory oak (Q. emoryi), Q. grisea, Mexican blue oak (Q. oblongifolia), Q. santaclarensis, Q. striatula, and Q. tarahumara. Madroño (Arbutus xalapensis and A. arizonica) is found in association with oaks. Q. carmenensis and Q. deliquescens are two oaks endemic to the sky islands portion of the ecoregion.

== Fauna ==
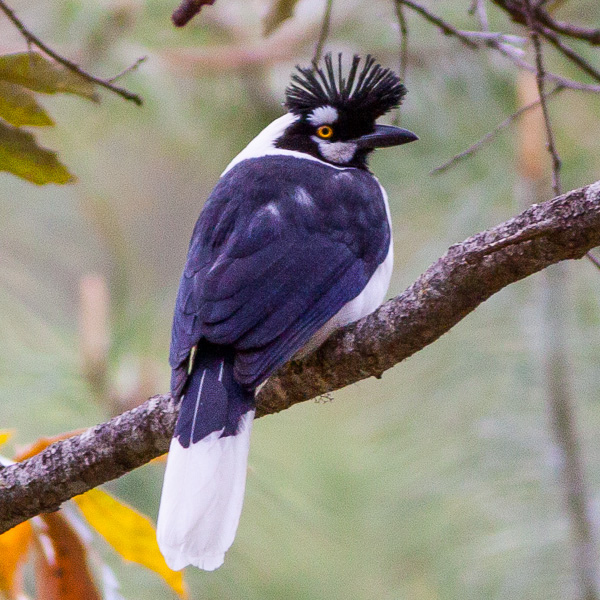
The tufted jay (Cyanocorax dickeyi) is endemic to the ecoregion.

The forests are home to more than 300 species of birds, including golden eagle (Aquila chrysaetos), military macaw (Ara militaris), acorn woodpecker (Melanerpes formicivorus), and Mexican spotted owl (Strix occidentalis lucida). Endemic species include the tufted jay (Cyanocorax dickeyi), green-striped brushfinch (Arremon virenticeps), and thick-billed parrot (Rhynchopsitta pachyrhyncha) which is now endangered from trapping for collections. The eared quetzal (Euptilptis neoxenus) is a near-endemic, ranging from the sky islands of southern Arizona through the Sierra Madre Occidental to the western Trans-Mexican Volcanic Belt pine–oak forests. The imperial woodpecker (Campephilus imperialis), once native to the mountains, is now thought to be extinct.

Mammals include the Coues deer (Odocoileus virginianus couesi), American black bear (Ursus americanus), cougar (Puma concolor), and jaguar (Panthera onca). The Mexican grizzly bear (Ursus arctos horribilis) is now thought to be extinct. The Mexican wolf (Canis lupus baileyi) was once common in the mountains but by the late 20th century was thought to be extinct in the wild. They were saved from extinction by a joint US-Mexican captive breeding program. The wolves were reintroduced to the wild in the US in 1998 and Mexico in 2011, and now inhabit portions of the ecoregion in Arizona, New Mexico, Chihuahua, and Sonora.

The many reptiles include the rock rattlesnake (Crotalus lepidus), twin-spotted rattlesnake (Crotalus pricei), ridgenose rattlesnake (Crotalus willardi), and some spiny lizards (Sceloporus clarki, S. jarrovii, S. scalaris and S. virgatus).

Finally, the mountains are an important stage in the migration route of monarch butterflies.

== Conservation and threats ==
The pine forests have been cleared by the logging and paper industries since the 1800s and only a very small percentage of original forest remains. This removal of habitat has resulted in the presumed extinction of the imperial woodpecker, once the largest woodpecker on earth.

The increase of global warming is expected to have some devastating effects on the pine trees located in the Sierra Madre Occidental. The predicted outcome of global warming in this subtropical region, is the reduction of plant/animal productivity and growth. Another effect would be that the increase of climate warming would also lead to tree mortality affecting not only the pine trees located in the Sierra Madre Occidental but also other pine trees in the surrounding areas.

== Protected areas ==
13.5% of the ecoregion is in protected areas.

Protected areas in Mexico include Cascada de Basaseachi National Park, Cumbres de Majalca National Park, La Michilía Biosphere Reserve, Sierra de San Juan Biosphere Reserve, Bavispe Flora and Fauna Protection Area, Sierra de Álamos–Río Cuchujaqui Flora and Fauna Protection Area, Campo Verde Flora and Fauna Protection Area, Papigochic Flora and Fauna Protection Area, Sierra de Órganos National Park, Tutuaca Flora and Fauna Protection Area, and Cerro Mohinora Flora and Fauna Protection Area. The Cuenca Alimentadora del Distrito Nacional de Riego 043 Estado de Nayarit, established in 1949 to protect forests and watersheds, is now a natural resources protection area which conserves much of the southern Sierra.

There are a number of protected areas of Madrean sky islands in Arizona which are part of the ecoregion although not the Sierra Madre Occidental themselves, including Chiricahua National Monument, Galiuro Wilderness, the Rincon Mountain district of Saguaro National Park, the Huachuca Mountains, Pusch Ridge Wilderness Area, the Santa Teresa Mountains and the Pajarito Mountains.

In 2000 CONABIO, a Mexico's wildlife conservation agency, identified priority areas for conservation, based on exceptional biodiversity and the integrity of the remaining habitat. Priorties in the northern Sierra include Cananea–San Pedro, Sierras los Ajos–Buenos Aires–La Púrica, Cañada Mazocahui, Sierras el Maviro–Santo Niño, Bavispe/El Tigre, Babícora, Yécora–El Reparo, Bassaseachic, and Lago los Mexicanos. In the central Sierra, priority areas include Alta Tarahumara–Barrancas, Cañón de Chínipas, Sierra Álamos–El Cuchujaqui, Barranca Sinforosa, Rocahuachi–Nanaruchi, Río Humaya, Guadalupe y Calvo–Mohinora, San Juan de Camarones, Pueblo Nuevo, and Santiaguillo–Promontorio. Priority areas in the southern Sierra include Guacamayita, the Río Jesús María basin (cuenca del Río Jesús María), Sierra los Huicholes, Sierra de Morones, and Sierra Fría.

== See also ==
- Conifers of Mexico
- List of ecoregions in Mexico
- List of ecoregions in the United States (WWF)
