= Papigochic Flora and Fauna Protection Area =

Protected area in Chihuahua, Mexico

- Área de Protección de Flora y Fauna Papigochic
- IUCN category VI (protected area with sustainable use of natural resources)
- Location within Mexico
- Coordinates: 28°15′34.8″N 107°45′39.2″W
- Area: 222,764 ha (860.10 sq mi)
- Designation: Flora and fauna protection area
- Designated: 2003
- Governing body: National Commission of Natural Protected Areas

Papigochic Flora and Fauna Protection Area is a protected area in Chihuahua state of Mexico. It covers an area of 2227.64 km^{2} in the eastern Sierra Madre Occidental. To the northwest it adjoins Tutuaca Flora and Fauna Protection Area.

== Flora and fauna ==
According to the National Biodiversity Information System of Comisión Nacional para el Conocimiento y Uso de la Biodiversidad (CONABIO) in Papigochic Flora and Fauna Protection Area there are over 665 plant and animal species from which 40 are in at risk category and 14 are exotics.

The flora and fauna protection area protects a portion of the Sierra Madre Occidental pine–oak forests. Forests and woodlands of oak and pine are the characteristic communities.

Pine forests are found in the high elevation portion of the Sierra Tarahumara between 2400 and 3200 meters elevation. Characteristic species include Pinus arizonica, Pinus engelmannii, Pinus durangensis, Pinus durangensis var. quinquefoliata, Pinus ayacahuite, Pinus leiophylla, and Pinus lumholtzii. Other conifers include Rocky Mountain Douglas-fir (Pseudotsuga menziesii var. glauca), Abies durangensis, Abies concolor, Cupressus arizonica, and Juniperus deppeana. Associated oaks include Quercus rugosa, Quercus sideroxyla, and Quercus crassifolia. Other broadleaf trees include Arbutus xalapensis, Arbutus arizonica, Fraxinus gooddingii, Populus tremuloides, and Prunus serotina.

Oak woodland is found at lower elevations on the eastern side of the Sierra, particularly on east- and southeast-facing slopes. Trees range from 5 to 15 meters high, with a more open canopy. The dominant oaks are Quercus sideroxyla, Quercus arizonica, and Quercus durifolia. Madroño (Arbutus arizonica) is also prominent. Associated pines include Pinus engelmannii, Pinus leiophyla, Pinus leiophyla var. chihuahuana, Pinus lumholtzii, and Pinus arizonica, and Juniperus monosperma is also present. Understory herbs and grasses include Penstemon campanulatus, Lupinus marschallianus, Pteridium aquilinum, Packera candidissima, Taraxacum officinale, Piptochaetium afimbriatum, Muhlenbergia montana, Bouteloua gracilis, Zuloagaea bulbosa, and Bromus anomalus.

Papigochic is home to 126 species of birds, of which five are threatened species, and 3 are endangered. Native birds include the thick-billed parrot (Rhynchopsitta pachyrhyncha), bald eagle (Haliaeetus leucocephalus), Cooper's hawk (Accipter cooperii), sharp-shinned hawk (Accipiter striatus), zone-tailed hawk (Buteo albonotatus), peregrine falcon (Falco peregrinus) common black hawk (Buteogallus anthracinus), Gould's wild turkey (Meleagris gallopavo mexicanus), Clark's nutcracker (Nucifraga columbiana), eared quetzal (Euptilotis neoxenus), Mexican spotted owl (Strix occidentalis lucida), Montezuma quail (Cyrtonyx montezumae), Arizona woodpecker (Leuconotopicus arizonae), American dipper (Cinclus mexicanus), Townsend's solitaire (Myadestes townsendi), brown-backed solitaire (Myadestes occidentalis), Sinaloa martin (Progne sinaloae), and Aztec thrush (Ridgwayia pinicola).

Native mammals include the American black bear (Ursus americanus) Abert's squirrel (Sciurus aberti), Sierra Madre ground squirrel (Callospermophilus madrensis), and southern flying squirrel (Glaucomys volans).

Native fishes include the Mexican stoneroller (Campostoma ornatum), Yaquí sucker (Catostomus bernardini), and bicolor minnow (Dionda dichroma).

== Protection ==
The protected area was designated in 2003.
