= Conifers of Mexico =

Mexican conifers extend mainly across the main mountain ranges Sierra Madre Oriental, Sierra Madre Occidental and the Trans-Mexican Volcanic Belt. Enclosed between these mountains there are dispersed groups of conifers in mid and high elevations valleys when rainfall conditions allow their growth. Mexican conifers grow in some places often associated with oaks.

The dry season is about 7–8 months. Most rainfall (80-95%) occurs from June to October (5 months) and for only four months in the north. Precipitation throughout the year is present only in a little portion of the Sierra Madre Oriental in the State of Veracruz. The greatest number of species belong to the Pinus genus, including about 60 species and subspecies.

Mexican conifers growing in subtropical climates include Pinus chiapensis, Pinus oocarpa, and Pinus tecunumanii.

Mexican conifers in temperate-to-cool climates are as follow:

- Pinus ayacahuite
- Pinus cembroides
- Pinus durangensis
- Pinus engelmanii
- Pinus greggii
- Pinus hartwegii
- Pinus leiophylla
- Pinus lumholtzii
- Pinus devoniana
- Pinus montezumae
- Pinus nelsonii
- Pinus oocarpa var. trifoliata
- Pinus patula
- Pinus pseudostrobus
- Pinus teocote
- Taxodium mucronatum
- Abies religiosa
- Cupressus lusitanica

Mexican conifers that grow exclusively in cool climates are Pinus hartwegii and Pinus rudis.

== Cultivation and uses ==
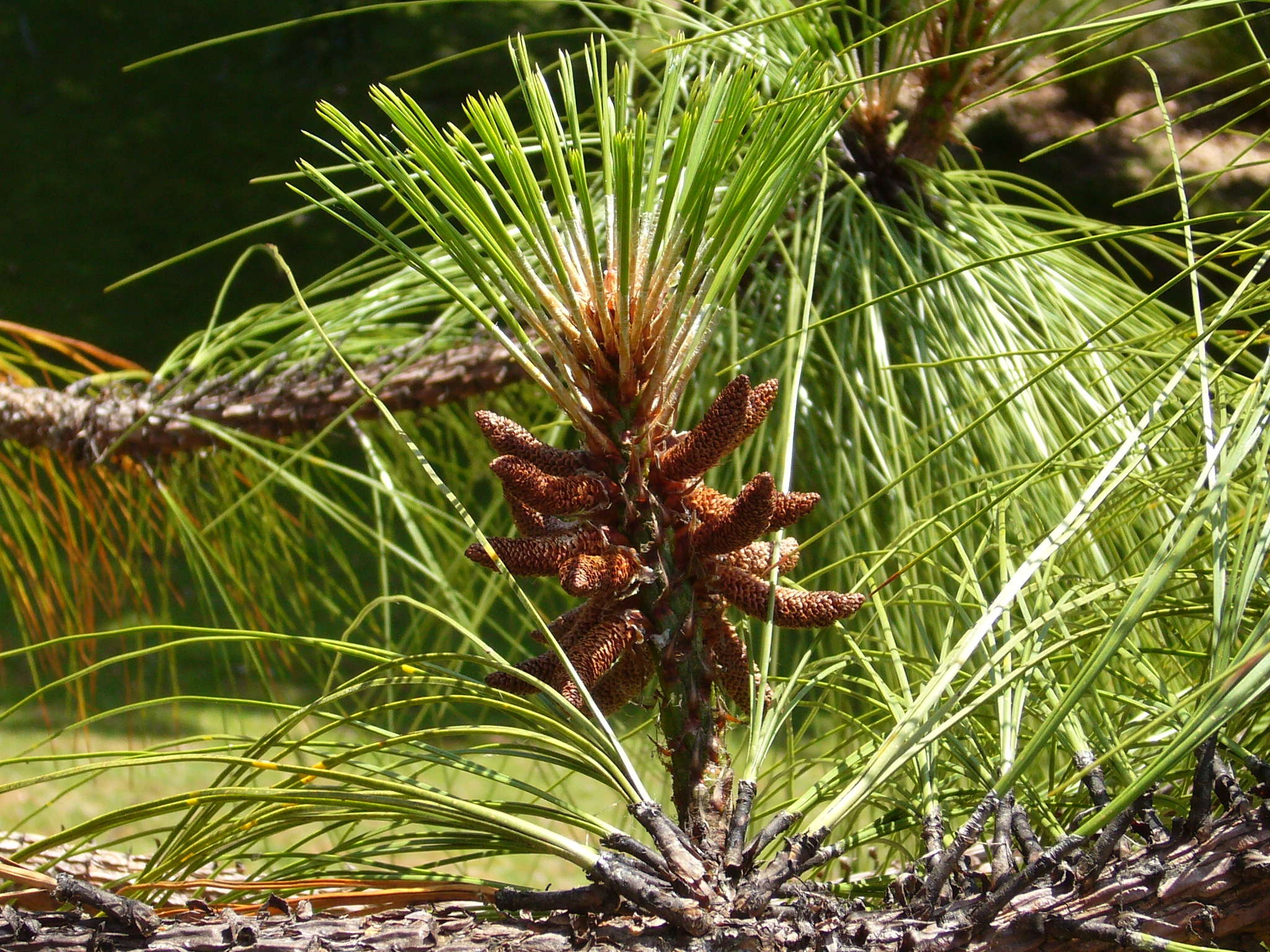
Pinus devoniana at Hackfalls Arboretum, New Zealand

Some of the trees are harvested locally for their wood, which is used mainly in boards, construction, rustic furniture and in paper production. Resin is extracted from some species. Some trees are esteemed for their seeds: Pinus nelsonii, Pinus maximartinezii, Pinus cembroides and Pinus orizabenzis.

Mexican conifers have been recently started to be introduced in different parts around the world, and their plantations are considered very important. The leading reason for that expansion is the good quality that their wood has for paper production, but they are also planted as ornamental due to their unique characteristics and as exotic plants. The main genera used with this purposes are pines, cypresses and firs and taxodiums.

In their natural environment, they grow from 30° to 14° North Latitude, at altitudes between 600 and 4300 meters above sea level. There are some advantages for their introduction in several places in different altitudes, latitudes and climates: The average rainfall in regions where they occur fluctuates between 380 and 2000 millimeters a year. Above 2400 meters' elevation, snowfall is usual. Moist conditions vary from a short season of rainfall in summer to a climate with rainfall throughout the year, and can develop from semiarid to very wet conditions. In general they can withstand dry summers and some of are drought tolerant in several degrees. They grow from subtropical to cool climates; the average temperature varies from 24 °C to 10 °C. Some are surprisingly hardy (Pinus hartweggi, Pinus rudis, Pinus ayacahuite, etc.), tolerating temperatures as low as -30 °C. These trees occur on very tilted slopes and plain valleys.

Mexican conifers from temperate and cool climates which are being cultivated in other countries for paper industry according to altitudinal, latitudinal and climatic characteristics:

Near or on the Equator at high altitudes:

Pinus leiophylla in Kenya. Pinus montezumae in Kenya. Pinus ayacahuite in Kenya, Tanzania, Cupressus lusitanica in Colombia where it is used for creating windbreaks curtains in mountain slopes and fighting against soil erosion. Pinus greggi in Colombia. Pinus patula in Ecuador (3500 m), Colombia (3300 m), Kenya, Tanzania, Papua New Guinea.

In tropical latitudes at high altitudes:

Pinus leiophylla in Malawi, Zimbabwe, Zambia. Pinus montezumae in Malawi, Botswana and Zimbabwe. Pinus ayacahuite in Angola. Pinus greggi in Zimbabwe and Bolivia. Pinus patula in Bolivia, Zimbabwe, Angola, Hawaii. Cupressus lusitanica in Bolivia

In Subtropical latitudes at mid and high altitudes:

Pinus leiophylla in South Africa and Queensland, Australia. Pinus montezumae in South Africa and Queensland, Australia. Pinus cembroides in South Africa (produces edible nuts) Pinus ayacahuite in Southern Brazil and Northern India, Northern Argentina in Salta and Tucumán Provinces. Cupressus lusitanica in South Africa. Pinus greggi in South Africa and Southern Brazil. Pinus patula in South Africa, Northern India and Southern Brazil

Mexican conifers from subtropical climates that are being planted in tropical and subtropical latitudes at low and mid altitudes for paper industry:

Pinus oocarpa in Ecuador, Kenya, Zambia, Colombia, Bolivia, Brazil, South Africa and Queensland, Australia. Pinus chiapensis in Colombia, Brazil, Queensland, Australia and South Africa. Pinus tecunumanni Colombia, Brazil, Queensland, Australia and South Africa.

Mexican conifers from temperate and cool climates and from mid and high altitudes that are being cultivated near sea level for paper industry:

New Zealand has been a pioneer country in cultivating massively trees from high altitudes and tropical latitudes and it has proved that Mexican conifers can thrive in big extensions near sea level when temperature and rainfall conditions are favorable. Most of this species are fully naturalized. Mexican conifers planted in New Zealand are:

Cupressus lusitanica, Pinus ayacahuite, Pinus devoniana, Pinus patula, Pinus pseudostrobus, Pinus montezumae

Mexican conifers that have been planted with forestation purposes at temperate latitudes at mid and low altitudes:

Pinus patula and cupressus lusitanica in the Argentine provinces of Córdoba and San Luis at lower altitudes than its origin site but with a similar temperate climate with rainfalls in summer.

Mexican conifers from mid and high altitudes that have been planted as ornamental at temperate latitudes near sea level:

Cupressus lusitanica in the United Kingdom; Austin, Texas; Buenos Aires, Argentina and Northern Portugal, Pinus ayacahuite in the United Kingdom, Pinus devoniana in France, Pinus hartweggi in the United Kingdom, Pinus montezumae in southern New South Wales, Australia

== References and external links ==
- Eguiluz T.1982. Clima y Distribución del género pinus en México. Distrito Federal. Mexico.
- Rzedowski J. 1983. Vegetación de México. Distrito Federal, Mexico.
- Dvorak, W. S., G. R. Hodge, E. A. Gutiérrez, L. F. Osorio, F. S. Malan and T. K. Stanger. 2000. Conservation and Testing of Tropical and Subtropical Forest Species by the CAMCORE Cooperative. College of Natural Resources, NCSU. Raleigh, NC. USA.
- Martínez, Maximinio. 1978. Catálogo de nombres vulgares y científicos de plantas mexicanas.
- Richardson D.M. (Ed) 2005. Ecology and biogeography of Pinus. Department of Conservation. South Island Wilding Conifer Strategy. New Zealand.
- Chandler, N.G. Pulpwood plantations in South Africa. Proc. Aust. Paper Indus. Tech. Ass.
- Gutiérrez, Millán, W. Ladrach. 1980. Resultados a tres años de la siembra directa de semillas de Cupressus lusitanica y Pinus patula en finca Los Guaduales Departamento del Cauca. Informe de Investigación 60. Cali, Colombia. Cartón de Colombia S.A. 6 p.
- Conifers of Mexico - Database
- Conifers of Mexico - F.A.O. link
- Mexican Conifers - Species lists, Collection Data, Genetics
