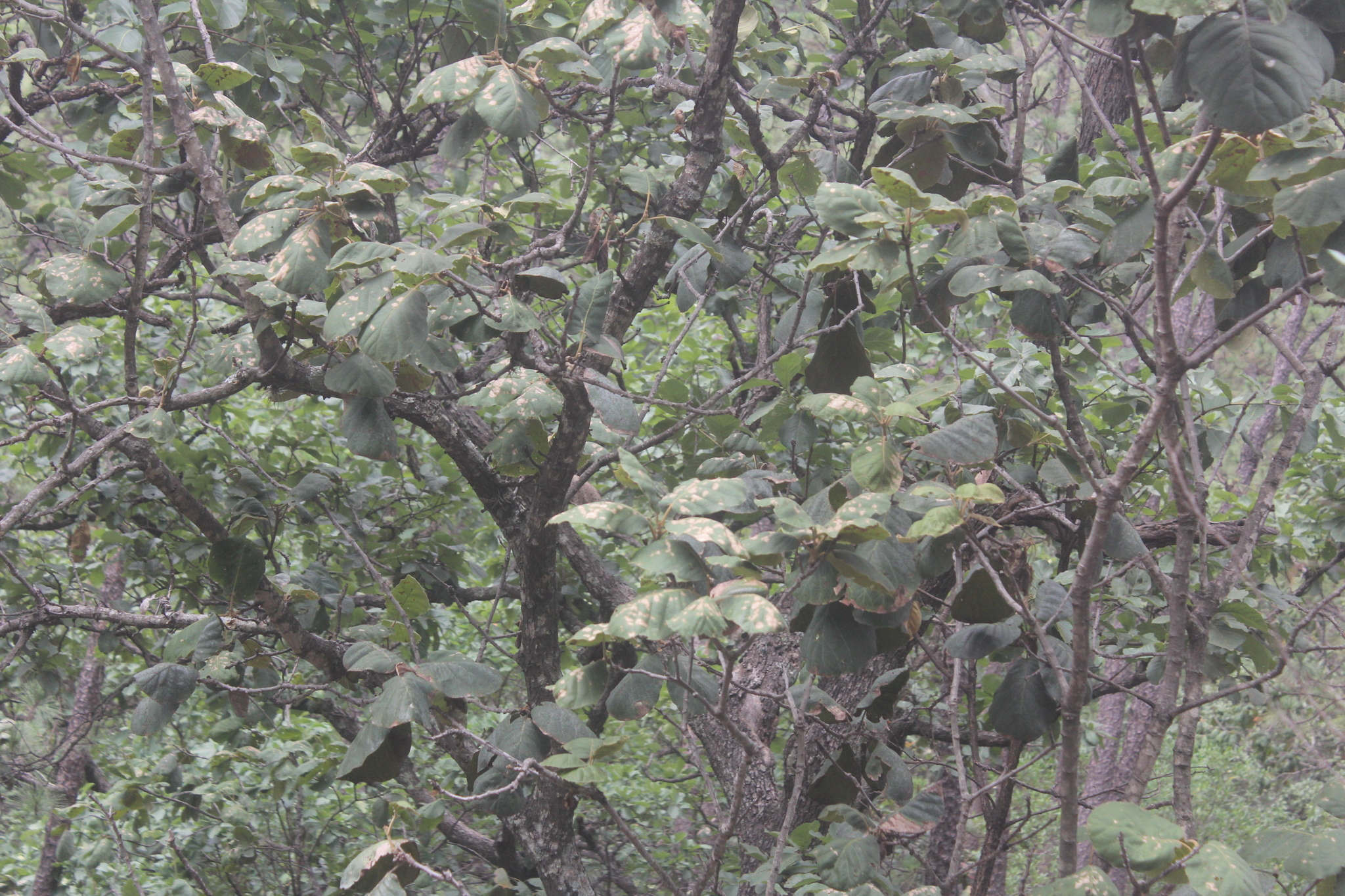

Conservation status
- Least Concern (IUCN 3.1)

Scientific classification
- Kingdom: Plantae
- Clade: Embryophytes
- Clade: Tracheophytes
- Clade: Spermatophytes
- Clade: Angiosperms
- Clade: Eudicots
- Clade: Rosids
- Order: Fagales
- Family: Fagaceae
- Genus: Quercus
- Subgenus: Quercus subg. Quercus
- Section: Quercus sect. Lobatae
- Species: Q. tarahumara

Binomial name
- Quercus tarahumara Spellenb., J.R.Bacon & Breedlove

= Quercus tarahumara =

Species of oak tree

Quercus tarahumara (also called Tarahumara oak) is a species of oak tree in the beech family. It grows in the Sierra Madre Occidental in the Mexican States of Chihuahua, Sonora, Durango, and Sinaloa. Some of the populations lie within the territory occupied by the Tarahumara people, after whom the species is named. It is placed in Quercus section Lobatae.

== Description ==
Quercus tarahumara trees reach 10 meters (33 feet) tall. The leaves are rather large for the genus, up to 30 centimeters (1 ft) across, with the stiffness of cardboard, green on top but tan on the underside. It is sometimes called the "handbasin oak" because its size and shape suggest a bathroom sink.

== Range and habitat ==
Quercus tarahumara is found on the western slopes of the northern Sierra Madre Occidental in northwestern Mexico. Its range includes the Sierra of southeastern Sonora, southwestern Chihuahua, northeastern Sinaloa, and northwestern Durango states, along with several sky island ranges lying west of the main mass of the Sierra in Sonora and Chihuahua.

Quercus tarahumara is found in forest and woodland between 1,020 and 2,200 meters elevation. It occurs on the igneous and presumably acid substrate, on reddish or pale gray epithermically or hydrothermically altered substrate, and benches of white ashy soil. It typically grows in 'islands' in oak forests and woodlands, in association with Q. albocincta, Q. arizonica, Q. chihuahuensis, Q. jonesii, Q. hypoleucoides, Q. mcvaughii, Q. oblongifolia, Q. toumeyi, and Q. viminea.

== Conservation and threats ==
The population of Quercus tarahumara has been little studied. There is no evidence of population decline, and the species' conservation status is assessed as Least Concern.

The oaks of the Sierra Madre Occidental are extensively logged for timber and pulp. There are populations of Quercus tarahumara in protected areas, including Cascada de Basaseachi National Park, Papigochic Flora and Fauna Protection Area, and Tutuaca Flora and Fauna Protection Area.
