= Pine-oak Forests, Puebla =

The Pine–oak Forest of Puebla covers the mass of pine and oak forests in the Mexican state of Puebla.

== Preamble ==
Due to the geographical location of Mexico, the middle part of the country runs through the Tropic of Cancer; as such, it is located in an area of contact between boreal and tropical floras. Because of its shape, climate, topography, geology and soil, it contains a great floristic diversity and a diversity in types of vegetation. The diversity of these ecological factors explains why in Mexico there are nearly all of the plant formations observed worldwide.

The diversity of plant communities is not only due to ecological characteristics, but also from historical and evolutionary aspects. The fact that the country is in the contact area of the boreal and tropical floras allows for the development of communities where both floras fight to excel, having developed indigenous communities. Generally, it can be considered that the distribution of vegetation in Mexico is conditioned, in the first instance, by climate factors. Although frequently, geological, edaphic or topographic nature plays a very important role.

The pine–oak forest is a biome characterized by the abundance of certain species of pine and oak, of the genus Pinus and Quercus respectively.

== Characteristics ==
The pine-oak forest develops at altitudes between 1600 and 3000 meters, where the climate is temperate and humid with summer rain, with temperatures ranging between 16 and 20 degrees Celsius (which are likely to fall), and with rainfall that varies between 700 and 1500mm.

In this type of forest, many different types of rock can be found: igneous, metamorphic, and sedimentary. The soil in which they are located is thin and poorly developed, being principally litosol, regosol, and cambisol. Though, they are also located on soil originating from volcanic ash, such as andosol. Pines and firs (better known as Christmas trees) are characteristic of the pine-oak forest.

== Flora ==
In Sierra de Pahuatlán y Tetela de Ocampo, this type of forest is dispersed as isolated spots and is formed, in the tree layer (over 15m high), by species like red ocote (Pinus patula), Chinese ocote (Pinus leiophylla), ocote (Pinus montezumae), and broadleaf oak (Quercus crassifolia). The middle layer (at 6m) is made up of species like cile (Alnus jorullensis) and the strawberry tree (Arbutus xalapensis). In the lower layer (at less than 1m), there is broom or tepopote (Baccharis conferta) and Pteridium sp. The distribution of species in this type of forest varies from factors such as exposure, moisture, temperature, and wind. In the east/northeast, where the humidity and temperature are high, pinus patula predominates the top tier. In contrast, at lower altitude and with the same exposure, you can find Cornus disciflora, Garrya laurifolia, Mexican Clethra, and ferns in the lowest layer. In this exposition, where humidity is low and temperature is high, the Chinese ocote (Pinus leiophylla) dominates.

In the foothills of the Sierra Nevada, in the Malintzin and Citlaltépetl volcanoes, between 2500 and 3000 meters above sea level, the arboreal layer above 32m is dominated by the red torch pine (Pinus patula), fir (Abies religiosa), ocote brush (Pinus michoacana) and ayacahuite (Pinus ayacahuite); in the 10m layer you can find laurelillo (Quercus laurina), milkweed (Quercus crassifolia) and madrone (Arbutus glandulosa); in the 4.5m layer you can find Salix paradoxa, brush (Ageratina glabratum), wild cherry (Prunus capuli), alder (Alnus jorullensis), and strawberry trees (Arbutus glandulosa); in the 0.5m layer you find Baccharis conferta, sage (Salvia sp.), topozán (Buddleja cordata), grass (Bromus sp.) and fern (Adiantum capillus-veneris).

In the southeast, from the western slopes of Sierra de Zongolica until the municipality of Nicolas Bravo, an area of pine-oak forest is located more than 2500 meters above sea level. In it can be found species such as Pinus patula, teocote (Pinus teocote), white oak (Quercus scytophylla) and black oak (Quercus conglomerata).

== Current situation ==
In Mexico, most of these types of forests have been intensively exploited for timber extraction in the form of logs, firewood, and charcoal. They have also been cleared to make way for agriculture or to create pastures to feed cattle and horses.
