= Quercus mcvaughii =

Conservation status
- Near Threatened (IUCN 3.1)

Scientific classification
- Kingdom: Plantae
- Clade: Embryophytes
- Clade: Tracheophytes
- Clade: Spermatophytes
- Clade: Angiosperms
- Clade: Eudicots
- Clade: Rosids
- Order: Fagales
- Family: Fagaceae
- Genus: Quercus
- Subgenus: Quercus subg. Quercus
- Section: Quercus sect. Lobatae
- Species: Q. mcvaughii

Binomial name
- Quercus mcvaughii Spellenb.

Species of oak tree

Quercus mcvaughii is a species of oak tree native to Mexico.

== Description ==
Quercus mcvaughii is an evergreen or drought-deciduous tree which typically reaches 4 to 10 metres (13 to 33 feet) in height, occasionally growing to 25 m. Smaller trees often have a shrubby appearance with a dense and rounded crown. Older trees have an irregular and open form.

== Taxonomy ==
The species was first discovered in 1989 in the Sierra de Ocampo within Cascada de Basaseachi National Park, and formally described in 1992. It is closely related to Q. crassifolia.

== Distribution and habitat ==
It is native to the northern and central Sierra Madre Occidental, ranging from northern Sonora (Bavispe Flora and Fauna Protection Area) through western Chihuahua, and western Durango to southeastern Sinaloa.

Quercus mcvaughii is found on slopes, mesas, canyons, and ridges from 1,580 to 3,100 m (5,180 to 10,170 ft) in elevation, where it grows on thin, rocky soils. It is common in the oak and pine–oak woodlands of the central Sierra. It often occurs with Q. rugosa, Q. durifolia, Q. sideroxyla, Q. emoryi, Q. arizonica, Pinus arizonica, P. engelmannii, and P. leiophylla.
