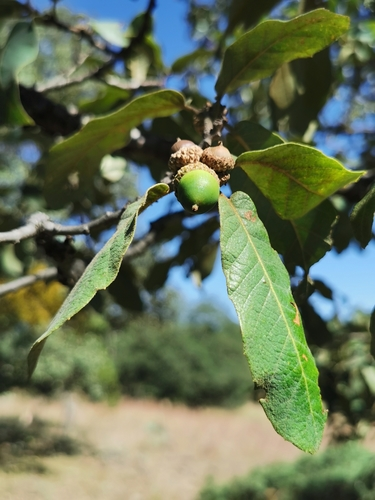

Conservation status
- Least Concern (IUCN 3.1)

Scientific classification
- Kingdom: Plantae
- Clade: Embryophytes
- Clade: Tracheophytes
- Clade: Spermatophytes
- Clade: Angiosperms
- Clade: Eudicots
- Clade: Rosids
- Order: Fagales
- Family: Fagaceae
- Genus: Quercus
- Subgenus: Quercus subg. Quercus
- Section: Quercus sect. Quercus
- Species: Q. convallata

Binomial name
- Quercus convallata Trel. (1924)

Synonyms
- Quercus reticulata f. apus (Trel.) A.Camus (1935); Quercus reticulata f. inclusa (Trel.) A.Camus (1935); Quercus rhodophlebia f. apus Trel. (1924); Quercus rhodophlebia f. inclusa Trel. (1924)

= Quercus convallata =

Species of oak tree

Quercus convallata is a species of oak endemic to western Mexico. It is a large shrub or small tree which grows to 10 to 15 meters tall. It is native to the southern Sierra Madre Occidental of northern Jalisco, Nayarit, Zacatecas, and Durango states. It grows on rocky slopes in open and relatively dry oak and pine–oak forest from 2,000 to 2,500 meters elevation.

The species was first described by William Trelease in 1924. It is placed in section Quercus.
