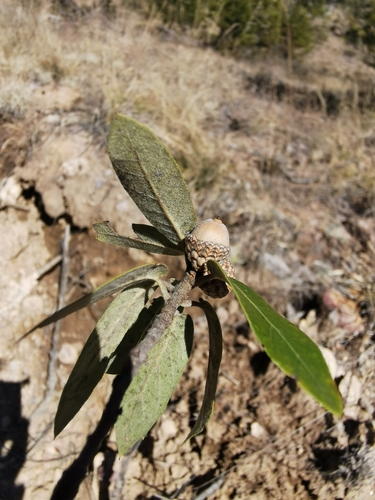

Conservation status
- Near Threatened (IUCN 3.1)

Scientific classification
- Kingdom: Plantae
- Clade: Embryophytes
- Clade: Tracheophytes
- Clade: Spermatophytes
- Clade: Angiosperms
- Clade: Eudicots
- Clade: Rosids
- Order: Fagales
- Family: Fagaceae
- Genus: Quercus
- Subgenus: Quercus subg. Quercus
- Section: Quercus sect. Lobatae
- Species: Q. durifolia

Binomial name
- Quercus durifolia Seemen ex Loes.

= Quercus durifolia =

Species of oak tree

Quercus durifolia, commonly known as encino colorado, is a species of oak tree native to Mexico.

== Description ==
Quercus durifolia is a small evergreen tree that typically reaches 6 to 9 metres (20 to 30 feet) in height, occasionally growing to 15 meters. Leaves are lanceolate or ovate, glossy and dark-green on the top and tomentose on the underside. The bark is dark gray to black, smooth when young and becoming rough and fissured with age.

== Distribution and habitat ==
It is native to the Sierra Madre Occidental, from northwestern Chihuahua to Aguascalientes and northern Jalisco, with a southeastern outlier in the mountains of Guanajuato.

It is most common on the drier eastern slopes of the Sierra, where it is generally found in open pine–oak woodland with Pinus leiophylla var. chihuahuensis and Pinus engelmannii, at the transition between lower-elevation oak and pine–oak woodlands and higher-elevation pine forests, from 1,700 to 2,300 m (5,600 to 7,500 ft) in elevation. It is generally found on gently sloping sites with deep soils, and can form pure stands on relatively flat sites with favorable soils. Other associated plants include Quercus arizonica, Pinus cooperi, Arbutus xalapensis, Fraxinus gooddingii, and Juniperus deppeana.

== Ecology ==
The acorn woodpecker (Melanerpes formicivorus) disperses its acorns in northwestern Mexico.
