= Bavispe Flora and Fauna Protection Area =

Protected area to Sonora, Mexico

- IUCN category VI (protected area with sustainable use of natural resources)
- Location within Mexico
- Location: Sonora, Mexico
- Nearest city: Nacozari de García, Sonora
- Coordinates: 30°33′30.8″N 109°47′11.7″W
- Area: 200,900 ha (776 sq mi)
- Designated: 2017
- Administrator: National Commission of Natural Protected Areas

Bavispe Flora and Fauna Protection Area is a protected area in the state of Sonora in northwestern Mexico.

The protected area consists of five separate areas, with a combined area of 2009 km^{2}, which covers portions of three ranges in northeastern Sonora, the Sierra Los Ajos, Sierra Buenos Aires, and Sierra La Púrica. These ranges are part of the northern Sierra Madre Occidental, and lie in the upper basin of the Yaqui River.

== Flora and fauna ==
According to the National Biodiversity Information System of Comisión Nacional para el Conocimiento y Uso de la Biodiversidad (CONABIO) in Bavispe Flora and Fauna Protection Area there are over 1,040 plant and animal species from which 50 are in at risk category and 23 are exotics.

Pine–oak forest is the main plant community in the region. Characteristic species include the oaks Quercus viminea and Quercus mcvaughii, the conifers Pinus strobiformis and Abies concolor, maguey de colibrí (Agave polianthiflora), and Amoreuxia palmatifida.

Native mammals include jaguar (Panthera onca), puma (Puma concolor) American black bear (Ursus americanus), ocelot (Leopardus pardalis), coyote (Canis latrans), gray fox (Urocyon cinereoargenteus), desert mule deer (Odocoileus hemionus eremicus), white-tailed deer (Odocoileus virginianus), collared peccary (Pecari tajacu), pronghorn (Antilocapra americana), North American beaver (Castor canadensis), North American porcupine (Erethizon dorsatum), neotropical river otter (Lutra longicaudis), black-tailed prairie dog (Cynomys ludovicianus), and silver-haired bat (Lasionycteris noctivagans).

Native birds include golden eagle (Aquila chrysaetos), aplomado falcon (Falco femoralis), elegant trogon (Trogon elegans), acorn woodpecker (Melanerpes formicivorus), Montezuma quail (Cyrtonyx montezumae), Mexican jay (Aphelocoma wollweberi), military macaw (Ara militaris), and thick-billed parrot (Rhynchopsitta pachyrhyncha).

Reptiles and amphibians include the desert box turtle (Terrapene ornata), boa constrictor (Boa constrictor), Western diamondback rattlesnake (Crotalus atrox), mountain spiny lizard (Sceloporus jarrovii), western narrow-mouthed toad (Gastrophryne olivacea), and Tarahumara salamander (Ambystoma rosaceum rosaceum).

Native fish include the Yaquí catfish (Ictalurus pricei).

== History ==
The area first decreed a reserve in 1936 by President Lázaro Cárdenas, and amended in 1939 to cover its current extent. It was known until 2017 as Ajos-Bavispe National Forest Reserve and Wildlife Refuge, when it was re-designated a flora and fauna protection area.
