= Quercus radiata =

Conservation status
- Endangered (IUCN 3.1)

Scientific classification
- Kingdom: Plantae
- Clade: Embryophytes
- Clade: Tracheophytes
- Clade: Spermatophytes
- Clade: Angiosperms
- Clade: Eudicots
- Clade: Rosids
- Order: Fagales
- Family: Fagaceae
- Genus: Quercus
- Subgenus: Quercus subg. Quercus
- Section: Quercus sect. Lobatae
- Species: Q. radiata

Binomial name
- Quercus radiata Trel.

Species of oak tree

Quercus radiata is an endangered species of oak native to Mexico.

== Description ==
Quercus radiata is a small evergreen tree that typically reaches 4 to 9 metres (13 to 30 feet) in height.

== Distribution and habitat ==
It is native to the southern Sierra Madre Occidental, including southern Durango, eastern Nayarit, western Zacatecas, and northern Jalisco. Its extent of occurrence is 13,000 square kilometres (5,000 square miles), with a low density within that range and an estimated area of occupancy between 64 and 375 km^{2} (25 and 145 sq mi).

It is found on thin igneous soils and rocky outcrops between 2,000 and 2,600 m (6,600 and 8,500 ft) in elevation, where it form open stands with Pinus lumholtzii and other oaks and pines.

Its range is mostly outside protected areas and subject habitat degradation from timber harvesting and encroachment by roads and agriculture.
