= Quercus striatula =

Conservation status
- Least Concern (IUCN 3.1)

Scientific classification
- Kingdom: Plantae
- Clade: Embryophytes
- Clade: Tracheophytes
- Clade: Spermatophytes
- Clade: Angiosperms
- Clade: Eudicots
- Clade: Rosids
- Order: Fagales
- Family: Fagaceae
- Genus: Quercus
- Subgenus: Quercus subg. Quercus
- Section: Quercus sect. Quercus
- Species: Q. striatula

Binomial name
- Quercus striatula Trel.

Synonyms
- Quercus cordifolia Trel.

Species of oak tree

Quercus striatula is a species of oak native to Mexico.

== Description ==
Quercus striatula is low shrub, which spreads by rhizomes. It can form a low, dense thicket up to .4 metres (1 1/2 feet) high.

== Distribution and habitat ==
It is native to the Sierra Madre Occidental of Chihuahua, Durango, Aguascalientes, and Zacatecas, and several mountain ranges on the Mexican Plateau to the east of the Siera, including mountains in Zacatecas, San Luis Potosí, and Guanajuato.

Quercus striatula is an understory plant in pine and pine–oak forests between 1,954 and 2,723 m (6,411 and 8,934 ft) in elevation.

== Ecology ==
The species grows in areas that have been cleared of understory vegetation by fires. It is generally found under the pines Pinus cooperi, P. teocote, P. leiophylla, and/or the oak Quercus sideroxyla. It is associated with Pinus cembroides and Mimosa aculeaticarpa var. biuncifera in drier areas of the mountains.
