= Quercus carmenensis =

Conservation status
- Endangered (IUCN 3.1)

Scientific classification
- Kingdom: Plantae
- Clade: Embryophytes
- Clade: Tracheophytes
- Clade: Spermatophytes
- Clade: Angiosperms
- Clade: Eudicots
- Clade: Rosids
- Order: Fagales
- Family: Fagaceae
- Genus: Quercus
- Subgenus: Quercus subg. Quercus
- Section: Quercus sect. Quercus
- Species: Q. carmenensis

Binomial name
- Quercus carmenensis C.H.Mull.

Species of tree

Quercus carmenensis, the Mexican oak, is a tree species native to Brewster County, Texas, and Coahuila, Mexico. It grows in pine-oak forests at elevations of 1,500–1,950 metres (4,920–6,400 feet). It is a deciduous species with gray bark and red twigs. The leaves are lanceolate with irregular lobing along the margins.
