= Quercus deliquescens =

Conservation status
- Data Deficient (IUCN 3.1)

Scientific classification
- Kingdom: Plantae
- Clade: Embryophytes
- Clade: Tracheophytes
- Clade: Spermatophytes
- Clade: Angiosperms
- Clade: Eudicots
- Clade: Rosids
- Order: Fagales
- Family: Fagaceae
- Genus: Quercus
- Subgenus: Quercus subg. Quercus
- Section: Quercus sect. Quercus
- Species: Q. deliquescens

Binomial name
- Quercus deliquescens C.H.Mull.

Species of oak tree

Quercus deliquescens is a species of oak tree in the family Fagaceae, native to northeast Mexico. It is placed in section Quercus.

== Distribution ==
The tree is endemic to Chihuahua state of Mexico.

It is known only from one population system in the valley of Río Conchos and north along the Río Grande. It grows in dry montane scrub habitats, and the dense scrublands that cover northern Mexico.

It is an IUCN Red List Vulnerable species, threatened by habitat loss.

== See also ==
- Endemic flora of Mexico

== Sources ==
- Current IUCN Red List of all Threatened Species
