= Quercus subspathulata =

Conservation status
- Least Concern (IUCN 3.1)

Scientific classification
- Kingdom: Plantae
- Clade: Embryophytes
- Clade: Tracheophytes
- Clade: Spermatophytes
- Clade: Angiosperms
- Clade: Eudicots
- Clade: Rosids
- Order: Fagales
- Family: Fagaceae
- Genus: Quercus
- Subgenus: Quercus subg. Quercus
- Section: Quercus sect. Quercus
- Species: Q. subspathulata

Binomial name
- Quercus subspathulata Trel.

Synonyms
- Quercus pallidifolia C.H.Mull.

Species of oak tree

Quercus subspathulata is a Mexican species of oak in the family Fagaceae. It is native to western Mexico, found in the States of Durango, Jalisco, Nayarit, and Sinaloa. It is a white oak, placed in Quercus section Quercus.

Quercus subspathulata is a small tree up to 10 metres (33 feet) tall with a trunk as much as 40 centimetres (16 inches) in diameter. The leaves can be up to 22 cm (8 3/4 in) long, and green on the top but whitish on the underside.
