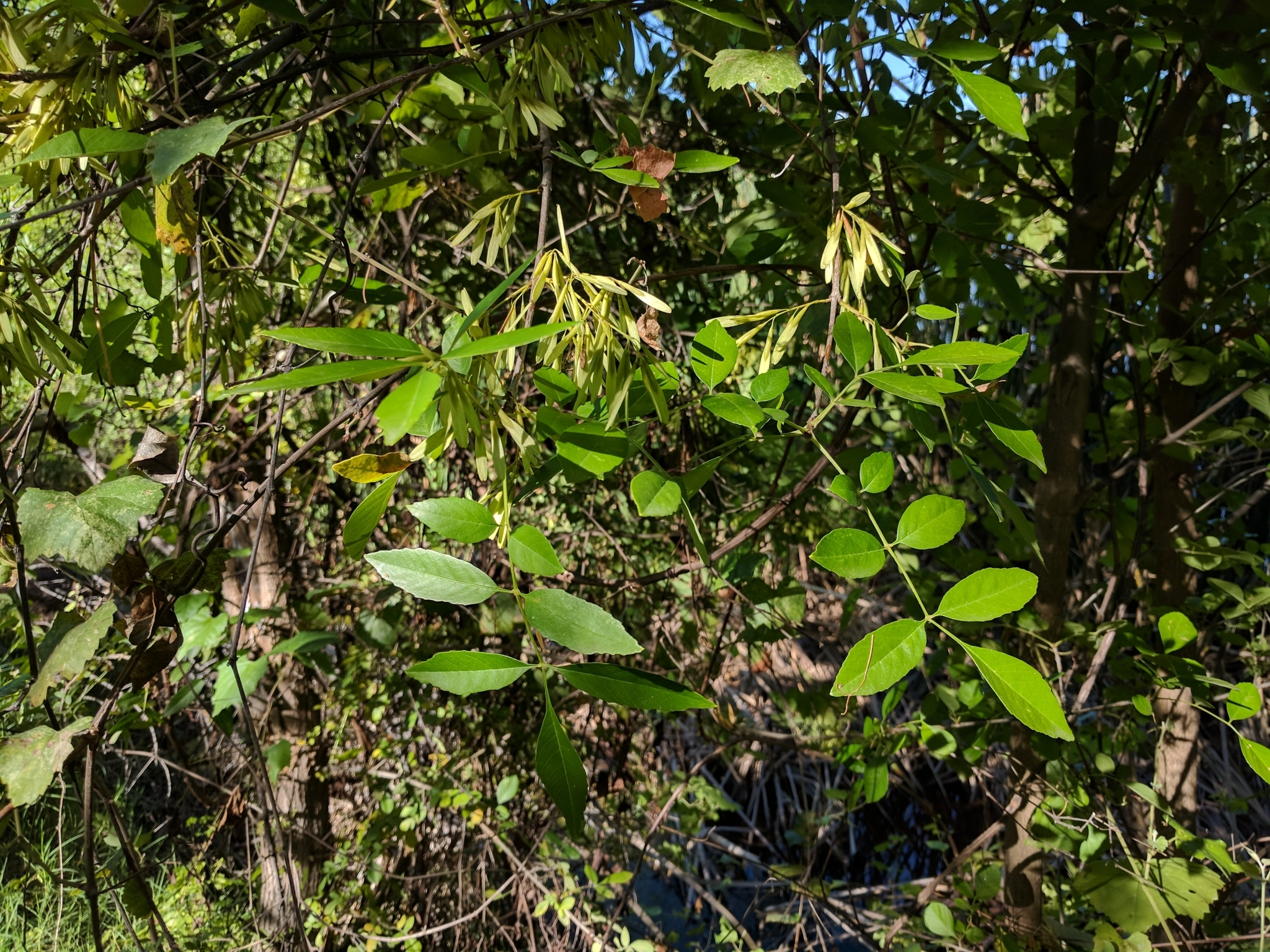

Conservation status
- Least Concern (IUCN 3.1)

Scientific classification
- Kingdom: Plantae
- Clade: Tracheophytes
- Clade: Angiosperms
- Clade: Eudicots
- Clade: Asterids
- Order: Lamiales
- Family: Oleaceae
- Genus: Fraxinus
- Section: Fraxinus sect. Pauciflorae
- Species: F. gooddingii

Binomial name
- Fraxinus gooddingii Little

= Fraxinus gooddingii =

Species of flowering plant

Fraxinus gooddingii, the Tiburón ash or Goodding's ash, is a tree native to Sonora and southern Arizona. It is reported from Cochise and Santa Cruz Counties in Arizona, and from numerous locations in Sonora (including Isla Tiburón, Shark Island in the Gulf of California).
