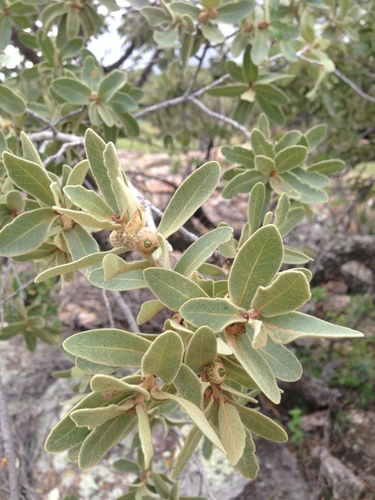

Conservation status
- Least Concern (IUCN 3.1)

Scientific classification
- Kingdom: Plantae
- Clade: Embryophytes
- Clade: Tracheophytes
- Clade: Spermatophytes
- Clade: Angiosperms
- Clade: Eudicots
- Clade: Rosids
- Order: Fagales
- Family: Fagaceae
- Genus: Quercus
- Subgenus: Quercus subg. Quercus
- Section: Quercus sect. Quercus
- Species: Q. chihuahuensis

Binomial name
- Quercus chihuahuensis Trel.

Synonyms
- Quercus chihuahuensis f. amplifolia Trel.; Quercus chihuahuensis f. microphylloides Trel.; Quercus chihuahuensis f. tenuis Trel.; Quercus infralutea Trel.; Quercus jaliscensis Trel.; Quercus santaclarensis C. H. Muller

= Quercus chihuahuensis =

Species of oak tree

Quercus chihuahuensis, the Chihuahua oak, is a species of oak in the beech family. It is native to the region from extreme western Texas west to Sonora, Mexico, and south to Zacatecas and San Luis Potosí. It grows mostly at mid elevations, from 400–2,000 metres (1,300–6,600 feet) above sea level, in forests mixed with various pines and other oaks. It is one of the dominant species of the Sierra Madre Occidental in Chihuahua and Sonora.

The tree grows up to 10 m (33 ft) tall, very common in much of its range. The leaves are entire to toothed or sublobate, green on the top but yellow or gray on the underside because of a coating of velvety, stellate (star-shaped, highly branched) hairs. The species is related to Quercus arizonica and Quercus grisea, sometimes hybridizing with these two species in Texas.
