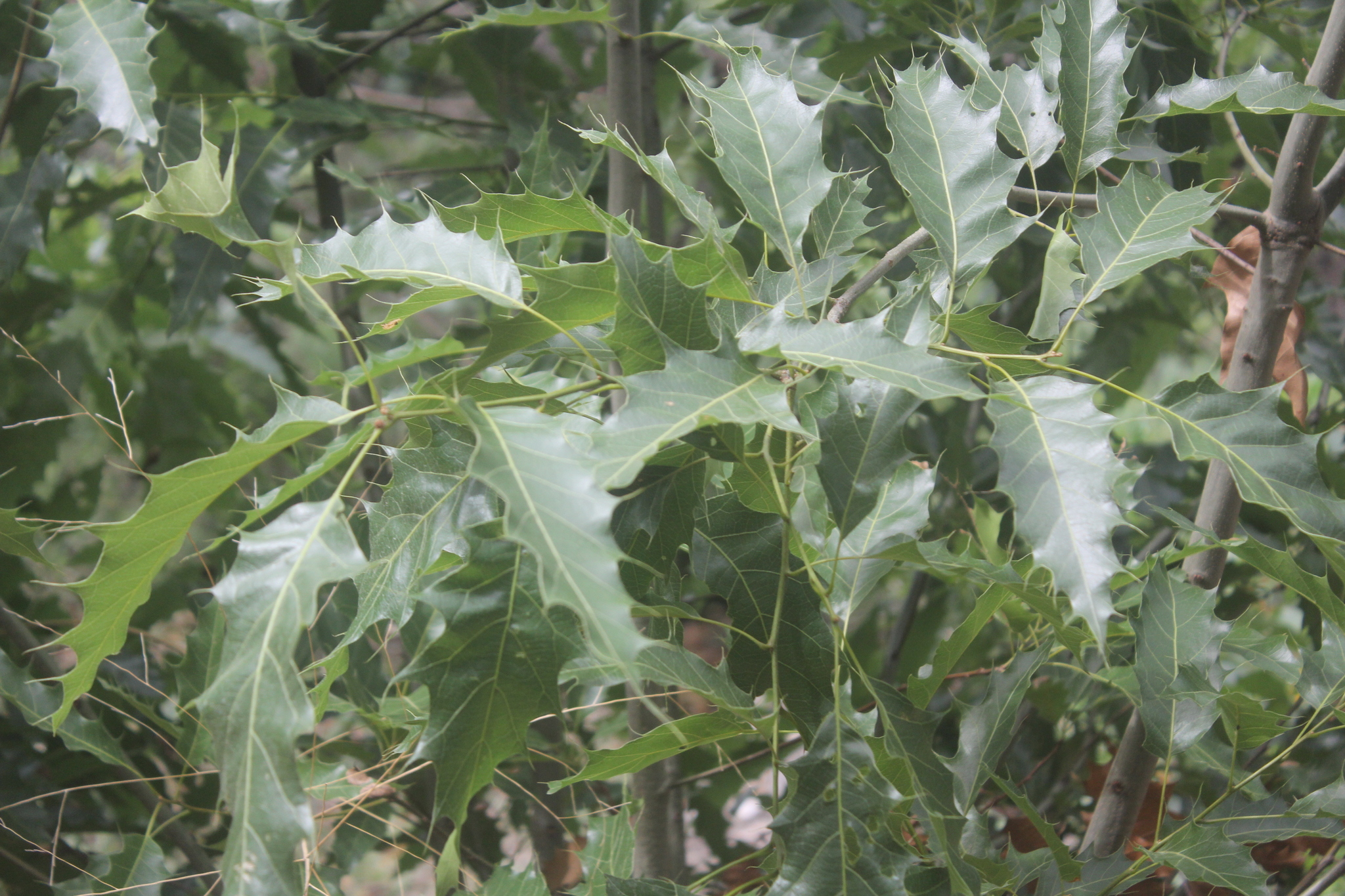

Conservation status
- Least Concern (IUCN 3.1)

Scientific classification
- Kingdom: Plantae
- Clade: Tracheophytes
- Clade: Angiosperms
- Clade: Eudicots
- Clade: Rosids
- Order: Fagales
- Family: Fagaceae
- Genus: Quercus
- Subgenus: Quercus subg. Quercus
- Section: Quercus sect. Lobatae
- Species: Q. albocincta

Binomial name
- Quercus albocincta Trel.

Synonyms
- Quercus acutifolia var. albocincta Zavala-Chàvez

= Quercus albocincta =

Species of oak tree

Quercus albocincta is a species of oak tree. It is native to the Sierra Madre Occidental of western Mexico, in the states of Sonora, Chihuahua, Durango, and Sinaloa. It has also been found in the southernmost part of Baja California Sur.

It is a deciduous tree growing to about 15 metres (49 feet) in height with a trunk 25–50 centimetres (10–19 1/2 inches) in diameter. The leaves are stiff and leathery, elliptical or slightly egg-shaped, up to 16 cm (6 1/2 in) long, with 3–6 pairs of large bristle-tipped teeth along the edges.
