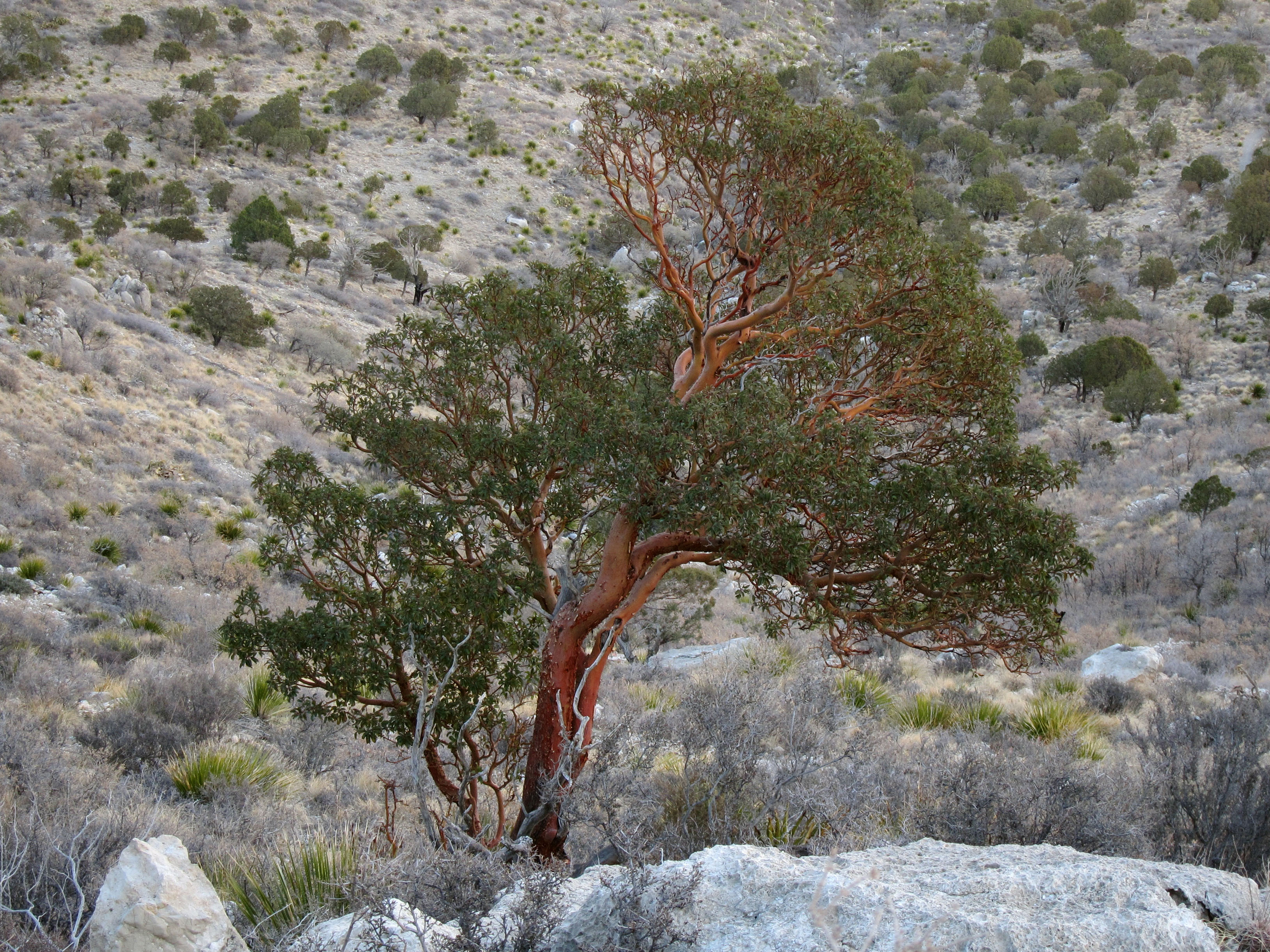

Conservation status
- Least Concern (IUCN 3.1)

Scientific classification
- Kingdom: Plantae
- Clade: Embryophytes
- Clade: Tracheophytes
- Clade: Angiosperms
- Clade: Eudicots
- Clade: Asterids
- Order: Ericales
- Family: Ericaceae
- Genus: Arbutus
- Species: A. xalapensis

Binomial name
- Arbutus xalapensis Kunth 1819 not Hook. 1836

Synonyms
- Synonymy: Arbutus densiflora Kunth; Arbutus densiflora Benth.; Arbutus densiflora var. petiolaris (Kunth) Loes.; Arbutus donnell-smithii Small; Arbutus floribunda M.Martens & Galeotti; Arbutus glandulosa M.Martens & Galeotti; Arbutus laurifolia Lindl.; Arbutus laurina M.Martens & Galeotti; Arbutus macrophylla M.Martens & Galeotti; Arbutus mollis Kunth; Arbutus paniculata M.Martens & Galeotti; Arbutus peninsularis Rose & Goldman; Arbutus petiolaris Kunth; Arbutus prunifolia Klotzsch; Arbutus rubescens Bertol.; Arbutus texana Buckley; Arbutus varians Benth.; Arbutus villosa Willd. ex Klotzsch; Arbutus xalapensis var. pubescens Benth.; Arbutus xalapensis var. texana A.Gray; Arbutus xalapensis subsp. texana (Buckley) A.E.Murray; Arctostaphylos rubescens (Bertol.) Hemsl.; Comarostaphylis glauca Buckley; Comarostaphylis rubescens (Bertol.) Klotzsch

= Arbutus xalapensis =

Species of flowering plant

Arbutus xalapensis, commonly known as the Texas madrone, Amazaquitl, or Texas madroño, is a species of flowering plant in the heather family. It is native to Central America, the southwestern United States (western Texas and New Mexico), and throughout Mexico. It is found in canyons and mountains, on rocky plains, and in oak woodlands, at altitudes of up to 3,000 m (9,800 ft) in the south of the range, but lower, down to 600 m (2,000 ft) in the north of the range.

Arbutus xalapensis is a large shrub or small to medium-sized evergreen tree growing to 5–25 meters (16–82 ft) tall with a trunk up to 50 cm (20 in) in diameter, with smooth orange-brown bark peeling in thin sheets. The size varies regionally with available rainfall, with small, shrubby plants in dry areas such as western Texas and New Mexico, and larger trees in moister areas of Mexico; plants in Texas, New Mexico, and the far northeast of Mexico are distinguished as a variety, A. xalapensis var. texana, or even a distinct species A. texana, by some botanists, but others do not regard these as distinct.

The leaves are oblong to lanceolate, 5–17 cm (2.0–6.7 in) long and 1.5–5 cm (0.59–1.97 in) broad, with an entire or serrated margin. The flowers are bell-shaped, white or pale pink, 5–10 mm long, produced in loose panicles. The fruit is a rough-surfaced red berry 1 cm (0.39 in) in diameter, reportedly edible (however, those of related species have narcotic properties), and contains numerous small seeds.

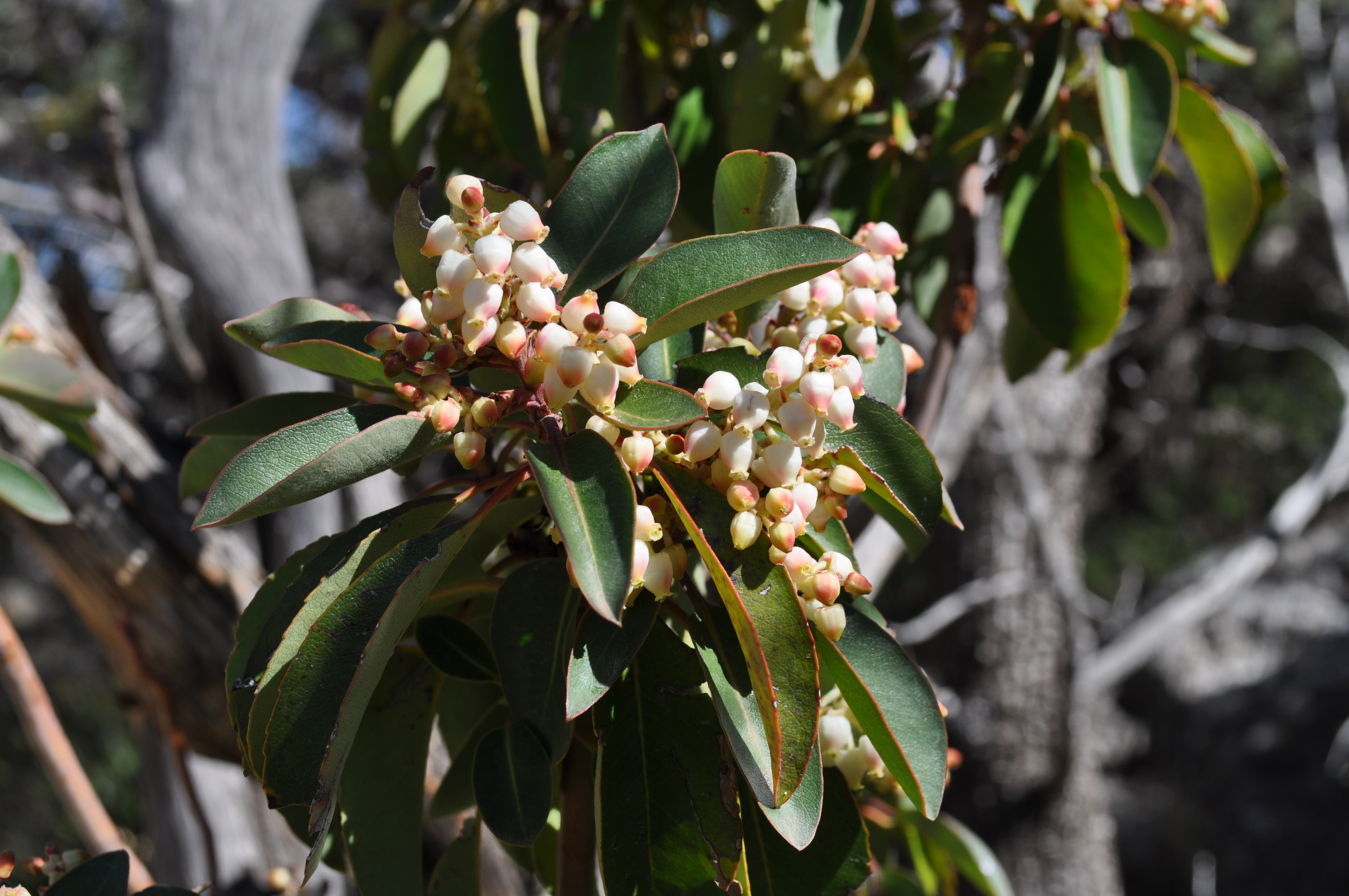
Flowers

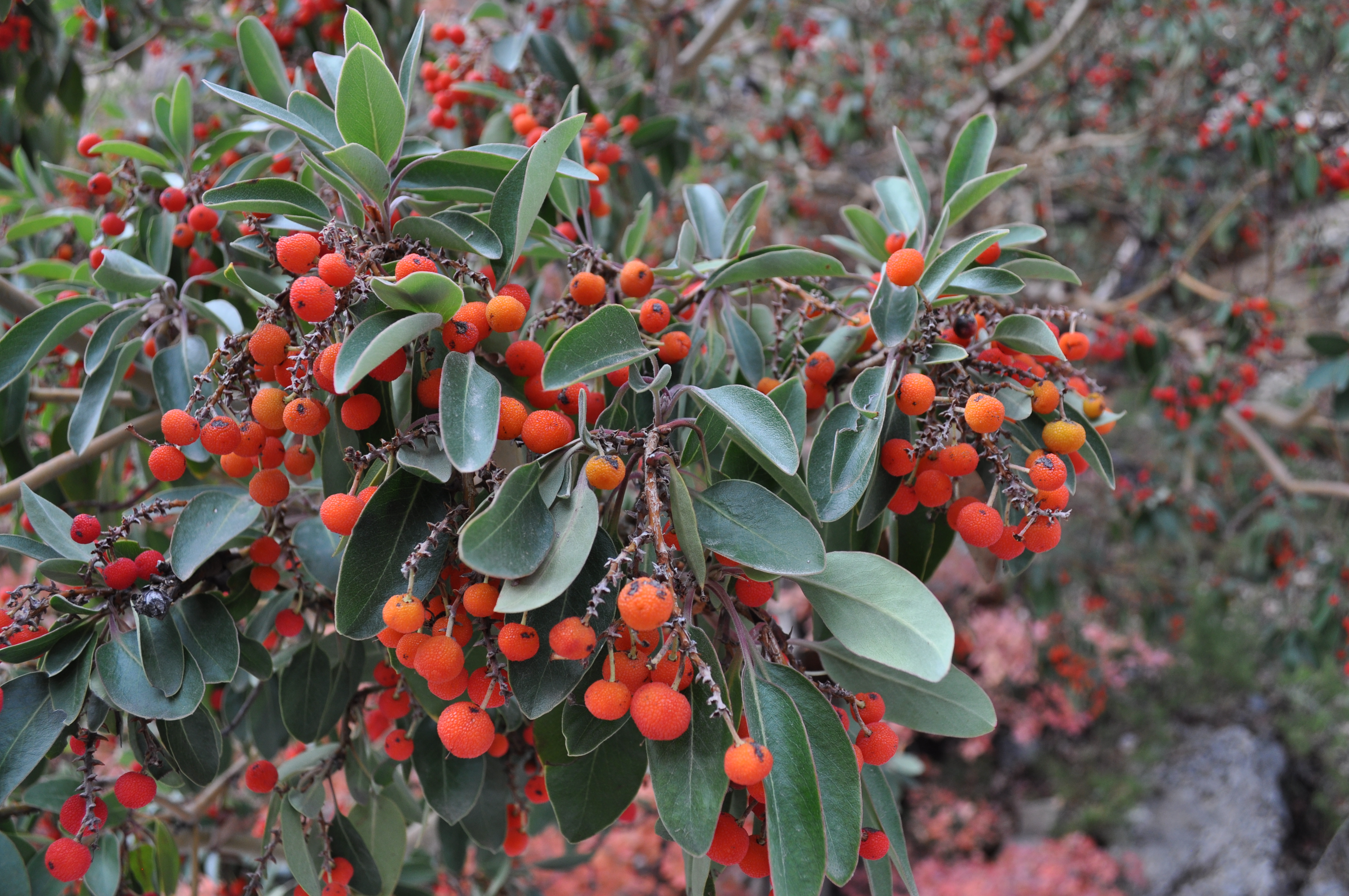
Berries

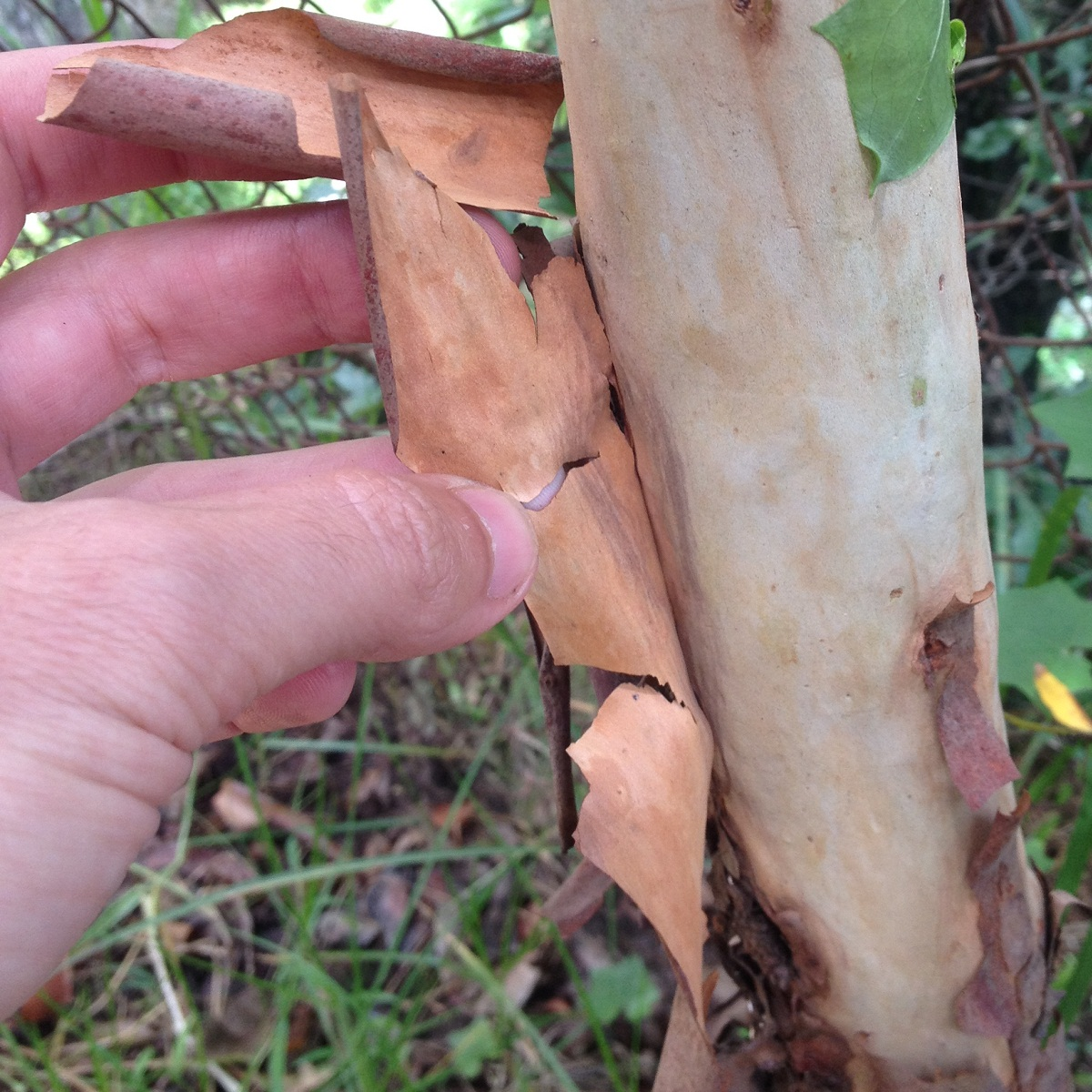
Bark
