= Quercus crassifolia =

Conservation status
- Least Concern (IUCN 3.1)

Scientific classification
- Kingdom: Plantae
- Clade: Tracheophytes
- Clade: Angiosperms
- Clade: Eudicots
- Clade: Rosids
- Order: Fagales
- Family: Fagaceae
- Genus: Quercus
- Subgenus: Quercus subg. Quercus
- Section: Quercus sect. Lobatae
- Species: Q. crassifolia

Binomial name
- Quercus crassifolia Bonpl.

Synonyms
- List: Quercus brachystachys Benth.; Quercus chicamolensis Trel.; Quercus crassifolia var. errans (Trel.) E.F.Warb.; Quercus errans Trel.; Quercus felipensis Trel.; Quercus miguelitensis Trel.; Quercus mollis M.Martens & Galeotti; Quercus moreliana Trel.; Quercus orbiculata Trel.; Quercus spinulosa M.Martens & Galeotti; Quercus splendens var. pallidior A.DC.; Quercus stipularis Bonpl.

Species of oak tree

Quercus crassifolia is a species of oak. It is widespread in Mexico from Sonora and Chihuahua to Veracruz and Chiapas. It has also been found in Guatemala.

It is a shrub or small tree sometimes reaching as much as 15 metres (49 feet) in height. The shoots are covered with many yellow or light brown branching hairs. The leaves are broadly egg-shaped with the widest part distant from the stem, up to 20 centimetres (8 inches) long, with 6–12 pointed teeth on each side. People of the region use the wood to make tool handles and farm implements.
