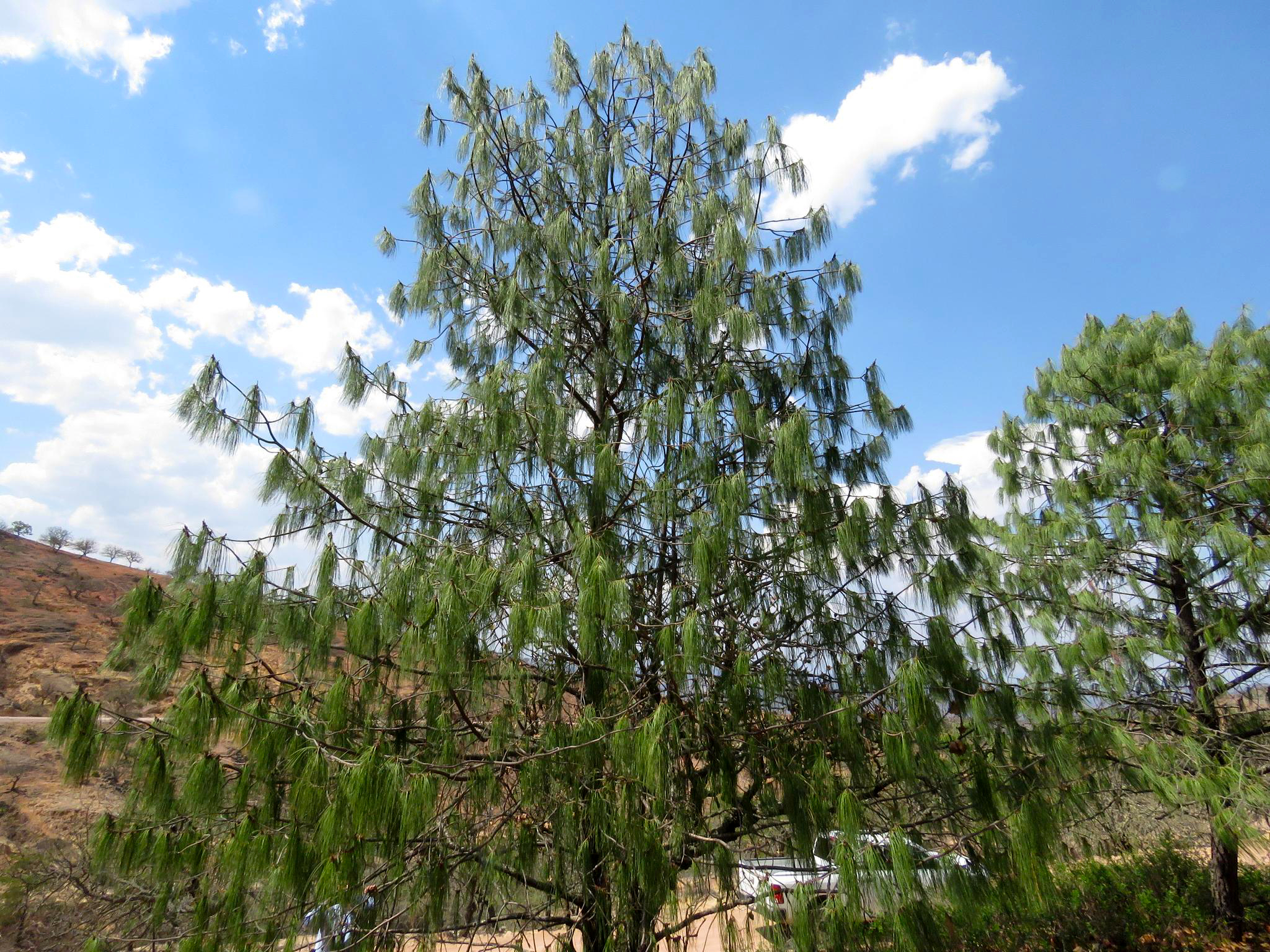
- Pinus lumholtzii in Guanajuato, Mexico

Conservation status
- Near Threatened (IUCN 3.1)

Scientific classification
- Kingdom: Plantae
- Clade: Tracheophytes
- Clade: Gymnosperms
- Division: Pinophyta
- Class: Pinopsida
- Order: Pinales
- Family: Pinaceae
- Genus: Pinus
- Subgenus: P. subg. Pinus
- Section: P. sect. Trifoliae
- Subsection: P. subsect. Australes
- Species: P. lumholtzii

Binomial name
- Pinus lumholtzii B.L.Rob. & Fernald
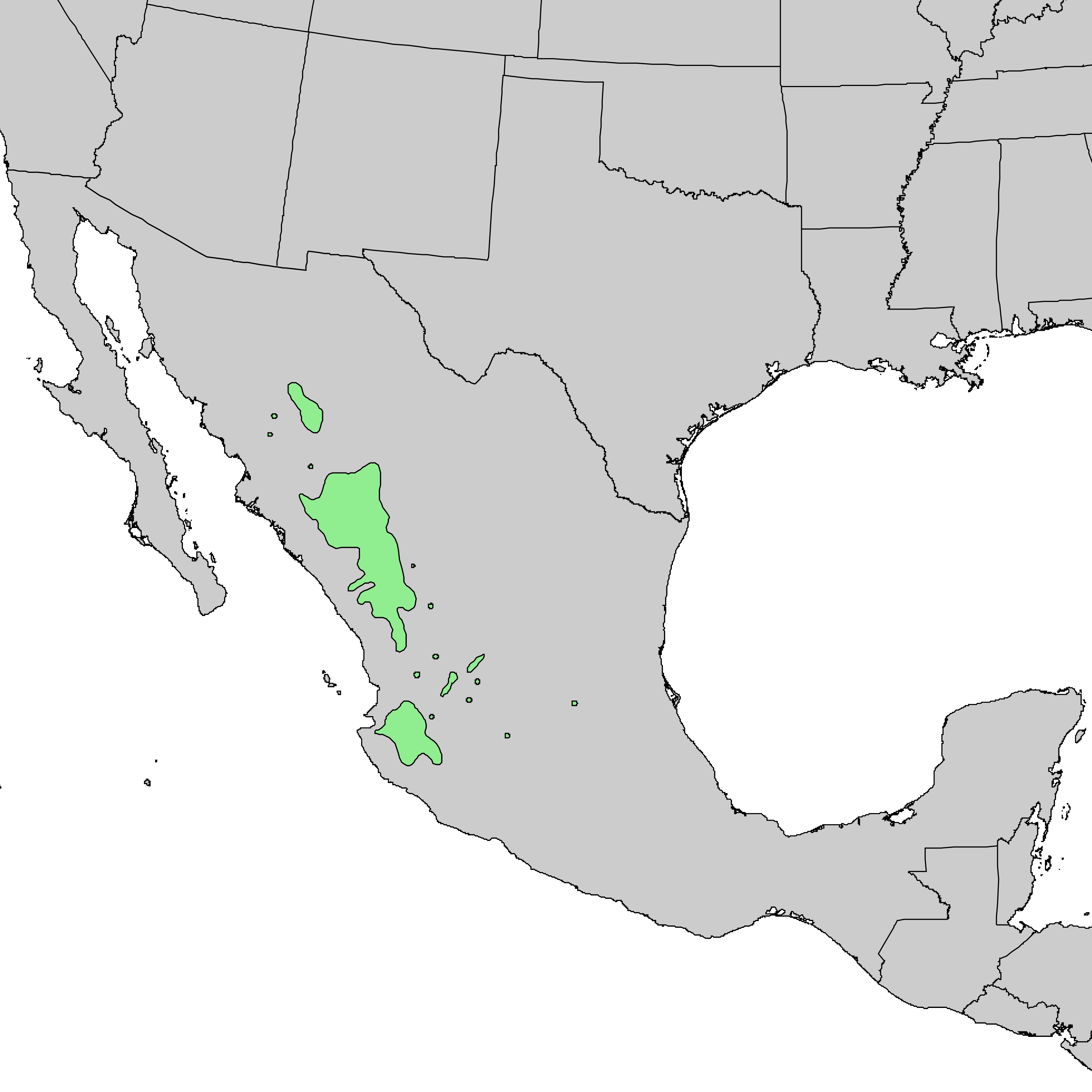
- Natural range of Pinus lumholtzii

= Pinus lumholtzii =

Species of conifer

Pinus lumholtzii, the Lumholtz's pine or pino triste ('sad pine' in Spanish), is a species of conifer in the family Pinaceae. It is a pine endemic to northwestern Mexico. It is named after Norwegian explorer Carl Sofus Lumholtz.

This pine occurs only in the states of Chihuahua, Durango, Zacatecas, Nayarit, Jalisco, Aguascalientes (29° to 22° North latitude). It grows at 1,600–3,000 metres (5,200–9,800 ft) in elevation. It grows in warm temperate and cool climates, with summer rainfall.

Pinus lumholtzii grows to 15–20 metres (49–66 ft) tall.

It is on the IUCN Red List of endangered plant species in Mexico.

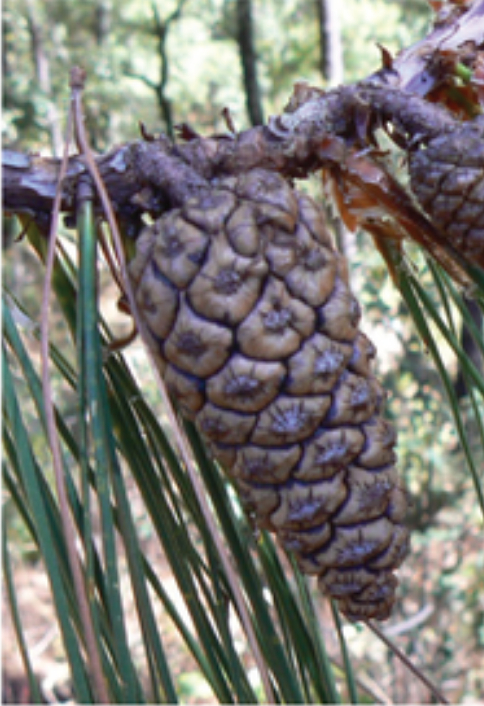
Cone

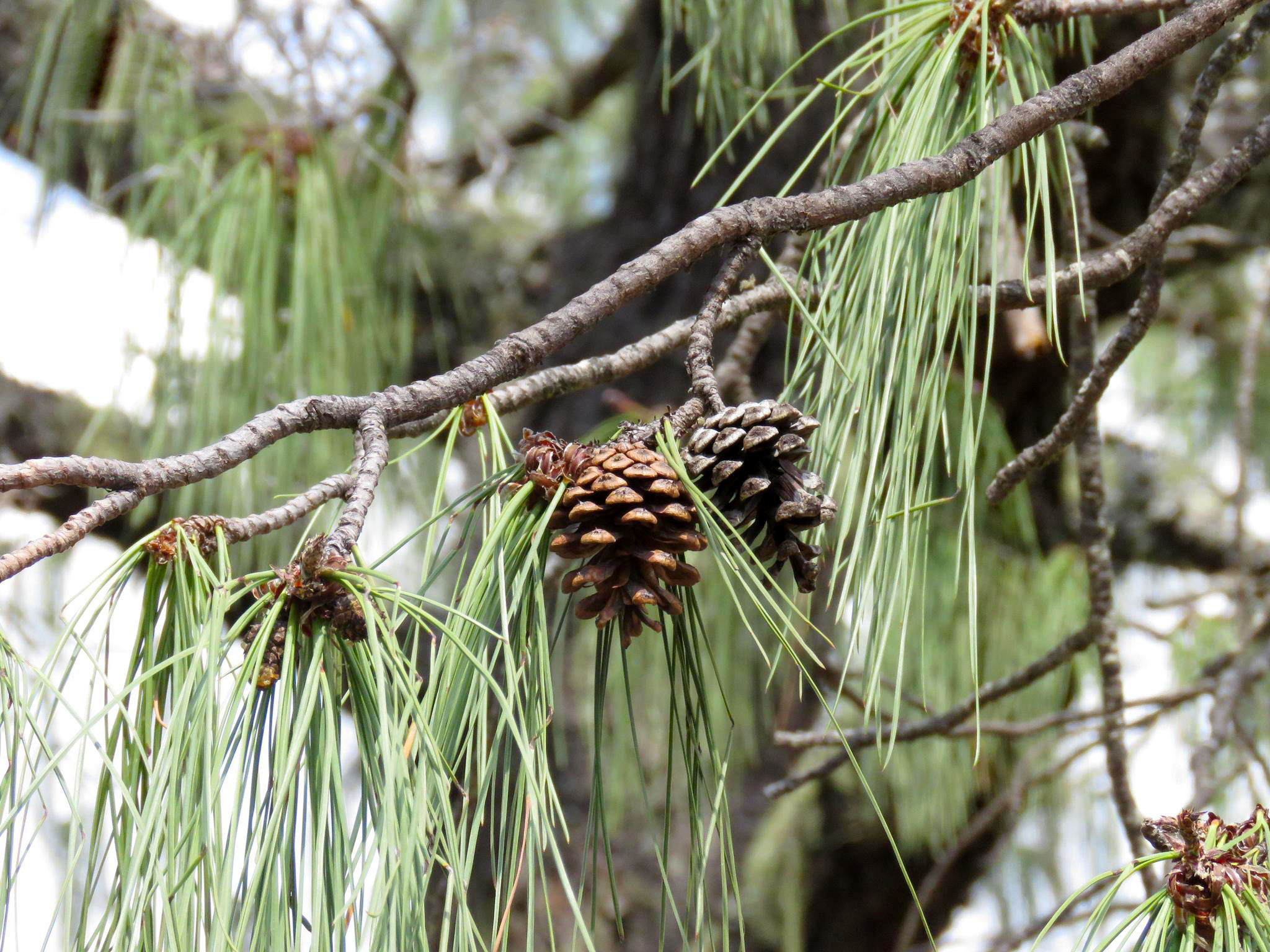
Foliage and cones, Guanajuato

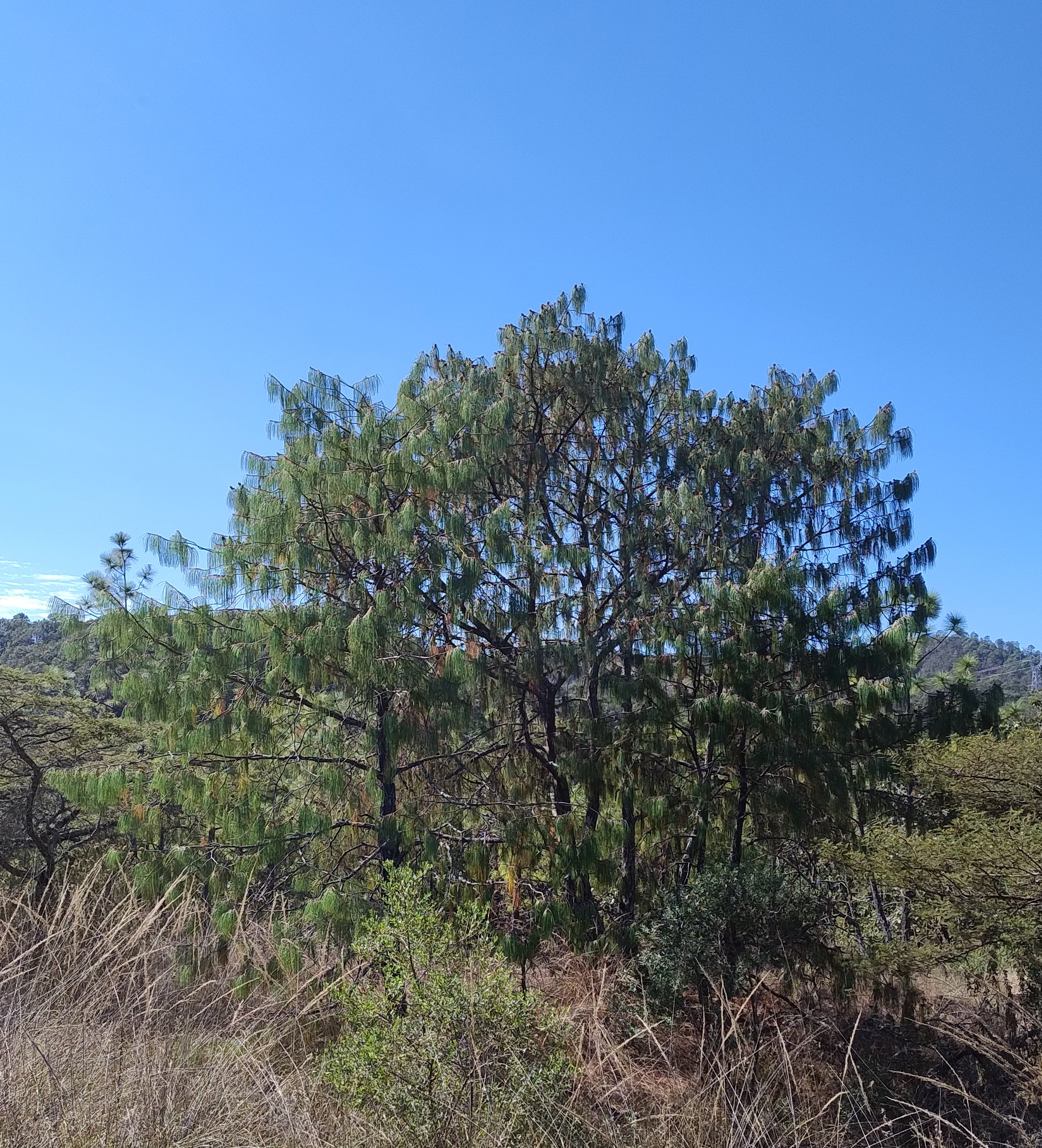
Trees, Jalisco

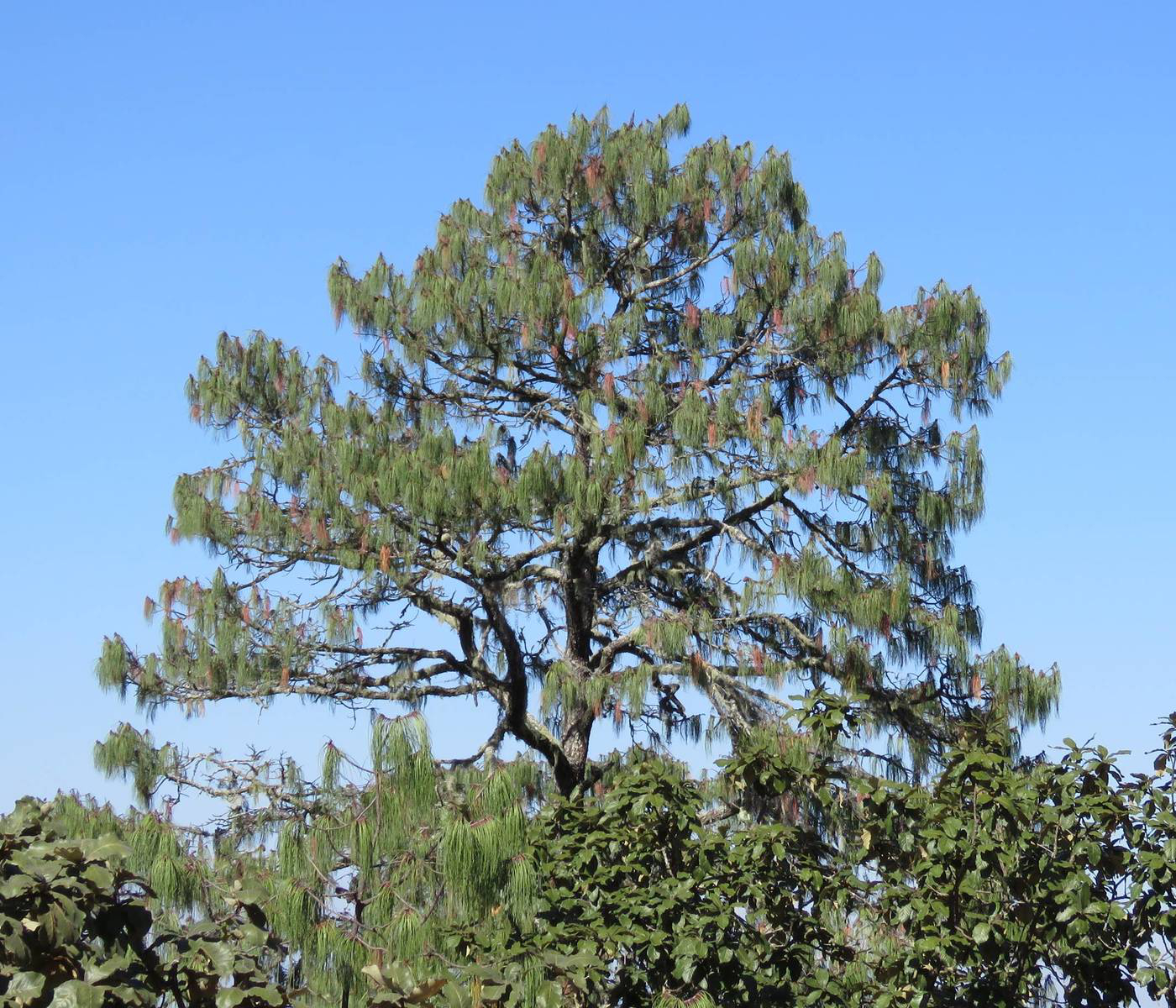
Trees, Guanajuato
