= Arizona/New Mexico Mountains ecoregion =

EPA designated area

Coordinates: 33°N 110°W

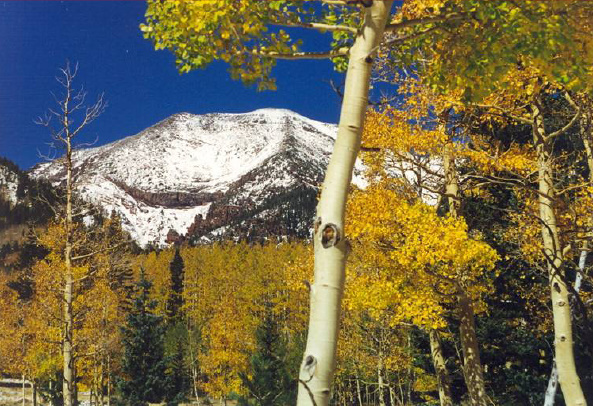
- Aspen forest below Humphreys Peak

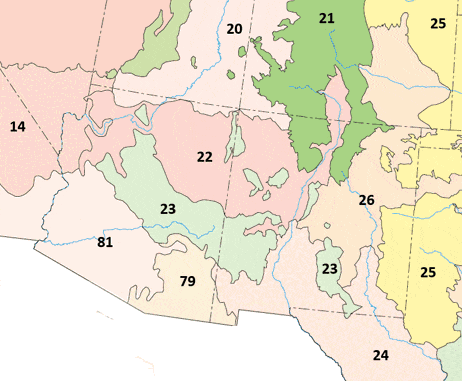
- The Arizona/New Mexico Mountains ecoregion (23)

Ecology
- Realm: Nearctic
- Biome: Temperate coniferous forests
- Borders: Colorado Plateau shrublands; Chihuahuan Desert; Sonoran Desert
- Bird species: 208
- Mammal species: 123

Geography
- Area: 109,100 km^{2} (42,100 mi^{2})
- Country: United States
- States: Arizona; New Mexico; Texas
- Rivers: Gila River

Conservation
- Habitat loss: 0.307%
- Protected: 73.78%

The Arizona/New Mexico Mountains ecoregion is a Level III ecoregion designated by the United States Environmental Protection Agency (EPA) in the U.S. states of Arizona and New Mexico, with a small extension into the Guadalupe Mountains in Texas. The World Wildlife Fund named this ecoregion Arizona Mountains forests, and classified it as a temperate coniferous forests ecoregion. The ecoregion has a rich variety of woodland habitats and wildlife.

== Setting ==
The region is a transition region from the lower elevation Sonoran Desert (81) to the southwest and Chihuahuan Desert (24) southeast; the west is bordered by the mid-elevation Mojave Desert (14).

The north is bordered by the east–west Arizona/New Mexico Plateau (22), ecoregion which is part of and is the southern region of the Colorado Plateau. The north region of the Colorado Plateau covers eastern Utah/western Colorado and is the Colorado Plateaus ecoregion (20). The extreme southern perimeter of the Colorado Plateaus ecoregion extends east–west along the border regions of Arizona-New Mexico.

The ecoregion landscape of steep mountains and high stony plateaus with rocky outcrops from the Kaibab Plateau in northern Arizona south to the Mogollon Plateau, extending eastwards into southwestern New Mexico and into the Trans-Pecos region of West Texas. Elevations range from 1,370 to 3,000 meters (4,490 to 9,840 ft), with some peaks higher than that. Specific areas include the Gila Wilderness in New Mexico.

Approximately 57.6% of this ecoregion lies within Arizona, 42.3% within New Mexico, and less than 0.1% in Texas.

== Subregions ==
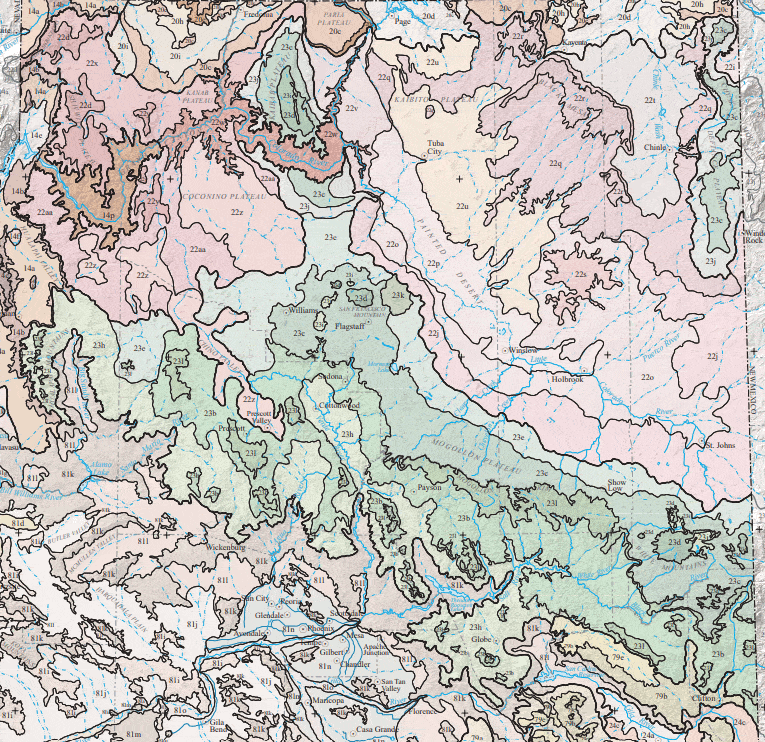
Map of ecoregion in Arizona

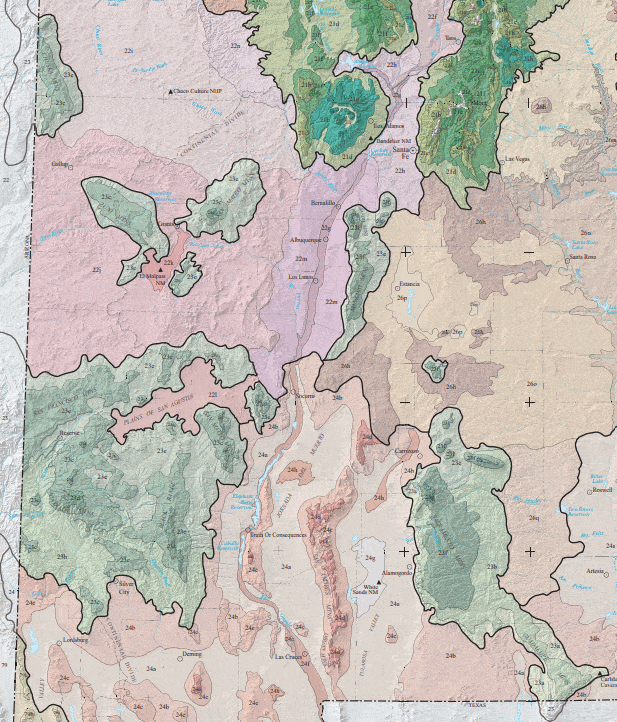
Map of ecoregion in New Mexico

This ecoregion spans the mountains of Arizona and New Mexico, and has a number of subregions, described below.

=== Chihuahuan Desert Slopes (23a) ===
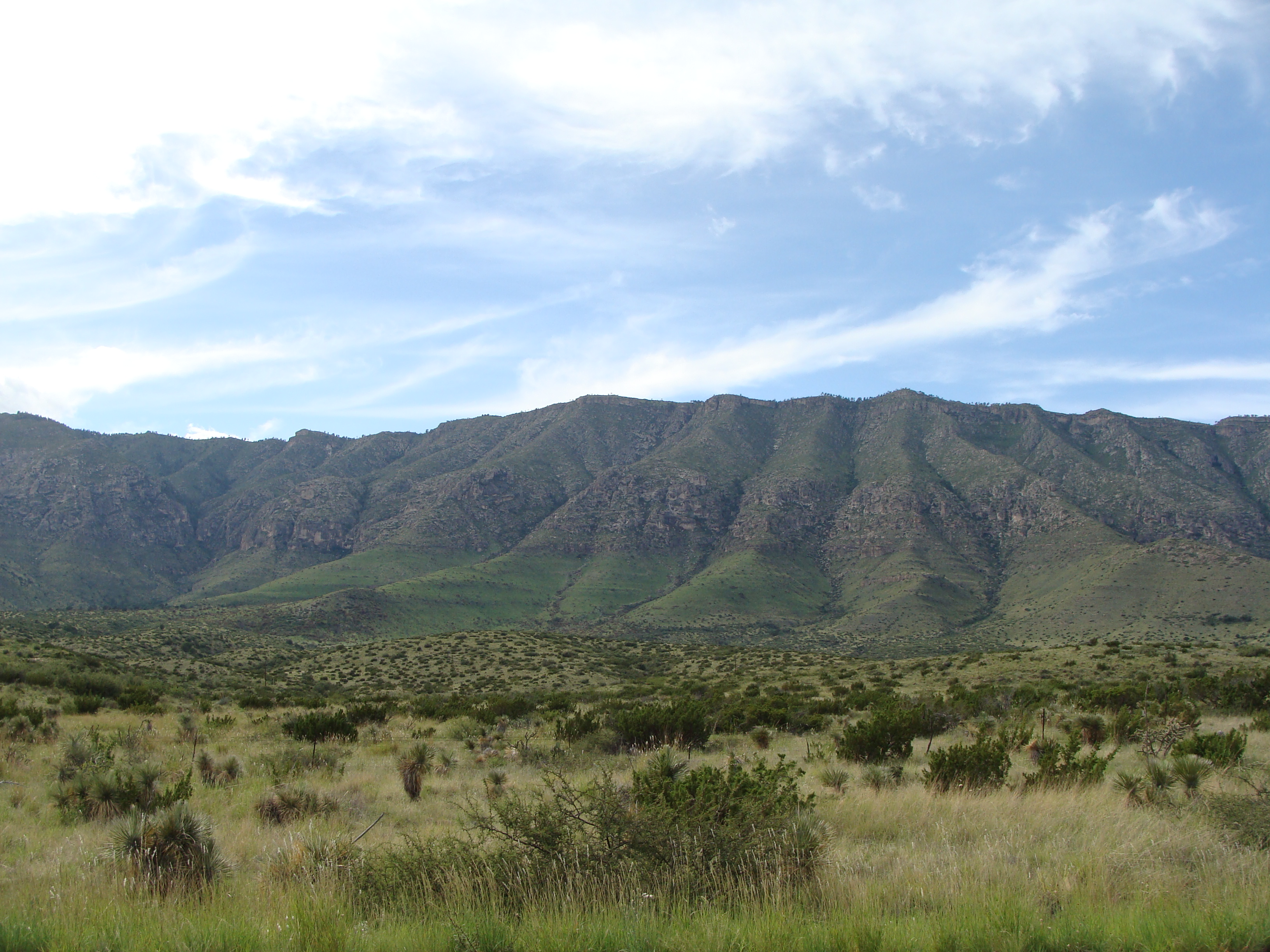
Surroundings near the Guadalupe Mountains. Roughly corresponds to region 23a.

The Chihuahuan Desert Slopes are found on the Guadalupe and Sacramento Mountains. The lower slopes of these mountains represent a continuation of the Chihuahuan Desert ecosystem; soils and vegetation in much of ecoregion 23a are similar to those in the low mountains and bajadas of the Chihuahuan Deserts. The lower slopes were once mostly grasslands overgrazed in the late 19th century and subsequently invaded by desert shrubs. Yucca, sotol, lechuguilla, ocotillo, and cacti now dominate the rocky slopes below 5,500 feet (1,700 m). Grasslands persist near alluvial fans and on gentle slopes with deeper, sandstone-derived soils. Water is scarce; the few streams that originate from springs at higher elevations do not persist beyond the mouths of major canyons.

=== Madrean Lower Montane Woodlands (23b) ===
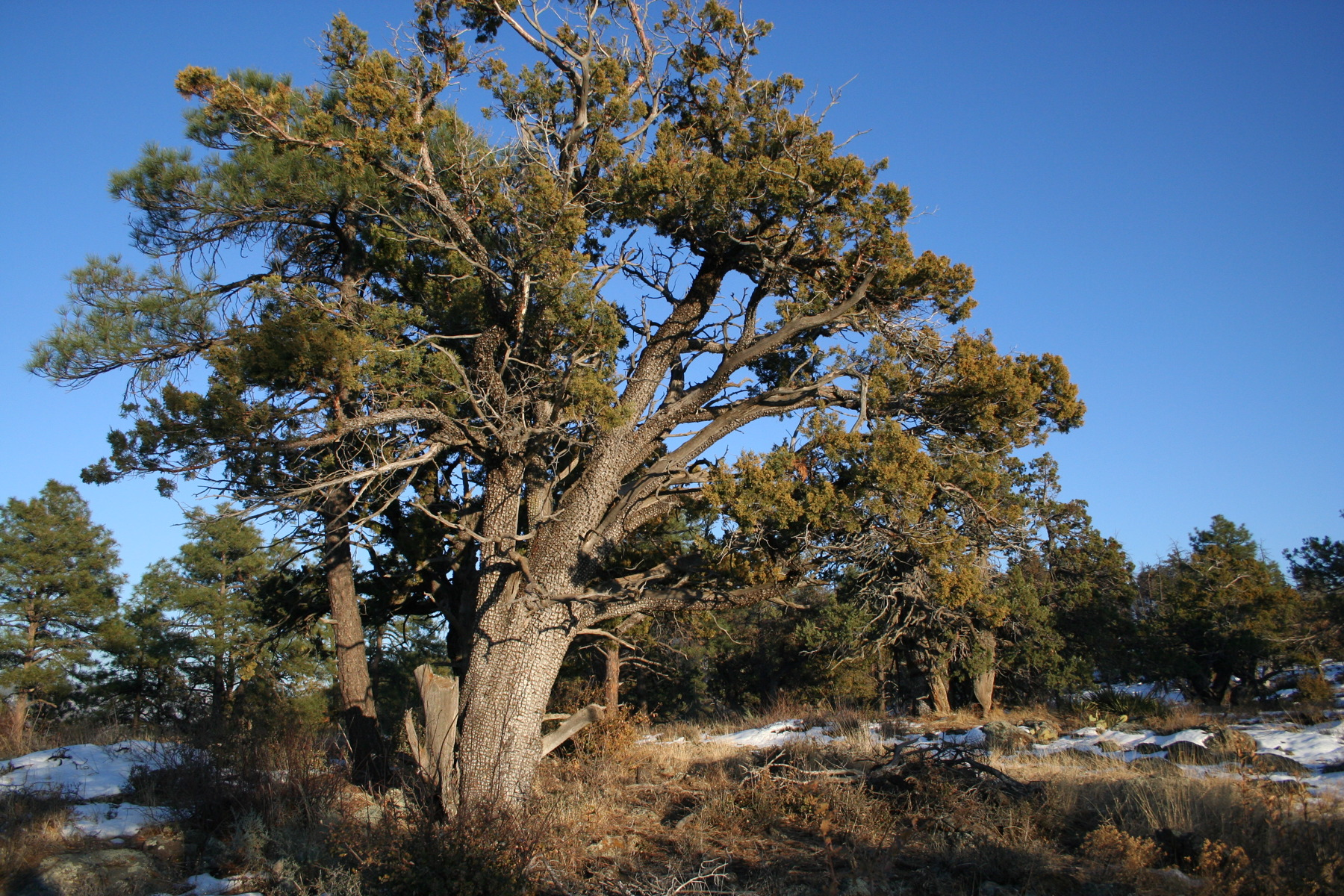
Juniperus deppeana near the Mogollon Rim

The Madrean Lower Montane Woodlands ecoregion covers the slopes of the Guadalupe, Sacramento, Mimbres, Big Burro, and Mogollon Mountains, extending into the Mogollon Transition/Mogollon Rim in Arizona. In addition to those locations, milder areas below about 7,200 feet elevation on the west sides of the Sandia and Manzano mountains, plus similar elevations in the southern Jemez Mountains south of White Rock Canyon, better fit the EPA Ecoregion description for ecoregion 23b than they do 23e. The ecoregion generally lies between 5,500 to 7,200 feet (1,700 to 2,200 m) in New Mexico and 4,200 to 7,000 feet (1,300 to 2,100 m) in Arizona, with densities of juniper, pinyon pine, and oak varying according to aspect. There are some similarities to ecoregion 23e; however, this has milder winters, wetter summers, and inclusions of alligator juniper and Madrean evergreen oak species, such as Gray and Emory oak. At middle elevations, dense thickets of shrubs such as desert ceanothus, alderleaf mountain mahogany, turbinella oak, manzanitas, and catclaw mimosa form chaparral communities. Other areas are grassy and park-like with mixed gramas and scattered trees. A few small areas of ponderosa pine, Douglas-fir, or southwestern white pine occur at the highest elevations, outliers of ecoregions 23c or 23f. The Arizona sycamore is also known from western portions of this ecoregion. In the west, the Gila River and tributaries have many endemic aquatic organisms including fish, amphibians, and insects.

=== Montane Conifer Forests (23c) ===
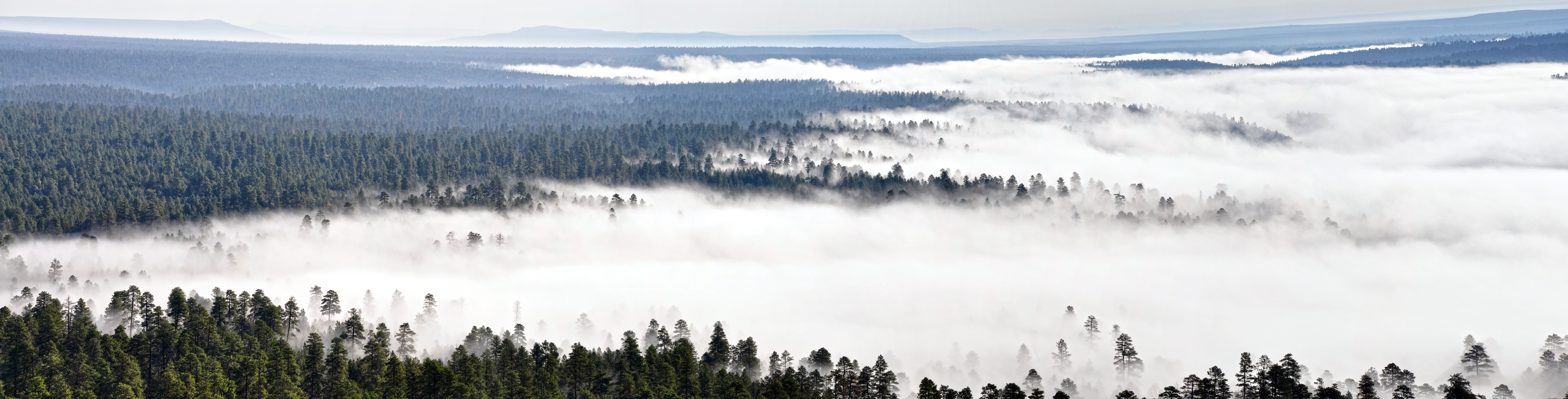
Forest atop the Mogollon Plateau above the Mogollon Rim in Arizona. The elevation in this area is typically between 6,500 and 8,500 feet (2,000 and 2,600 m). This area generally coincides with ecoregion 23c.

The Montane Conifer Forests are found west of the Rio Grande at elevations from about 7,000 to 9,500 feet (2,100 to 2,900 m). Ponderosa pine and Gambel oak are common, along with mountain mahogany and serviceberry. Some Douglas-fir, southwestern white pine, and white fir occur in a few areas. Blue spruce may occasionally be found in cool, moist canyons. The influence of the Sierra Madre flora is seen mostly in the southern mountains and diminishes to the north. In the far south, other oaks appear, such as silverleaf oak, netleaf oak, Arizona white oak, and Emory oak. The summer rains are especially important for herbaceous plants. The region is geologically diverse with volcanic, sedimentary, and some intrusive and crystalline rocks. Endemic Gila trout occur in some of the region's streams. Livestock grazing, logging, and recreation are the primary land uses. Wildfire is an important feature influencing the forested ecosystems in this region.

=== Arizona/New Mexico Subalpine Forests (23d) ===
The Arizona/New Mexico Subalpine Forests occur west of the Rio Grande at the higher elevations, generally above 9,500 feet (2,900 m). The region includes parts of the Mogollon Mountains, Black Range, San Mateo Mountains, Magdalena Mountains, and Mount Taylor. In Arizona this region encompasses higher elevations in the San Francisco Peaks, White Mountains (Arizona), Kendrick Peak, Kaibab Plateau, and Escudilla Mountain. The peak elevations are mostly above 10,000 feet (3,000 m). Although there are some vegetational differences from mountain range to mountain range within this ecoregion, the major forest trees include Engelmann spruce, corkbark fir, blue spruce, white fir, and aspen. Some Douglas-fir occurs at lower elevations. The ecoregion has a mixed geology of mostly Tertiary volcanics and intrusives, with only minor areas of Precambrian rocks in the Black Range.

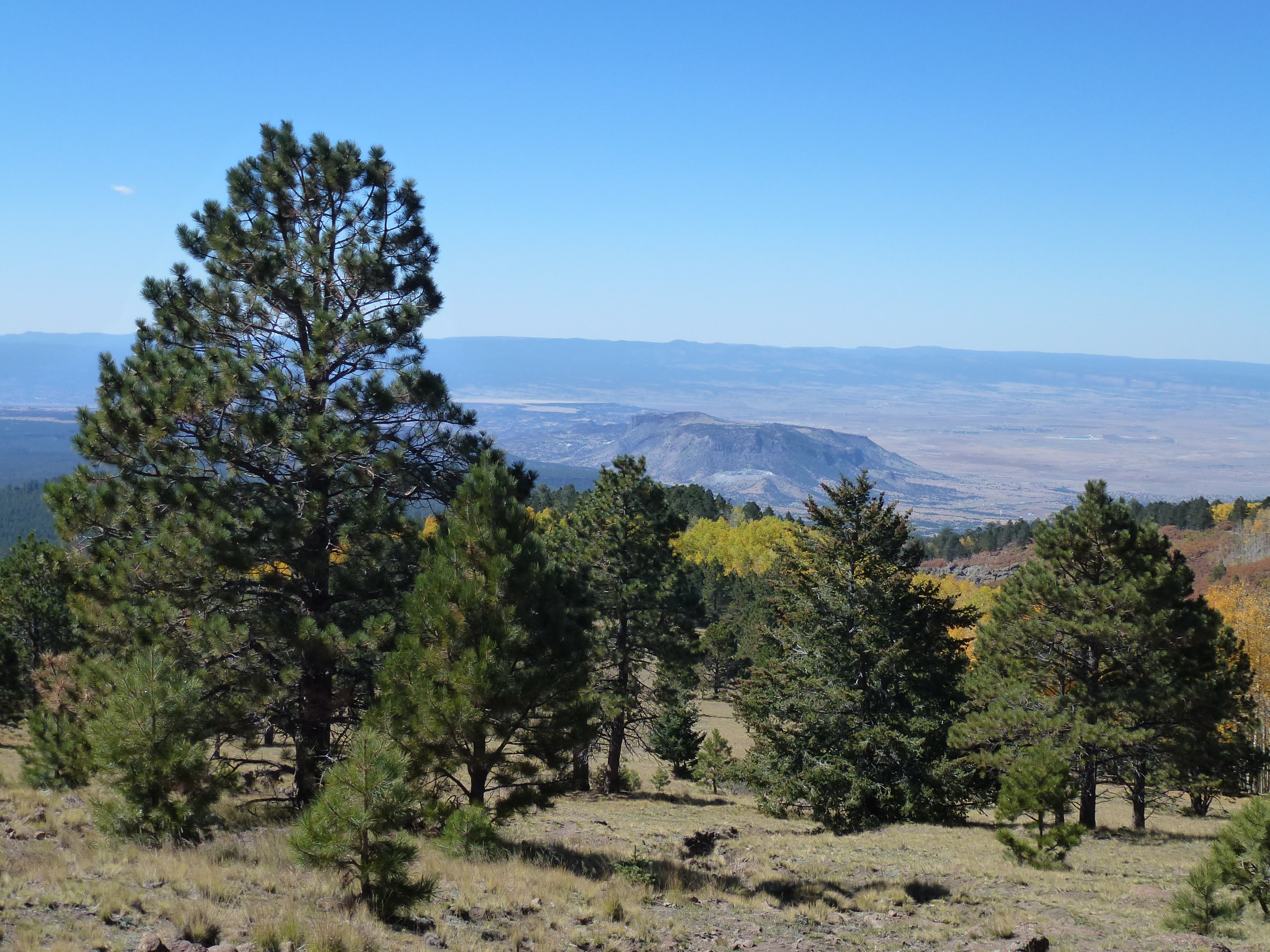
Subalpine forest at 10,000 feet (3,000 m) on slopes of Mount Taylor.

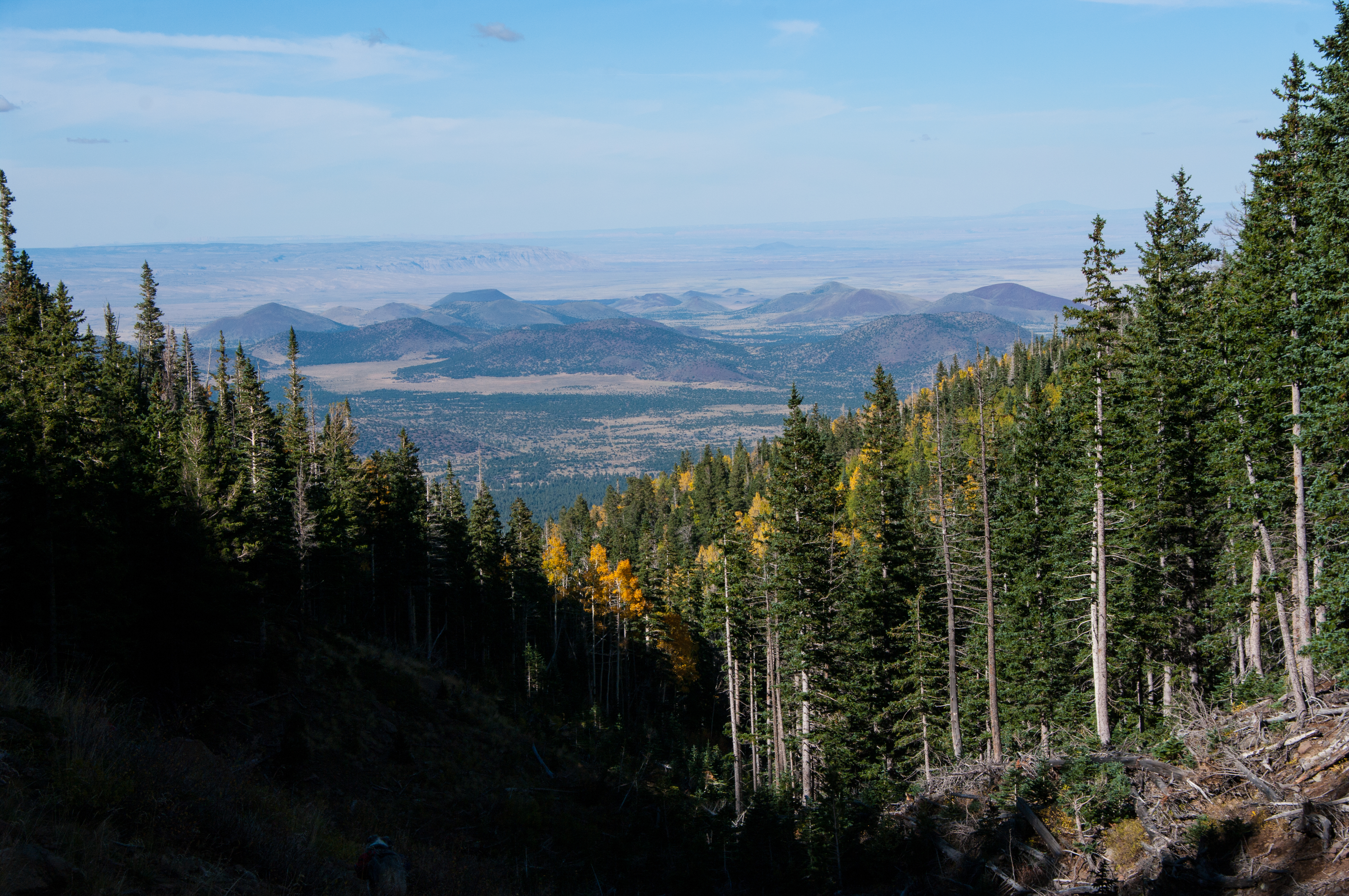
San Francisco Peaks, above the usual ponderosa zone but below the alpine tundra zone, between 9,000 and 11,500 feet (2,700 and 3,500 m).

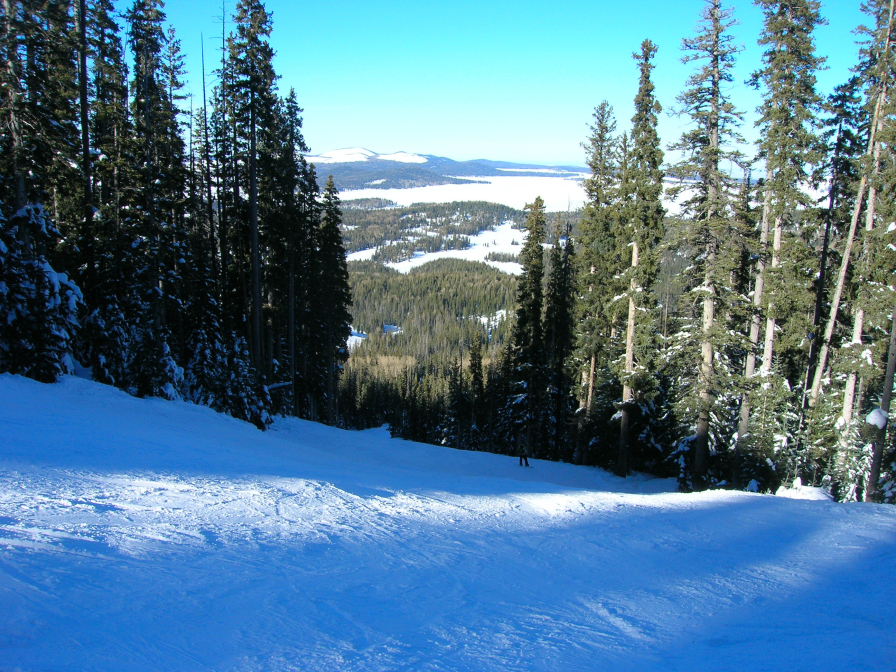
Sunrise Park Resort, located in the white Mountains of Arizona. Upper elevations are around 11,000 feet (3,400 m).

=== Conifer Woodlands and Savannas (23e) ===
The Conifer Woodlands and Savannas ecoregion is an area of mostly pinyon-juniper woodlands, with some ponderosa pine at higher elevations. It often intermingles with grasslands and shrublands. Although elevations are higher than surrounding ecoregion 22 areas, the boundaries tend to be transitional. The region is generally cooler, with more uniform winter and summer seasonal moisture compared to ecoregion 23b. It lacks the milder winters, wetter summers, chaparral, Madrean oaks, and other species of ecoregion 23b. That would exclude milder areas at lower elevations on the west sides of the Sandia and Manzano Mountains, plus in the lower, southern edge of the Jemez Mountains; those are mapped and described as ecoregion 23e, but fit the criteria under 23b.

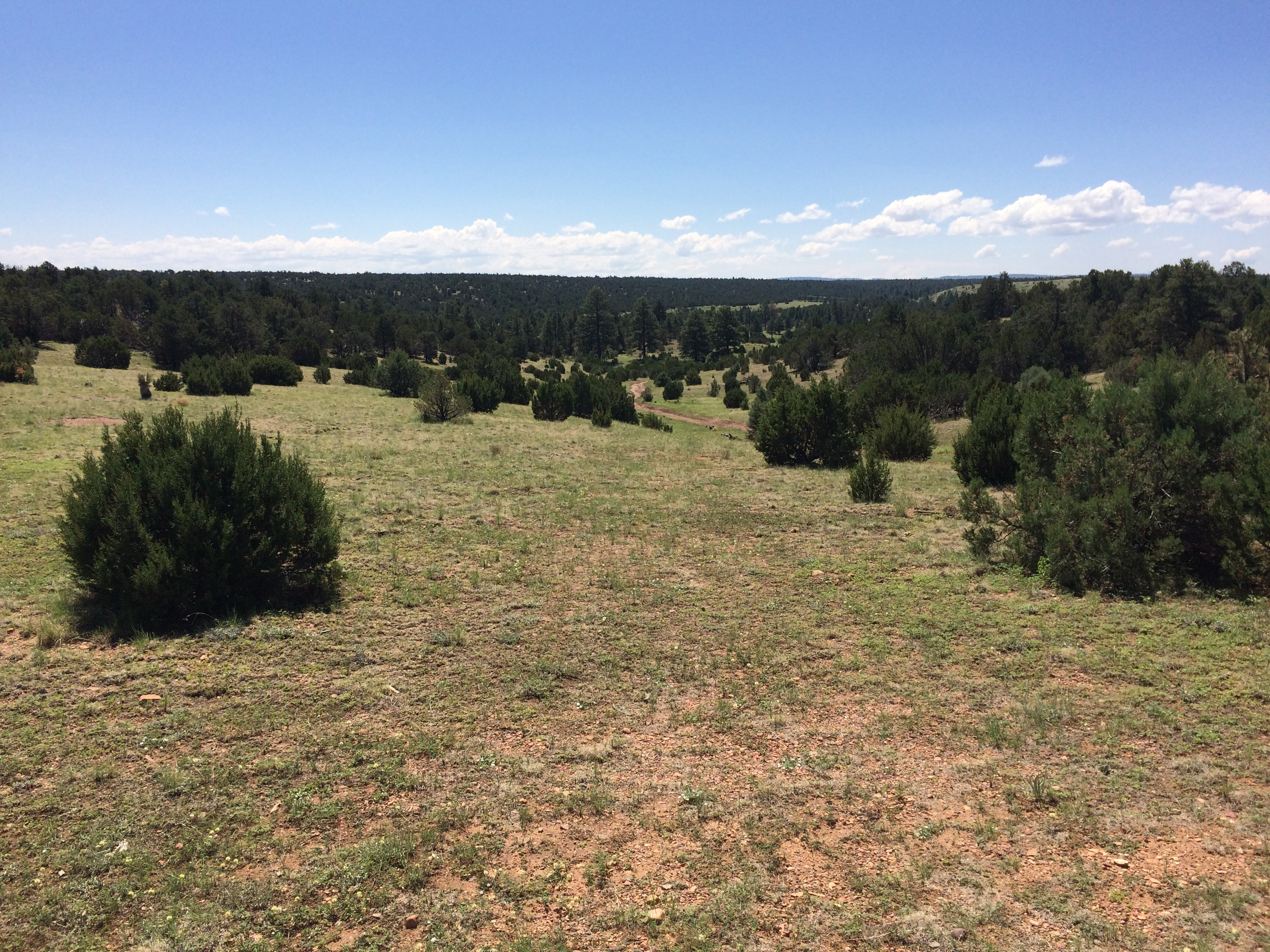
Pinyon–juniper woodland north of Heber, Arizona. This area roughly corresponds to ecoregion 23e.

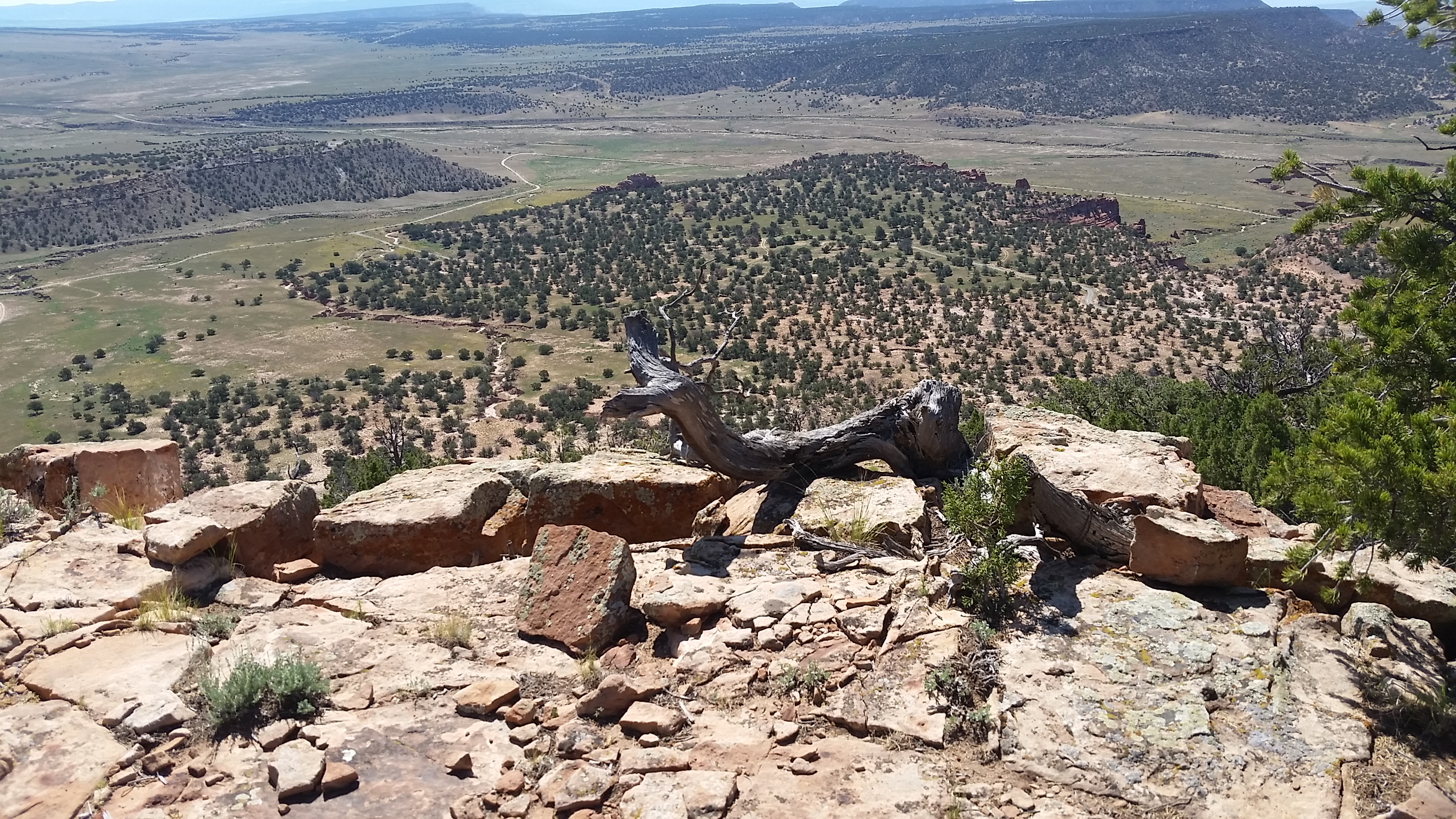
Juniper woodland near Prewitt, New Mexico

=== Rocky Mountain Conifer Forests (23f) ===
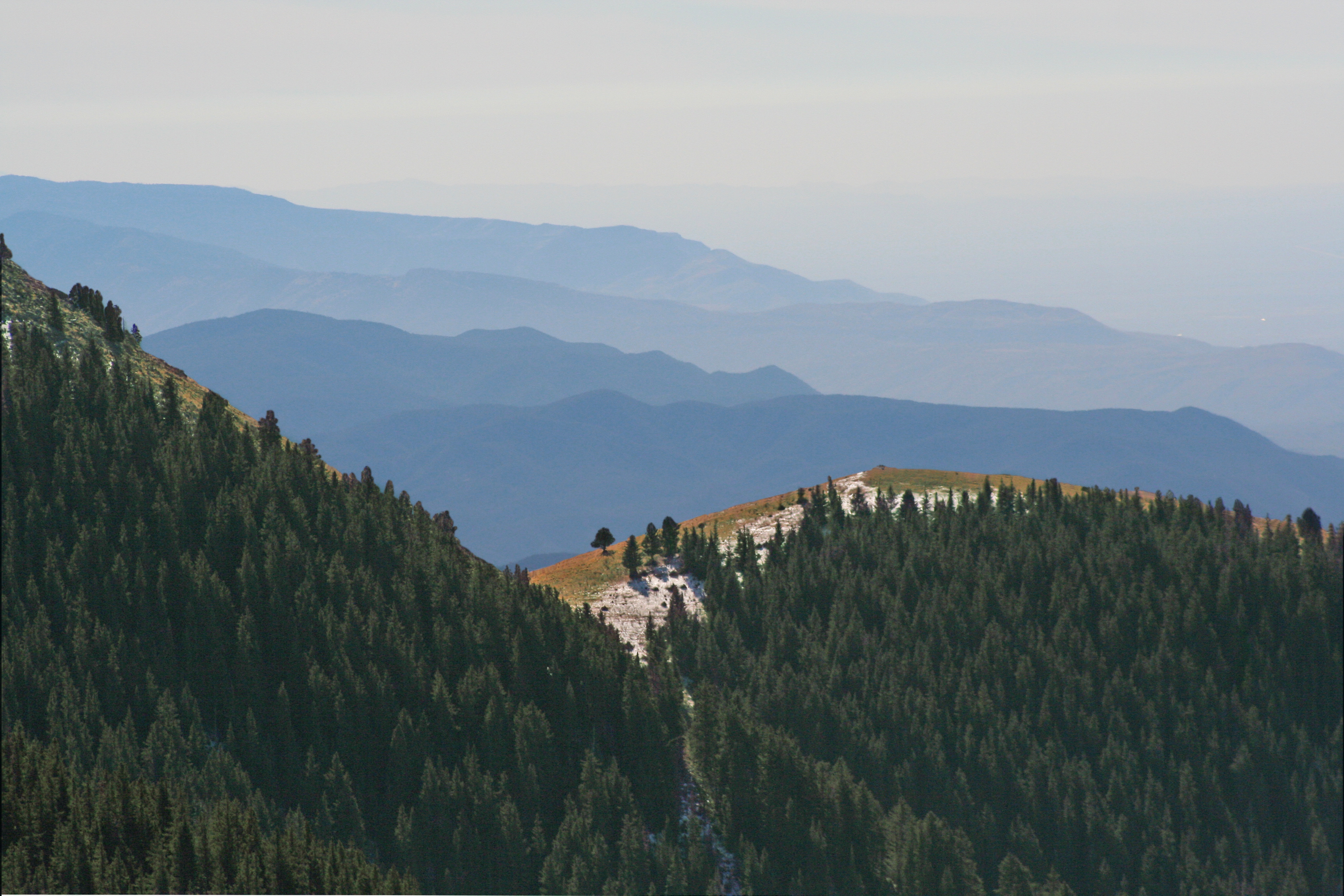
Sacramento Mountains (New Mexico)

The Rocky Mountain Conifer Forests are found at elevations from about 7,000 to 9,600 feet (2,100 to 2,900 m) in the mountains east of the Rio Grande. Similar to Ecoregion 23c, ponderosa pine and Gambel oak are common, with mountain mahogany and a dense understory. Some Douglas-fir, southwestern white pine, and white fir occur in a few areas. Blue spruce may occasionally be found in cool, moist canyons. In the Sandia and Manzano Mountains, white fir and Douglas-fir are more extensive than in other parts of the region. Current forests have been shaped by fire and fire suppression. It differs from Ecoregion 23c by some of the flora, fauna, and water quality characteristics that more closely resemble the Southern Rockies. The region is geologically diverse with volcanic, sedimentary, and some intrusive and crystalline rocks.

=== Rocky Mountain Subalpine Forests (23g) ===
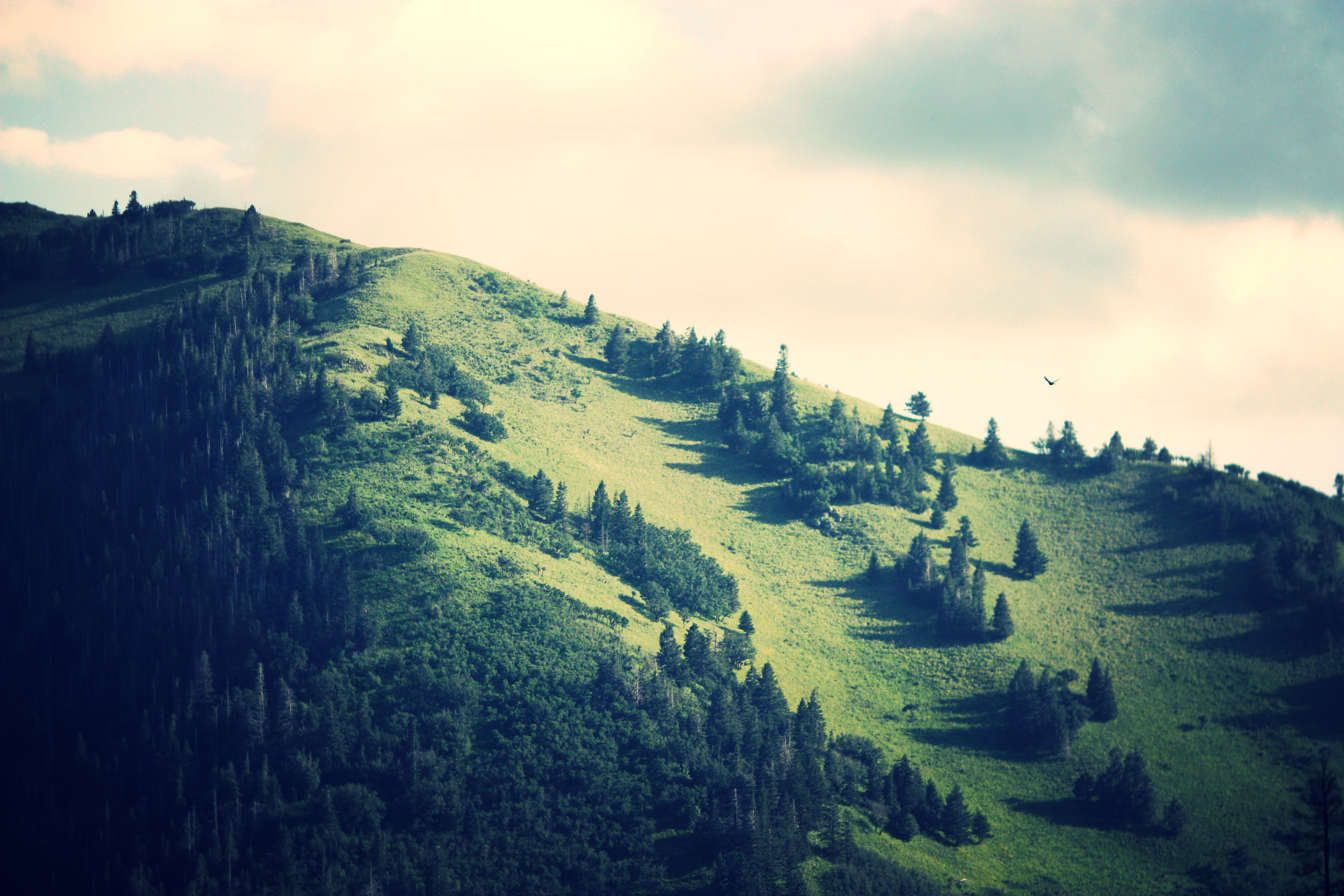
Subalpine meadows on Sierra Blanca Peak

The Rocky Mountain Subalpine Forests ecoregion occurs east of the Rio Grande at high elevations, generally above 9,500 feet (2,900 m). It includes parts of the Sandia Mountains, Capitan Mountains, and Sierra Blanca. The peak elevations are mostly above 10,000 feet (3,000 m), with Sierra Blanca Peak nearing 12,000 feet (3,700 m). There are some differences in flora, fauna, geology, and water quality from the subalpine ecoregion (23d) to the west. The major forest trees include Engelmann spruce, corkbark fir, blue spruce, white fir, and aspen. Some Douglas-fir occurs at lower elevations. There are a few small inclusions of montane grassland. A mix of geology occurs in the region. Sierra Blanca and the Capitan Mountains are composed of Tertiary volcanic and Intrusive rocks, while the Sandia Mountains to the north have a core of Precambrian rocks capped by Pennsylvanian sedimentary rocks.

=== Lower Mogollon Transition (23h) ===
The Lower Mogollon Transition occurs at elevations mostly between 3,000 to 5,000 feet (910 to 1,520 m) and contains diverse vegetation, including desert scrub, semi-desert grasslands, and chaparral communities. Some juniper woodland occurs at higher elevations. The hilly to mountainous terrain has numerous canyons and valleys, and a variety of rock types. It is mostly lower, warmer, and drier than adjacent Ecoregion 23b. Precipitation averages 12 to 25 inches (300 to 640 mm). Vegetation includes canotia, mesquite, catclaw acacia, jojoba, turbinella oak, mountain-mahogany, ceanothus, shrubby buckwheat, skunkbush sumac, and silktassel. Grassy areas have tobosa, grama grass species, and plains lovegrass, along with scattered agaves, yuccas, sotol, opuntia, and snakeweed.

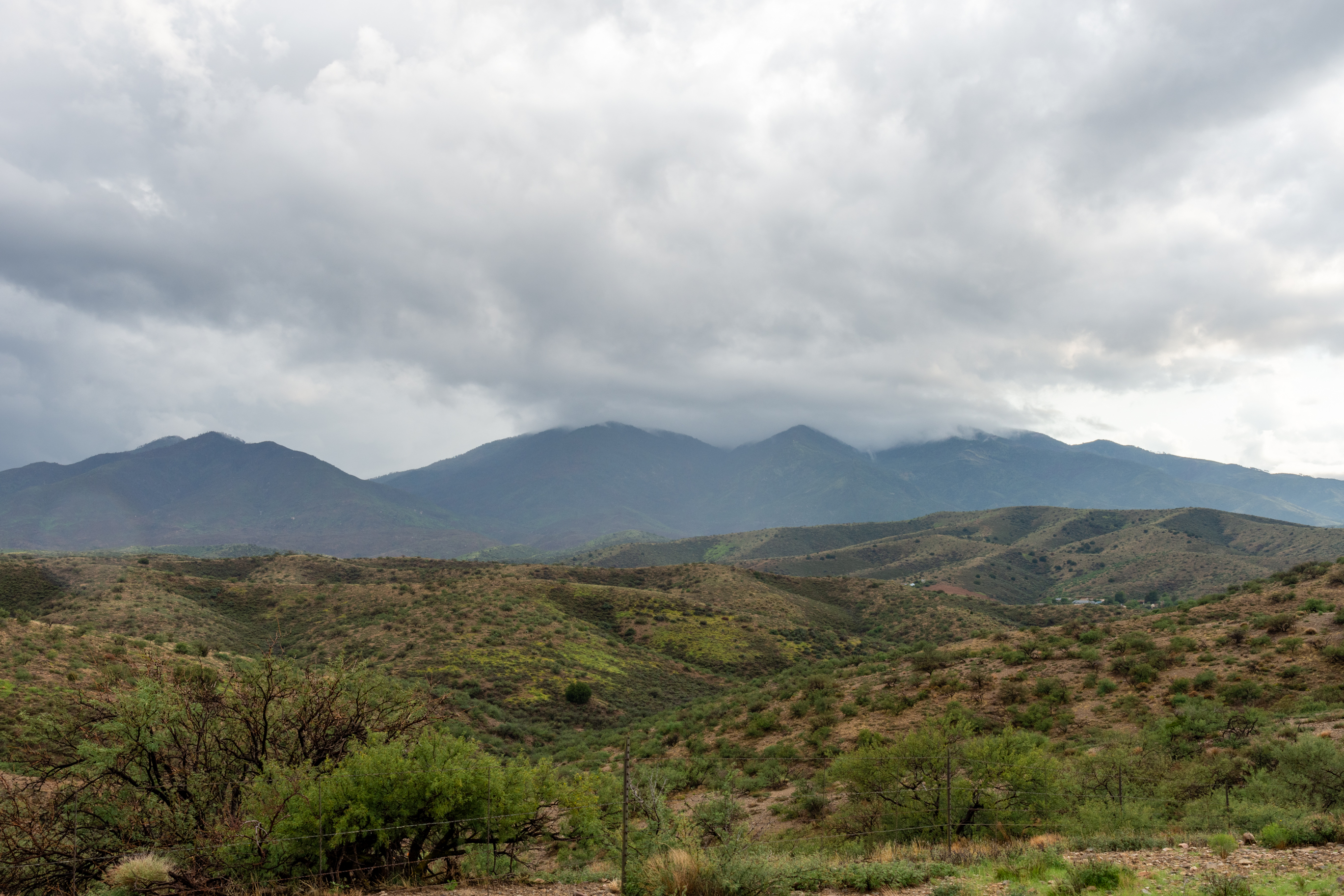
Surroundings south of Globe, Arizona, a city within ecoregion 23h. In the background are the Pinal Mountains, which also contains small patches of 23b and 23l.

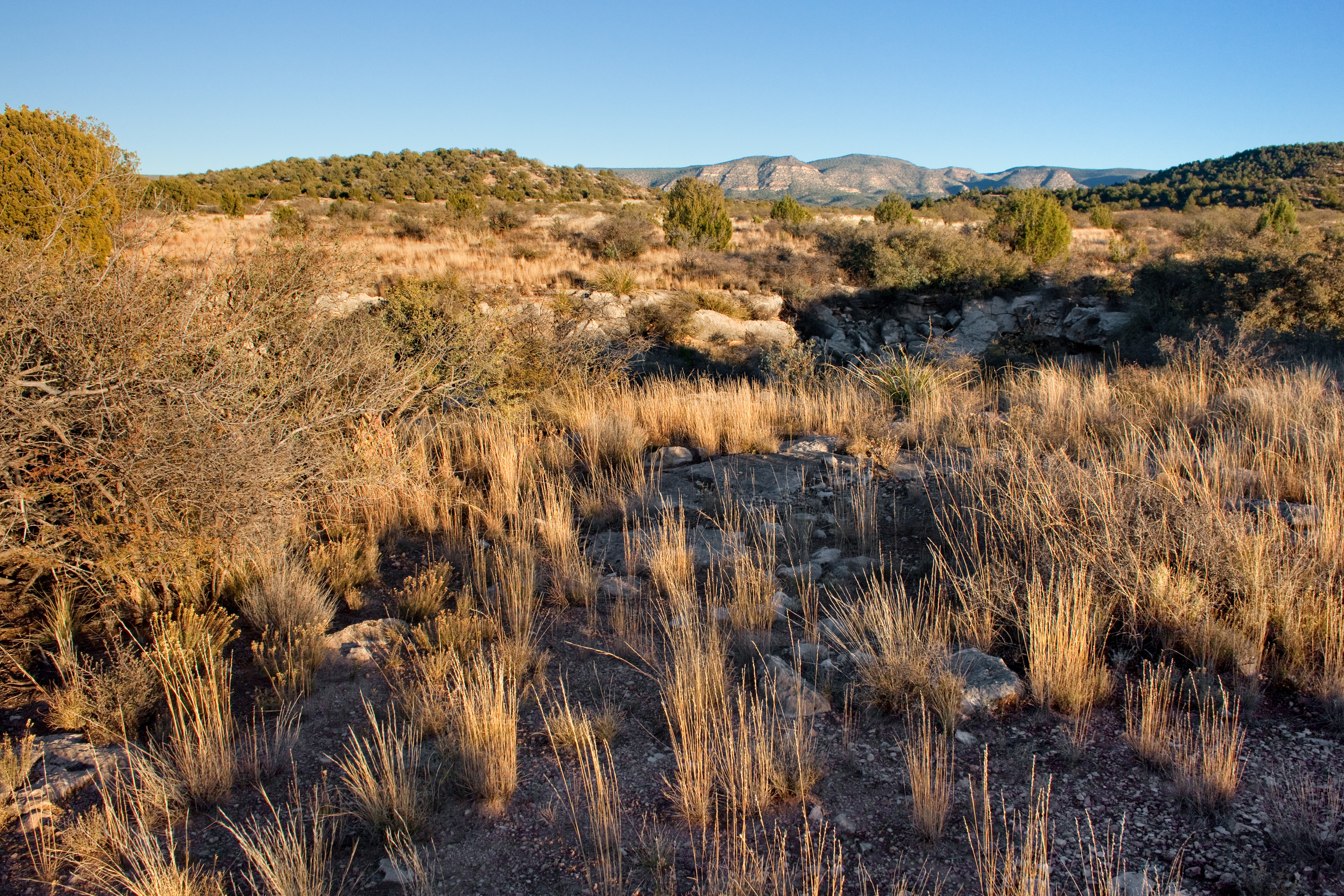
Surroundings near Rimrock, Arizona, also located roughly in ecoregion 23h. Also located within the wider Verde Valley.

=== Montane and Subalpine Grasslands (23i) ===
The Montane and Subalpine Grasslands ecoregion includes subalpine grasslands that occur above about 8,500 feet (2,600 m) in elevation, as well as some of the other larger montane grasslands of the Arizona/New Mexico Mountains, typically above 7,500 feet (2,300 m). Precipitation averages about 23 to 35 inches (580 to 890 mm) per year. The larger areas tend to be relatively flat with poorly drained soils. Vegetation includes mixed sedge species, Arizona fescue, mountain muhly, pine dropseed, ponderosa pine, spruce, fir, and quaking aspen. The high elevation grasslands and forest edges provide important habitat for elk, deer, gophers, and voles, as well as numerous bird species. Some of these areas have been used for summer forage for cattle and sheep, especially since the late 1800s, leading to erosion and changes in grass and forb communities. Exotic grasses such as Kentucky bluegrass have become more common.

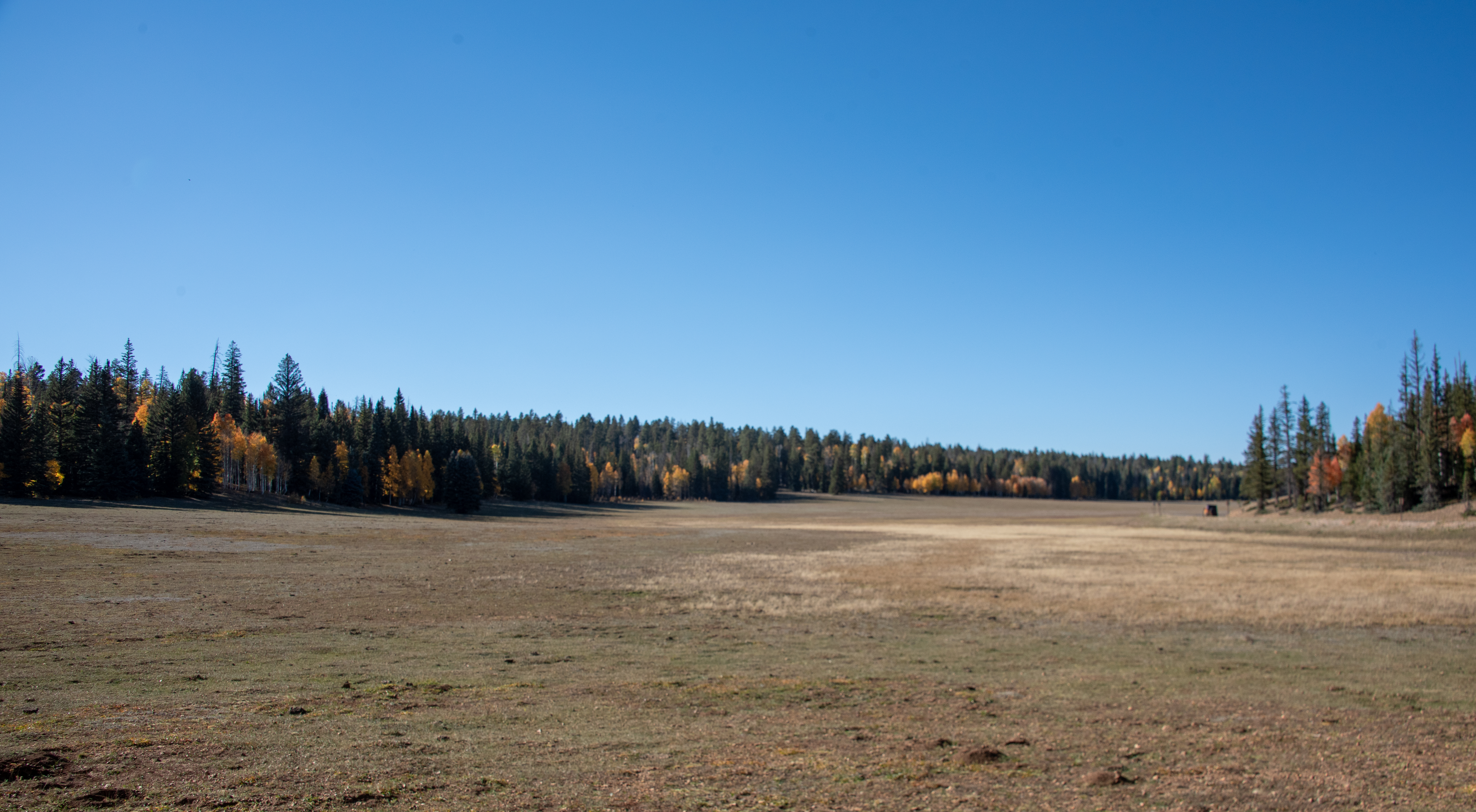
This 8.5-mile (13.7 km) long grassland meadow on the Kaibab Plateau corresponds roughly to ecoregion 23i. The elevation of this meadow is over 8,600 feet (2,600 m). Plains bison were reintroduced here in 1906, the Kaibab herd is one of only a few free roaming bison herds in the USA.

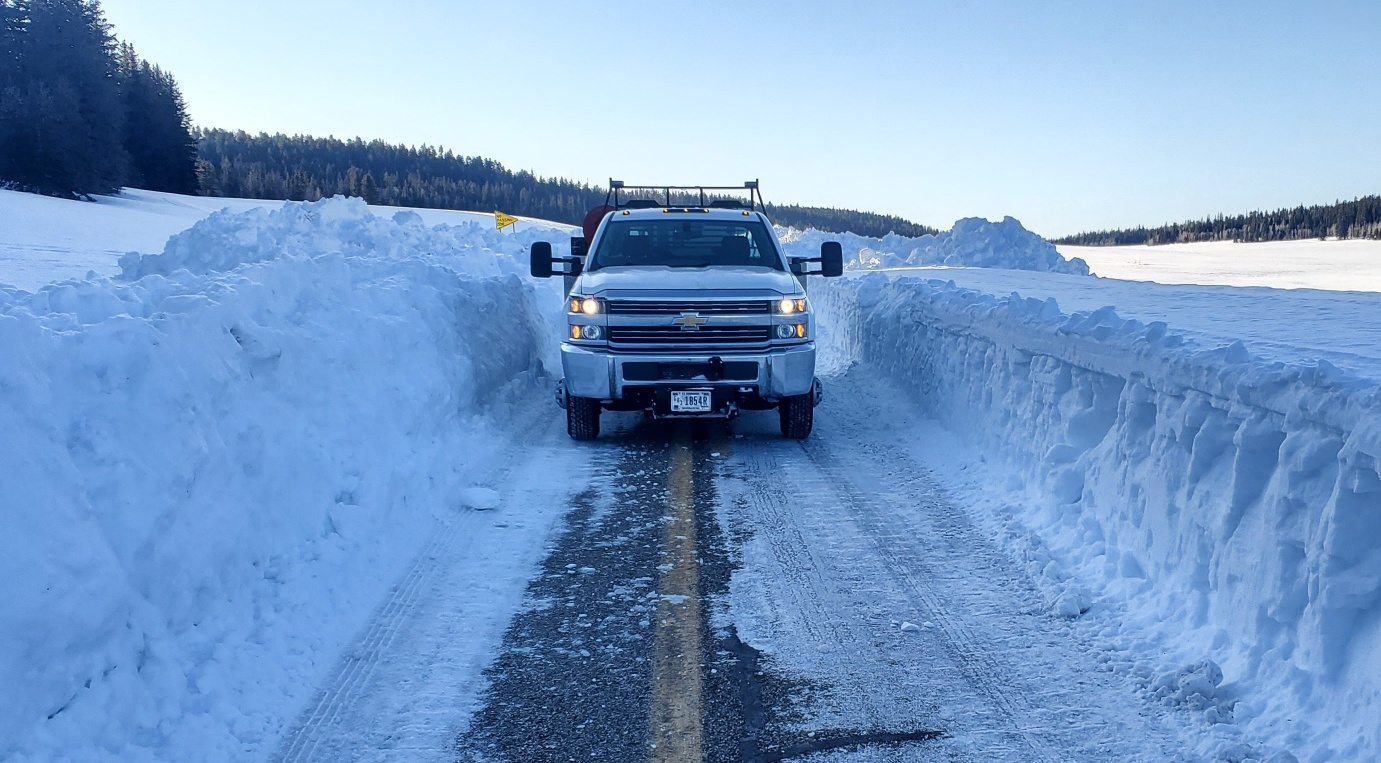
The same north rim Grand Canyon/Kaibab Plateau grassland meadow in winter.

=== Northern Woodlands and Sagebrush (23j) ===
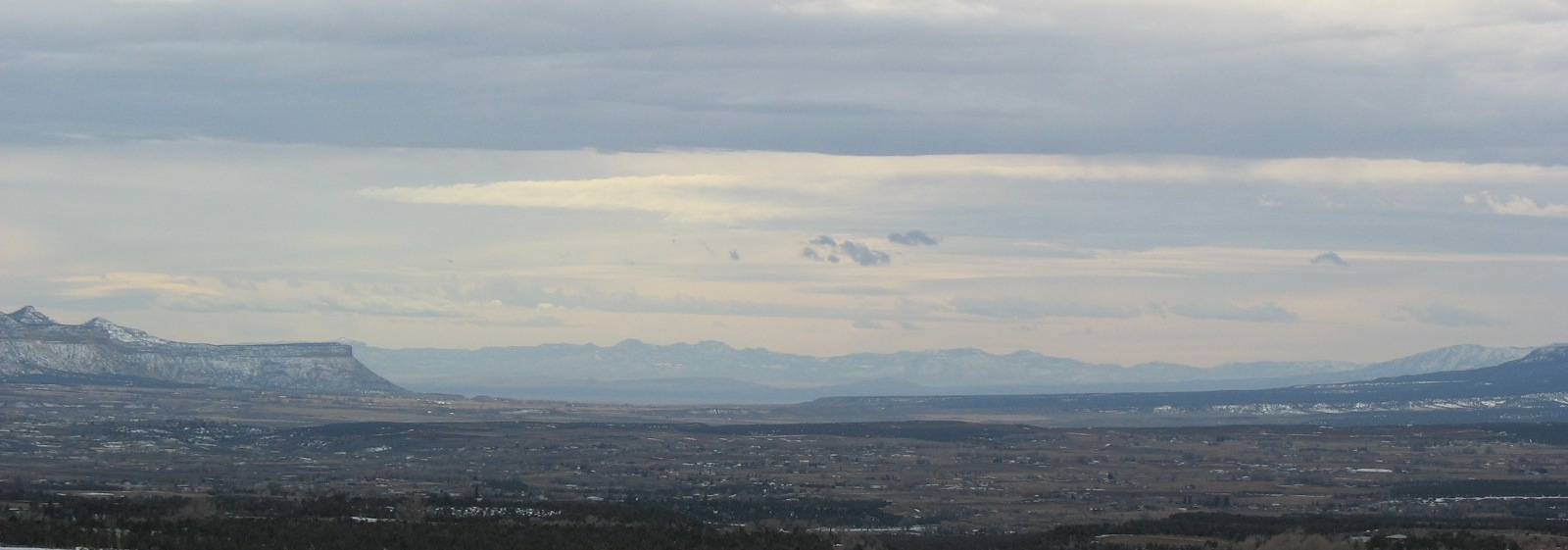
Chuska Mountains

The Northern Woodlands and Sagebrush ecoregion occurs at the lower elevations of the Kaibab Plateau and, to the east, surrounds the Defiance Plateau and the Chuska and Carrizo Mountains. Juniper and pinyon pine dominate the woodland similar to Ecoregion 23e to the south; however, in this northern region, sagebrush is a more conspicuous component, and there is a less diverse grass and forb community. The climate also differs from Ecoregion 23e in that the majority of precipitation here occurs in the low-sun, cold season.

=== Sunset Crater Volcanics (23k) ===
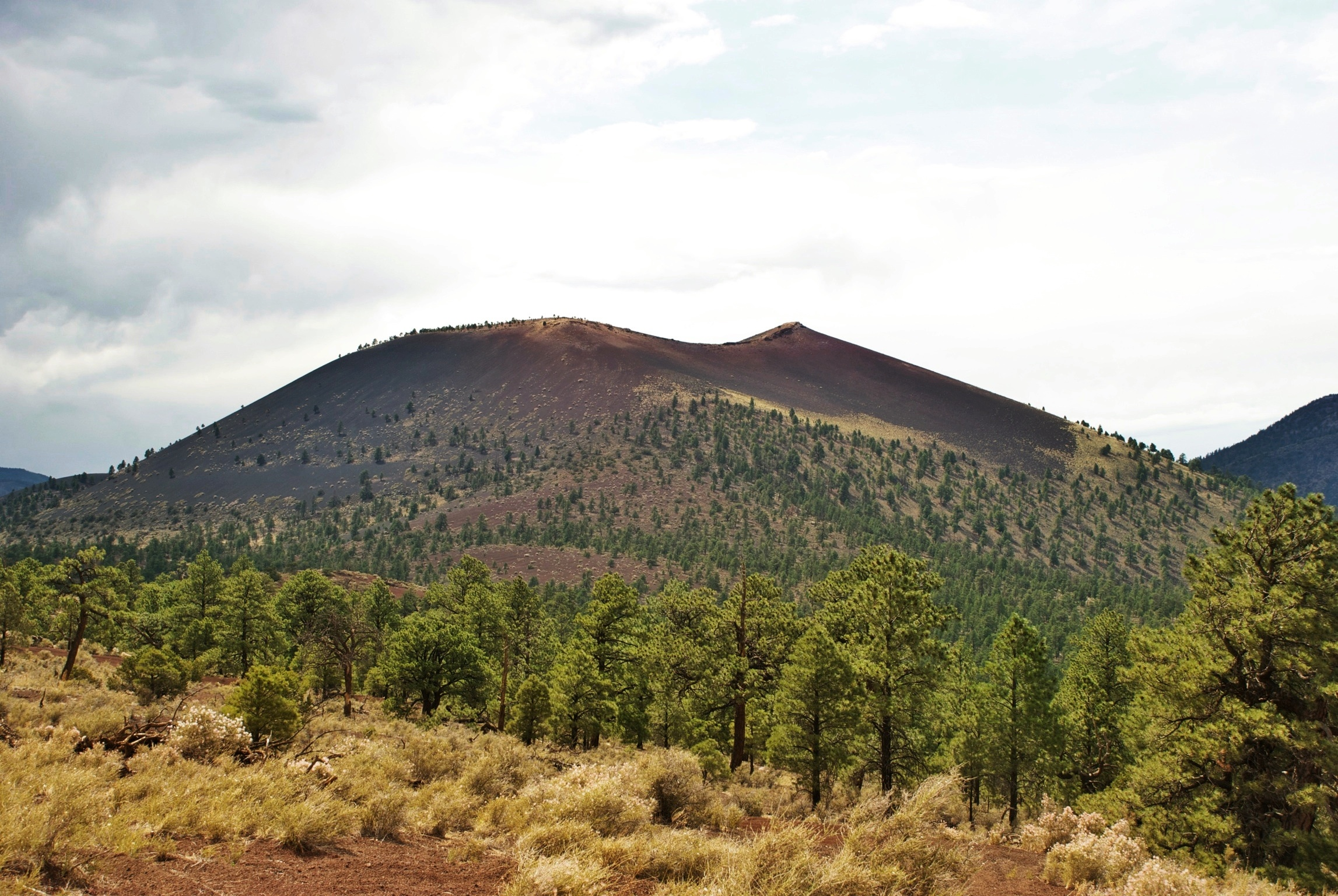
Stunted conifers in front of Sunset Crater

The Sunset Crater Volcanics ecoregion includes volcanic cones, lava flows, and cinder and ash deposits, and is distinguished from adjacent areas by its stunted conifer trees and several endemic species. Although some of these youngest Holocene and Pleistocene volcanic features extend to the east and north, this region encompasses only the forested or wooded portions of an area that was affected by the most recent eruptions about 900 to 1000 years ago. This is the youngest part of the San Francisco Volcanic Field, a field with a 6 million year history and an area that extends west to near Williams, Arizona. The San Francisco Volcanic Field contains more than 600 volcanic vents.

=== Mogollon Transition Conifer Forests (23l) ===
The Mogollon Transition Conifer Forests ecoregion includes the areas of pine forests that occur below the Mogollon Rim and in scattered high-elevation patches on the southern side of Ecoregion 23. The ponderosa pine forests in these southern mountains have a Sierra Madre flora influence, with evergreen oaks such as silverleaf oak, netleaf oak, and Emory oak. These areas are generally less productive for commercial timber than the forests of Ecoregion 23c because of competition with dense understory brush and evergreen oaks.

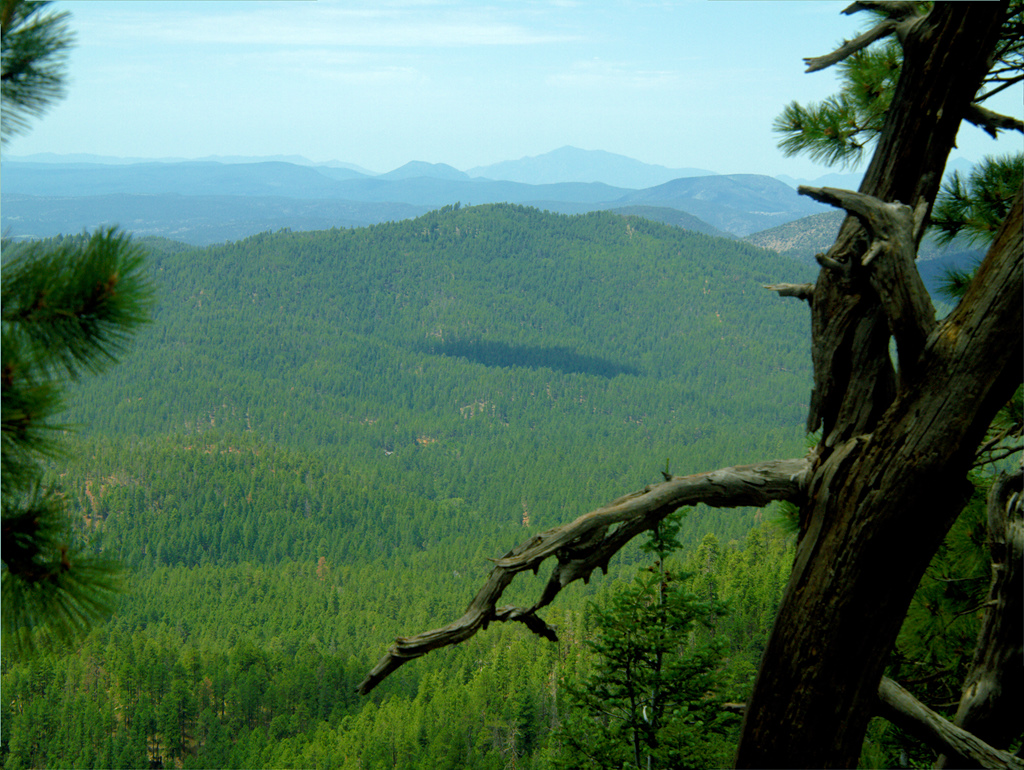
Forest immediately below the Mogollon Rim in Arizona. This roughly corresponds to ecoregion 23l. The elevation is typically 4,600 to 6,000 feet (1,400 to 1,800 m) in this area of Arizona.

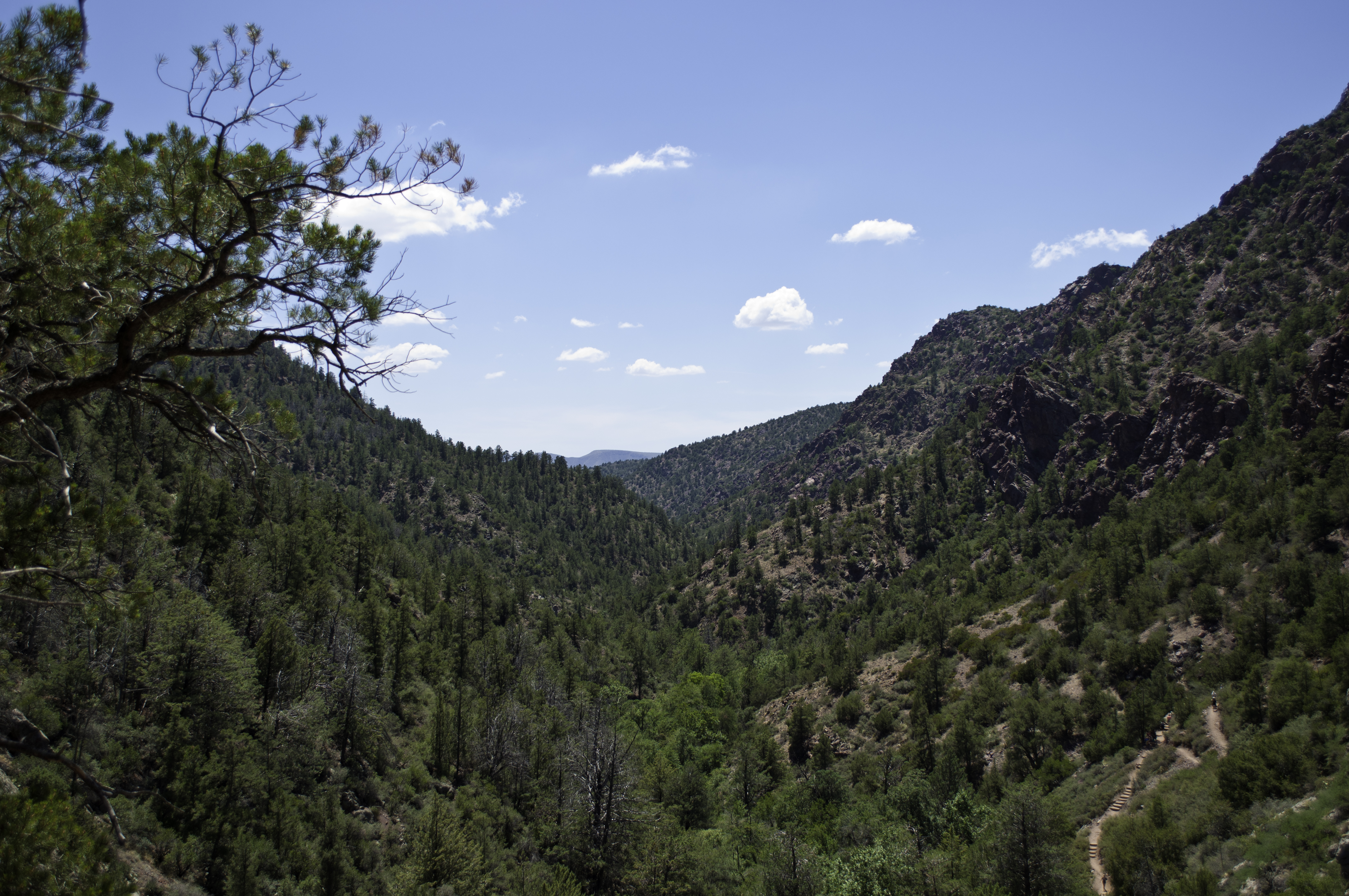

== Flora and Fauna ==
The Arizona/New Mexico mountains ecoregion is exceptionally diverse in plant and animal life. According to a 1999 study published by the World Wildlife Fund there may be at least 2,817 species of native vascular plants in the Arizona/New Mexico mountains ecoregion. This number may be outdated as there is an estimated 12 new species of native vascular plants described from the state of Arizona annually according to SEINet. There are also a significant number of endemic species within the region.

Plant species native to the region include ponderosa pine, Arizona white oak, Emory oak, Gambel oak, quaking aspen, Arizona walnut, alligator juniper, New Mexico juniper, Douglas fir, Engelmann spruce, white fir, subalpine fir, Blue spruce, Arizona sycamore, bigtooth maple, boxelder maple, various Penstemon species, golden columbine, Arizona thistle, New Mexico thistle, several Opuntia species, many Agave species, and numerous Asteraceae species.

Animal species found in the region include Mexican gray wolf, American black bear, Rocky Mountain elk, bighorn sheep, mule deer, Coues white-tailed deer, American beaver, coyote, mountain lion, plains bison (wild herd reintroduced to northern Arizona), more than 300 bird species, more than 20 bat species, western Hercules beetle, giant desert centipede, Arizona blonde tarantula, Arizona black rattlesnake, Arizona mountain kingsnake, blackneck garter snake, Wright's mountain tree frog, canyon tree frog, western chorus frog, northern leopard frog, Chiricahua leopard frog, barred tiger salamander, roundtail chub, Apache trout, Gila trout, speckled dace, and longfin dace.

A significant number of macro fungi are also reported from the state of Arizona. According to MycoPortal, at least 2,235 species of macro fungi have been reported from Arizona, which is believed to be an incomplete accounting of the total macro fungi diversity of Arizona. A significant portion of these species are reported from the Arizona/New Mexico mountains ecoregion within Arizona.

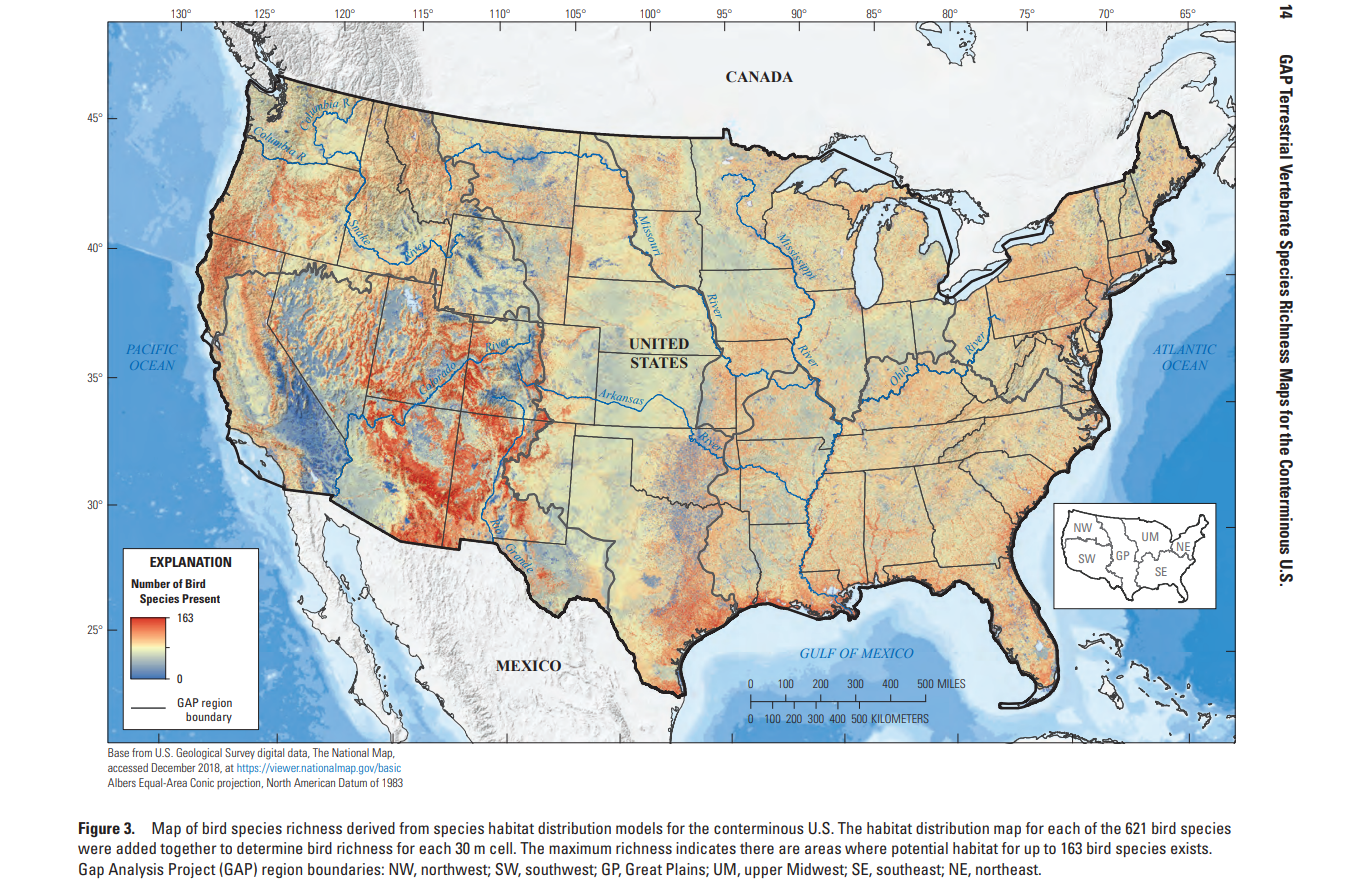
Bird species richness for the conterminous US, Gergely et al 2019 USGS. The Mogollon Rim and Arizona/New Mexico mountains ecoregion appear prominently as areas of high bird species richness.

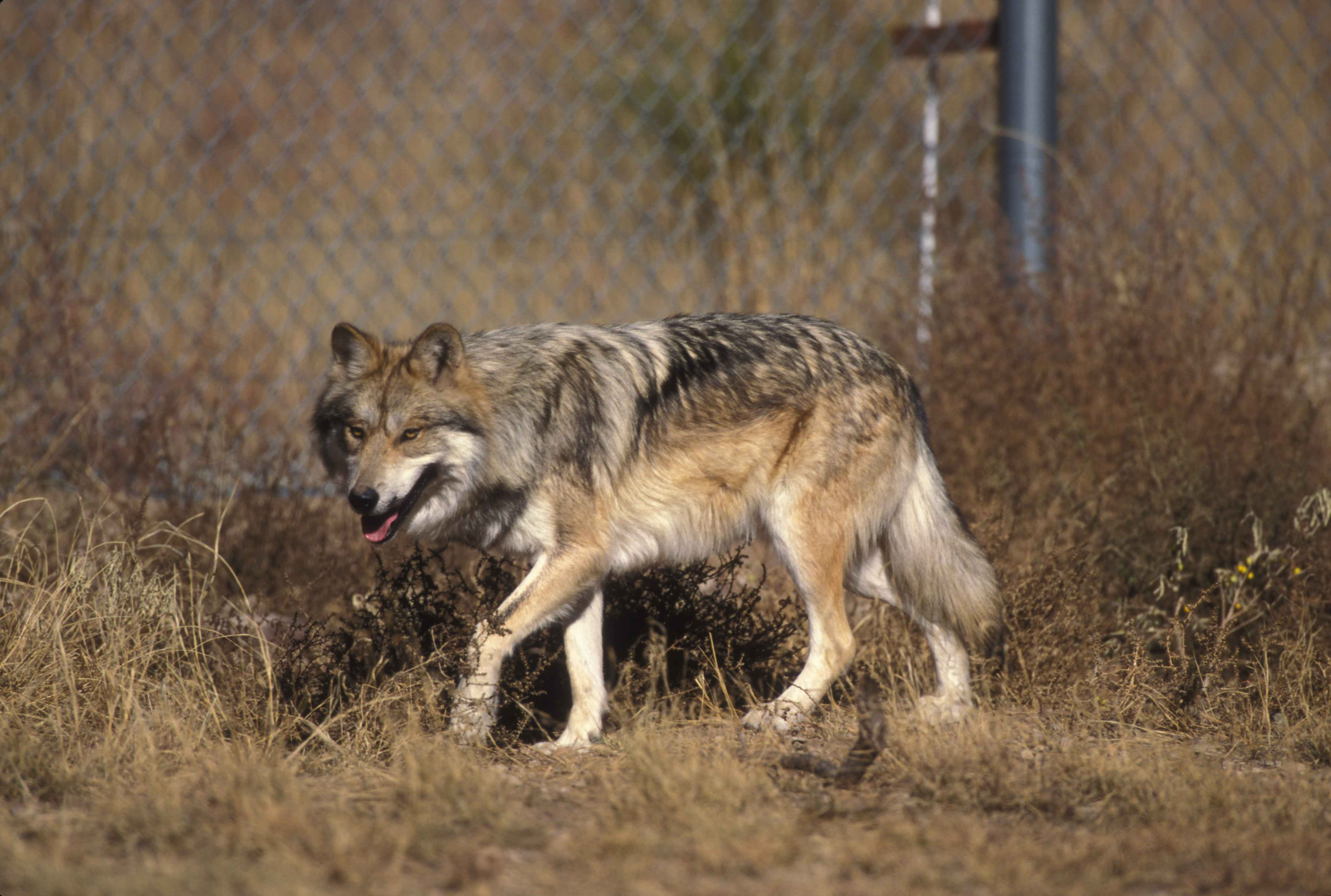
Mexican wolf

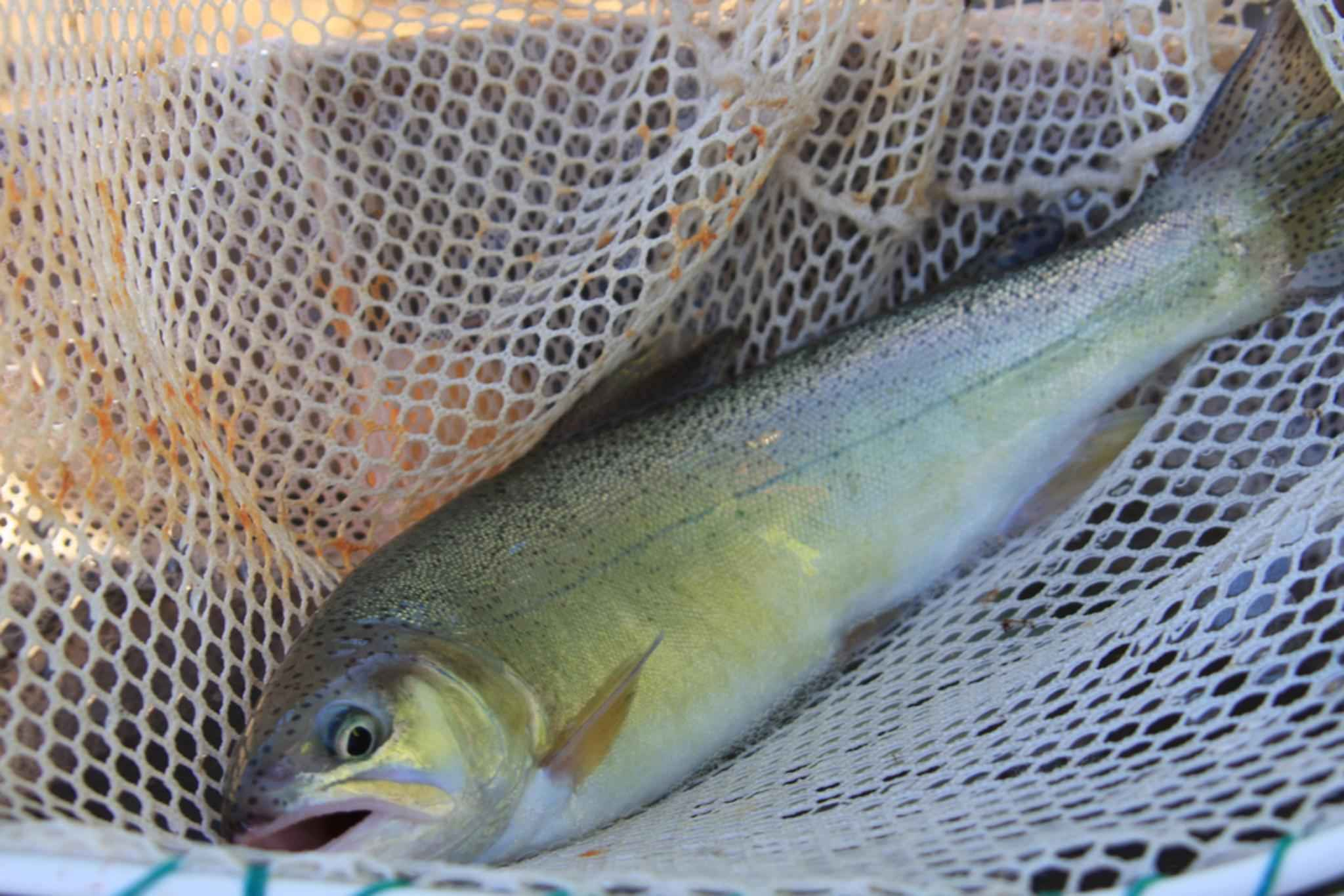
Gila trout

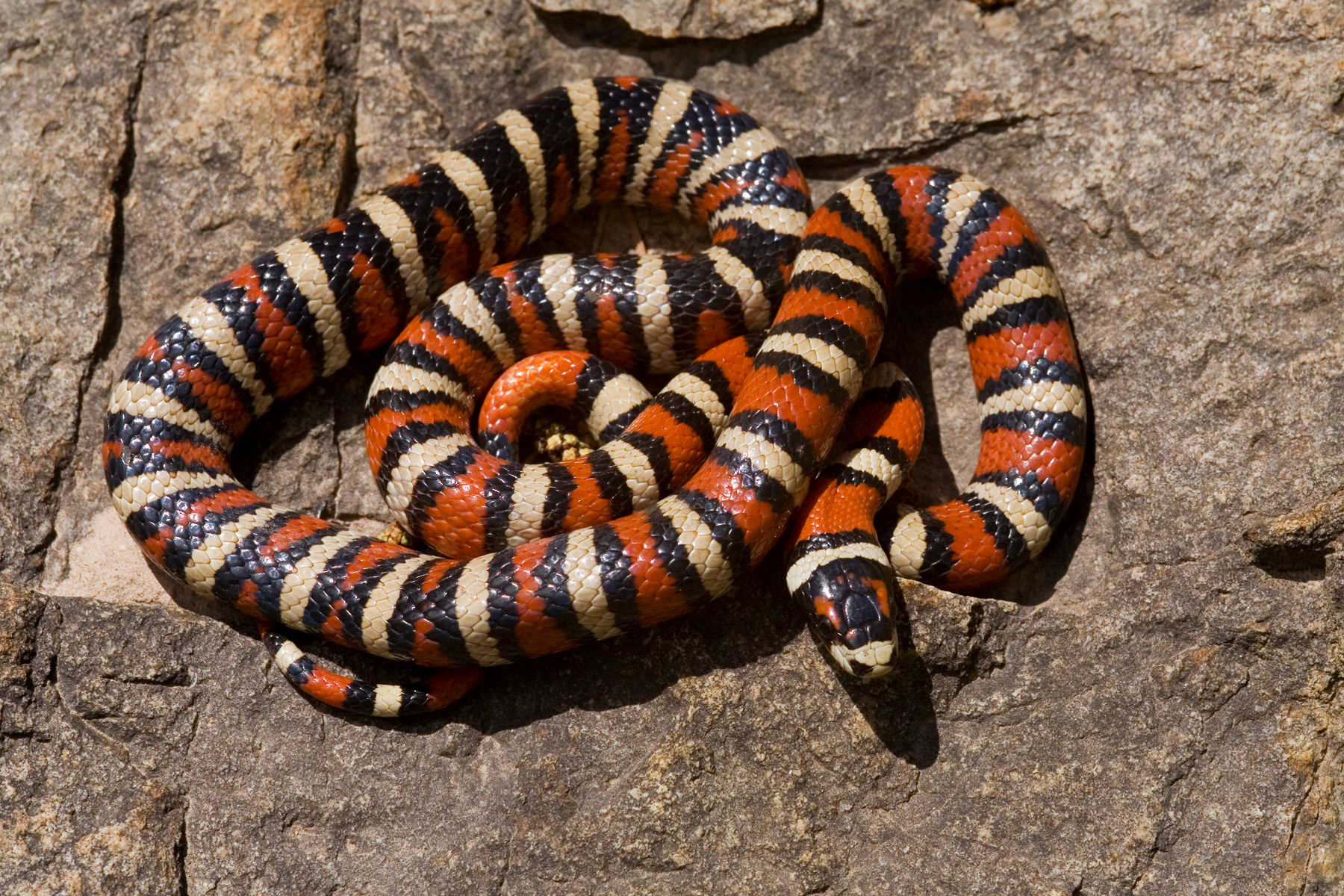
Arizona mountain kingsnake

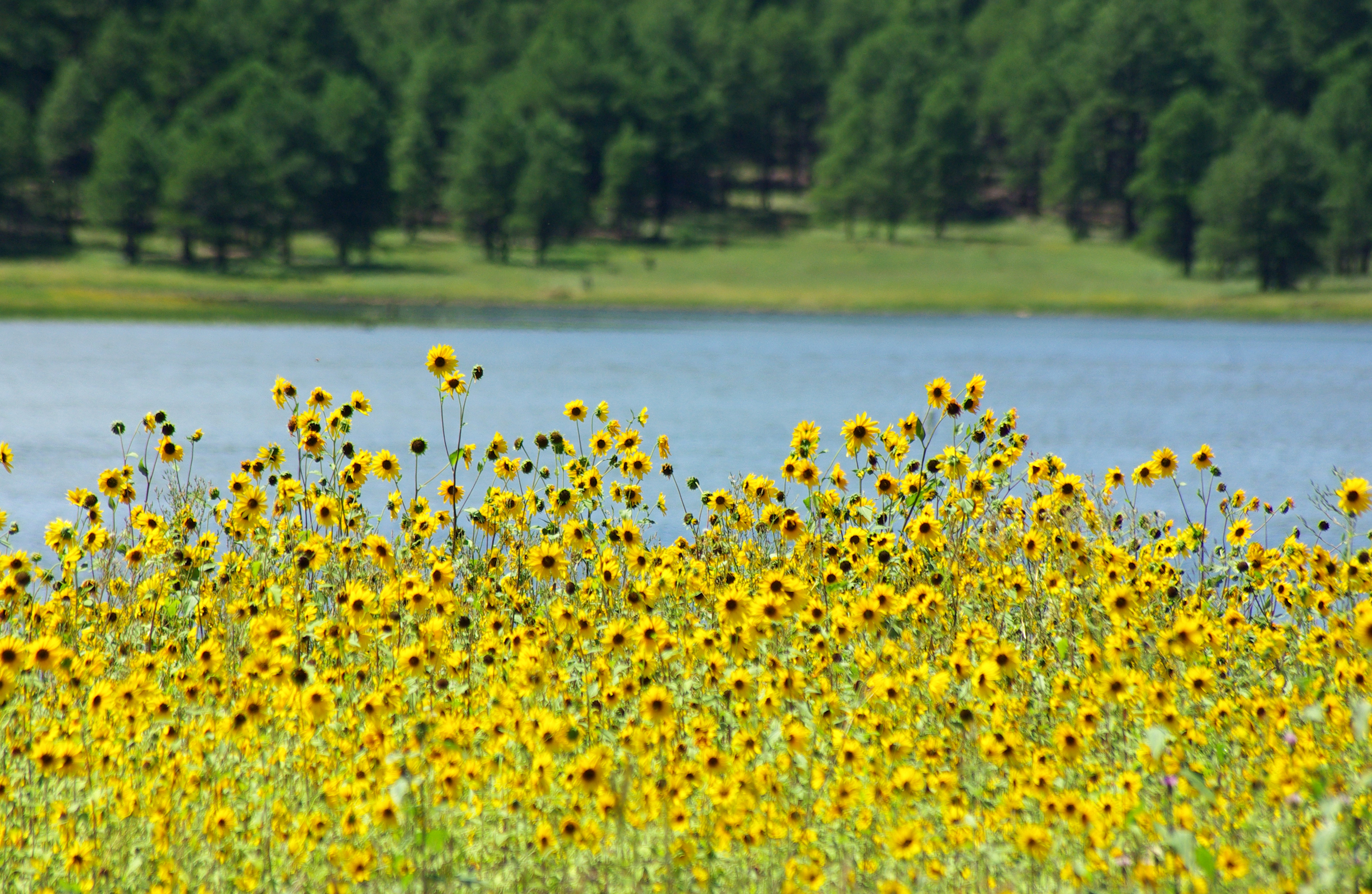
Sunflowers at Lake Mary in Arizona

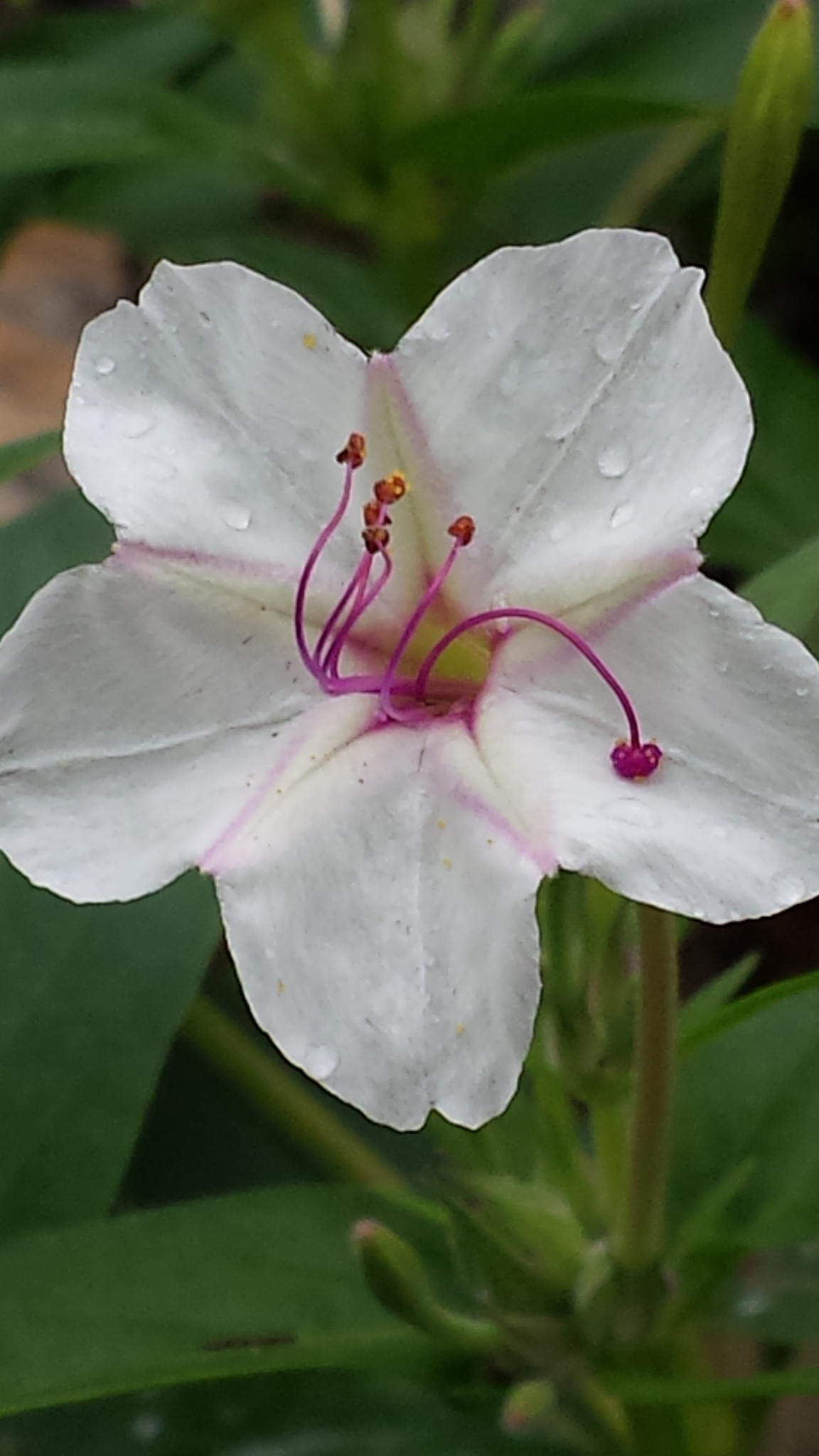
Mirabilis longiflora

== Threats and preservation ==
This is a fairly stable ecoregion with about 25% of original habitat still intact although vulnerable to logging and overgrazing. Pollution and reduction of rivers are threatening specific plants and animals including Fremont cottonwood (Populus fremontii) and Goodding's willow (Salix gooddingii), the threatened Gila trout (Oncorhynchus gilae), and the endangered southwestern willow flycatcher (Empidonax traillii extimus). Logging continues to remove habitat of the Mexican spotted owl (Strix occidentalis lucida) and the northern goshawk (Accipiter gentalis).

Large blocks of remaining habitat include: the Aldo Leopold Wilderness/Gila Wilderness/Blue Range Wilderness and the El Malpais National Monument and Conservation Area in southwestern New Mexico; the Kaibab National Forest, Blue Range Primitive Area, Grand Canyon National Park, the Mazatzal Mountains including Four Peaks, Superstition Mountains, Sycamore Canyon, Red Rock-Secret Mountain Wilderness, Hellsgate Wilderness, Pinal Mountains in the Tonto National Forest and the Galiuro Mountains in Arizona; the Chuska Mountains on Navajo lands; and the Guadalupe Mountains including the Carlsbad Caverns in southeastern New Mexico and western Texas. Much of this is linked and well-protected within national parkland.

== See also ==
- List of mountain ranges of Arizona
- List of mountain ranges of New Mexico
- Mogollon Rim
- Arizona transition zone
- Ecoregions defined by the EPA and the Commission for Environmental Cooperation:
  - List of ecoregions in North America (CEC)
  - List of ecoregions in the United States (EPA)
- The conservation group World Wildlife Fund maintains an alternate classification system:
  - List of ecoregions (WWF)
  - List of ecoregions in the United States (WWF)
