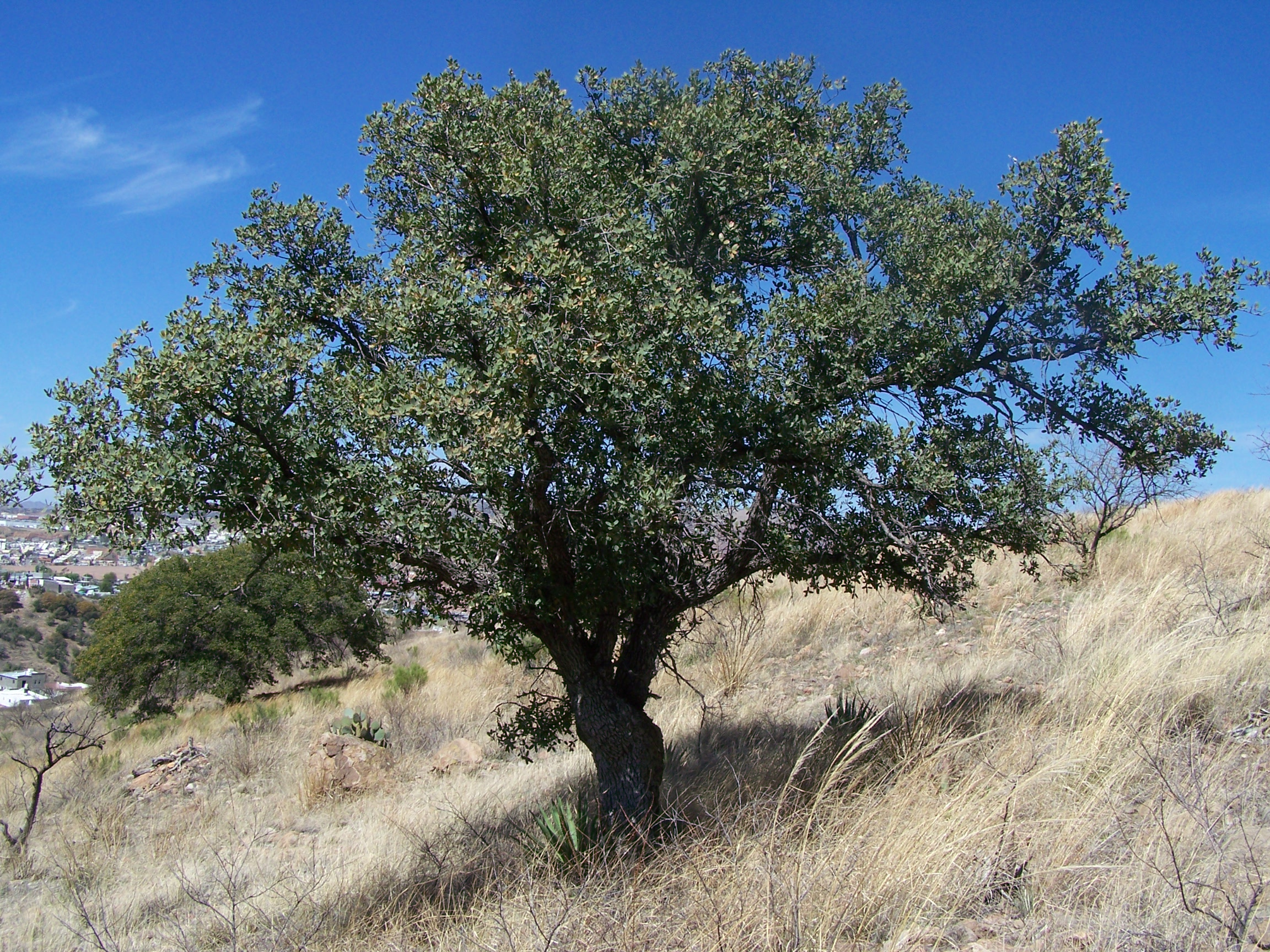

Conservation status
- Least Concern (IUCN 3.1)

- Secure (NatureServe)

Scientific classification
- Kingdom: Plantae
- Clade: Embryophytes
- Clade: Tracheophytes
- Clade: Spermatophytes
- Clade: Angiosperms
- Clade: Eudicots
- Clade: Rosids
- Order: Fagales
- Family: Fagaceae
- Genus: Quercus
- Subgenus: Quercus subg. Quercus
- Section: Quercus sect. Lobatae
- Species: Q. emoryi

Binomial name
- Quercus emoryi Torr.
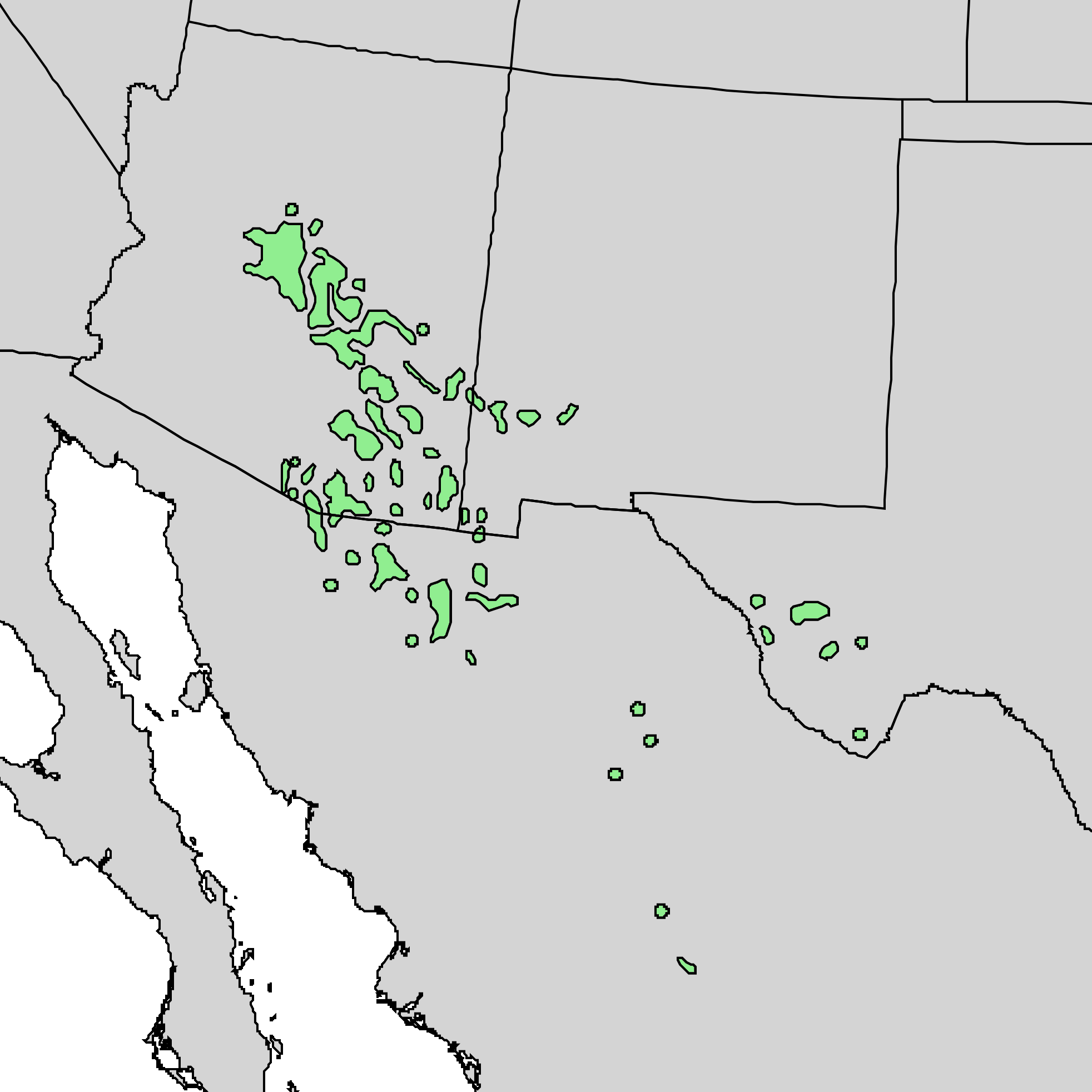
- Natural range of Quercus emoryi

Synonyms
- Quercus balsequillana Trel.; Quercus duraznillo Trel.; Quercus duraznillo f. bullata Trel.; Quercus duraznillo f. cochutensis Trel.; Quercus duraznillo f. pinetorum Trel.; Quercus hastata Liebm.

= Quercus emoryi =

Emory oak

Species of oak tree

Quercus emoryi, the Emory oak, is a species of oak common in Arizona (including inside Saguaro National Park), New Mexico and western Texas (including inside Big Bend National Park), United States, and northern Mexico (Sonora, Chihuahua, Coahuila (including Parque Nacional Maderas del Carmen), Durango, Nuevo León, and San Luis Potosí). It typically grows in dry hills at moderate altitudes.

== Description ==
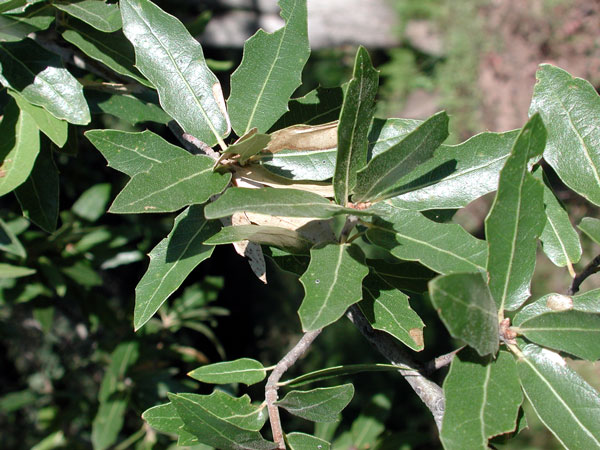
Leaves

Quercus emoryi is a wintergreen tree in the red oak group, retaining its leaves throughout the winter until new leaves are produced in spring. It is a large shrub or small tree from 5–17 metres (16–56 feet) tall. The leaves are 3–6 centimetres (1–2 1/2 inches) long, simple or wavy-toothed, leathery, dark green above, paler below. The acorns are 1.5–2 cm (5/8–3/4 in) long, blackish-brown, and mature in 6–8 months from pollination; the kernel is sweet, and is an important food for people and for certain other mammals.

The seeds of this tree are called chich'il in Ndee, wi-yo:thi or toa in O'odham, bellotas in Spanish, and acorns in English. The English and Latin botanical names for this tree come from the name of a United States Army surveyor, Lieutenant William Hemsley Emory, who surveyed the area that had become known as West-Texas in the 1840s.

== Ecology ==
The Emory acorn is sweet and is an important food for livestock, deer, squirrels, cliff chipmunks (Tamnias dorsalis), and birds such as quail and wild turkeys. Deer and livestock also browse the foliage.

== Uses ==
Native American groups have eaten Emory acorns traditionally, ceremonially, and in contemporary cuisine. The acorns are most commonly ground into meal.

Emory oak health and habitat have been challenged in 2020, including in Oak Flat, Arizona in the Tonto National Forest by the Resolution Copper mining company's large copper mine.

According to the United States Department of Agriculture:

Emory oak acorns are a critically important resource for Western Apache Tribal Nation, both as a food source and due to its cultural and ceremonial uses. For decades, Apache elders watched in frustration as groves produced less acorn yield and declined in overall health. The ... Emory oak Collaborative Tribal Restoration Initiative is restor[ing] and protect[ing] Emory oak stands ... to ensure the long-term persistence of Emory oak. Habitat loss, fire suppression, livestock grazing, groundwater reductions, species competition and climate change have all impacted the Emory oak population. This program uses tribal traditional ecological knowledge to guide goals and activities.
