= Grey oak =

Grey oak or gray oak is a common name that may refer to several plants including:

- Casuarina glauca
- Grevillea hilliana
- Several species of Quercus including:
  - Quercus grisea
  - Quercus leucotrichophora
  - Quercus turbinella

== See also ==
- Gray's oak, Quercus ambigua, a synonym of Quercus diversifolia
