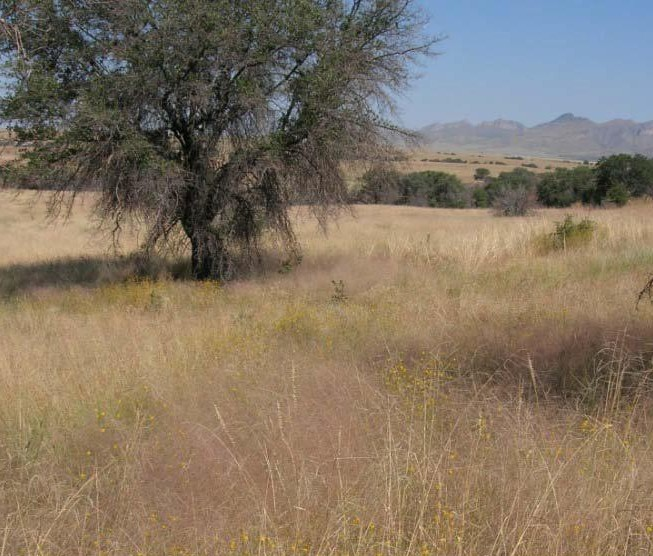
- Plains lovegrass in the foreground

Conservation status
- Secure (NatureServe)

Scientific classification
- Kingdom: Plantae
- Clade: Tracheophytes
- Clade: Angiosperms
- Clade: Monocots
- Clade: Commelinids
- Order: Poales
- Family: Poaceae
- Subfamily: Chloridoideae
- Genus: Eragrostis
- Species: E. intermedia

Binomial name
- Eragrostis intermedia Hitchc.

= Eragrostis intermedia =

Species of grass

Eragrostis intermedia is a species of grass known by the common name plains lovegrass. It is native to North and Central America, where it is distributed from the southeastern and southwestern United States south to Costa Rica. Its range may extend to South America.

This grass grows in tufts up to 90 centimeters tall, sometimes exceeding one meter. The leaves are up to 25 centimeters long. The inflorescence is a panicle with a pyramidal or ovate shape. The spikelets have up to 11 flowers each. The plant reproduces by seed or by sprouting from buds at the stem bases.

This plant grows in desert grassland, prairie, chaparral, shrubsteppe, pinyon-juniper woodland, and oak-dominated woodlands. It is often found in dry, sloping areas. It can take hold easily in disturbed habitat. It does best in sandy soil types, and areas with bimodal precipitation patterns, having wet seasons in winter and summer. In its native habitat it is one of the first plants to turn green in the spring. It has been observed to increase in abundance after wildfire.

This grass makes a good forage for livestock, but it decreases with overgrazing. Some game birds have been noted to eat the seeds.
