= Snakeweed =

List of plants with the same or similar names

Snakeweed or snakeweeds are a common name of many species of plant:

- Bistorta bistortoides, more commonly western bistort
- Bistorta officinalis, more commonly common bistort
- Conium maculatum, more commonly hemlock
- Euphorbia hirta, more commonly hairy spurge
- Gutierrezia, also matchweed
  - Gutierrezia sarothrae, more fully as broom snakeweed
- Stachytarpheta, in Australia
  - Stachytarpheta cayennensis as blue snakeweed
  - Stachytarpheta jamaicensis as light-blue snakeweed
  - Stachytarpheta urticifolia as dark blue snakeweed
