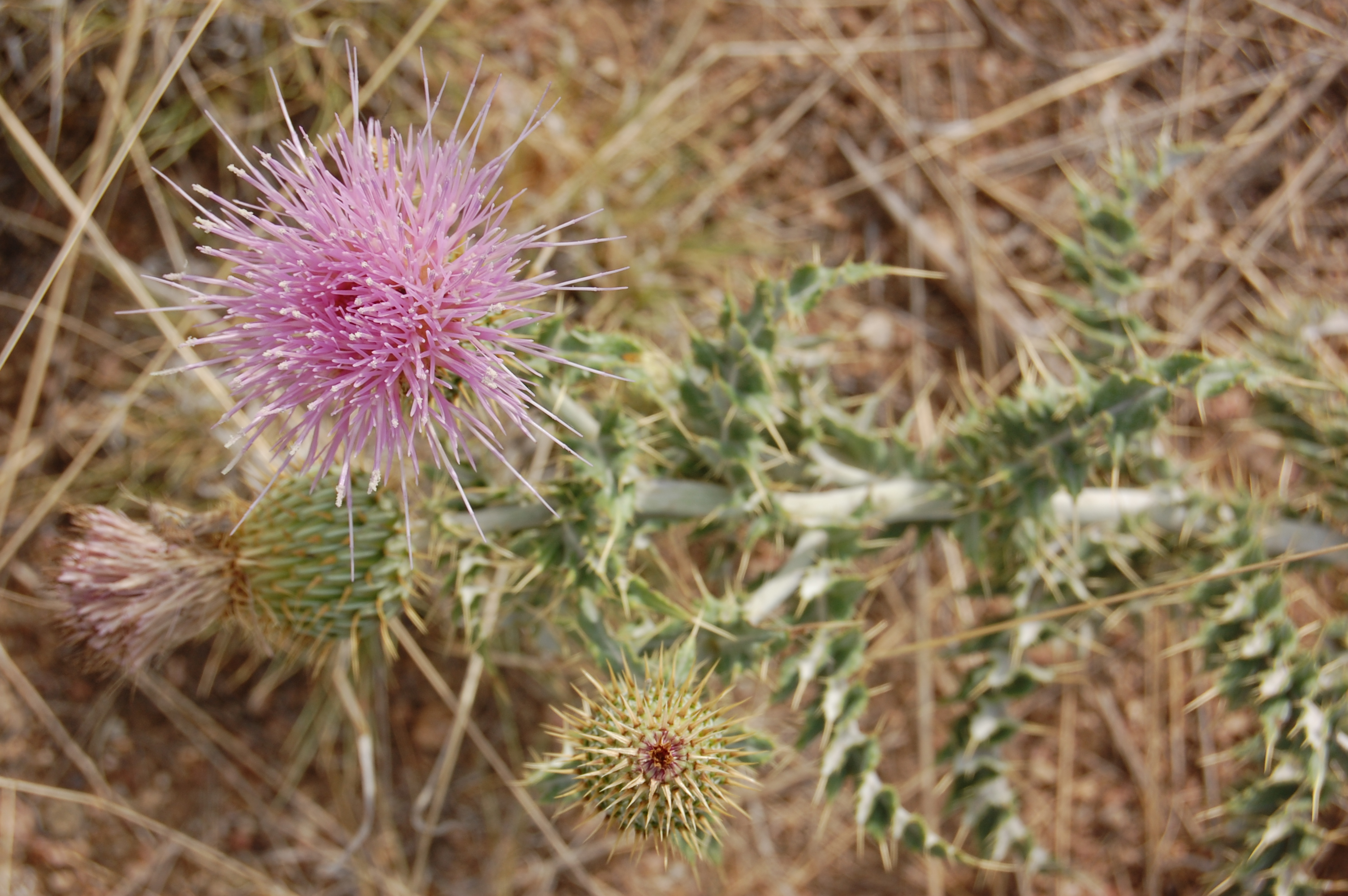

Conservation status
- Secure (NatureServe)

Scientific classification
- Kingdom: Plantae
- Clade: Tracheophytes
- Clade: Angiosperms
- Clade: Eudicots
- Clade: Asterids
- Order: Asterales
- Family: Asteraceae
- Genus: Cirsium
- Species: C. neomexicanum

Binomial name
- Cirsium neomexicanum Gray

Synonyms
- Synonymy: Carduus neomexicanus (A.Gray) Greene; Carduus nevadensis Greene; Cirsium arcuum A.Nelson; Cirsium canescens A.Gray; Cirsium humboldtense Rydb.; Cirsium nevadense (Greene) Petr. 1917 not Willk. 1859; Cirsium utahense Petr.; Cnicus neomexicanus (A.Gray) A.Gray

= Cirsium neomexicanum =

Species of thistle

Cirsium neomexicanum is a North American species of thistle known by the common names New Mexico thistle, powderpuff thistle, lavender thistle, foss thistle and desert thistle.

This plant is native to the southwestern United States and northwestern Mexico, particularly the Mojave and Sonoran Deserts. It has been found in California, Nevada, Arizona, Sonora, Utah, Colorado, New Mexico, and Texas.

== Description ==
Cirsium neomexicanum is a tall plant, routinely exceeding 2 metres (6 7/12 ft) in height. It erects a stem which may have webby fibers and long, stiff spines. The sparse leaves are greenish-gray, hairy, and very spiny.

Atop the mainly naked stems are inflorescences of one or more large flower heads with rounded bases and phyllaries covered in long, curving spines. The largest heads may be up to 5 centimeters (2 inches) in diameter. They are packed with white or lavender to pink disc florets but no ray florets.

The fruit is a flat brown achene with a long pappus which may reach 2 cm long. Unlike many other thistles, this species tends not to be a troublesome noxious weed.
