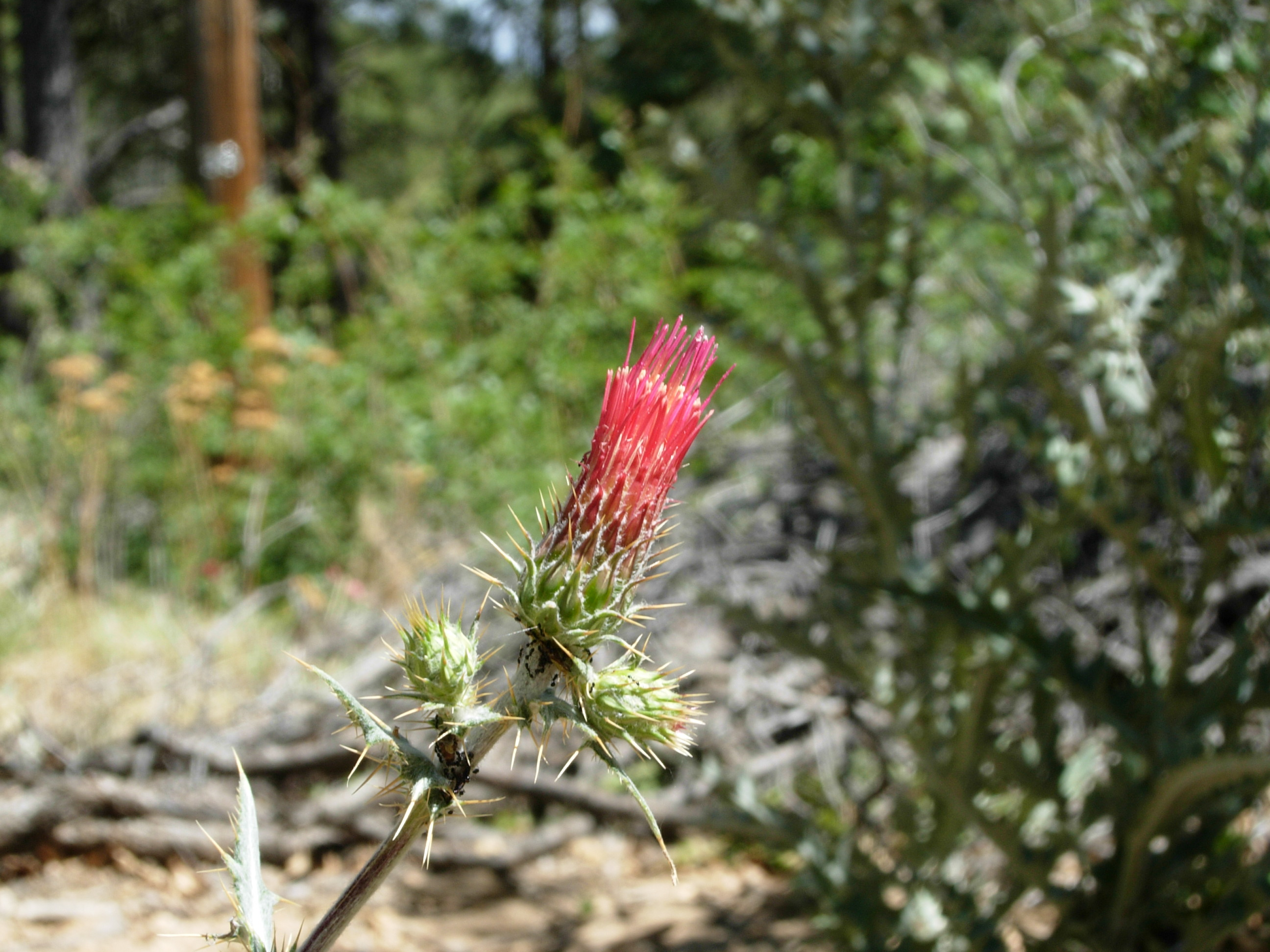

Conservation status
- Secure (NatureServe)

Scientific classification
- Kingdom: Plantae
- Clade: Tracheophytes
- Clade: Angiosperms
- Clade: Eudicots
- Clade: Asterids
- Order: Asterales
- Family: Asteraceae
- Genus: Cirsium
- Species: C. arizonicum

Binomial name
- Cirsium arizonicum (A.Gray) Petr.
- Natural range of Cirsium arizonicum, estimated with iNaturalist Geomodel

Synonyms
- Synonymy: Carduus arizonicus (A.Gray) Greene; Carduus nidulus (M.E.Jones) A.Heller; Cirsium nidulum (M.E.Jones) Petr.; Cnicus arizonicus A.Gray; Cnicus nidulus M.E.Jones; Cirsium effusum (Maxim.) Matsum.; Cnicus effusus Maxim.; Cirsium chellyense R.J.Moore & Frankton; Cirsium chuskaense R.J.Moore & Frankton; Cirsium navajoense R.J.Moore & Frankton; Carduus rothrockii (A.Gray) Greene; Cirsium rothrockii (A.Gray) Petr.; Cnicus rothrockii A.Gray

= Cirsium arizonicum =

Species of thistle

Cirsium arizonicum, the Arizona thistle, is a North American species of thistle in the family Asteraceae, native to the southwestern United States and northwestern Mexico. It has been found in Arizona, southeastern California, New Mexico, Nevada, Colorado, Utah, Sonora, and northwestern Chihuahua.

Cirsium arizonicum is a herbaceous plant that can be either biennial or perennial, reaching 30–150 cm in height. The spiny leaves are oblong-obovate with pinate lobes; the basal leaves are larger, 10–40 cm long, while leaves on the upper stem can be only 3 cm long. The inflorescence is 3–4 cm in length and 1.5–2 cm diameter, red to pink or purple, with all the florets of similar form (no division into disc and ray florets); individual plants are very variable in the number of heads produced, from one to 100. Flowering is from mid spring to mid fall. The species occurs in mountains, at elevations of 900–3,600 m.

Five varieties have been identified:

- Cirsium arizonicum var. arizonicum (syn. var. nidulum (M.E.Jones) S.L.Welsh) – Arizona, New Mexico, California, Nevada, Utah, Sonora, Chihuahua
- Cirsium arizonicum var. bipinnatum (Eastwood) D.J.Keil. Four Corners thistle – Arizona, New Mexico, Colorado, Utah, Sonora
- Cirsium arizonicum var. chellyense (R.J.Moore & Frankton) D.J.Keil (syn. C. chellyense R.J.Moore & Frankton) Navajo thistle – Arizona, New Mexico
- Cirsium arizonicum var. rothrockii (A.Gray) D.J.Keil (syn. C. rothrockii (A.Gray) Petrak). Rothrock's thistle – Arizona, New Mexico, Sonora; this variety is found on both rims of the Grand Canyon and for a short distance below.
- Cirsium arizonicum var. tenuisectum D.J.Keil. Desert mountains thistle – California, Nevada, Sonora
