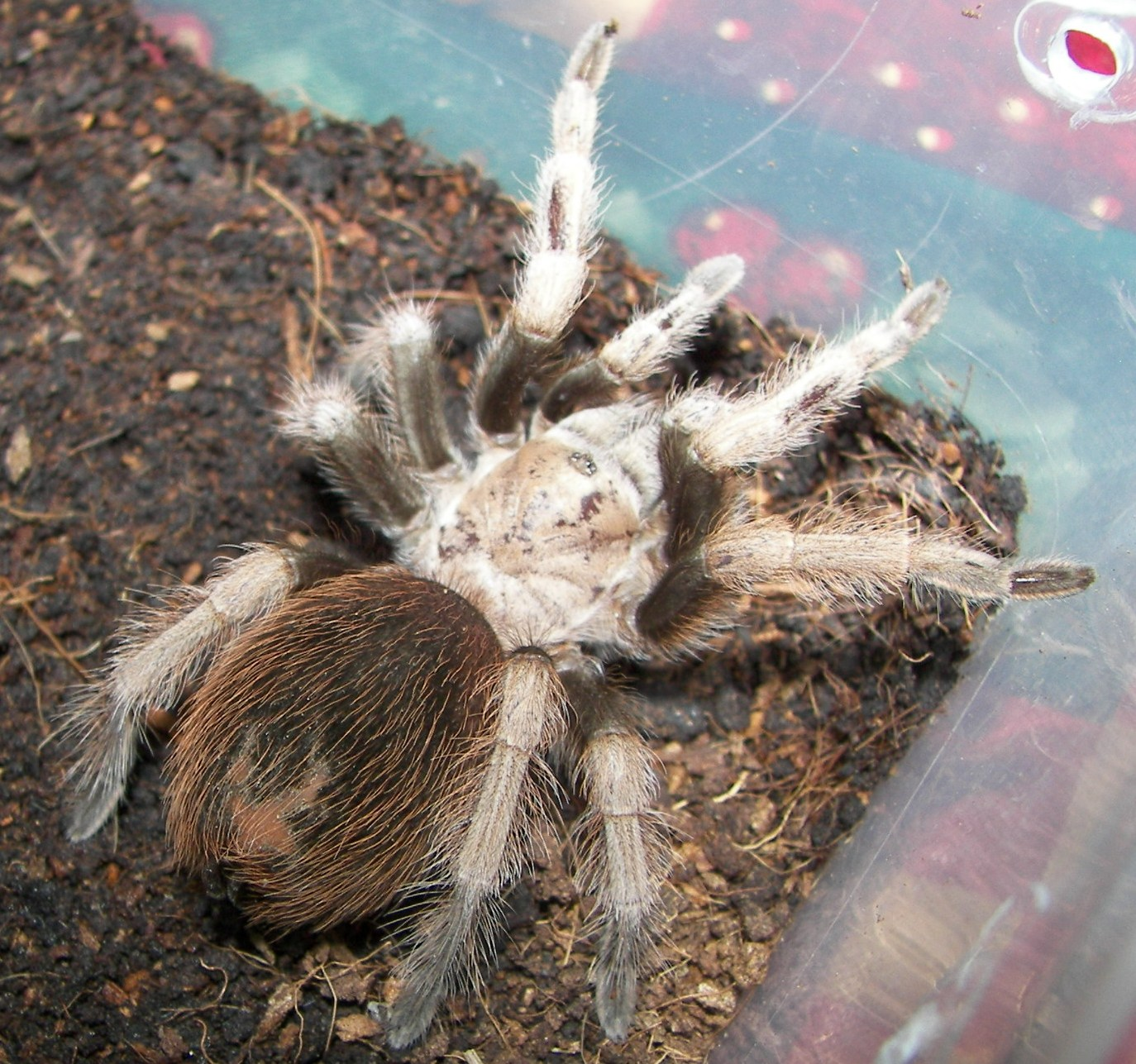

Scientific classification
- Kingdom: Animalia
- Phylum: Arthropoda
- Subphylum: Chelicerata
- Class: Arachnida
- Order: Araneae
- Infraorder: Mygalomorphae
- Family: Theraphosidae
- Genus: Aphonopelma
- Species: A. chalcodes

Binomial name
- Aphonopelma chalcodes Chamberlin, 1940

Synonyms
- Aphonopelma apacheum Chamberlin, 1940; Aphonopelma rothi Smith, 1995; Aphonopelma schmidti Smith, 1995; Aphonopelma stahnkei Smith, 1995

= Aphonopelma chalcodes =

Species of spider

Aphonopelma chalcodes, commonly known as the western desert tarantula, desert blonde tarantula, Arizona blonde tarantula or Mexican blonde tarantula, is a species of spider belonging to the family Theraphosidae. It has a limited distribution in the deserts of Arizona and adjacent parts of Mexico but can be very common within this range. The common name "blonde tarantula" refers to the carapace, which is densely covered in pale hairs, and contrasts strongly with the all-dark legs and abdomen. Additionally, these spiders have low toxicity, a long life expectancy, and several offspring.

== Description ==
This 3 to 5 in (8 to 13 cm) large bodied, burrowing spider is commonly seen during the summer rainy season in southwestern deserts. The female is usually a uniform tan color. The male has black legs, a copper-colored cephalothorax and a reddish abdomen. The female body length is up to 56 mm, males only reaching 44 mm. Their burrows can be as large as 1 to 2 in (25 to 51 mm) in diameter, with some strands of silk across the opening.

Multiple lectins have been detected in the serum of Aphonopelma chalcodes. Simply, lectins are proteins that bind to carbohydrates. Research studies illustrate that the lectins within the serum of A. chalcodes have the ability to bind to sialic acid. The function of sialic acids is diverse, including contributing significantly to protein folding, neural development, and metabolism. However, the implications of the lectins binding to sialic acid must be investigated further.

=== Visual system ===
The visual system of A. chalcodes is critical to its survival as spiders rely on their spectral sensitivity and visual acuity in order to survive. These spiders have two sets of eyes, referred to as the primary and secondary sets. Spectral sensitivity within these eyes is critical as it is essential in distinguishing different wavelengths. The peak response amplitudes of these spiders were directly correlated to the intensity of light that was exhibited. However, it was also found that the period of depolarizations, pertaining to receptor potentials, was longer for longer flashes.

Additionally, the spectral sensitivity of the species was assessed. The range of wavelength sensitivity in all ocular cells was between 350 and 640 nm. The most sensitive spectral sensitivity was around 500 nm and the least sensitive point was at 640 nm. Both the primary and secondary sets of eyes had very similar spectral sensitivities and waveforms. Research studies have demonstrated that the receptor potentials of the tarantula photoreceptors in response to light flashes was characterized by smooth depolarizations. Lastly, secondary eyes in these spiders have tapeta, which are used to amplify and detect dim light more effectively than primary light. The function of both the primary and secondary eyes in A. chalcodes resembles the functions of rods and cones in other vertebrates.

=== Molting ===
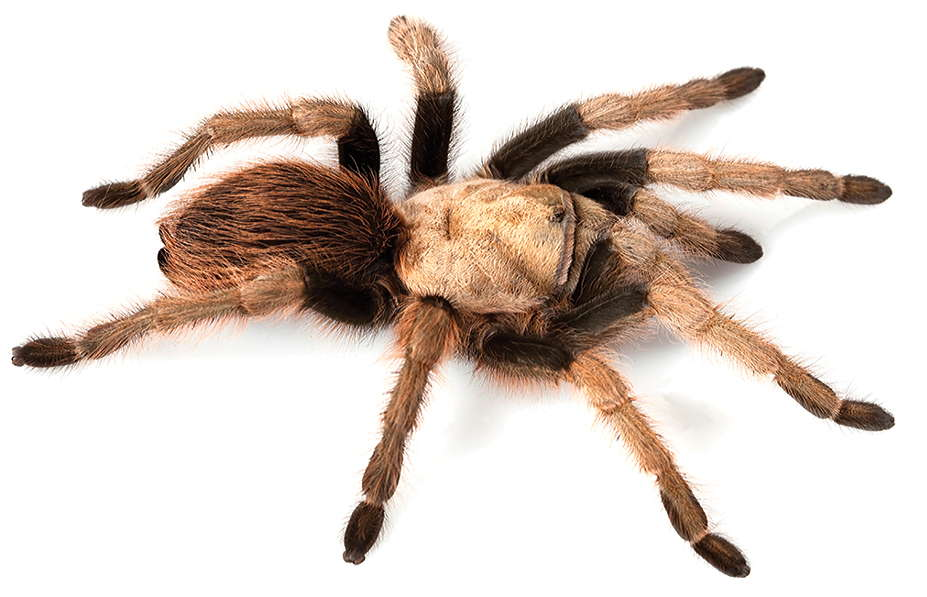
Female

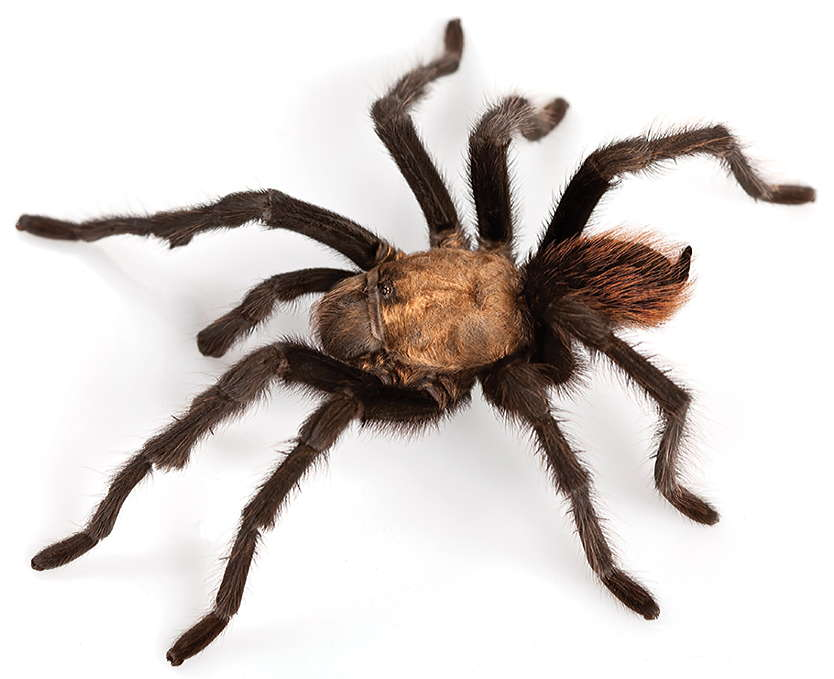
Male

Molting is a biological process that invertebrates often go through. Molting in spiders consists of shedding the exoskeleton and forming a new covering through different developmental stages. This process allows spiders to grow as they go through different stages of development. The molting of A. chalcodes has been determined to occur through ten primary stages, with a total of twenty-five molts occurring over a two-year period. Each stage of molting corresponds to shedding of a different portion of their exoskeleton ranging from the dorsum to the abdomen and ultimately the legs. Additionally, each stage of molting does not take the same amount of time, with the first stage being the most extensive.

Additionally, tarantulas are able to molt any time of the day. Research studies have illustrated that molting is not restricted by any time of day. Although molting is not dependent on the time of day, it is seasonally dependent. In A. chalcodes, molting is especially apparent during March and April. The reason for why tarantulas tend to molt during spring are not currently known, however it has been established that is seasonally dependent.

=== Reproduction and development ===
The spider undergoes sexual differentiation later in development, as it is born resembling a female. After several years, the spider may begin to display male traits after further differentiation. Male A. chalcodes develop palpal bulbs, intended to store sperm and insert it into the female's genital opening. Females possess abdominal pouches (spermatheca) that are utilized in order to store sperm until reproduction occurs through the laying of eggs. When reproduction occurs, females lay eggs in the male's sperm in order to provide nutrients for the offspring. The average number of offspring is 600, with an average gestation period of about six to seven weeks.

The life expectancy of an average A. chalcodes is about 24–30 years for females, and 5–10 years for males. This is highly dependent on the habitat and respective development of each spider, however in general, one can expect a high life expectancy in this particular species. The significantly higher life expectancy for females in comparison to males can be attributed to differences in development and reproductive organs.

== Distribution, habitat and lifestyle ==
Aphonopelma chalcodes, the western desert tarantula, occupies several states within the southwestern United States. Specifically, these spiders are known to be common in New Mexico and Arizona within the United States.

This spider often lives in desert soil and is resistant to harsh weather. These spiders often reside in burrows which they create for themselves. These burrows are very deep in order to help the spider resist and adapt to fluctuations in environmental temperature. However, when temperatures are between 23˚C and 31˚C, these spiders leave the burrows into the general outdoors. A. chalcodes makes residence in burrows through digging under a stone or living in isolated burrows that are not being used. The entrance to the burrow is surrounded by strands of silk, which allow the spider to detect that prey are present while it is hiding in the burrow.

The nocturnal activity of this spider begins when the silk covering surrounding the burrow is broken. Potential reasons explaining the breaking of the silk covering include the spider's circadian rhythm, decreased environmental light intensity, and surface temperatures. During the night, tarantulas remain inside the burrow entrance expecting the arrival of prey. At dawn, the tarantula goes into the burrow. Although A. chalcodes is particularly active at night, it is not strictly nocturnal because they are seen in the upper portion of the burrow early in the day.

== Toxicity ==
In general, spider venoms contain several classifications of neurotoxins that are relevant to the development of insecticides and other pharmaceutical preventative measures. Specifically, the venom of A. chalcodes contains two compounds referred to as Apc600 and Apc728. Analysis of these neurotoxins within the venom revealed the presence of spermine, a polyamine involved in cellular metabolism, and 1,3-diaminopropane. These toxins have not been investigated significantly, however are theorized to function in short term paralysis or immobilization of the tarantulas' prey.

The venom of A. chalcodes is not highly dangerous to humans. When compared to a bee sting, the level of venom is not significantly higher. Specifically, these spiders are one of the least dangerous within their family of Theraphosidae.

== As pets ==
They are popular among beginner tarantula keepers due to their long lifespan (5–10 years for males, up to 30 years for females) and docile nature.
