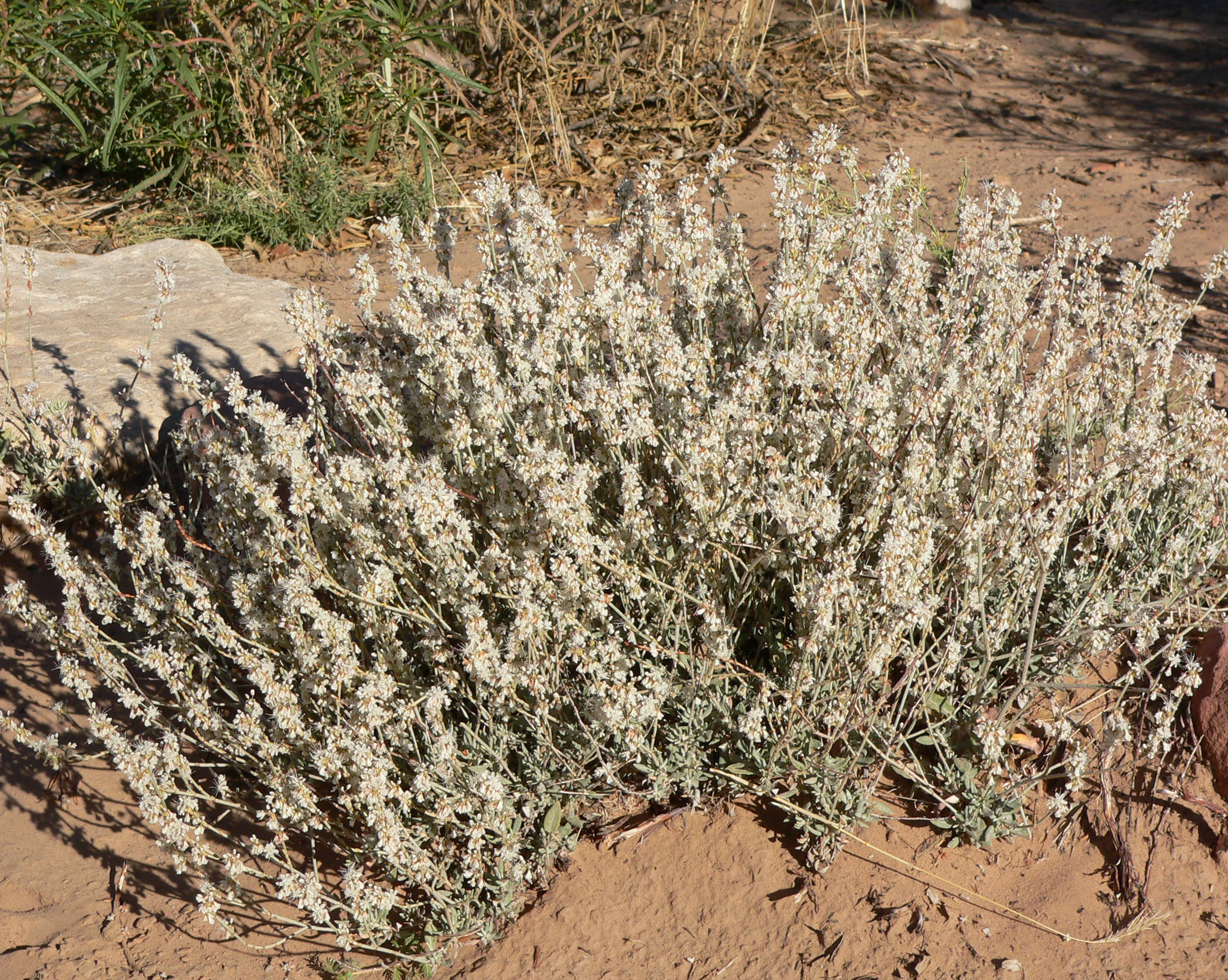
- var. wrightii in southern Nevada

Scientific classification
- Kingdom: Plantae
- Clade: Tracheophytes
- Clade: Angiosperms
- Clade: Eudicots
- Order: Caryophyllales
- Family: Polygonaceae
- Genus: Eriogonum
- Species: E. wrightii

Binomial name
- Eriogonum wrightii Torr. ex. Benth.

= Eriogonum wrightii =

Species of wild buckwheat

Eriogonum wrightii is a species of wild buckwheat known by the common names bastardsage and Wright's buckwheat. It is native to the Southwestern United States, California, and northwest Mexico, where it grows in many plant communities, such as chaparral, in rocky habitats from mountains to deserts.

== Description ==
It is quite variable in appearance; it may be a small perennial herb 10 centimeters tall or a bushy shrub over a meter wide. There are several varieties as well. In general it has basal leaves as well as a few leaves along the stem, which are usually narrow and woolly. The inflorescence has long, straight branches which may be hairless to woolly and have flower clusters and sometimes small leaves at the nodes. The flowers are usually white to light pink.

== Taxonomy ==
=== Varieties ===
Sources:

- Eriogonum wrightii var. brevifolium Reveal (San Borja buckwheat) – An uncommon endemic from the Sierra de San Borja in Baja California to the Tres Vírgenes in Baja California Sur.
- Eriogonum wrightii var. dentatum (S. Stokes) Reveal (La Mision buckwheat) – A rare endemic occurring along the mesas and bluffs above the Pacific coast between La Mision and Ensenada, Baja California.
- Eriogonum wrightii var. linearifolium Reveal (Linear-leaf island buckwheat) – A rare endemic existing on Angel de la Guarda Island in the Gulf of California.
- Eriogonum wrightii var. membranaceum S. Stokes ex Jeps. (Foothill buckwheat, Ring-stem buckwheat) – In Mexico, this variety occurs in the upper foothills and mountains of the Sierra de Juarez and the Sierra de San Pedro Martir and disjunctly to the south in the Sierra La Asamblea. In the United States, it is found in California, occurring primarily in the Peninsular Ranges.
- Eriogonum wrightii var. nodosum (Small) Reveal (Knot-stem buckwheat, bastardsage) – A rare variety occurring in the more arid portions of the southwest. In Mexico, it occurs in Sonora, and the Baja California Peninsula, on the Sierra de Juarez and Sierra de San Pedro Martir south to the Sierra de San Borja in Baja California and on the Cerro Azufre in Baja California Sur. In the United States, it is found in Arizona and California.
- Eriogonum wrightii var. olanchense (J.T. Howell) Reveal
- Eriogonum wrightii var. oresbium Reveal (San Pedro Martir buckwheat) – An uncommon variety endemic to the Sierra de Juarez and the Sierra de San Pedro Martir in Baja California, Mexico. Differs from all other forms of the species with its broadly elliptic to nearly oval leaf blades.
- Eriogonum wrightii var. subscaposum S. Watson
- Eriogonum wrightii var. taxifolium (Greene) Parish (Yew-leaf buckwheat) – A rare variety endemic to Cedros Island, but also on the Punta Baja near El Rosario in Baja California.
- Eriogonum wrightii var. trachygonum (Torr. ex Benth.) Jeps.
