= Plants of the Sierra de Manantlán Biosphere Reserve =

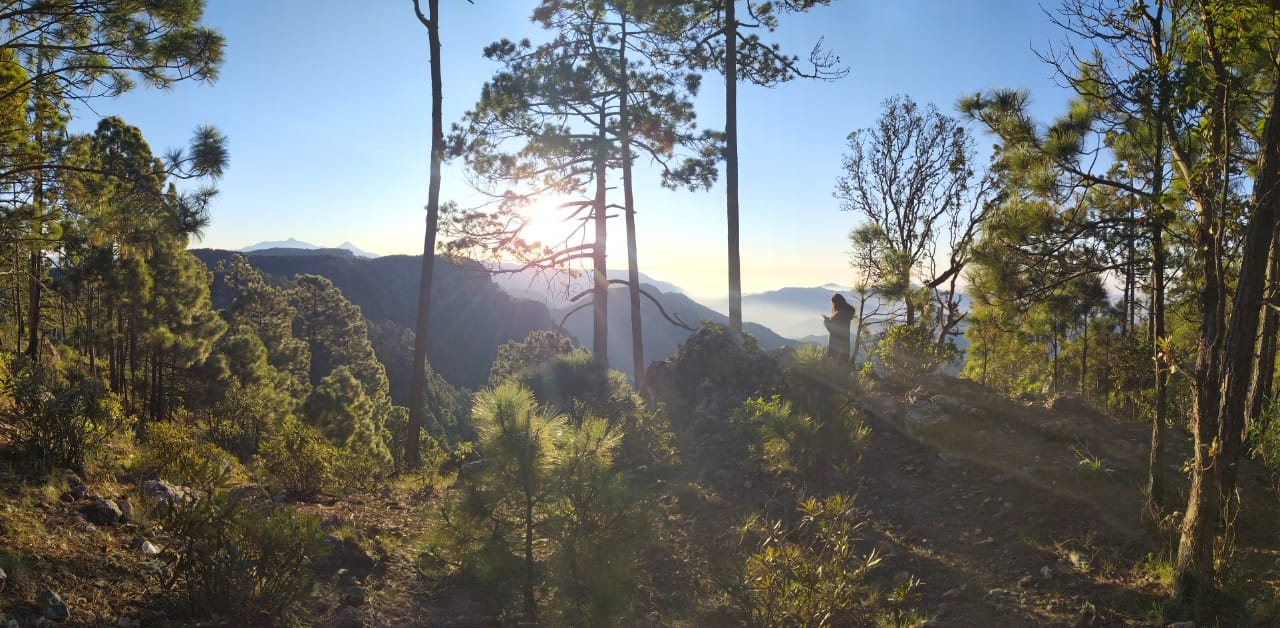
Sierra de Manantlán Biosphere Reserve picture

This is a list of plants found in the Sierra de Manantlán Biosphere Reserve. The reserve straddles the Mexican states of Colima and Jalisco. It is located in the transition between the Nearctic and Neotropical realms and encompasses parts of the Sierra Madre del Sur, with a wide range of altitudes, climates and soils. The effects of tectonic and volcanic activities and erosion are notable within the reserve.

== Ecological characteristics ==
=== General characteristics ===
Forest types in the reserve including mesophytic, cloud, dry deciduous and semi-deciduous tropical forests. Anthropologists know the region as Zona de Occidente, an area notably different from the rest of Mesoamerica. Some ceramic remnants, figurines and graves have been found, but there is little other material evidence of ancient human settlement. As of 1995 almost 8,000 people lived in the Sierra de Manantlán Reserve, engaged mainly in agriculture (corn, beans, tomatoes, sugar cane, watermelon, mangoes), livestock grazing, timber production, and extraction of wood for fuel and mining of coal or minerals. Another 30,000 lived in the surrounding communities and almost 700,000 in the surrounding region.

==== Location and geography ====
The Sierra de Manantlán Biosphere Reserve is located to the extreme north of the inter-tropical zone. The climate in the region is influenced by its proximity to the coast, the effect of its landform (orographic shade) and the breadth of its altitudinal range. These characteristics explain the high biodiversity and the presence of numerous plant formations ranging from tropical forests to temperate-cold climates.

=== Birds and mammals ===
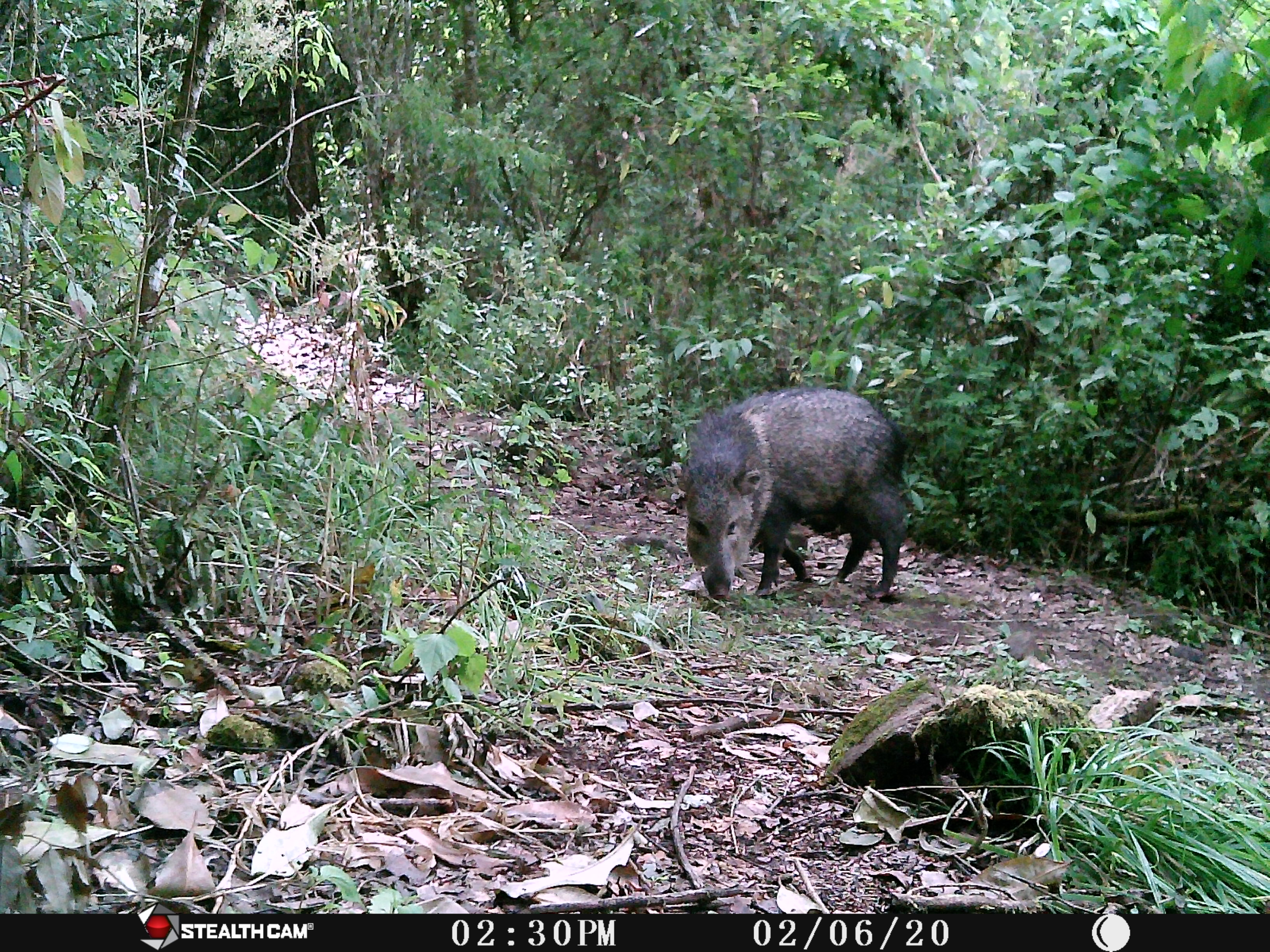
Dicotyles angulatus

The Sierra de Manantlán's varied and complex plant cover harbours a great wealth of flora. There are over 2900 species of vascular plants belonging to 981 genera. Wildlife is one of the important components of the high biodiversity in this reserve. Among the main values of the Sierra de Manantlán, in addition to its great wealth of species and its unique biogeographical characteristics, particular mention should be made of the presence of endangered or useful endemic species. So far 110 mammal species have been reported, including the Mexican vole subspecies Microtus mexicanus neveriae, the pocket gopher Cratogeomys gymnurus russelli, the oncilla, jaguarandi, ocelot, puma, bobcat, jaguar and four species of nectarivorous bats.

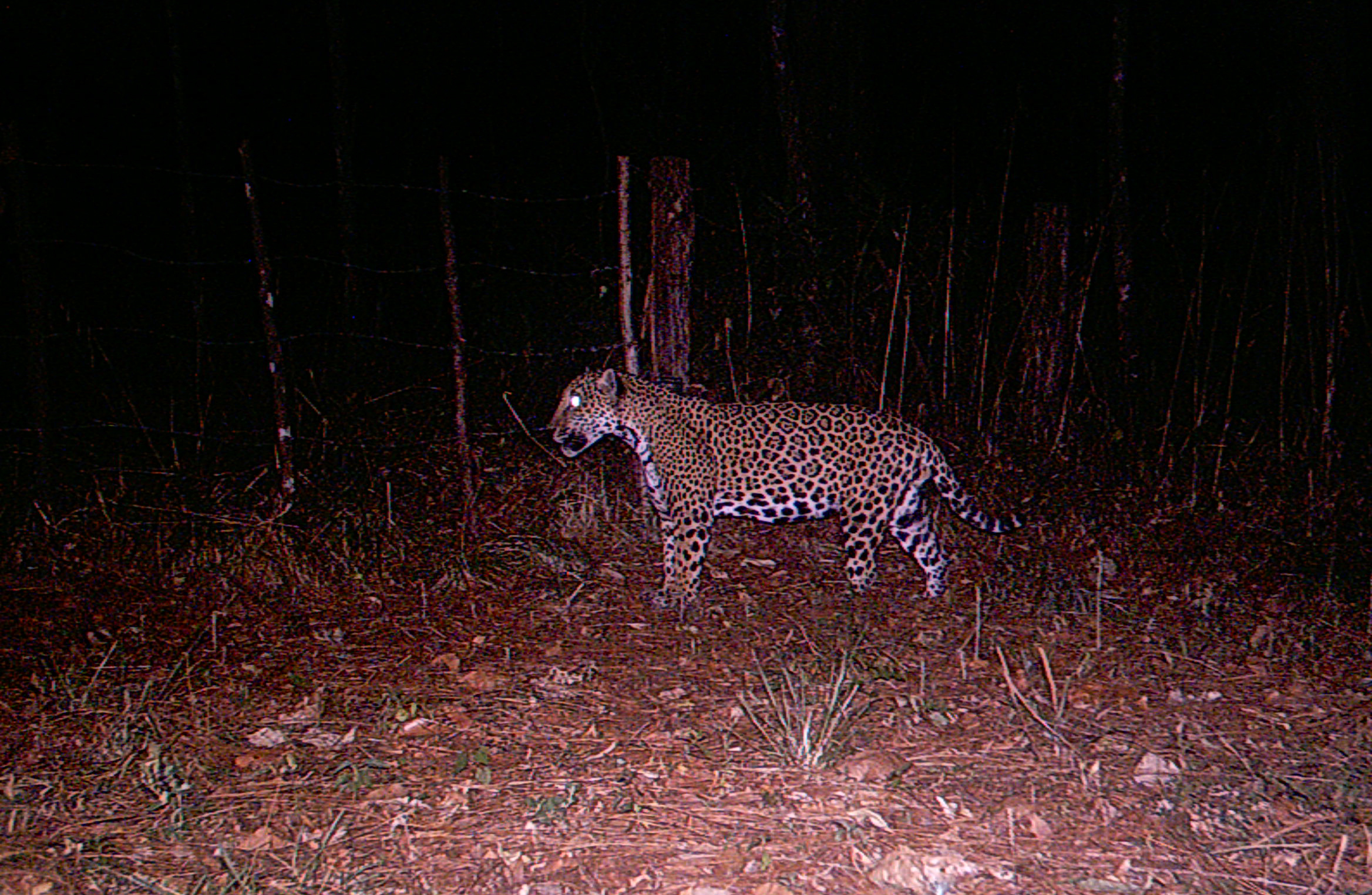

There are 336 bird species which have been reported, among them are 36 which are endemic to Mexico, such as the charismatic species: crested guan (Penelope purpurascens), military macaw (Ara militaris), red-lored amazon (Amazona autumnalis) and the Mexican national symbol, the golden eagle. In terms of herpetofauna, 85 species have been recorded; of these 13 are endemic to the western and central region of Mexico: rattlesnake, black iguana, frog Shyrrhopus modestus, beaded lizard (Heloderma horridum) and the Autlan rattlesnake (Crotalus lannomi), an endemic species only reported for the area of Puerto de Los Mazos. Of the 16 species of fish identified, 13 are native and four are endemic to the region.

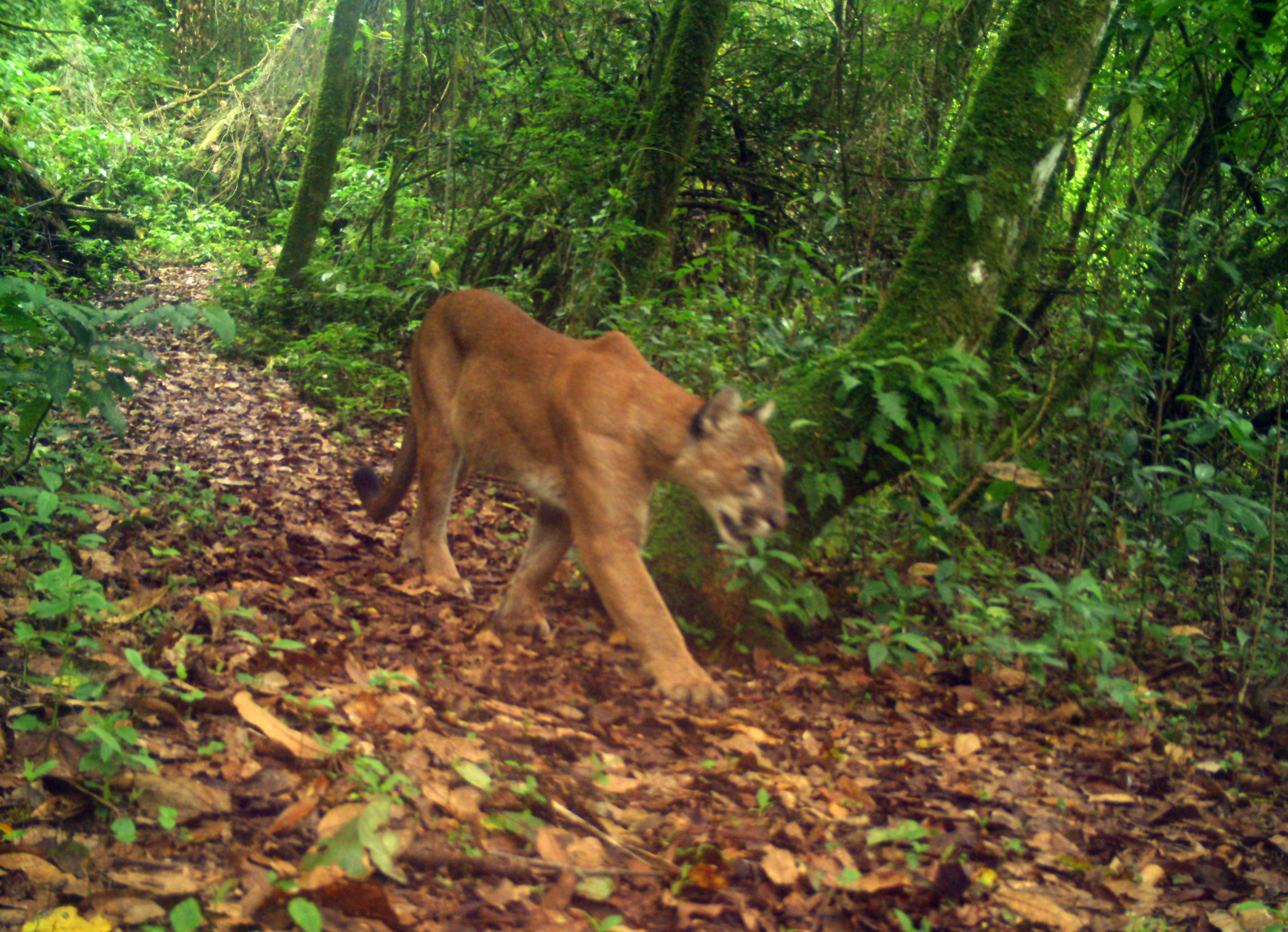
Jaguar

Most plants in the list below can be found in Flora de Manantlán, and that should be assumed as a reference when no other is indicated. References to other sources are included where found. The herbarium web pages at the National Autonomous University of Mexico and at the Missouri Botanical Garden are used as authorities for names with adjustments for the system in use by Wikipedia. Species include ecosystem, growth habit, and common names where available.

== Cycads ==
=== Zamiaceae ===
- Zamia loddigesii: a shrub or Spanish: arbusto

== Coniferae ==
Pines and their allies.

=== Cupressaceae ===
==== Cupressus ====
- Cupressus lusitanica: a tree or árbol – found in pine forest and pine-fir forest – called Mexican white cedar, cedar-of-Goa, cypress, in Spanish cipres, cedro, cedro blanco

=== Pinaceae ===
==== Abies ====
- Abies guatemalensis: tree
- Abies religiosa: tree – cloud forest, pine-fir forest – sacred fir, oyamel, pinabete

==== Pinus ====
- Pinus devoniana: tree
- Pinus gordoniana (syn. P. douglasiana): tree – cloud forest, pine-oak forest, pine forest – pino
- Pinus durangensis: tree
- Pinus herrerae: tree – pine-oak forest, pine forest – pino chino
- Pinus leiophylla: tree
- Pinus maximinoi: tree – ocote
- Pinus montezumae: tree
- Pinus oocarpa: tree – pine-oak forest, pine forest
- Pinus pseudostrobus: tree – pine forest, pine-fir forest – pino ocote, chamite, pachingo

=== Podocarpaceae ===
==== Podocarpus ====
- Podocarpus matudae: tree

== Monocotyledons or Liliopsida ==
=== Cyperaceae ===
==== Cyperus ====
- Cyperus hermaphroditus

=== Graminea or Poaceae ===
==== Festuca ====
- Festuca breviglumis

=== Liliaceae or Asparagaceae ===
==== Agave ====
- Agave maximiliana

==== Otatea ====
- Otatea acuminata – otatillo rodillon
- Otatea aztecorum

==== Piptochaetium ====
- Piptochaetium virescens

==== Zea ====
- Zea diploperennis – milpilla

=== Smilacaceae ===
==== Smilax ====
- Smilax domingensis

=== Typhaceae ===
==== Typha ====
- Typha domingensis

== Magnoliopsida or Dicotyledons ==
Flowering plants

=== Acanthaceae ===
==== Aphelandra ====
- Aphelandra lineariloba: shrub
- Aphelandra madrensis: shrub

==== Barleria ====
- Barleria micans: shrub

==== Dicliptera ====
- Dicliptera resupinata: herb

==== Dyschoriste ====
- Dyschoriste hirsutissima: herb – herbabuenilla, hierbabuenita
- Dyschoriste saltuensis: herb
- Dyschoriste rubiginosa or D. angustifolia: herb

==== Elytraria ====
- Elytraria imbricata: herb

==== Henrya ====
- Henrya insularis: herb
- Henrya tuberculosperma: herb

==== Justicia or Jacobinia ====
- Jacobinia mexicana: herb
- Justicia aurea: herb
- Justicia candicans: herb
- Justicia reflexiflora: herb
- Justicia salviiflora: herb
- Justicia spicigera: herb

==== Pseuderanthemum ====
- Pseuderanthemum praecox: herb
- Pseuderanthemum standleyi: herb

==== Ruellia ====
- Ruellia bourgaei: shrub
- Ruellia jaliscana: shrub
- Ruellia mcvaughii: shrub
- Ruellia novogaliciana: shrub
- Ruellia spissa: herb
- Ruellia stemonacanthoides: herb

==== Tetramerium ====
- Tetramerium glandulosum: herb
- Tetramerium nervosum: herb
- Tetramerium tenuissimum: herb

==== Ruellia or Blechum ====
- Blechum brownei: herb

=== Actinidiaceae ===
==== Saurauia ====
- Saurauia serrata: tree – mamey

=== Aizoaceae or Molluginaceae ===
==== Mollugo ====
- Mollugo verticillata

==== Trianthema ====
- Trianthema portulacastrum: herb

=== Amaranthaceae ===
==== Achyranthes ====
- Achyranthes aspera: herb – hierba de sapo

==== Alternanthera ====
- Alternanthera achyrantha: herb

==== Amaranthus ====
- Amaranthus cruentus: herb
- Amaranthus dubius: herb – quielite, plante de puerco, quielite blanco
- Amaranthus hybridus: herb – quielite
- Amaranthus palmeri: herb – quielite
- Amaranthus polygonoides: herb
- Amaranthus spinosus: herb – quelite espinoso

==== Celosia ====
- Celosia orcutti: herb

==== Chamissoa ====
- Chamissoa altissima: herb – hierba del arlomo

==== Froelichia ====
- Froelichia interrupta: herb

==== Gomphrena ====
- Gomphrena decumbens: herb

==== Iresine ====
- Iresine angustifolia: herb – hierba del arlomo
- Iresine calea: herb
- Iresine cassiniiformis: herb
- Iresine diffusa: herb – hierba del arlomo
- Iresine hartmanii: herb
- Iresine interrupta: herb – hierba del arlomo
- Iresine nigra: herb – hierba del arlomo

==== Lagrezia ====
- Lagrezia monosperma: herb

==== Pleuropetalum ====
- Pleuropetalum sprucei: herb

=== Anacardiaceae ===
==== Amphipterygium ====
- Amphipterygium adstringens

==== Astronium ====
- Astronium graveolenss

==== Cyrtocarpa ====
- Cyrtocarpa procera

==== Pistacia ====
- Pistacia mexicana: tree – pistache

==== Pseudosmodingium ====
- Pseudosmodingium perniciosum

==== Rhus ====
- Rhus pachyrrhachis
- Rhus schmidelioides
- Rhus terebinthifolia

==== Spondias ====
- Spondias purpurea: tree – ciruela cimmarona, jocote

==== Toxicodendron ====
- Toxicodendron radicans: vine – yedra
- Toxicodendron radicans var. divaricatum: vine – yedra

=== Apiaceae ===
==== Eryngium ====
- Eryngium palmeri

=== Annonaceae ===
==== Annona ====
- Annona cherimola: tree – cherimoya
- Annona longifolia: tree – anona
- Annona muricata: tree – guanábana, soursop
- Annona purpurea: tree – cabezo, cabeza de negro, soncoya, sincuya
- Annona reticulata: tree – anona, anonilla, hilama
- Annona squamosa: tree – sugar apple

=== Apocynaceae or Asclepiadaceae ===
==== Asclepias ====
- Asclepias angustifolia: herb
- Asclepias auriculata: herb
- Asclepias contrayerba: herb
- Asclepias crocea: herb
- Asclepias curassavica: herb – caldrona, chichi de burra, diente de perro
- Asclepias glaucescens: herb
- Asclepias mcvaughii: herb
- Asclepias ovata: herb – chichis de burra
- Asclepias pellucida: herb
- Asclepias pringlei: herb
- Asclepias sp. nov.: herb

==== Blepharodon ====
- Blepharodon mucronatum: vine

==== Cryptostegia ====
- Cryptostegia grandiflora: vine – rubber vine, jasmin

==== Cynanchum ====
- Cynanchum foetidum: vine
- Cynanchum jaliscanum: vine
- Cynanchum ligulatum: vine
- Cynanchum unifarium: vine
- Cynanchum sp. nov.: vine

==== Funastrum ====
(Formerly Sarcostemma)

- Funastrum bilobum: vine
- Funastrum clausum: vine
- Funastrum elegans: vine
- Funastrum heterophyllum: vine
- Funastrum pannosum: vine

==== Gonolobus ====
- Gonolobus chloranthus: vine
- Gonolobus jaliscensis: vine
- Gonolobus macranthus: vine
- Gonolobus sp. nov. 1: vine
- Gonolobus sp. nov. 2: vine

==== Marsdenia ====
- Marsdenia astephanoides: vine
- Marsdenia lanata: vine
- Marsdenia mexicana: vine

==== Matelea ====
- Matelea aspera: vine
- Matelea balbisii: vine
- Matelea chrysantha: vine
- Matelea crenata: vine
- Matelea cyclophylla: vine
- Matelea dictyantha: vine
- Matelea pavonii: vine
- Matelea quirosii: vine
- Matelea sp.: vine
- Matelea sp. nov.: vine

==== Mellichampia ====
- Mellichampia sp.: vine

==== Metastelma ====
- Metastelma sp.: vine

=== Apocynaceae ===
==== Alstonia ====
- Alstonia longifolia: tree

==== Haplophyton ====
- Haplophyton cinereum: herb

==== Laubertia ====
- Laubertia contorta

==== Mandevilla ====
- Mandevilla andrieuxii: vine
- Mandevilla foliosa: vine
- Mandevilla subsagittata: vine
- Mandevilla syrinx: vine

==== Plumeria ====
- Plumeria obtusa: shrub – cacalote, fragipani
- Plumeria rubra: shrub – fragipani, mata de jardin

==== Prestonia ====
- Prestonia mexicana: shrub

==== Rauvolfia ====
- Rauvolfia canescens:
- Rauvolfia tetraphylla: shrub

==== Stemmadenia ====
- Stemmadenia donnell-smithii: shrub – San Antonio
- Stemmadenia tomentosa: shrub – cabrito, rosa amarilla, San Antonio

==== Tabernaemontana ====
- Tabernaemontana alba: shrub

==== Thenardia ====
- Thenardia floribunda: tree

==== Thevetia ====
- Thevetia ovata: shrub

==== Vallesia ====
- Vallesia sp. nov.

==== Vinca ====
- Vinca major: perennial groundcover – quebra plato

=== Aquifoliaceae ===
==== Ilex ====
- Ilex brandegeana: cloud forest
- Ilex tolucana: ivy

=== Araliaceae ===
==== Aralia ====
- Aralia humilis: tree – guardalagua

==== Dendropanax ====
- Dendropanax arboreus: cloud forest

==== Oreopanax ====
- Oreopanax echinops: tree – mano de leon
- Oreopanax peltatus: tree
- Oreopanax santanderianus: tree
- Oreopanax xalapensis: tree – cloud forest

=== Aristolochiaceae ===
==== Aristolochia ====
- Aristolochia buntingii: vine
- Aristolochia foetida: vine
- Aristolochia malacophylla: vine
- Aristolochia styloglossa: vine – tecopaste
- Aristolochia taliscana: vine – guaco, pacueco
- Aristolochia tequilana: vine – contrahierba

=== Balsaminaceae ===
==== Impatiens ====
- Impatiens balsamina: herb – belen

=== Basellaceae ===
==== Anredera ====
- Anredera vesicaria: vine

=== Begoniaceae ===
==== Begonia ====
- Begonia balmisiana: herb – calidonia
- Begonia biserrata: herb
- Begonia calderonii: herb
- Begonia gracilis: annual herb
- Begonia heracleifolia: herb
- Begonia lachaoensis: herb
- Begonia monophylla: herb
- Begonia oaxacana: herb
- Begonia ornithophylla: herb
- Begonia plebeja: herb
- Begonia stigmosa: herb
- Begonia uruapensis: herb
- Begonia sp. 1: herb
- Begonia sp. 2: herb
- Begonia sp. 3: herb

=== Berberidaceae ===
==== Berberis ====
- Berberis incerta: shrub

=== Betulaceae ===
==== Alnus ====
- Alnus acuminata arguta: tree – aile
- Alnus jorullensis: tree – pine-oak forest, pine forest – aile
- Alnus jorullensis lutea: tree – palo de casa

==== Carpinus ====
- Carpinus tropicalis: cloud forest, pine-oak forest – mora blanca

==== Ostrya ====
- Ostrya virginiana: cloud forest – mora, mora rojo

=== Bignoniaceae ===
==== Amphilophium ====
- Amphilophium paniculatum: vine
- Amphilophium paniculatum paniculatum: vine

==== Astianthus ====
- Astianthus viminalis: shrub – achuchil, sabino,

==== Crescentia ====
- Crescentia alata: shrub tree – cuastecomate

==== Distictis ====
- Distictis buccinatoria: shrub tree – cuije

==== Melloa ====
- Melloa quadrivalvis: shrub tree – piene de chango, lengua de vaca

==== Pithecoctenium ====
- Pithecoctenium crucigerum: shrub tree

==== Tabebuia ====
- Tabebuia chrysantha: shrub – primavera
- Tabebuia rosea: shrub – rosa morada

==== Tecoma ====
- Tecoma stans: shrub – flor de noche, tronadora

=== Bixaceae ===
==== Bixa ====
- Bixa orellana: shrub or tree – achiote

=== Bombacaceae ===
==== Bernoullia ====
- Bernoullia flammea

==== Ceiba ====
- Ceiba acuminata: tree
- Ceiba aesculifolia: tree – pochote
- Ceiba pentandra: tree – higuera, salaton

==== Pseudobombax ====
- Pseudobombax ellipticum – clavellina
- Pseudobombax palmeri: tree

=== Boraginaceae ===
==== Bourreria ====
- Bourreria superba

==== Cordia ====
- Cordia alliodora: tree – botoncillo
- Cordia cordiformis: tree
- Cordia diversifolia: tree – sebo
- Cordia eleagnoides: tree – barcino
- Cordia inermis: tree
- Cordia morelosana: tree
- Cordia prunifolia: tree – frutilla
- Cordia salvadorensis: tree
- Cordia spinescens: tree – bejuco negro, bejuco prieto, cabeza de arriera

==== Ehretia ====
- Ehretia latifolia: tree

==== Heliotropium ====
- Heliotropium fallax: herb
- Heliotropium indicum: annual herb – borajilla, heliptrope
- Heliotropium procumbens: herb
- Heliotropium rufipilum: herb – jaboncillo

==== Macromeria ====
- Macromeria exserta: herb
- Macromeria longiflora: herb

==== Tournefortia ====
- Tournefortia acutiflora: herb
- Tournefortia hirsutissima: herb
- Tournefortia mutabilis: herb
- Tournefortia petiolaris: herb
- Tournefortia volubilis: herb
- Tournefortia petiolaris: herb
- Tournefortia petiolaris: herb

=== Buddlejaceae ===
==== Buddleja ====
- Buddleja cordata: shrub – butterfly bush, topozan, tepoza
- Buddleja parviflora: shrub – tepozan
- Buddleja sessiliflora: shrub – tepozan

=== Burseraceae ===
==== Bursera ====
- Bursera bipinata: tree
- Bursera bipinata × Bursera copalifera: tree
- Bursera copalifera: tree
- Bursera diversifolia: tree
- Bursera fagaroides: tree – copal, cuajiote
- Bursera grandifolia: tree – cuajiote colorado
- Bursera graveolens: tree – palo santo
- Bursera heteresthes: tree
- Bursera kerberi: tree
- Bursera multijuga: tree
- Bursera penicillata: tree
- Bursera rhoifolia: tree
- Bursera schlechtendalii: tree
- Bursera simaruba: tree – cuajiote blanco
- Bursera sp. nov.

==== Commiphora ====
- Commiphora sarcopoda: tree

==== Terebinthus ====
- Terebinthus acuminata: tree

=== Cactaceae ===
==== Acanthocereus ====
- Acanthocereus occidentalis: vine cactus

==== Cephalocereus ====
- Cephalocereus alensis: barrel cactus – Sonora

==== Epiphyllum ====
- Epiphyllum anguliger: vine cactus – pitayita

==== Ferocactus ====
- Ferocactus reppenhagenii: barrel cactus – biznaga

==== Heliocereus ====
- Heliocereus speciosus: vine cactus – pitayita

==== Hylocereus ====
- Hylocereus ocamponis: vine cactus – pitahaya
- Hylocereus purpusii: vine cactus

==== Mammillaria ====
- Mammillaria beneckei: barrel cactus
- Mammillaria reppenhagenii: barrel cactus – biznaguita
- Mammillaria scrippsiana: barrel cactus
- Mammillaria supraflumen: barrel cactus

==== Neobuxbaumia ====
- Neobuxbaumia mezcalensis

==== Nopalea ====
- Nopalea karwinskiana: nopal cactus – prickly pear, nopal de venadillo, tuna

==== Opuntia ====
- Opuntia atropes: nopal cactus
- Opuntia fuliginosa: nopal cactus – nopal, tuna
- Opuntia puberula: nopal cactus – nopal

==== Pachycereus ====
- Pachycereus pecten-aboriginum – cactus organo, pitayo cimmaron, huevo de sopilote

==== Peniocereus ====
- Peniocereus cuixmalensis: vine cactus

==== Pereskiopsis ====
- Pereskiopsis aquosa: cactus bush
- Pereskiopsis diguetii: cactus bush – patilona, patilon

==== Rhipsalis ====
- Rhipsalis baccifera: cactus herb

==== Selenicereus ====
- Selenicereus atropilosus: vine cactus
- Selenicereus vagans: vine cactus

==== Stenocereus ====
- Stenocereus queretaroensis – organo huevo de sopilote, petaya, pitayita

=== Callitrichaceae ===
==== Callitriche ====
- Callitriche heterophylla: aquatic herb

=== Campanulaceae or Lobeliaceae ===
==== Diastatea ====
- Diastatea micrantha

==== Heterotoma ====
- Heterotoma lobelioides var. glabra: annual herb

==== Lobelia ====
- Lobelia cordifolia: annual herb
- Lobelia fenestralis: annual herb
- Lobelia jaliscensis: annual herb – Jalisco
- Lobelia laxiflora: annual herb
- Lobelia longicaulis: annual herb
- Lobelia occidentalis: annual herb

=== Capparaceae ===
==== Capparis ====
- Capparis mollicella: shrub – caper, periquillo
- Capparis quiriguensis: shrub

==== Cleome ====
- Cleome pilosa: annual herb
- Cleome speciosa: annual herb – volantin
- Cleome tenuis: annual herb – iltis
- Cleome viscosa: annual herb

==== Crateva ====
- Crateva palmeri: tree – cascaron, granadilla

==== Morisonia ====
- Morisonia americana: tree – chico cimarron, rasca, chicozapote

=== Capparaceae or Resedaceae ===
==== Forchhammeria ====
- Forchhammeria pallida
- Forchhammeria sessifolia

=== Caprifoliaceae ===
==== Lonicera ====
- Lonicera acutifolia: shrub – honeysuckle

==== Symphoricarpos ====
- Symphoricarpos microphyllus: shrub

=== Caprifoliaceae or Adoxaceae ===
==== Viburnum ====
- Viburnum hartwegii: shrub
- Viburnum microcarpum: shrub

=== Caricaceae ===
==== Carica ====
- Carica papaya: tree – papaya

==== Jacaratia ====
- Jacaratia mexicana: tree – bonete

==== Jarilla ====
- Jarilla chocola: tree

=== Caryophyllaceae ===
==== Arenaria ====
- Arenaria lanuginosa: herb – sandwort
- Arenaria megalantha: herb – sandwort

==== Cerastium ====
- Cerastium nutans: herb – chickweed
- Cerastium sinaloense: herb – chickweed

==== Drymaria ====
- Drymaria cordata: herb
- Drymaria excisa: herb
- Drymaria gracilis: herb
- Drymaria minuscula: herb
- Drymaria villosa: herb

==== Stellaria ====
- Stellaria spp.: herbs – starwort, stitchwort; (formerly the now-obsolete genus Alsine)
  - Stellaria cuspidata: herb – chickweed

=== Celastraceae ===
==== Celastrus ====
- Celastrus pringlei: shrub – bejuco relumbroso, junquillo

==== Perrottetia ====
- Perrottetia longistylis: bush

==== Rhacoma ====
- Rhacoma eucymosa: tree
- Rhacoma managuatillo

==== Schaefferia ====
- Schaefferia frutescens: shrub
- Schaefferia pilosa: shrub

==== Wimmeria ====
- Wimmeria lanceolata: shrub – zarcillito

==== Zinowiewia ====
- Zinowiewia concinna: shrub – cloud forest – librillo

=== Chenopodiaceae ===
==== Chenopodium ====
- Chenopodium ambrosioides: annual herb – epazote
- Chenopodium graveolens: annual herb – epazote

=== Chloranthaceae ===
==== Hedyosmum ====
- Hedyosmum mexicanum: tree – cloud forest – guardalagua

=== Chrysobalanaceae ===
==== Couepia ====
- Couepia polyandra: shrub – zapotillo

==== Licania ====
- Licania retifolia: shrub

=== Clethraceae ===
==== Clethra ====
- Clethra fragans: bush (not in Vazquez)
- Clethra rosei: bush – canelo, roble
- Clethra vicentina: bush – cloud forest, pine-oak forest – cucharo
- Clethra sp.: bush

=== Cochlospermaceae or Bixaceae ===
==== Cochlospermum ====
- Cochlospermum vitifolium: tree – panicua

=== Combretaceae ===
==== Combretum ====
- Combretum fruticosum: vine or trepedora – peine de chango, peinecillo

=== Compositae or Asteraceae ===
==== Acmella ====
- Acmella alba: herb – toothache plant
- Acmella oppositifolia: herb – toothache plant

==== Ageratum ====
- Ageratum corymbosum: annual herb
- Ageratum corymbosum: annual herb
- Ageratum corymbosum fo. albiflorum: annual herb
- Ageratum houstonianum: annual herb

==== Alloispermum ====
- Alloispermum colimense: annual herb
- Alloispermum integrifolium: annual herb
- Alloispermum palmeri var. palmeri: annual herb
- Alloispermum scabrum var. scabrum: annual herb

==== Archibaccharis ====
- Archibaccharis asperifolia: shrub
- Archibaccharis hieracioides var. glandulosa: shrub
- Archibaccharis schiedeana: shrub
- Archibaccharis serratifolia: shrub

==== Aster or Symphyotrichum ====
- Aster moranensis: herb – hojasen
- Aster subulatus: herb

==== Baccharis ====
- Baccharis heterophylla: shrub – caracuata cimarrona
- Baccharis multiflora: shrub
- Baccharis occidentalis: shrub
- Baccharis pteronioides: shrub – escoba, jarilla, yerba de pasm
- Baccharis salicifolia: shrub – mule fat
- Baccharis trinervis: shrub – heirba de arlomo

==== Baltimora ====
- Baltimora geminata: herb

==== Bidens ====
- Bidens acrifolia: herb
- Bidens aequisquama var. aequisquama: herb
- Bidens odorata var. odorata: herb
- Bidens odorata var. rosea: herb
- Bidens ostruthioides: herb
- Bidens pilosa: herb – beggarticks, aceitilla
- Bidens reptans var. urbanii: herb
- Bidens riparia var. refracta: herb
- Bidens rostrata: herb
- Bidens squarrosa: herb
- Bidens triplinervia: herb

==== Brickellia ====
- Brickellia adenolepis: herb
- Brickellia cardiophylla: herb
- Brickellia diffusa: herb
- Brickellia filipes: herb
- Brickellia jaliscensis: herb
- Brickellia magnifica: shrub:
- Brickellia scoparia: herb or shrub
- Brickellia secundiflora var. monticola: herb or shrub
- Brickellia squarrosa: herb or shrub
- Brickellia subuligera: shrub

==== Calea ====
- Calea urticifolia var. urticifolia: shrub – amargocilla, regama, tacote amargoso

==== Carminatia ====
- Carminatia recondita: herb
- Carminatia tenuiflora: herb

==== Chaptalia ====
- Chaptalia leucocephala: herb

==== Chrysanthemum ====
- Chrysanthemum indicum var. mexicanum: herb

==== Cirsium ====
- Cirsium anartiolepis: perennial root herb – thistle, cardo santo
- Cirsium ehrenbergii: perennial root herb
- Cirsium mexicanum: perennial root herb
- Cirsium tolucanum: perennial root
- Cirsium sp. nov.: perennial root – cardo santo

==== Clibadium ====
- Clibadium arboreum: herb

==== Conyza ====
- Conyza apurensis: herb
- Conyza bonariensis: herb – alcanforcilla, arnica?
- Conyza canadensis: herb
- Conyza confusa: herb
- Conyza coronopifolia: herb
- Conyza coulteri: herb
- Conyza microcephala: herb
- Conyza sophiifolia: herb

==== Coreopsis ====
- Coreopsis petrophiloides: herb

==== Cosmos ====
- Cosmos bipinnatus: herb – amapola
- Cosmos carvifolius: herb
- Cosmos intercedens: herb
- Cosmos sulphureus: herb

==== Cymophora ====
- Cymophora hintonii: herb

==== Dahlia ====
- Dahlia coccinea: herb – charahuesca
- Dahlia tenuicaulis: perennial bulb herb – arbusto

==== Decachaeta ====
- Decachaeta haenkeana: bush

==== Delilia ====
- Delilia biflora: herb

==== Desmanthodium ====
- Desmanthodium fruticosum: shrub

==== Dyssodia ====
- Dyssodia neomexicana var. pulcherrima: herb
- Dyssodia porophyllum var. cancellata: shrub
- Dyssodia squamosa: shrub
- Dyssodia tagetiflora: shrub

==== Eclipta ====
- Eclipta prostrata: herb

==== Elephantopus ====
- Elephantopus mollis: herb

==== Erechtites ====
- Erechtites hieraciifolius: herb

==== Erigeron ====
- Erigeron longipes: herb
- Erigeron ortegae var. ortigae: herb
- Erigeron polycephalus: herb
- Erigeron velutipes: herb – botoncillo, seraja

==== Eupatorium ====
- Eupatorium araliifolium: shrub
- Eupatorium areolare: shrub
- Eupatorium arsenei: shrub
- Eupatorium atrocordatum: shrub
- Eupatorium ceriferum: shrub
- Eupatorium chiapense: shrub
- Eupatorium choricephalum: shrub
- Eupatorium ciliatum: shrub
- Eupatorium collinum: shrub – vara blanca
- Eupatorium conspicuum: shrub
- Eupatorium cronquistii: shrub
- Eupatorium cylindricum: shrub
- Eupatorium dolichobasis: shrub
- Eupatorium glaberrimum: shrub
- Eupatorium hebebotryum: shrub
- Eupatorium isolepis: shrub
- Eupatorium lasioneuron: shrub
- Eupatorium leptodictyon: shrub
- Eupatorium mairetianum: shrub
- Eupatorium malacolepis: shrub
- Eupatorium monanthum: shrub
- Eupatorium morifolium: shrub
- Eupatorium muelleri: shrub
- Eupatorium nelsonii: shrub
- Eupatorium odoratum: herb – tavardillo
- Eupatorium oerstedianum: shrub
- Eupatorium oresbium: shrub
- Eupatorium ovaliflorum: shrub
- Eupatorium pauperculum: shrub
- Eupatorium pazcuarense: shrub
- Eupatorium pichinchense: shrub
- Eupatorium polybotryum: shrub
- Eupatorium quadrangulare: shrub
- Eupatorium ramireziorum: shrub
- Eupatorium rhomboideum: shrub
- Eupatorium scabrellum: shrub
- Eupatorium sinaloense: shrub
- Eupatorium sonorae: shrub
- Eupatorium vitifolium: shrub

==== Eupatorium or Ageratina ====
- Eupatorium barriei: shrub
- Eupatorium manantlanum: shrub

==== Fleischmannia ====
- Fleischmannia arguta: herb – escobita

==== Florestina ====
- Florestina pedata: herb

==== Galeana ====
- Galeana pratensis: herb

==== Galinsoga ====
- Galinsoga quadriradiata: herb – tacote

==== Gnaphalium ====
- Gnaphalium americanum: herb
- Gnaphalium attenuatum var. attenuatum: herb
- Gnaphalium attenuatum var. sylvicola: herb
- Gnaphalium bourgovii: herb – gordolobo
- Gnaphalium canescens: herb
- Gnaphalium chartaceum: herb
- Gnaphalium jaliscense: herb
- Gnaphalium liebmannii var. monticola: herb
- Gnaphalium roseum: herb
- Gnaphalium semilanatum: herb
- Gnaphalium sphacelatum: herb
- Gnaphalium viscosum: herb
- Gnaphalium sp.: herb

==== Guardiola ====
- Guardiola mexicana
- Guardiola tulocarpus

==== Helenium ====
- Helenium scorzonerifolium

==== Heliopsis ====
- Heliopsis bupthalmoides
- Heliopsis procumbens

==== Heterosperma ====
- Heterosperma pinnatum

==== Heterotheca ====
- Hieracium abscissum
- Hieracium fendleri
- Hieracium fendleri subsp. ostreophyllum

==== Hofmeisteria ====
- Hofmeisteria dissecta
- Hofmeisteria urenifolia

==== Isocarpha ====
- Isocarpha oppositifolia

==== Jaegeria ====
- Jaegeria hirta
- Jaegeria macrocephala

==== Lagascea ====
- Lagascea decipiens
- Lagascea helianthifolia

==== Lasianthaea ====
- Lasianthaea ceanothifolia
- Lasianthaea fruticosa
- Lasianthaea fruticosa var. michoacana
- Lasianthaea helianthoides var. helianthoides
- Lasianthaea macrocephala
- Lasianthaea palmeri

==== Liabum ====
- Liabum broomeae or Sinclairia broomeae
- Liabum cervinum
- Liabum glabrum var. hypoleucum
- Liabum liebmannii
- Liabum sp. nov.

==== Melampodium ====
- Melampodium americanum
- Melampodium divaricatum
- Melampodium microcephalum
- Melampodium nutans
- Melampodium perfoliatum
- Melampodium tepicense

==== Mikania ====
- Mikania cordifolia

==== Milleria ====
- Milleria quinqueflora

==== Montanoa ====
- Montanoa andersonii
- Montanoa bipinnatifida
- Montanoa grandiflora
- Montanoa karvinskii
- Montanoa leucantha

==== Odontotrichum ====
- Odontotrichum multilobum
- Odontotrichum palmeri

==== Onoseris ====
- Onoseris onoseroides

==== Osbertia ====
- Osbertia stolonifera

==== Otopappus ====
- Otopappus acuminatus
- Otopappus epaleaceus
- Otopappus microcephalus
- Otopappus tequilanus
- Otopappus scaber

==== Parthenium ====
- Parthenium hysterophorus

==== Pectis ====
- Pectis linifolia
- Pectis repens

==== Perezia ====
- Perezia dugesii
- Perezia fruticosa
- Perezia glomeriflora
- Perezia hooveri
- Perezia patens
- Perezia simulata

==== Pericalia ====
- Pericalia sessilifolia

==== Perymenium ====
- Perymenium alticola
- Perymenium buphthalmoides
- Perymenium jaliscense
- Perymenium mendezii
- Perymenium uxoris
- Perymenium wilburorum

==== Pinaropappus ====
- Pinaropappus diguetii
- Pinaropappus roseus

==== Piqueria ====
- Piqueria triflora

==== Pittocaulon ====
- Pittocaulon hintonii

==== Pluchea ====
- Pluchea salicifolia
- Pluchea symphytifolia

==== Podachaenium ====
- Podachaenium eminens

==== Polymnia ====
- Polymnia maculata
- Polymnia macvaughii
- Polymnia uvedalia

==== Porophyllum ====
- Porophyllum coloratum
- Porophyllum lindenii
- Porophyllum pringlei
- Porophyllum punctatum
- Porophyllum ruderale
- Porophyllum viridiflorum

==== Psacalium ====
- Psacalium goldsmithii
- Psacalium peltigerum
- Psacalium pentaflorum
- Psacalium poculiferum

==== Pseudelephantopus ====
- Pseudelephantopus spicatus

==== Rumfordia ====
- Rumfordia floribunda
- Rumfordia floribunda var. floribunda
- Rumfordia floribunda var. jaliscensis

==== Schkuhria ====
- Schkuhria pinnata

==== Sclerocarpus ====
- Sclerocarpus divaricatus

==== Senecio ====
- Senecio albonervius
- Senecio angulifolius
- Senecio argutus
- Senecio barba-johannis
- Senecio bellidifolius
- Senecio callosus
- Senecio chapalensis
- Senecio cinerarioides
- Senecio galicianus var. galicianus
- Senecio galicianus var. manantlanensis
- Senecio hartwegii
- Senecio multidentatus
- Senecio roldana
- Senecio salignus
- Senecio sanguisorbae
- Senecio sinuatus
- Senecio standleyi
- Senecio stoechadiformis
- Senecio suffultus

==== Sigesbeckia ====
- Sigesbeckia agrestis

==== Simsia ====
- Simsia annectens

==== Sonchus ====
- Sonchus oleraceus – serata

==== Stevia ====
- Stevia alatipes
- Stevia caracasana
- Stevia lasioclada
- Stevia latifolia
- Stevia lucida
- Stevia micradenia
- Stevia monardifolia
- Stevia myricoides
- Stevia nelsonii
- Stevia origanoides
- Stevia ovata
- Stevia serrata var. serrata
- Stevia subpubescens
- Stevia trifida
- Stevia viscida

==== Tagetes ====
- Tagetes filifolia – anis
- Tagetes lucida – Santa Maria
- Tagetes lunulata
- Tagetes remotiflora – cempaxuchil, zampaxuchil
- Tagetes stenophylla
- Tagetes subulata

==== Taraxacum ====
- Taraxacum officinale – diente de leon

==== Tithonia ====
- Tithonia rotundifolia – tacote
- Tithonia tubiformis or Tithonia tubaeformis – acuate, tacote, huevo de tejon

==== Tridax ====
- Tridax accedens
- Tridax accedens
- Tridax procumbens

==== Trigonospermum ====
- Trigonospermum melampodioides – tacoti

==== Tagetes ====
- Trixis mexicana var. mexicana
- Trixis michuacana var. longifolia

==== Verbesina ====
- Verbesina cinerascens
- Verbesina crocata
- Verbesina culminicola
- Verbesina fastigiata
- Verbesina greenmanii
- Verbesina oligantha
- Verbesina oncophora
- Verbesina oxylepis
- Verbesina parviflora
- Verbesina sphaerocephala
- Verbesina tetraptera
- Verbesina turbacensis
- Verbesina heterocarpa

==== Vernonia ====
- Vernonia baadii
- Vernonia bealliae
- Vernonia capreifolia
- Vernonia cordata
- Vernonia coulteri
- Vernonia patens
- Vernonia pungens
- Vernonia serratuloides
- Vernonia triflosculosa
- Vernonia vernonioides

==== Tagetes ====
- Taraxacum officinale

==== Viguiera ====
- Viguiera cordata
- Viguiera cordata var. cordata
- Viguiera dentata
- Viguiera ensifolia
- Viguiera grahamii
- Viguiera hypochlora
- Viguiera latibracteata
- Viguiera pachycephala
- Viguiera pringlei
- Viguiera tenuis

==== Zinnia ====
- Zinnia americana
- Zinnia bicolor
- Zinnia peruviana
- Zinnia zinnioides

=== Connaraceae ===
==== Rourea ====
- Rourea glabra

=== Convolvulaceae ===
==== Evolvulus ====
- Evolvulus alsinoides
- Evolvulus nummularius

==== Ipomoea ====
- Ipomoea alba
- Ipomoea ampullacea
- Ipomoea arborescens
- Ipomoea batatoides
- Ipomoea bracteata
- Ipomoea capillacea
- Ipomoea cardiophylla
- Ipomoea cholulensis
- Ipomoea corymbosa
- Ipomoea cuernavacensis
- Ipomoea decemcornuta
- Ipomoea dimorphophylla
- Ipomoea dumosa
- Ipomoea funis
- Ipomoea hartwegii
- Ipomoea hederifolia
- Ipomoea invicta
- Ipomoea lindenii
- Ipomoea mairetii
- Ipomoea minutiflora
- Ipomoea murucoides
- Ipomoea neei
- Ipomoea nil – quebra plato
- Ipomoea noctulifolia
- Ipomoea orizabensis
- Ipomoea pseudoracemosa
- Ipomoea santillanii
- Ipomoea seducta
- Ipomoea spectata
- Ipomoea trifida
- Ipomoea sp. nov.

=== Coriariaceae ===
==== Coriaria ====
- Coriaria ruscifolia subsp. microphylla

=== Cornaceae ===
==== Cornus ====
- Cornus disciflora: cloud forest, pine-oak forest, gallery forest – azuhillo
- Cornus excelsa – cuatepinque

=== Crassulaceae ===
==== Bryophyllum ====
- Bryophyllum pinnatum – oja de amor

==== Graptopetalum ====
- Graptopetalum fruticosum

==== Curatella ====
- Sedum grandipetalum
- Sedum greggii
- Sedum jaliscanum
- Sedum tortuosum
- Sedum sp. 1
- Sedum sp. 2

=== Cruciferae or Brassicaceae ===
==== Brassica ====
- Brassica rapa – mostaza

==== Cardamine ====
- Cardamine fulcrata

==== Lepidium ====
- Lepidium lasiocarpum
- Lepidium oblongum
- Lepidium virginicum

==== Raphanus ====
- Raphanus raphanistrum – rapanillo

==== Rorippa ====
- Rorippa nasturtium-aquaticum – berro

=== Cucurbitaceae ===
==== Cayaponia ====
- Cayaponia attenuata – pedo de Judas
- Cayaponia racemosa – amole

==== Cremastopus ====
- Cremastopus rostratus

==== Cucumis ====
- Cucumis anguria – peppinillo

==== Cucurbita ====
- Cucurbita argyrosperma – calabaza de peljeho, calabaze de Castilla de pellejo
- Cucurbita ficifolia – si la coyote

==== Cyclanthera ====
- Cyclanthera dissecta
- Cyclanthera langaei
- Cyclanthera steyermarkii
- Cyclanthera tamnoides

==== Echinopepon ====
- Echinopepon jaliscanus
- Echinopepon lanatus
- Echinopepon pringlei
- Echinopepon racemosus

==== Ibervillea ====
- Ibervillea maxima – tololonche

==== Melothria ====
- Melothria pendula
- Melothria pringlei

==== Momordica ====
- Momordica charantia – estropajo

==== Polyclathra ====
- Polyclathra cucumerina

==== Rytidostylis ====
- Rytidostylis gracilis
- Rytidostylis longisepala

==== Schizocarpum ====
- Schizocarpum longisepalum
- Schizocarpum palmeri

==== Sechium ====
- Sechium compositum

==== Sicyos ====
- Sicyos laciniatus
- Sicyos longisepalus

=== Cuscutaceae ===
==== Cuscuta ====
- Cuscuta corymbosa – tirisia
- Cuscuta mitriformis or Cuscuta mitraeformis – tripa de pollo, tirisia

=== Dichapetalaceae ===
==== Tapura ====
- Tapura mexicana

=== Dilleniaceae ===
==== Curatella ====
- Curatella americana – rasca vieja

==== Davilla ====
- Davilla kunthii

=== Dipentodontaceae ===
==== Perrottetia ====
- Perrottetia longistylis: cloud forest

=== Ebenaceae ===
==== Diospyros ====
- Diospyros sinaloensis
- Diospyros sp.

=== Elaeocarpaceae ===
==== Muntingia ====
- Muntingia calabura – majagua

==== Sloanea ====
- Sloanea terniflora – aguatoso, ajuatoso

=== Ericaceae ===
==== Arbutus ====
- Arbutus occidentalis – madrono
- Arbutus xalapensis – madroño

==== Comarostaphylis ====
- Comarostaphylis discolor – madronillo, madrono
- Comarostaphylis discolor subsp. manantlanensis – madronillo
- Comarostaphylis glaucescens

==== Gaultheria ====
- Gaultheria hirtiflora

==== Vaccinium ====
- Vaccinium confertum
- Vaccinium stenophyllum – cloud forest, pine-oak forest, pine forest – capulincillo

=== Euphorbiaceae ===
==== Acalypha ====
- Acalypha alopecuroides
- Acalypha cincta
- Acalypha filipes
- Acalypha grisea
- Acalypha hypogaea
- Acalypha langiana
- Acalypha microphylla
- Acalypha ocymoides
- Acalypha ostryifolia
- Acalypha salvadorensis
- Acalypha schiedeana
- Acalypha setosa
- Acalypha subviscida
- Acalypha triloba
- Acalypha umbrosa
- Acalypha vagans
- Acalypha sp.

==== Adelia ====
- Adelia barbinervis

==== Argythamnia ====
- Argythamnia manzanilloana

==== Astrocasia ====
- Astrocasia tremula

==== Bernardia ====
- Bernardia gentryana
- Bernardia mexicana
- Bernardia santanae

==== Bernardia ====
- Chamaesyce berteroana or Chamaesyce berteriana
- Chamaesyce grisea
- Chamaesyce hirta
- Chamaesyce hirta var. procumbens
- Chamaesyce hypericifolia
- Chamaesyce hyssopifolia
- Chamaesyce indivisa

==== Chiropetalum ====
- Chiropetalum schiedeanum

==== Cnidoscolus ====
- Cnidoscolus autlanensis – chiquile
- Cnidoscolus spinosus
- Cnidoscolus tepiquensis

==== Croton ====
- Croton billbergianus
- Croton ciliato-glandulifera – dominguilla
- Croton draco – morado
- Croton flavescens
- Croton fragilis
- Croton fragilis
- Croton hirtus
- Croton pyramidalis
- Croton septemnervius
- Croton suberosus
- Croton wilburii
- Croton ynesiae

==== Dalechampia ====
- Dalechampia scandens

==== Dalembertia ====
- Dalembertia populifolia

==== Euphorbia ====
- Euphorbia ariensis
- Euphorbia calyculata
- Euphorbia colletioides
- Euphorbia cotinifolia
- Euphorbia cyathophora
- Euphorbia dentata
- Euphorbia dioscoreoides
- Euphorbia furcillata
- Euphorbia graminea
- Euphorbia graminea var. novogaliciana
- Euphorbia heterophylla
- Euphorbia humayensis
- Euphorbia jaliscensis
- Euphorbia macropus
- Euphorbia macvaughii
- Euphorbia multiseta
- Euphorbia ocymoides
- Euphorbia peganoides
- Euphorbia pulcherrima
- Euphorbia schlechtendalii var. pacifica
- Euphorbia sphaerorhiza
- Euphorbia strigosa
- Euphorbia tanquahuete
- Euphorbia xalapensis

==== Gymnanthes ====
- Gymnanthes actinostemoides

==== Hura ====
- Hura polyandra – habillo

==== Jatropha ====
- Jatropha bartlettii
- Jatropha cordata
- Jatropha mcvaughii
- Jatropha platyphylla

==== Mabea ====
- Mabea occidentalis

==== Manihot ====
- Manihot aesculifolia
- Manihot intermedia
- Manihot michaelis
- Manihot rhomboidea
- Manihot rhomboidea subsp. microcarpa

==== Margaritaria ====
- Margaritaria nobilis – agrio, varudo, jicama de cerro

==== Pedilanthus ====
- Pedilanthus calcaratus – candelilla
- Pedilanthus diazlunanus – candelilla
- Pedilanthus palmeri – candelilla

==== Phyllanthus ====
- Phyllanthus glaucescens
- Phyllanthus gypsicola
- Phyllanthus mocinianus
- Phyllanthus niruri
- Phyllanthus standleyi
- Phyllanthus stipulatus
- Phyllanthus tequilensis

==== Ricinus ====
- Ricinus communis – higuerilla

==== Sapium ====
- Sapium pedicellatum

==== Sebastiania ====
- Sebastiania corniculata
- Sebastiania hintonii

==== Tragia ====
- Tragia affinis
- Tragia pacifica
- Tragia volubilis

==== Sebastiania ====
- Sebastiania hintonii: cloud forest

=== Fagaceae ===
==== Quercus ====
- Quercus aristata
- Quercus calophylla (incorrectly called Quercus candicans): cloud forest
- Quercus castanea: pine-oak forest, pine forest
- Quercus crassifolia
- Quercus crassipes
- Quercus deserticola
- Quercus elliptica
- Quercus excelsa
- Quercus confertifolia (as Quercus gentryi)
- Quercus glaucescens
- Quercus insignis
- Quercus laeta
- Quercus laurina: pine-oak forest, pine forest, pine-fir forest – Encino laurelillo, Encino asta
- Quercus magnoliifolia: pine-oak forest, pine forest
- Quercus martinezii
- Quercus obtusata
- Quercus peduncularis
- Quercus planipocula
- Quercus prainiana, synonym of Quercus coffeicolor
- Quercus resinosa
- Quercus rugosa – quiebra hacha
- Quercus resinosa
- Quercus salicifolia: cloud forest
- Quercus scitophylla
- Quercus sororia
- Quercus splendens, synonym of Quercus peduncularis
- Quercus uxoris
- Quercus xalapensis
- Quercus sp. nov 1
- Quercus sp. nov 2
- Quercus sp. nov 3

=== Flacourtiaceae ===
==== Fouquieria ====
- Casearia arguta
- Casearia corymbosa
- Casearia sylvestris

==== Hasseltiopsis ====
- Hasseltiopsis dioica

==== Neopringlea ====
- Neopringlea viscosa

==== Prockia ====
- Prockia crucis

==== Xylosma ====
- Xylosma flexuosa
- Xylosma velutina

=== Fouquieriaceae ===
==== Fouquieria ====
- Fouquieria formosa

=== Garryaceae ===
==== Garrya ====
- Garrya laurifolia: cloud forest

=== Gentianaceae ===
==== Centaurium ====
- Centaurium martinii
- Centaurium nudicaule
- Centaurium setaceum
- Centaurium tenuifolium

==== Gentiana ====
- Gentiana caliculata
- Gentiana spathacea

==== Halenia ====
- Halenia brevicornis
- Halenia crumiana

=== Geraniaceae ===
==== Erodium ====
- Erodium cicutarium

==== Geranium ====
- Geranium hernandesii
- Geranium lilacinum
- Geranium seemannii
- Geranium sp.

=== Gesneriaceae ===
==== Achimenes ====
- Achimenes antirrhina
- Achimenes flava
- Achimenes grandiflora
- Achimenes heterophylla
- Achimenes longiflora

==== Drymonia ====
- Drymonia serrulata

==== Episcia ====
- Episcia punctata

==== Moussonia ====
- Moussonia elegans

==== Phinaea ====
- Phinaea multiflora

=== Guttiferae or Calophyllaceae ===
==== Calophyllum ====
- Calophyllum brasiliense: tree – arbol Maria

=== Guttiferae or Clusiaceae ===
==== Clusia ====
- Clusia salvini: cloud forest

=== Guttiferae or Hypericaceae ===
==== Clusia ====
- Hypericum paucifolium
- Hypericum philonotis

==== Rheedia ====
- Rheedia edulis

=== Hamamelidaceae ===
==== Matudaea ====
- Matudaea trinervia: cloud forest – cuencudo, naranjillo

=== Hernandiaceae ===
==== Gyrocarpus ====
- Gyrocarpus jatrophifolius – rabelero, volantines

=== Hippocrateaceae or Celastraceae ===
==== Hippocratea ====
- Hippocratea celastroides
- Hippocratea volubilis – hierba de cancer

=== Hydrophyllaceae ===
==== Hydrolea ====
- Hydrolea spinosa – borrajillo, espinocilla

==== Phacelia ====
- Phacelia platycarpa – berro, quelite de borrego

==== Wigandia ====
- Wigandia urens – mala mujer, quemadora

=== Icacinaceae ===
==== Calatola ====
- Calatola laevigata – aguacatillo

=== Juglandaceae ===
==== Juglans ====
- Juglans major: cloud forest – black walnut, nogal, nogal cimmarron

=== Julianaceae ===
==== Asterohyptis ====
- Amphipterygium adstringens – ciche de perra, cuachalalate

=== Labiatae or Lamiaceae ===
==== Asterohyptis ====
- Asterohyptis stellulata

==== Cunila ====
- Cunila longiflora
- Cunila lythrifolia
- Cunila pycnantha

==== Hyptis ====
- Hyptis albida
- Hyptis capitata
- Hyptis mutabilis
- Hyptis oblongifolia
- Hyptis pectinata
- Hyptis rhytidea
- Hyptis suaveolens
- Hyptis urticoides

==== Leonotis ====
- Leonotis nepetifolia – acuate

==== Lepechinia ====
- Lepechinia caulescens – salvia
- Lepechinia nelsonii

==== Leonotis ====
- Leonotis nepetifolia

==== Marrubium ====
- Marrubium vulgare – marrubio

==== Mentha ====
- Mentha sp.

==== Ocimum ====
- Ocimum micranthum – albacar

==== Salvia ====
- Salvia albocaerulea
- Salvia arthrocoma
- Salvia brachyodonta
- Salvia breviflora
- Salvia bruebenzii (not listed in Tropicos)
- Salvia carnea
- Salvia cinnabarina
- Salvia concolor
- Salvia cuevasiana or Scutellaria cuevasiana
- Salvia elegans – espinosilla
- Salvia firma
- Salvia gesneriflora
- Salvia hispanica
- Salvia iodantha
- Salvia lasiantha
- Salvia lasiocephala
- Salvia lavanduloides
- Salvia leucantha
- Salvia longispicata
- Salvia longistyla
- Salvia manantlanensis
- Salvia mcvaughii
- Salvia meera
- Salvia mexicana
- Salvia platyphylla
- Salvia polystachia
- Salvia purpurea
- Salvia ramamoorthyana
- Salvia riparia
- Salvia rostellata
- Salvia santanae
- Salvia sapinea
- Salvia sessei
- Salvia thyrsiflora
- Salvia uruapana
- Salvia vazquezii
- Salvia viscidifolia

==== Satureja ====
- Satureja jaliscana
- Satureja macrostema var. laevigata

==== Scutellaria ====
- Scutellaria caerulea
- Scutellaria purpurascens

==== Stachys ====
- Stachys agraria
- Stachys coccinea
- Stachys grahamii
- Stachys manantlanensis
- Stachys pacifica

=== Lauraceae ===
==== Aiouea ====
- Aiouea pachypoda: cloud forest – laurel

==== Beilschmiedia ====
- Beilschmiedia manantlanensis

==== Licaria ====
- Licaria triandra – ahuacatillo, cicuito, estrella

==== Litsea ====
- Litsea glaucescens – laurelillo

==== Nectandra ====
- Nectandra hihua – aguacatillo, laurel

==== Persea ====
- Persea hintonii – laurel
- Persea sp.

=== Leguminosae or Mimosaceae, Caesalpiniaceae, Fabaceae ===
==== Acacia ====
- Acacia acatlensis
- Acacia angustissima var. angustissima – timbre
- Acacia angustissima var. texensis
- Acacia cochliacantha – conchilla, espino, huizache
- Acacia farnesiana or Vachellia farnesiana: secondary vegetation – huisache
- Acacia glomerosa
- Acacia hindsii – huizcolote
- Acacia macilenta – chachacahuite, guaje
- Acacia pennatula – tepame
- Acacia riparia – tasajillo
- Acacia × standleyi
- Acacia tequilana

==== Aeschynomene ====
- Aeschynomene americana var. glandulosa
- Aeschynomene amorphoides
- Aeschynomene histrix var. histrix
- Aeschynomene langlassei
- Aeschynomene petraea
- Aeschynomene rudis
- Aeschynomene villosa var. mexicana
- Aeschynomene villosa var. villosa

==== Albizia ====
- Albizia occidentalis
- Albizia tomentosa – nacastillo, parotilla, pelo de angel

==== Apoplanesia ====
- Apoplanesia paniculata

==== Astragalus ====
- Astragalus ervoides var. maysillesii
- Astragalus guatemalensis var. brevidentatus

==== Bauhinia ====
- Bauhinia divaricata – flor de reina
- Bauhinia pauletia – periquillo
- Bauhinia ungulata

==== Brogniartia ====
- Brogniartia mortonii

==== Caesalpinia ====
- Caesalpinia cacalaco – cacalote
- Caesalpinia mexicana
- Caesalpinia pulcherrima – tabachin

==== Calliandra ====
- Calliandra anomala
- Calliandra bijuga
- Calliandra caeciliae
- Calliandra eriophylla
- Calliandra grandiflora
- Calliandra hirsuta
- Calliandra houstonii – cabellos de angel
- Calliandra laevis: gallery forest – guajillo, palo fierro
- Calliandra longipedicellata: secondary vegetation

==== Calopogonium ====
- Calopogonium caeruleum
- Calopogonium mucunoides

==== Canavalia ====
- Canavalia acuminata
- Canavalia hirsutissima
- Canavalia septentrionalis
- Canavalia villosa

==== Cercidium ====
- Centrosema plumieri
- Centrosema pubescens – frijolillo
- Centrosema sagittatum
- Centrosema virginianum

==== Cercidium or Parkinsonia ====
- Cercidium praecox or Parkinsonia praecox – palo verde

==== Chamaecrista ====
- Chamaecrista absus var. meionandra
- Chamaecrista glandulosa var. flavicoma
- Chamaecrista nictitans var. jaliscensis
- Chamaecrista nictitans var. pilosa
- Chamaecrista punctulata – golondrina cimarrona
- Chamaecrista rotundifolia var. rotundifolia
- Chamaecrista serpens var. wrightii

==== Clitoria ====
- Clitoria mexicana
- Clitoria polystachya

==== Cologania ====
- Cologania biloba
- Cologania broussonetii
- Cologania procumbens

==== Conzattia ====
- Conzattia multiflora

==== Coursetia ====
- Coursetia caribaea
- Coursetia glandulosa
- Coursetia mollis
- Coursetia pumila – garbancillo

==== Crotalaria ====
- Crotalaria acapulcensis
- Crotalaria bupleurifolia
- Crotalaria cajanifolia
- Crotalaria filifolia
- Crotalaria incana
- Crotalaria longirostrata – bicho, cascabelillo, quelite golpeador
- Crotalaria micans
- Crotalaria mollicula – capitana
- Crotalaria pumila
- Crotalaria quercetorum
- Crotalaria sagittalis

==== Dalea ====
- Dalea cliffortiana
- Dalea elata
- Dalea foliolosa
- Dalea leucostachya
- Dalea obreniformis
- Dalea pulchella
- Dalea roseiflora
- Dalea sericea
- Dalea versicolor

==== Desmodium ====
- Desmodium affine
- Desmodium ambiguum
- Desmodium angustifolium
- Desmodium aparines
- Desmodium barbatum
- Desmodium bellum
- Desmodium cinereum
- Desmodium cordistipulum
- Desmodium distortum
- Desmodium ghiesbreghtii
- Desmodium glabrum
- Desmodium guadalajaranum
- Desmodium hartwegianum
- Desmodium infractum
- Desmodium jaliscanum
- Desmodium macrostachyum
- Desmodium molliculum
- Desmodium nicaraguense
- Desmodium novogalicianum
- Desmodium occidentale
- Desmodium orbiculare var. rubricaule
- Desmodium plicatum
- Desmodium prehensile
- Desmodium procumbens
- Desmodium procumbens var. transversum
- Desmodium pseudoamplifolium
- Desmodium sericophyllum
- Desmodium skinneri
- Desmodium strobilaceum
- Desmodium sumichrastii
- Desmodium tortuosum
- Desmodium urarioides
- Desmodium volubile

==== Diphysa ====
- Diphysa floribunda
- Diphysa puberulenta
- Diphysa suberosa

==== Entada ====
- Entada patens
- Entada polystachya

==== Enterolobium ====
- Enterolobium cyclocarpum – parota, huanacaste

==== Eriosema ====
- Eriosema diffusum
- Eriosema longicalyx
- Eriosema multiflorum
- Eriosema pulchellum

==== Erythrina ====
- Erythrina breviflora
- Erythrina lanata subsp. occidentalis

==== Eysenhardtia ====
- Eysenhardtia platycarpa
- Eysenhardtia polystachya

==== Galactia ====
- Galactia incana
- Galactia sp.

==== Haematoxylum ====
- Haematoxylum brasiletto – palo brasil

==== Indigofera ====
- Indigofera densiflora
- Indigofera jaliscensis
- Indigofera palmeri
- Indigofera thibaudiana

==== Inga ====
- Inga eriocarpa – cuil, guaginiguil, juaniquil peludo
- Inga hintonii – jacanicuil cimarron
- Inga laurina – cuaniquil, guajillo, jinicuil
- Inga vera

==== Leucaena ====
- Leucaena esculenta – huajillo, guaje
- Leucaena macrophylla – guaje

==== Lonchocarpus ====
- Lonchocarpus hintonii
- Lonchocarpus lanceolatus
- Lonchocarpus salvadorensis

==== Lotus ====
- Lotus oroboides
- Lotus repens

==== Lupinus ====
- Lupinus elegans – cantues
- Lupinus exaltatus – cantues
- Lupinus madrensis – cantues
- Lupinus stipulatus

==== Lysiloma ====
- Lysiloma acapulcense – tepeguaje
- Lysiloma microphyllum – tepemezquite consteno
- Lysiloma tergeminum – pelo de angel

==== Lysiloma ====
- Lysiloma acapulcensis
- Lysiloma microphyllum

==== Machaerium ====
- Machaerium kegelii
- Machaerium salvadorense – garabatom, guamuchil del diabilillo

==== Macroptilium ====
- Macroptilium atropurpureum
- Macroptilium sp.

==== Marina ====
- Marina crenulata
- Marina diffusa var. diffusa
- Marina grammadenia
- Marina neglecta var. neglecta – escobilla
- Marina nutans
- Marina scopa

==== Mimosa ====
- Mimosa acantholoba
- Mimosa affinis
- Mimosa albida
- Mimosa benthamii
- Mimosa galeottii
- Mimosa guatemalensis
- Mimosa invisa
- Mimosa pigra var. berlandieri
- Mimosa pudica
- Mimosa rosei
- Mimosa sp.

==== Nissolia ====
- Nissolia fruticosa
- Nissolia laxior
- Nissolia leiogyne
- Nissolia microptera

==== Pachecoa ====
- Pachecoa prismatica

==== Pachyrhizus ====
- Pachyrhizus erosus var. erosus

==== Parkinsonia ====
- Parkinsonia aculeata

==== Phaseolus ====
- Phaseolus coccineus subsp. coccineus
- Phaseolus coccineus subsp. formosus
- Phaseolus leptostachyus
- Phaseolus lunatus var. lunatus
- Phaseolus leptostachyus var. silvester
- Phaseolus micranthus
- Phaseolus pauciflorus
- Phaseolus perplexus
- Phaseolus vulgaris
- Phaseolus sp. 1
- Phaseolus sp. 2

==== Piscidia ====
- Piscidia carthagenensis

==== Pachecoa ====
- Pachecoa prismatica

==== Pithecellobium ====
- Pithecellobium acatlense – palo fierro
- Pithecellobium dulce – guamuchil
- Pithecellobium lanceolatum – guamuchilillo, mochaquelite

==== Platymiscium ====
- Platymiscium lasiocarpum

==== Prosopis ====
- Prosopis laevigata – mesquite

==== Ramirezella ====
- Ramirezella crassa
- Ramirezella lozanii – cambara
- Ramirezella micrantha
- Ramirezella strobilophora

==== Rhynchosia ====
- Rhynchosia discolor
- Rhynchosia edulis
- Rhynchosia minima
- Rhynchosia precatoria – colorin, ojo de perico
- Rhynchosia tarphantha

==== Schrankia ====
- Schrankia distachya – sierilla

==== Senna ====
- Senna alata
- Senna atomaria – vainilla
- Senna centranthera
- Senna cobanensis
- Senna foetidissima var. grandiflora
- Senna fruticosa
- Senna hirsuta var. hirta
- Senna mexicana
- Senna mollissima
- Senna multifoliolata var. multifoliolata
- Senna obtusifolia
- Senna occidentalis – bichi
- Senna pallida
- Senna pendula var. advena
- Senna pilifera var. subglabra
- Senna quinquangulata var. quinquangulata
- Senna septemtrionalis
- Senna talpana
- Senna uniflora
- Senna villosa

==== Sphinctospermum ====
- Sphinctospermum constrictum

==== Stylosanthes ====
- Stylosanthes guianensis

==== Stylosanthes ====
- Stylosanthes guianensis

==== Tephrosia ====
- Tephrosia conzattii
- Tephrosia langlassei
- Tephrosia macrantha
- Tephrosia multifolia
- Tephrosia nicaraguensis
- Tephrosia sinapou
- Tephrosia submontana
- Tephrosia viridiflora

==== Teramnus ====
- Teramnus uncinatus

==== Trifolium ====
- Trifolium amabile – trébol

==== Vicia ====
- Vicia humilis
- Vicia pulchella subsp. mexicana

==== Vigna ====
- Vigna adenantha
- Vigna linearis

==== Willardia ====
- Willardia schiedeana

==== Zapoteca ====
- Zapoteca formosa subsp. formosa
- Zapoteca formosa subsp. rosei
- Zapoteca tetragona

==== Zornia ====
- Zornia reticulata
- Zornia thymifolia

=== Lentibulariaceae ===
==== Pinguicula ====
- Pinguicula crenatiloba
- Pinguicula oblongiloba
- Pinguicula parvifolia

=== Loasaceae ===
==== Gronovia ====
- Gronovia scandens – mala mujer, hiedra, ortiga

==== Klaprothia ====
- Klaprothia fasciculata – mala mujer

==== Mentzelia ====
- Mentzelia hispida

=== Loganiaceae ===
==== Spigelia ====
- Spigelia anthelmia

=== Loranthaceae ===
==== Cladocolea ====
- Cladocolea grahamii
- Cladocolea inconspicua
- Cladocolea inorna
- Cladocolea loniceroides
- Cladocolea sp.

==== Psittacanthus ====
- Psittacanthus calyculatus
- Psittacanthus palmeri
- Psittacanthus ramiflorus
- Psittacanthus schiedeanus

==== Struthanthus ====
- Struthanthus condensatus
- Struthanthus interruptus

=== Lythraceae ===
==== Cuphea ====
- Cuphea appendiculata var. appendiculata
- Cuphea calaminthifolia
- Cuphea ferrisiae
- Cuphea hookeriana
- Cuphea inflata
- Cuphea jorullensis
- Cuphea leptopoda
- Cuphea llavea – cigarillo, perritos, pulmonaria
- Cuphea lobophora
- Cuphea lobophora var. lobophora
- Cuphea michoacana
- Cuphea tolucana
- Cuphea utriculosa
- Cuphea watsonii

==== Heimia ====
- Heimia salicifolia

=== Magnoliaceae ===
==== Magnolia ====
- Magnolia iltisiana: cloud forest – cacao, laurel, magnolia

==== Talauma ====
- Talauma sp. – cacao, yolocochitl

=== Malpighiaceae ===
==== Bunchosia ====
- Bunchosia mcvaughii
- Bunchosia palmeri
- Bunchosia strigosa

==== Byrsonima ====
- Byrsonima crassifolia – nance, nanche

==== Echinopterys ====
- Echinopterys eglandulosa – hierba de la cucaracha

==== Galphimia ====
- Galphimia glauca
- Galphimia sp.

==== Gaudichaudia ====
- Gaudichaudia albida
- Gaudichaudia cycloptera
- Gaudichaudia cynanchoides
- Gaudichaudia mcvaughii
- Gaudichaudia subverticillata

==== Heteropterys ====
- Heteropterys brachiata
- Heteropterys laurifolia – bjuco quipalero, palo bejucoso, palo de verdura

==== Lasiocarpus ====
- Lasiocarpus ferrugineus

==== Malpighia ====
- Malpighia ovata
- Malpighia romeroana var. nayaritensis
- Malpighia wilburiorum

==== Mascagnia ====
- Mascagnia dipholiphylla
- Mascagnia sinemariensis

==== Tetrapterys ====
- Tetrapterys mexicana

=== Malvaceae ===
==== Abutilon ====
- Abutilon abutiloides – amantillo
- Abutilon barrancae
- Abutilon ellipticum
- Abutilon haenkeanum
- Abutilon reventum
- Abutilon trisulcatum – algondoncillo, mantilla
- Abutilon umbellatum

==== Allosidastrum ====
- Allosidastrum hilarianum
- Allosidastrum pyramidatum

==== Anoda ====
- Anoda acerifolia
- Anoda crenatiflora
- Anoda cristata – malva morada, violeta, violetilla
- Anoda maculata

==== Briquetia ====
- Briquetia spicata

==== Gaya ====
- Gaya minutiflora

==== Gossypium ====
- Gossypium aridum
- Gossypium hirsutum

==== Heliocarpus ====
- Heliocarpus terebinthaceus

==== Herissantia ====
- Herissantia crispa

==== Hibiscus ====
- Hibiscus phoeniceus
- Hibiscus uncinellus

==== Hochreutinera ====
- Hochreutinera amplexifolia

==== Kearnemalvastrum ====
- Kearnemalvastrum subtriflorum

==== Kosteletzkya ====
- Kosteletzkya tubiflora

==== Malachra ====
- Malachra fasciata

==== Malva ====
- Malva parviflora – malva
- Malva sylvestris

==== Malvastrum ====
- Malvastrum americanum – guinar
- Malvastrum coromandelianum

==== Malvaviscus ====
- Malvaviscus arboreus var. arboreus
- Malvaviscus penduliflorus

==== Neobrittonia ====
- Neobrittonia acerifolia – huevos de coyote

==== Pavonia ====
- Pavonia oxyphylla var. melanommata
- Pavonia pleuranthera

==== Periptera ====
- Periptera ctenotricha
- Periptera macrostelis
- Periptera punicea

==== Phymosia ====
- Phymosia rosea

==== Robinsonella ====
- Robinsonella speciosa

==== Sida ====
- Sida abutilifolia
- Sida acuta
- Sida aggregata
- Sida barclayi
- Sida ciliaris
- Sida collina
- Sida glabra
- Sida haenkeana
- Sida jamaicensis
- Sida linifolia
- Sida rhombifolia – babosilla, escobita, guinar, huinar
- Sida rzedowskii
- Sida salviifolia
- Sida spinosa
- Sida abutilifolia
- Sida abutilifolia

==== Wissadula ====
- Wissadula amplissima

=== Melastomaceae or Melastomataceae ===
==== Arthrostemma ====
- Arthrostemma alatum – yerbamora

==== Clidemia ====
- Clidemia matudae
- Clidemia submontana

==== Conostegia ====
- Conostegia volcanalis: cloud forest – pedorra
- Conostegia xalapensis – mora

==== Heterocentron ====
- Heterocentron mexicanum
- Heterocentron subtriplinervium
- Heterocentron subtriplinervium sp. nov.

==== Leandra ====
- Leandra cornoides
- Leandra subseriata

==== Miconia ====
- Miconia albicans – morita, pedorra
- Miconia glaberrima
- Miconia mcvaughii

==== Pterolepis ====
- Pterolepis pumila

==== Tibouchina ====
- Tibouchina scabriuscula
- Tibouchina sp. nov.

=== Meliaceae ===
==== Cedrela ====
- Cedrela odorata – cedro rojo
- Cedrela odorata sp. nov.

==== Guarea ====
- Guarea glabra

==== Swietenia ====
- Swietenia humilis – caoba, cobano

==== Trichilia ====
- Trichilia americana – periquillo
- Trichilia havanensis
- Trichilia trifoliata

=== Menispermaceae ===
==== Cebatha ====
- Cebatha diversifolia

==== Cissampelos ====
- Cissampelos pareira – colorín, ohode perico, orozul

==== Disciphania ====
- Disciphania mexicana

=== Monimiaceae or Siparunaceae ===
==== Siparuna ====
- Siparuna andina – limoncillo, azagar, chumbejo

=== Menispermaceae ===
==== Monotropa ====
- Monotropa hypopitys – pipa de indio, Indian pipes

=== Mimosoideae ===
==== Inga ====
- Inga vera subsp. eriocarpa: cloud forest – cuaniquil

=== Moraceae ===
==== Brosimum ====
- Brosimum alicastrum – mojo, capomo, mojote

==== Chlorophora ====
- Chlorophora tinctora

==== Dorstenia ====
- Dorstenia drakena – gallito, barbudilla

==== Ficus ====
- Ficus cookii
- Ficus cotinifolia – amate negro, tescalama
- Ficus Ficus goldmanii – tescalama, zalate, zalaton
- Ficus insipida – higuera, amate, higuera blanca
- Ficus insipida var. insipida – camchin, higuera
- Ficus isophlebia
- Ficus lapathifolia – amate de hoja ancha
- Ficus maxima – higueron peluda
- Ficus microchlamys – higuera
- Ficus obtusifolia – higuerón
- Ficus pertusa – amatillo, camichin
- Ficus petiolaris
- Ficus pringlei
- Ficus tuerckheimii
- Ficus petiolaris – camichin
- Ficus sp. 1
- Ficus sp. 2
- Ficus sp. 3

==== Trophis ====
- Trophis noraminervae: gallery forest
- Trophis racemosa – ramoncillo

=== Moraceae or Urticaceae ===
==== Cecropia ====
- Cecropia obtusifolia – guarumbo, huarumbo, huitapil

==== Coussapoa ====
- Coussapoa purpusii – tescalamilla

=== Myricaceae ===
==== Morella ====
- Morella cerifera – wax myrtle, falso encino

=== Myrsinaceae ===
==== Ardisia ====
- Ardisia compressa – capulin, capulincillo, cordoban
- Ardisia mexicana
- Ardisia revoluta – arrayán, cordoban, timbuche agrio

==== Gentlea ====
- Gentlea mcvaughii

==== Parathesis ====
- Parathesis Ferruginea
- Parathesis villosa – mananita, timbuche cimarron

==== Rapanea ====
- Rapanea juergensenii – naranjillo;
- Rapanea myricoides

==== Synardisia ====
- Synardisia venosa

=== Myrtaceae ===
==== Calyptranthes ====
- Calyptranthes pallens var. mexicana – murta

==== Eugenia ====
- Eugenia capuli – capulín de mayo
- Eugenia crenularis
- Eugenia culminicola
- Eugenia petens
- Eugenia rekoi

==== Myrcianthes ====
- Myrcianthes fragrans var. fragrans – lentisco

==== Psidium ====
- Psidium guajaba – guayaba
- Psidium guineense – guayaba cimarrón, guavea del cerro, guayabilla, guaybilla vendera
- Psidium sartorianum – arrayán

=== Nyctaginaceae ===
==== Boerhavia ====
- Boerhavia coccinea – abrojo rojo

==== Mirabilis ====
- Mirabilis jalapa – aretito, maravilla
- Mirabilis nyctaginea

==== Pisonia ====
- Pisonia aculeata var. aculeata – coma de uña, garabato, garabato prieto
- Pisonia arborescens

==== Pisoniella ====
- Pisoniella arborescens

==== Salpianthus ====
- Salpianthus purpurascens

=== Ochnaceae ===
==== Ouratea ====
- Ouratea mexicana

=== Olacaceae ===
==== Ximenia ====
- Ximenia americana – ciruelillo

=== Oleaceae ===
==== Forestiera ====
- Forestiera reticulata
- Forestiera rhamnifolia

==== Fraxinus ====
- Fraxinus uhdei: cloud forest

==== Osmanthus ====
- Osmanthus americanus

=== Onagraceae ===
==== Epilobium ====
- Epilobium bonplandianum

==== Fuchsia ====
- Fuchsia arborescens: cloud forest
- Fuchsia cylindracea
- Fuchsia decidua
- Fuchsia fulgens – aretillo, chichile
- Fuchsia microphylla subsp. microphylla – coralillo, aretillo
- Fuchsia obconica
- Fuchsia thymifolia subsp. thymifolia

==== Gaura ====
- Gaura hexandra

==== Lopezia ====
- Lopezia miniata subsp. miniata
- Lopezia racemosa subsp. racemosa – alfilerillo
- Lopezia riesenbachia
- Lopezia semeiandra

==== Ludwigia ====
- Ludwigia decurrens
- Ludwigia octovalvis – calavera

==== Oenothera ====
- Oenothera kunthiana
- Oenothera pubescens – linda tarde
- Oenothera purpusii
- Oenothera rosea – hierba del golpe, linda artardecer

=== Opiliaceae ===
==== Agonandra ====
- Agonandra racemosa

=== Oxalidaceae ===
==== Oxalis ====
- Oxalis alpina
- Oxalis corniculata
- Oxalis galeottii
- Oxalis hernandesii
- Oxalis jacquiniana – cañitas
- Oxalis macrocarpa

=== Paperveraceae ===
==== Argemone ====
- Argemone ochroleuca – cardo santo, aceitilla, arnica blanca del campo, chicalote

==== Bocconia ====
- Bocconia arborea – arbol de Juda, llora sangre
- Bocconia frutescens – barbasco

=== Paperveraceae ===
==== Passiflora ====
- Passiflora biflora
- Passiflora exsudans
- Passiflora filipes
- Passiflora foetida – maracuyá silvestre
- Passiflora holosericea
- Passiflora jorullensis
- Passiflora pavonis
- Passiflora podadenia
- Passiflora porphyretica var. angustifolia
- Passiflora suberosa
- Passiflora sp. nov. 1
- Passiflora sp. nov. 2
- Passiflora sp.

=== Pedaliaceae or Martyniaceae ===
==== Martynia ====
- Martynia annua – gatitos, toritos

==== Proboscidea ====
- Proboscidea fragrans – hierba del toro

=== Phytolaccaceae ===
==== Ledenbergia ====
Ledenbergia macrantha

==== Petiveria ====
Petiveria alliacea – hierba del zorrillo, zorillo, caricillo silvestre

==== Phytolacca ====
Phytolacca icosandra – jaboncillo, conguerin, quilite Phytolacca rugosa – higuerilla

==== Rivina ====
Rivina humilis – bajatripa

==== Ledenbergia ====
Trichostigma octandrum – bejuco negro

=== Piperaceae ===
==== Peperomia ====
- Peperomia angularis
- Peperomia asarifolia
- Peperomia campylotropa
- Peperomia angularis – pimienta de tierra
- Peperomia cyclophylla
- Peperomia galioides
- Peperomia glabella
- Peperomia hispidula
- Peperomia hoffmannii
- Peperomia macrostachya
- Peperomia martiana
- Peperomia mexicana
- Peperomia molithrix
- Peperomia olivacea
- Peperomia peltata
- Peperomia quadrifolia
- Peperomia schizandra
- Peperomia tetraphylla
- Peperomia sp. 1
- Peperomia sp. 2
- Peperomia sp. 3
- Peperomia sp. 4
- Peperomia sp. 5
- Peperomia sp. 6

==== Piper ====
- Piper abalienatum
- Piper amalago – cordoncillo hoja
- Piper brevipedicellatum – hierba del arlomo, hoja santa
- Piper jaliscanum
- Piper michelianum – hierba de arlomo
- Piper novogalicianum
- Piper pseudolindenii
- Piper pseudofuligineum
- Piper rosei – hierba del arlomo, hoja santa
- Piper sanctum – acoyo, sacamantilla
- Piper stipulaceum
- Piper tuberculatum
- Piper umbellatum – acuya, hoja santa, sacamantilla
- Piper villiramulum – belencillo, cigarillo, cordoncillo
- Piper sp.

=== Plantaginaceae ===
==== Plantago ====
Plantago hirtella – lanten

=== Plumbaginaceae ===
==== Plumbago ====
- Plumbago scandens – flor de pegajoso, hierba del cancer, pegajoso

=== Podostemaceae ===
==== Podostemon ====
- Podostemon ceratophyllum

=== Primulaceae ===
==== Parathesis ====
- Parathesis villosa: cloud forest

=== Rhamnaceae ===
==== Rhamnus ====
- Rhamnus hintonii: cloud forest

=== Rosaceae ===
==== Alchemilla ====
- Alchemilla aphanoides

==== Crataegus ====
- Crataegus mexicana or Crataegus pubescens – Mexican hawthorn, tejocote, manzanita, tejocotera

==== Photinia ====
- Photinia parviflora: gallery forest

==== Prunus ====
- Prunus cortapico: cloud forest, pine–oak forest
- Prunus serotina – black cherry

==== Rubus ====
- Rubus adenotrichos: secondary vegetation

=== Rubiaceae ===
==== Balmea ====
- Balmea stormiae: gallery forest

==== Chiococca ====
- Chiococca pachyphylla: gallery forest

==== Rondeletia ====
- Rondeletia manantlanensis: cloud forest

=== Sabiaceae ===
==== Meliosma ====
- Meliosma dentata: cloud forest

=== Salicaceae ===
==== Populus ====
- Populus guzmanantlensis

==== Salix ====
- Salix bonplandiana
- Salix microphylla: gallery forest
- Salix paradoxa

==== Xylosma ====
- Xylosma flexuosa: cloud forest

=== Santalaceae or Viscaceae ===
==== Arceuthobium ====
- Arceuthobium globosum: vine

==== Phoradendron ====
- Phoradendron amplifolium: parasitic epiphyte – mistletoe
- Phoradendron brachystachyum: parasitic epiphyte – mistletoe
- Phoradendron carneum: parasitic epiphyte – mistletoe
- Phoradendron commutatum: parasitic epiphyte – mistletoe
- Phoradendron falcatum: parasitic epiphyte – mistletoe
- Phoradendron longifolium: parasitic epiphyte – mistletoe
- Phoradendron olivae: parasitic epiphyte – mistletoe
- Phoradendron quadrangulare: parasitic epiphyte – mistletoe
- Phoradendron olivae: parasitic epiphyte – mistletoe
- Phoradendron reichenbachianum: parasitic epiphyte – mistletoe
- Phoradendron robinsonii: parasitic epiphyte – mistletoe
- Phoradendron scaberrimum: parasitic epiphyte – mistletoe
- Phoradendron tetrapterum: parasitic epiphyte – mistletoe
- Phoradendron velutinum: parasitic epiphyte – mistletoe
- Phoradendron vernicosum: parasitic epiphyte – mistletoe

=== Sapindaceae and Aceraceae ===
==== Acer ====
- Acer binzayedii – some authorities consider this a disjunct population of Acer skutchii or a disjunct relict population of sugar maple (Acer saccharum), a much more northern species

=== Solanaceae ===
==== Solanum ====
- Solanum aligerum

=== Styracaceae ===
==== Styrax ====
- Styrax argenteus: cloud forest
- Styrax ramirezii

=== Symplocaceae ===
==== Symplocos ====
- Symplocos citraea

=== Theaceae or Pentaphylacaceae ===
==== Cleyera ====
- Cleyera integrifolia: cloud forest, gallery forest

==== Symplococarpon ====
- Symplococarpon purpusii: cloud forest

==== Ternstroemia ====
- Ternstroemia lineata – chico curioso

=== Tiliaceae or Malvaceae ===
==== Tilia ====
- Tilia mexicana or Tilia americana var. mexicana: cloud forest – sirimo

==== Triumfetta ====
- Triumfetta barbosa: cloud forest

=== Ulmaceae or Cannabaceae ===
==== Aphanante ====
- Aphanante monoica

=== Urticaceae ===
==== Cecropia ====
- Cecropia obtusifolia

=== Verbenaceae ===
==== Citharexylum ====
- Citharexylum mocinoi: cloud forest

==== Lippia ====
- Lippia umbellata: cloud forest

==== Verbena ====
- Verbena carolina

=== Violaceae ===
==== Hybanthus ====
- Hybanthus attenuatus: herb
- Hybanthus elatus: herb
- Hybanthus mexicanus: herb

==== Viola ====
- Viola grahamii: herb
- Viola oxyodontis: herb

=== Vitaceae ===
==== Ampelocissus ====
- Ampelocissus acapulcensis: vine

==== Ampelopsis ====
- Ampelopsis mexicana: vine

==== Cissus ====
- Cissus cucurbitina: vine
- Cissus rhombifolia: vine – bejuco de agua, parilla, uva
- Cissus verticillata: vine – parilla

==== Parthenocissus ====
- Parthenocissus quinquefolia: vine – Virginia creeper

==== Vitis ====
- Vitis tiliifolia: vine – uva

=== Zygophyllaceae ===
==== Guaiacum ====
- Guaiacum coulteri: tree – lignum vitae, palo fierro

==== Kallstroemia ====
- Kallstroemia maxima: shrub
- Kallstroemia rosei: shrub

==== Tribulus ====
- Tribulus cistoides: shrub

== See also ==
- List of birds of the Sierra de Manantlán Biosphere Reserve
- Reptiles of the Sierra de Manantlán Biosphere Reserve
