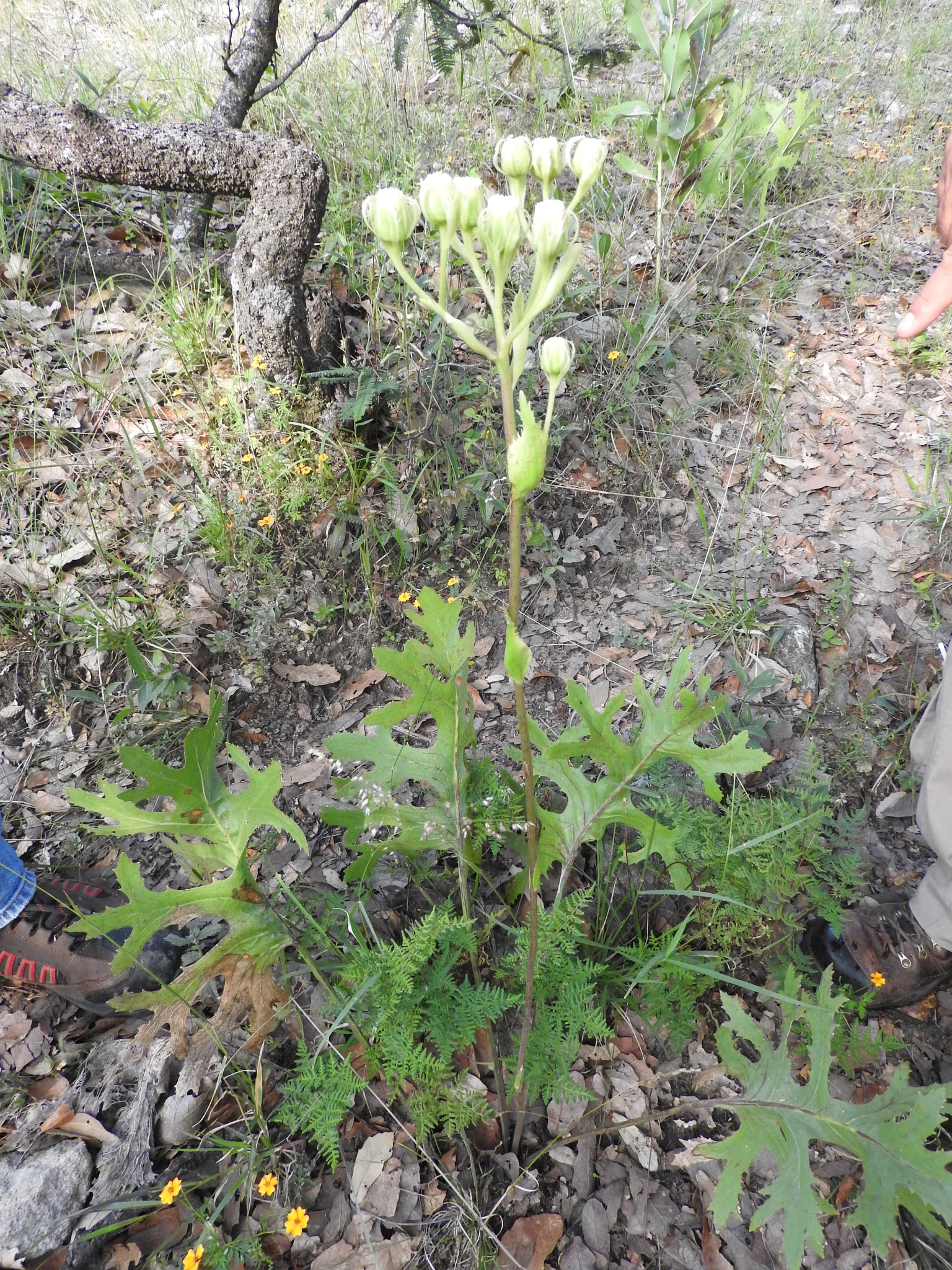
- Psacalium sinuatum

Scientific classification
- Kingdom: Plantae
- Clade: Embryophytes
- Clade: Tracheophytes
- Clade: Angiosperms
- Clade: Eudicots
- Clade: Asterids
- Order: Asterales
- Family: Asteraceae
- Subfamily: Asteroideae
- Tribe: Senecioneae
- Genus: Psacalium; Cass.

Synonyms
- Odontotrichum Zucc.; Pascalium Cass., spelling variant

= Psacalium =

Genus of flowering plants

Psacalium is a genus of flowering plants in the sunflower family. Indianbush is a common name for Psacalium.

Species

- Psacalium amplifolium (DC.) H.Rob. & Brettell
- Psacalium amplum (Rydb.) H.Rob. & Brettell
- Psacalium beamanii H.Rob.
- Psacalium brachycomum (S.F.Blake) H.Rob. & Brettell
- Psacalium calvum (Brandegee) Pippen
- Psacalium cervinum (Rydb.) H.Rob. & Brettell
- Psacalium cirsiifolium (Zucc.) H.Rob. & Brettell
- Psacalium cronquistiorum B.L.Turner
- Psacalium decompositum (A.Gray) H.Rob. & Brettell
- Psacalium eriocarpum (S.F.Blake) S.F.Blake
- Psacalium filicifolium (Rydb.) H.Rob. & Brettell
- Psacalium glabratum (Kunth) DC.
- Psacalium globosum (B.L.Rob. & Fernald) H.Rob. & Brettell
- Psacalium goldsmithii (B.L.Rob.) H.Rob. & Brettell
- Psacalium guatemalense (Standl. & Steyerm.) Cuatrec.
- Psacalium guerreroanum B.L.Turner
- Psacalium hintonii (Pippen) H.Rob. & Brettell
- Psacalium hintoniorum B.L.Turner
- Psacalium holwayanum (B.L.Rob.) Rydb.
- Psacalium laxiflorum Benth.
- Psacalium matudae H.Rob. & Brettell
- Psacalium megaphyllum (B.L.Rob. & Greenm.) Rydb.
- Psacalium mollifolium S.F.Blake
- Psacalium multilobum (Pippen) H.Rob. & Brettell
- Psacalium nanum Pippen
- Psacalium napellifolium (S.Schauer) H.Rob. & Brettell
- Psacalium nelsonii Rydb.
- Psacalium nephrophyllum (Rydb.) H.Rob. & Brettell
- Psacalium obtusilobum (B.L.Rob. & Greenm.) Rydb.
- Psacalium pachyphyllum (Sch.Bip. ex Sch.Bip.) H.Rob. & Brettell
- Psacalium palmeri (Greene) H.Rob. & Brettell
- Psacalium paucicapitatum (B.L.Rob. & Greenm.) H.Rob. & Brettell
- Psacalium peltatum (Kunth) Cass.
- Psacalium peltigerum (B.L.Rob. & Seaton) Rydb.
- Psacalium pentaflorum B.L.Turner
- Psacalium perezii B.L.Turner
- Psacalium pinetorum (Standl. & Steyerm.) Cuatrec.
- Psacalium platylepis (B.L.Rob. & Seaton) H.Rob. & Brettell
- Psacalium poculiferum (S.Watson) Rydb.
- Psacalium pringlei (S.Watson) H.Rob. & Brettell
- Psacalium radulifolium (Kunth) H.Rob. & Brettell
- Psacalium schillingii Panero & Villaseñor
- Psacalium sharpii B.L.Turner
- Psacalium silphiifolium (B.L.Rob. & Greenm.) H.Rob. & Brettell
- Psacalium sinuatum (Cerv.) H.Rob. & Brettell
- Psacalium tabulare Rydb.
- Psacalium tussilaginoides (Kunth) H.Rob. & Brettell
