= Brickellia diffusa =

Scientific classification
- Kingdom: Plantae
- Clade: Tracheophytes
- Clade: Angiosperms
- Clade: Eudicots
- Clade: Asterids
- Order: Asterales
- Family: Asteraceae
- Genus: Brickellia
- Species: B. diffusa

Binomial name
- Brickellia diffusa (Vahl) A.Gray

Synonyms
- Eupatorium diffusum Vahl; Bulbostylis diffusa (Vahl) DC.; Chondrilla rhombifolia (Willd.) Poiret; Coleosanthus diffusus (Vahl) Kuntze; Eupatorium aromaticum Sieber ex Sieber ex Steudel 1840 not L. 1753; Eupatorium capillare Desv.; Eupatorium trichosanthum A.Rich.; Prenanthes rhombifolia Humb. ex Willd.

Species of flowering plant

Brickellia diffusa is a Latin American species of flowering plants in the family Asteraceae. It is widespread across much of South America, Central America, Mexico, Galápagos, and the West Indies (Cuba, Trinidad, Hispaniola, etc.). Its distribution stretches from Sonora and Tamaulipas in northern Mexico to Jujuy in northern Argentina.
