= Sebastiania hintonii =

Conservation status
- Vulnerable (IUCN 3.1)

Scientific classification
- Kingdom: Plantae
- Clade: Tracheophytes
- Clade: Angiosperms
- Clade: Eudicots
- Clade: Rosids
- Order: Malpighiales
- Family: Euphorbiaceae
- Genus: Sebastiania
- Species: S. hintonii

Binomial name
- Sebastiania hintonii Lundell

Species of flowering plant

Sebastiania hintonii is a species of flowering plant in the family Euphorbiaceae. It was described in 1960. It is native to central and southwestern Mexico.
