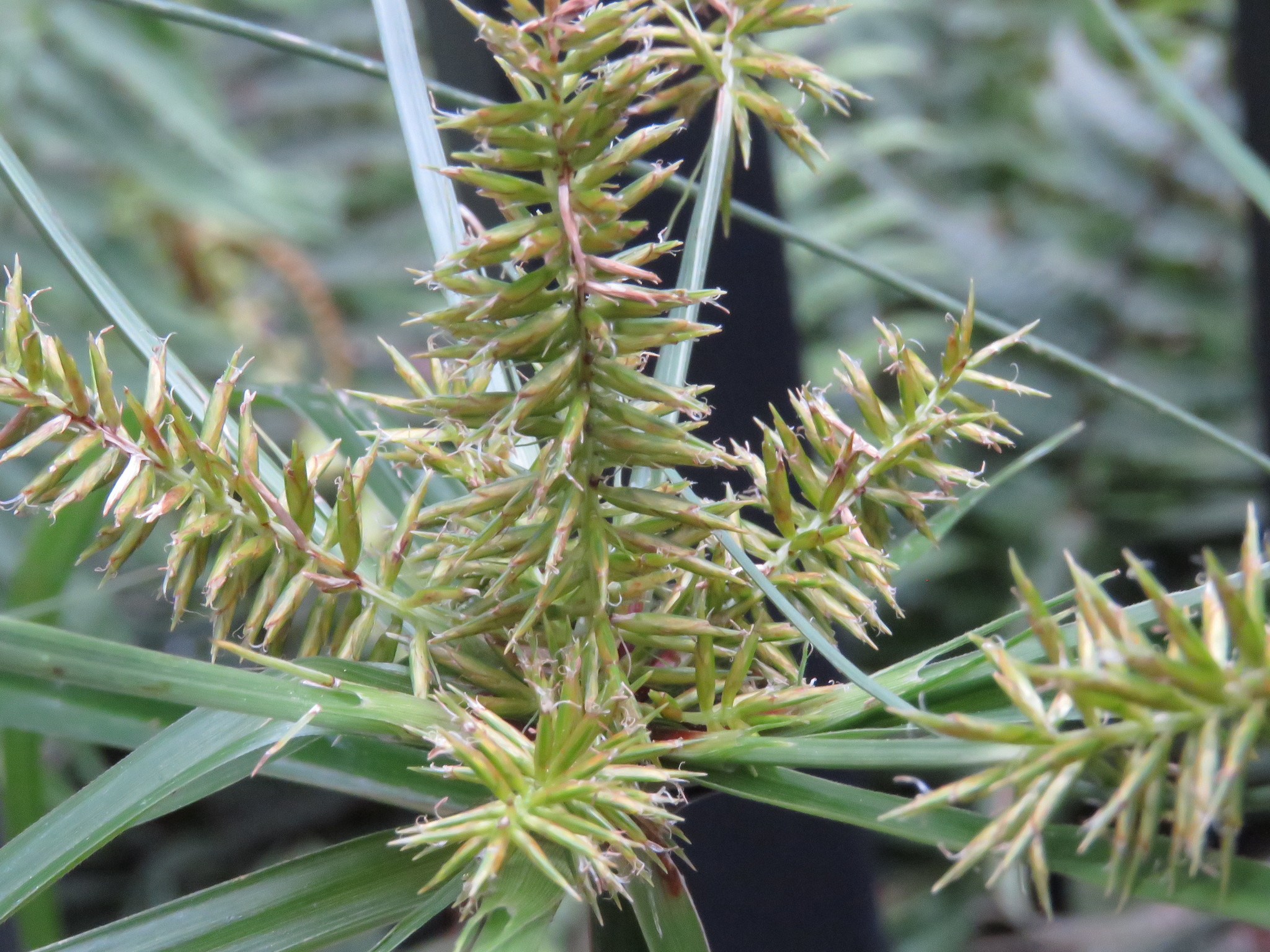

Scientific classification
- Kingdom: Plantae
- Clade: Tracheophytes
- Clade: Angiosperms
- Clade: Monocots
- Clade: Commelinids
- Order: Poales
- Family: Cyperaceae
- Genus: Cyperus
- Species: C. hermaphroditus

Binomial name
- Cyperus hermaphroditus (Jacq.) Standl., 1916

Synonyms
- Cyperus ferax var. hayesii (C.B.Clarke) Kük.; Torulinium hayesii C.B.Clarke

= Cyperus hermaphroditus =

Species of sedge

Cyperus hermaphroditus, commonly known as the hermaphrodite flatsedge, is a species of sedge that is native to parts of southern parts of North America, Central America and northern parts of South America.

== See also ==
- List of Cyperus species
