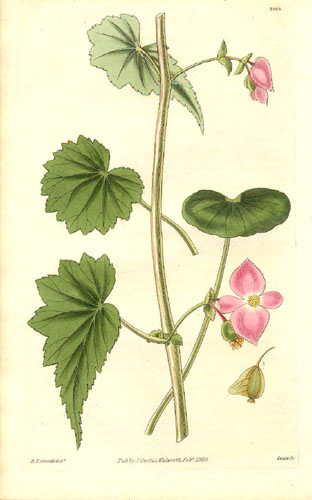

Scientific classification
- Kingdom: Plantae
- Clade: Tracheophytes
- Clade: Angiosperms
- Clade: Eudicots
- Clade: Rosids
- Order: Cucurbitales
- Family: Begoniaceae
- Genus: Begonia
- Species: B. gracilis

Binomial name
- Begonia gracilis Kunth

Synonyms
- Begonia diversifolia Graham; Begonia gracilis var. annulata A.DC.; Begonia gracilis var. depauperata A.DC.; Begonia gracilis var. diversifolia (Graham) A.DC.; Begonia gracilis var. martiana (Link & Otto) A.DC.; Begonia gracilis var. membranacea A.DC.; Begonia gracilis var. nervipilosa A.DC.; Begonia diversifolia Graham 1829; Begonia diversifiolia Knowles & Westc. 1837, illegitimate; Begonia heterophylla Klotzsch illegitimate; Begonia martiana Link & Otto; Begonia martiana var. gracilis (HBK) Carrière; Begonia tuberosa Sessé & Moç illegitimate; Knesebeckia martiana (Link & Otto) Klotzsch

= Begonia gracilis =

Species of flowering plant

Begonia gracilis is a species of flowering plant in the family Begoniaceae. It is a small herb widespread in the mountains of Mexico, from Chihuahua to Chiapas, often growing in protected locations in shaded areas.

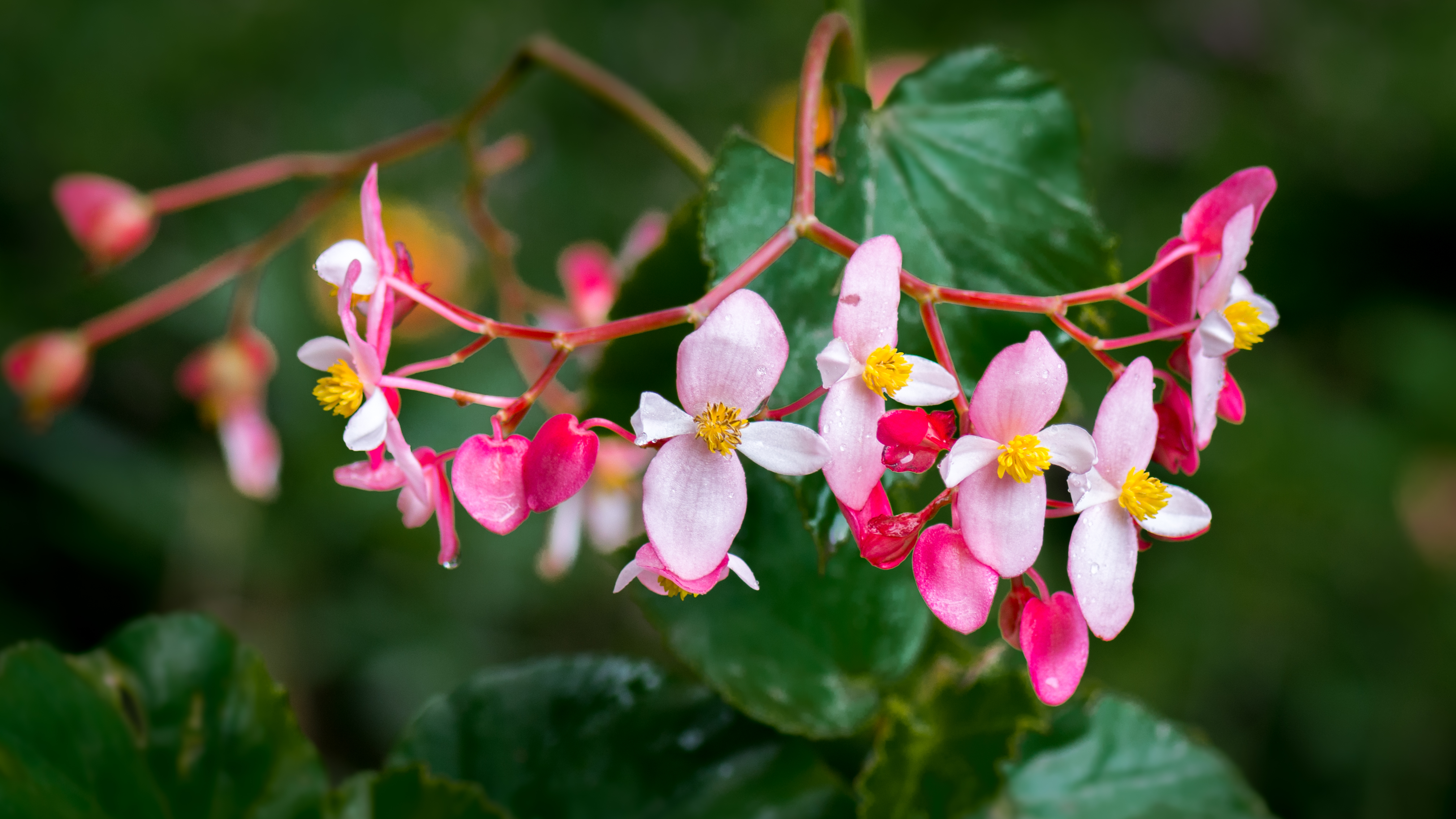
