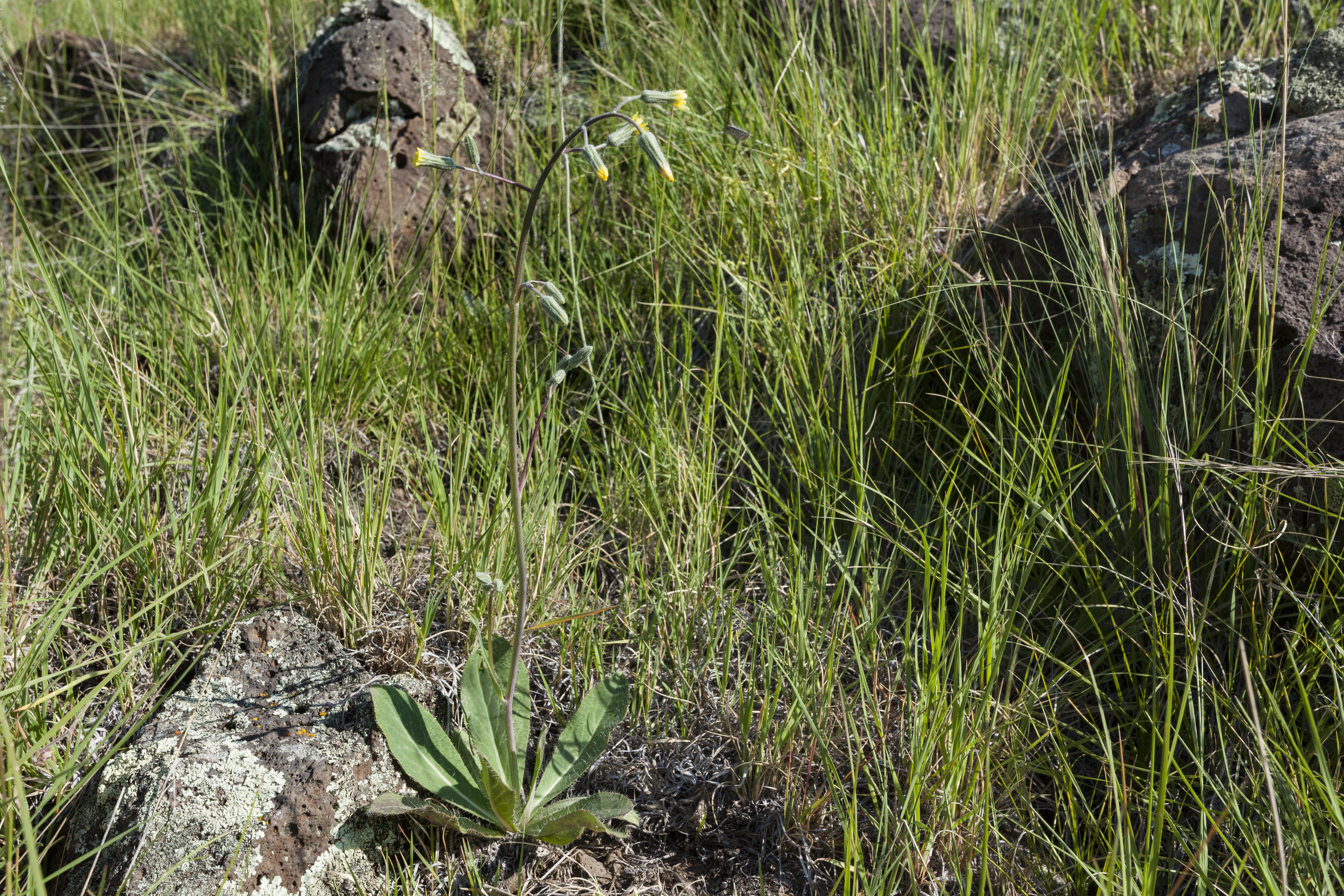

Conservation status
- Secure (NatureServe)

Scientific classification
- Kingdom: Plantae
- Clade: Embryophytes
- Clade: Tracheophytes
- Clade: Angiosperms
- Clade: Eudicots
- Clade: Asterids
- Order: Asterales
- Family: Asteraceae
- Genus: Hieracium
- Species: H. fendleri

Binomial name
- Hieracium fendleri Sch.Bip. 1861

Synonyms
- Chlorocrepis fendleri (Sch.Bip.) W.A.Weber; Crepis ambigua A.Gray 1849 not Balb. 1805; Heteropleura fendleri (Sch.Bip.) Rydb.; Hieracium arsenei S.F.Blake; Hieracium arsenia Blake

= Hieracium fendleri =

Species of flowering plant

Hieracium fendleri is a North American plant species in the tribe Cichorieae within the family Asteraceae. It is widespread across much of the western part of the continent, from the Black Hills of Wyoming and South Dakota south as far as Guatemala.

Hieracium fendleri is an herb up to 40 cm (16 in) tall, with leaves mostly in a rosette at the bottom. Leaves are up to 70 mm (2.8 in) long, sometimes with small teeth on the edges. One stalk will produce 2-5 flower heads in a flat-topped array. Each head has 15-30 pale yellow ray flowers but no disc flowers.
