= Brickellia adenolepis =

Scientific classification
- Kingdom: Plantae
- Clade: Tracheophytes
- Clade: Angiosperms
- Clade: Eudicots
- Clade: Asterids
- Order: Asterales
- Family: Asteraceae
- Genus: Brickellia
- Species: B. adenolepis

Binomial name
- Brickellia adenolepis (B.L.Rob.) Shinners

Synonyms
- Kuhnia adenolepis B.L.Rob.

Species of flowering plant

Brickellia adenolepis is a Mexican species of flowering plants in the family Asteraceae. It is native to west-central Mexico in the States of Zacatecas, Jalisco, and Aguascalientes.
