= Neohintonia =

Scientific classification
- Kingdom: Plantae
- Clade: Tracheophytes
- Clade: Angiosperms
- Clade: Eudicots
- Clade: Asterids
- Order: Asterales
- Family: Asteraceae
- Subfamily: Asteroideae
- Tribe: Eupatorieae
- Genus: Neohintonia; R.M.King & H.Rob.
- Species: N. monantha

Binomial name
- Neohintonia monantha (Sch.Bip.) R.M.King & H.Rob.

Synonyms
- Eupatorium monanthum Sch.Bip.; Koanophyllon monanthum (Sch.Bip.) T.J.Ayers & B.L.Turner

Genus of flowering plants

Neohintonia is a genus of flowering plants in the tribe Eupatorieae within the family Asteraceae.

Species

The only known species is Neohintonia monantha, native to the States of Colima, Durango, Oaxaca, México, Jalisco, Nayarit, Sinaloa, Sonora, and Guerrero in western Mexico.
