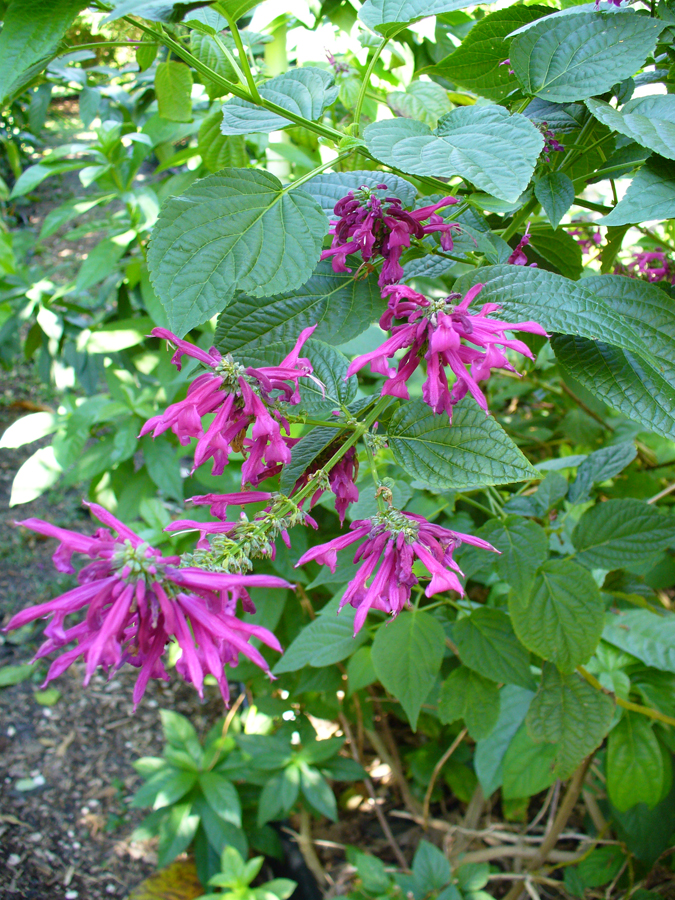

Scientific classification
- Kingdom: Plantae
- Clade: Tracheophytes
- Clade: Angiosperms
- Clade: Eudicots
- Clade: Asterids
- Order: Lamiales
- Family: Lamiaceae
- Genus: Salvia
- Species: S. purpurea

Binomial name
- Salvia purpurea Cav.

= Salvia purpurea =

Species of plant

Salvia purpurea is a herbaceous perennial that is native to several Mexican states and south into Guatemala, El Salvador, and Honduras. It was first described by Antonio José Cavanilles in 1793, though its use in horticulture is only recent and it is rarely sold by nurseries.

Salvia purpurea reaches up to 7 feet (2.1 m) in height, less in width, with ovate yellow-green leaves that have serrated edges. Inflorescences begin appearing in mid-autumn, with the plant blooming into winter. The flowers are a pinkish purple-violet, in tight verticils that look like they are unbalanced on one side of the flower spike. The 0.75 inches (19 mm) flowers are tightly packed at the end of many flowering branches.
