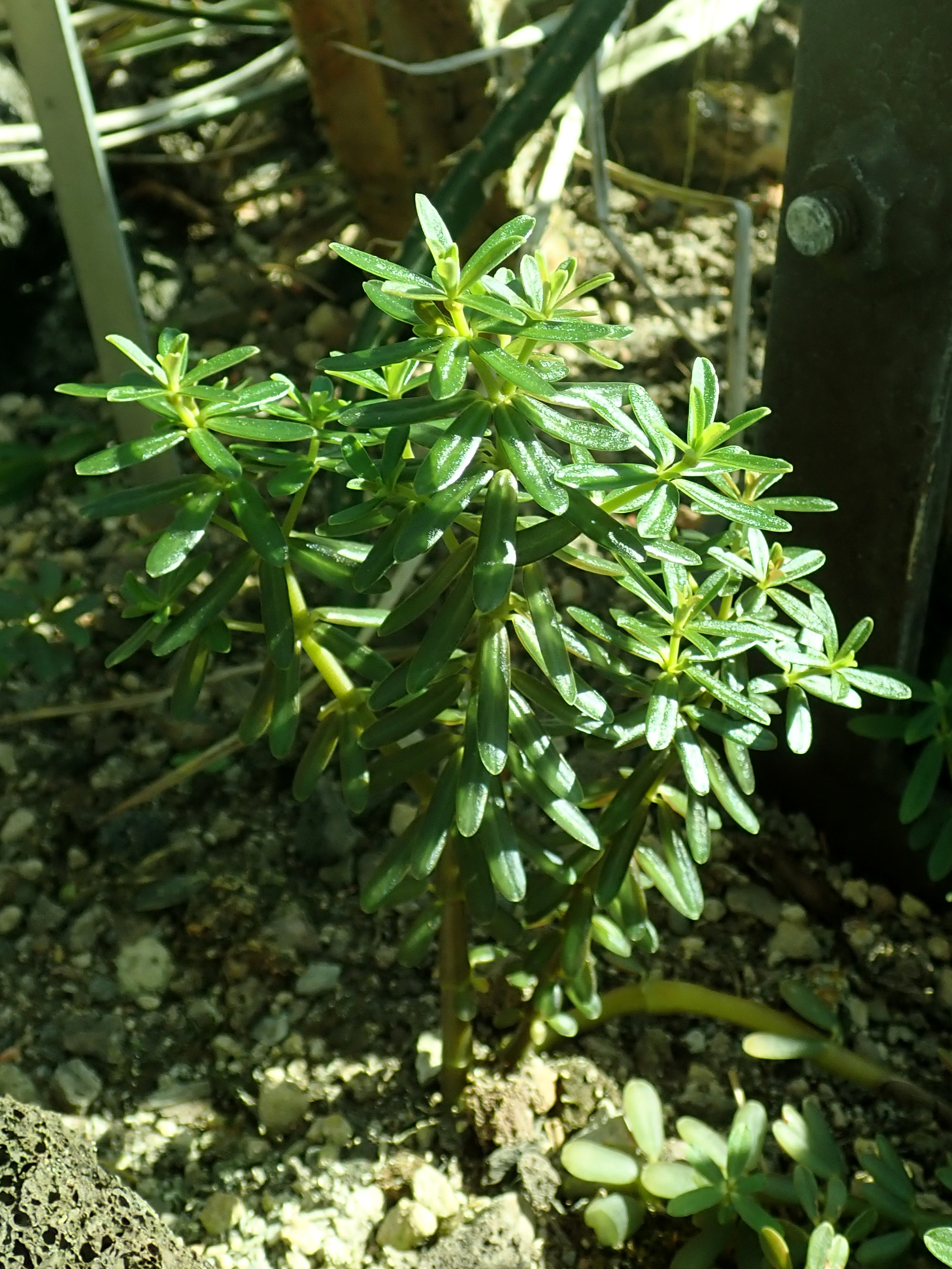
- Peperomia galioides, Berlin-Dahlem Botanical Garden

Conservation status
- Endangered (IUCN 3.1)

Scientific classification
- Kingdom: Plantae
- Clade: Tracheophytes
- Clade: Angiosperms
- Clade: Magnoliids
- Order: Piperales
- Family: Piperaceae
- Genus: Peperomia
- Species: P. galioides

Binomial name
- Peperomia galioides Kunth

= Peperomia galioides =

Species of plant

Peperomia galioides is a species of plant in the family Piperaceae, native to Mexico, Central America and South America. P. galioides has petioles of less than 1mm long and leaves between 5-30mm. There has been research in Colombia and Peru to know about the essential oils of this species. It was traditionally used in Peruvian herbal medicine.
