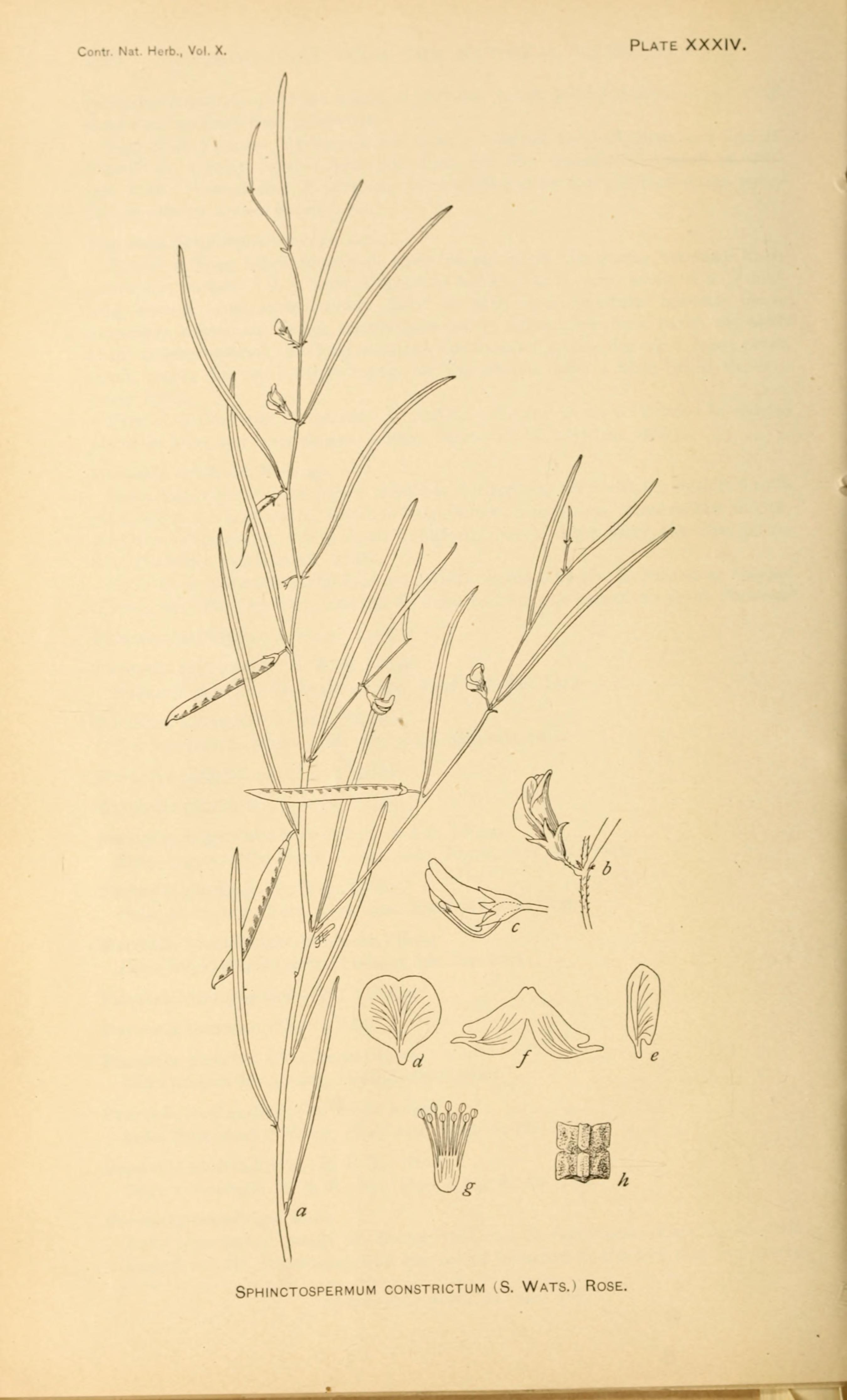

Conservation status
- Apparently Secure (NatureServe)

Scientific classification
- Kingdom: Plantae
- Clade: Embryophytes
- Clade: Tracheophytes
- Clade: Spermatophytes
- Clade: Angiosperms
- Clade: Eudicots
- Clade: Rosids
- Order: Fabales
- Family: Fabaceae
- Subfamily: Faboideae
- Tribe: Robinieae
- Genus: Sphinctospermum; Rose
- Species: S. constrictum

Binomial name
- Sphinctospermum constrictum (S.Watson) Rose

Synonyms
- Cracca constricta (S.Watson) Tidestr.; Tephrosia constricta S.Watson

= Sphinctospermum =

Genus of legumes

Sphinctospermum is a genus of flowering plants in the legume family, Fabaceae. It belongs to the subfamily Faboideae. It is a monotypic genus, containing the single species Sphinctospermum constrictum. It is native to North America, where it occurs in western and central Mexico and in Arizona in the southwestern United States. The plant is known by the common name hourglass peaseed.

This species occurs in grasslands and dry forests. It grows in sandy soils and is more common in wet years.
