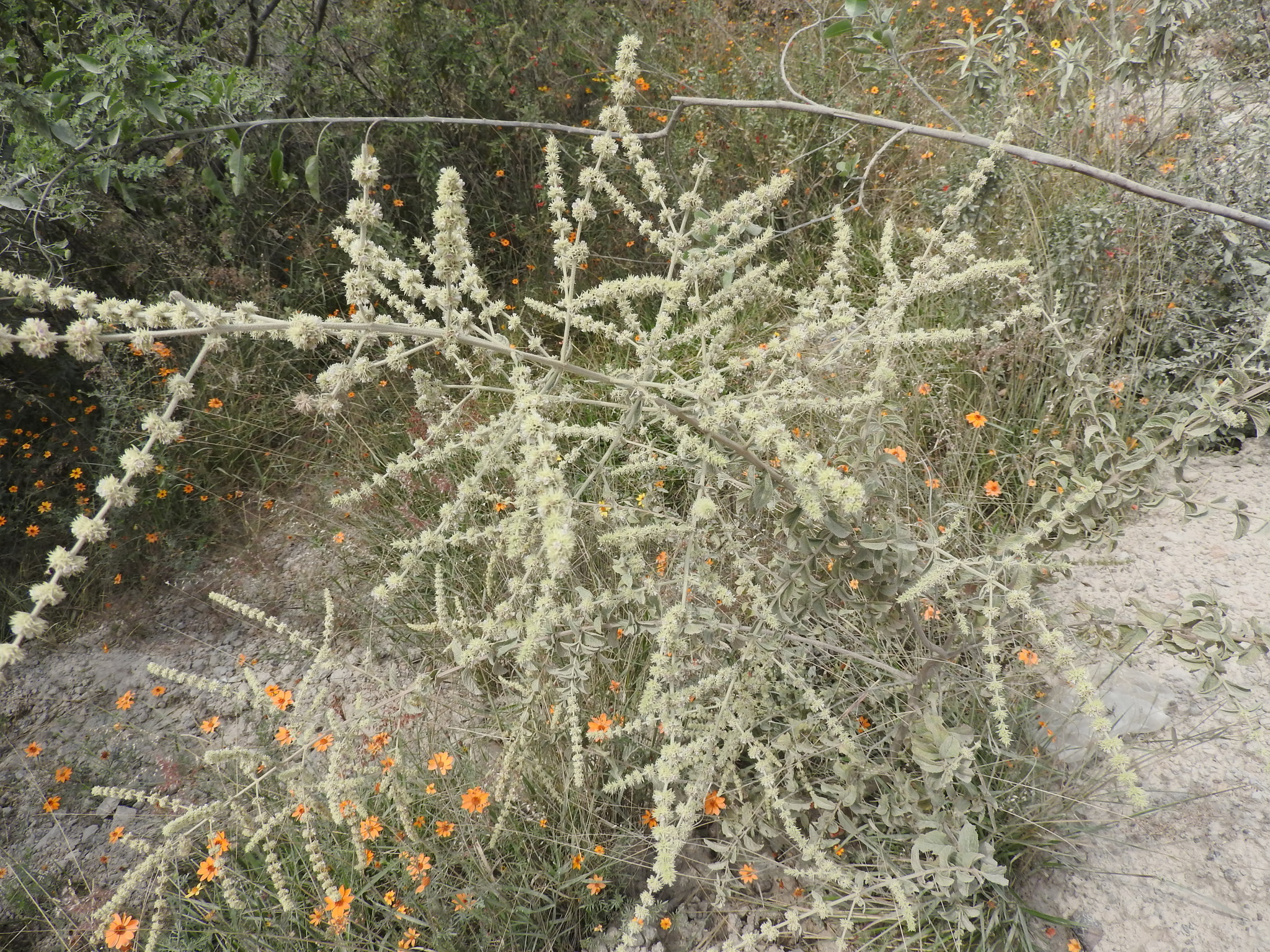
- Asterohyptis stellulata

Scientific classification
- Kingdom: Plantae
- Clade: Tracheophytes
- Clade: Angiosperms
- Clade: Eudicots
- Clade: Asterids
- Order: Lamiales
- Family: Lamiaceae
- Subfamily: Nepetoideae
- Tribe: Ocimeae
- Genus: Asterohyptis; Epling

= Asterohyptis =

Genus of flowering plants

Asterohyptis is a genus of plants in the Lamiaceae, or mint family, first described in 1932. It is native to Mexico and Central America.

Species

- Asterohyptis mocinoana (Benth.) Epling - widespread from Veracruz to Costa Rica
- Asterohyptis nayarana B.L.Turner - Durango, Nayarit
- Asterohyptis seemannii (A.Gray) Epling - Chihuahua, Sonora, Sinaloa
- Asterohyptis stellulata (Benth.) Epling - from Sinaloa and Durango south to Honduras
