= Erigeron velutipes =

Conservation status
- Secure (NatureServe)

Scientific classification
- Kingdom: Plantae
- Clade: Tracheophytes
- Clade: Angiosperms
- Clade: Eudicots
- Clade: Asterids
- Order: Asterales
- Family: Asteraceae
- Genus: Erigeron
- Species: E. velutipes

Binomial name
- Erigeron velutipes S.L.Welsh & Goodrich 1983

Synonyms
- Erigeron alamosanus Rose

Species of flowering plant

Erigeron velutipes is a North American species of flowering plant in the family Asteraceae known by the common names delicate fleabane and Chihuahuan fleabane.

It is native to northern and southwestern Mexico, including in the states of Sonora, Nayarit, Michoacán, and Jalisco) and just over the United States border into Santa Cruz County, Arizona.

Erigeron velutipes grows in moist locations near springs. It is an annual herb up to 20 centimeters (8 inches) tall, producing a taproot. The inflorescence is made up of 1-3 flower heads per stem. Each head contains 50–75; white or blue ray florets surrounding numerous yellow disc florets.
