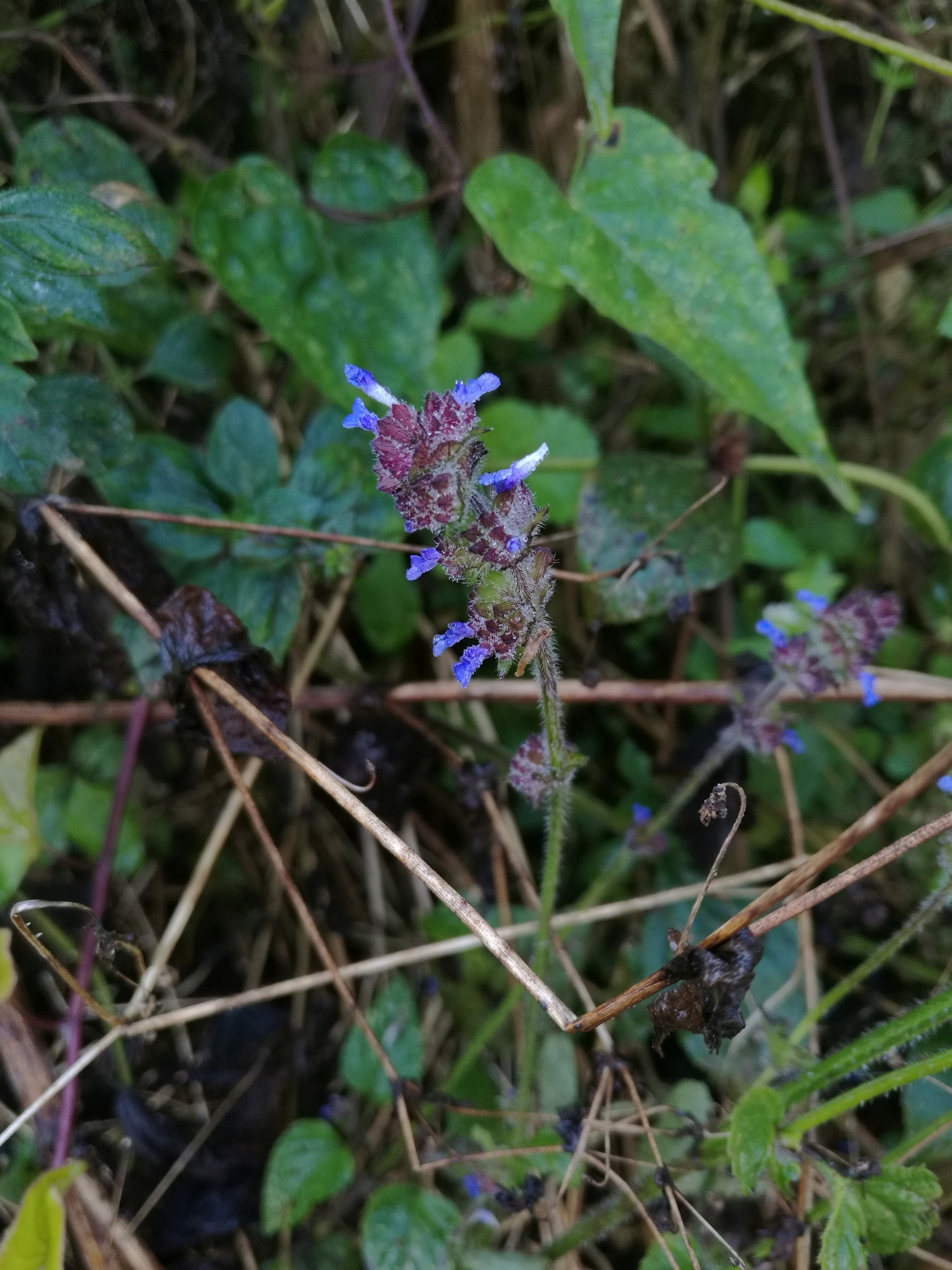

Scientific classification
- Kingdom: Plantae
- Clade: Tracheophytes
- Clade: Angiosperms
- Clade: Eudicots
- Clade: Asterids
- Order: Lamiales
- Family: Lamiaceae
- Genus: Salvia
- Species: S. lasiocephala

Binomial name
- Salvia lasiocephala Hook. & Arn.

Synonyms
- S. hyptoides Mart. & Gal. S. multispicata Rusby

= Salvia lasiocephala =

Species of herb

Salvia lasiocephala is an annual herb that is broadly distributed throughout the tropical Americas. It grows up to 60 cm (24 in) high, with long-petiolate, ovate-triangular leaves that are 2.5 to 4 cm (0.98 to 1.57 in) long and wide. The inflorescence of terminal racemes has flowers with a pink to pale lilac or blue corolla that is 5 mm (0.20 in) long.
