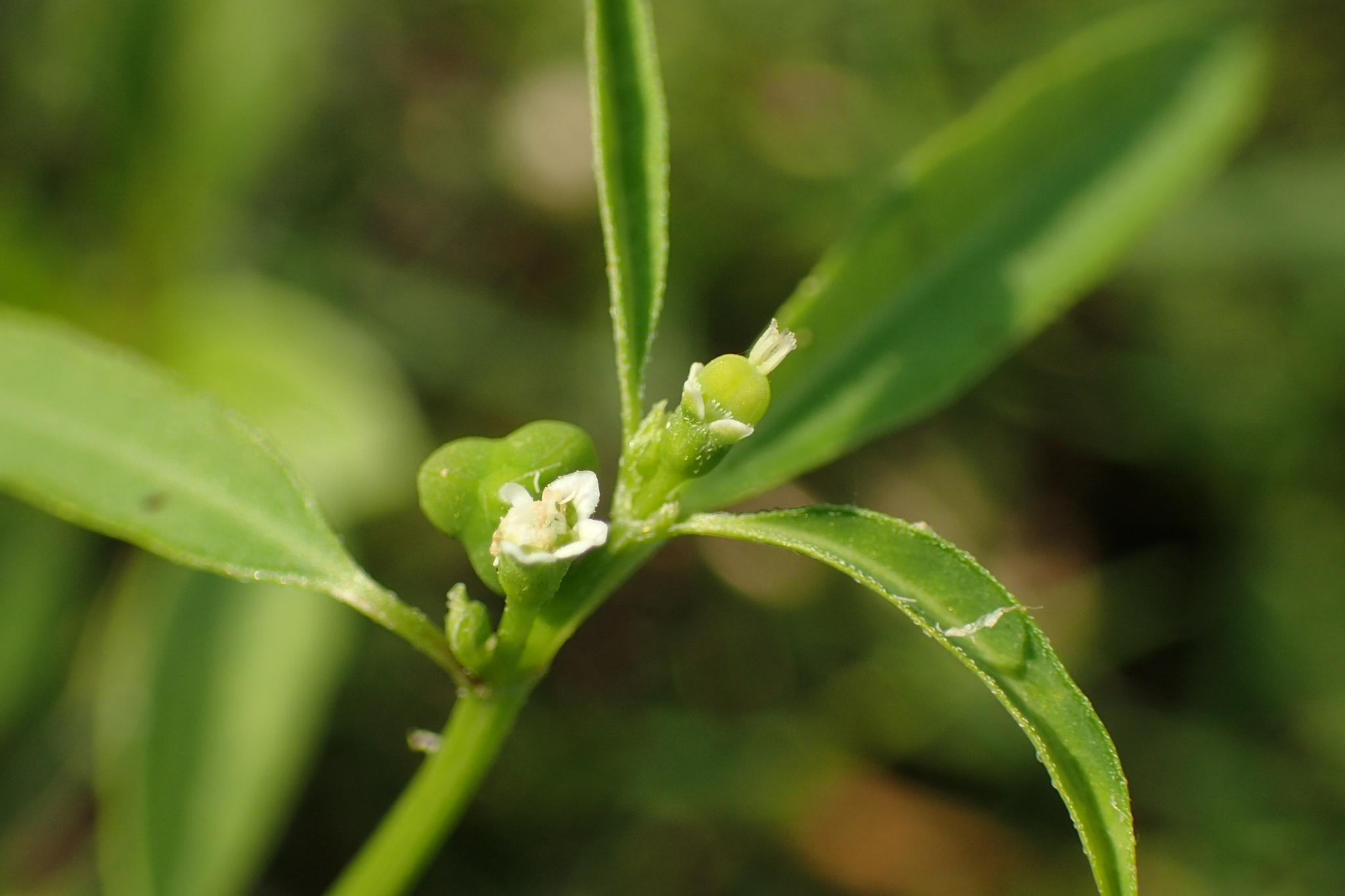

Conservation status
- Apparently Secure (NatureServe)

Scientific classification
- Kingdom: Plantae
- Clade: Tracheophytes
- Clade: Angiosperms
- Clade: Eudicots
- Clade: Rosids
- Order: Malpighiales
- Family: Euphorbiaceae
- Genus: Euphorbia
- Species: E. graminea

Binomial name
- Euphorbia graminea Jacq.

Synonyms
- Adenopetalum gramineum (Jacq.) Klotzsch & Garcke; Agaloma graminea (Jacq.) D.B.Ward; Eumecanthus gramineus (Jacq.) Millsp.

= Euphorbia graminea =

Species of flowering plant

Euphorbia graminea is a species of plant in the Euphorbia genus and Euphorbiaceae family. It is native to Mexico, Central America, the Caribbean (Cuba, the Dominican Republic, Windward Islands, Aruba, and the Netherlands Antilles), Andean South America (Colombia, Venezuela, Ecuador, Peru, Bolivia, and northwestern Argentina), Suriname, and French Guiana.
