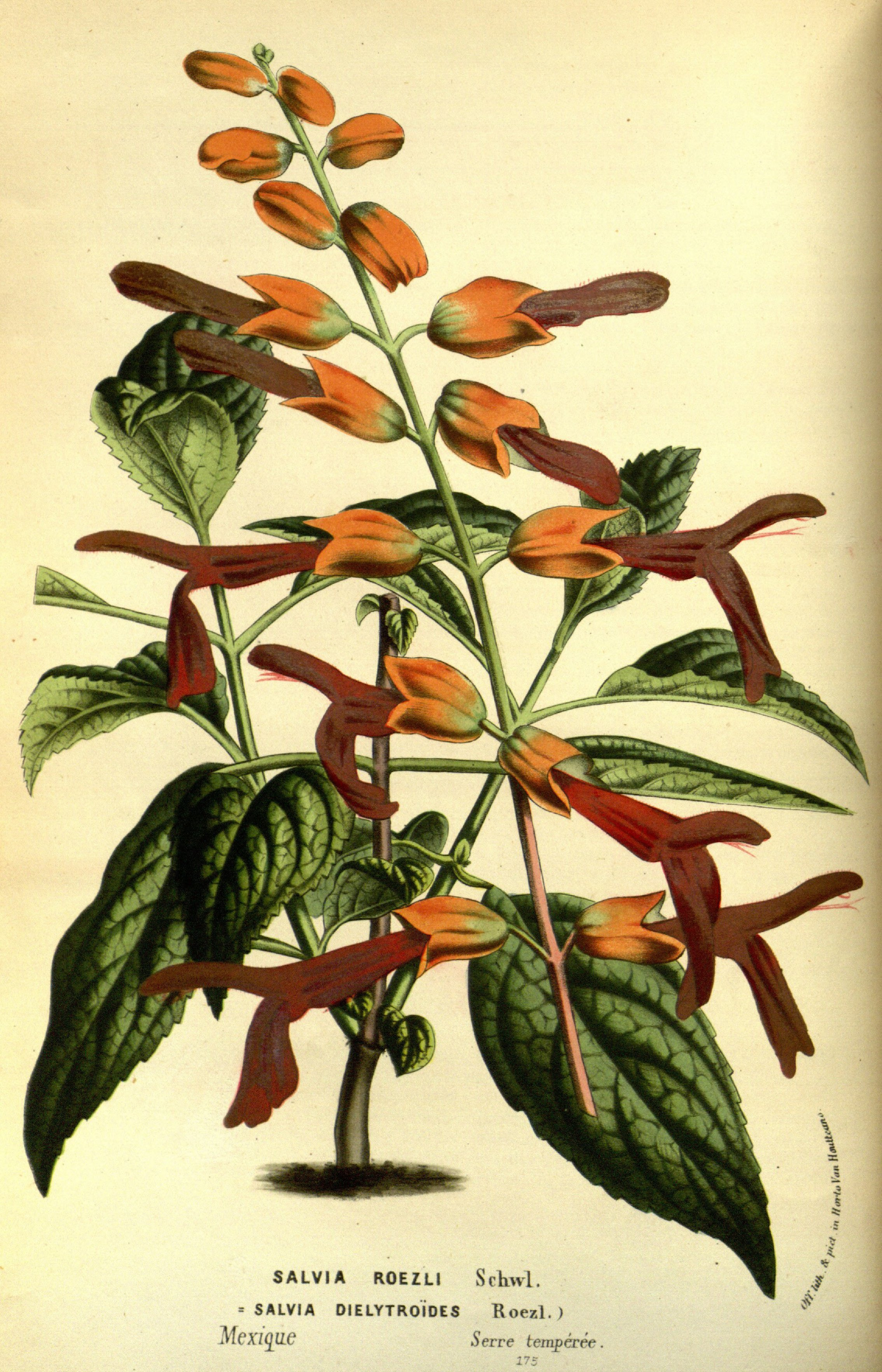

Scientific classification
- Kingdom: Plantae
- Clade: Tracheophytes
- Clade: Angiosperms
- Clade: Eudicots
- Clade: Asterids
- Order: Lamiales
- Family: Lamiaceae
- Genus: Salvia
- Species: S. sessei

Binomial name
- Salvia sessei Benth.

= Salvia sessei =

Species of flowering plant

Salvia sessei is a perennial that grows in several states in central Mexico between 600 and 7,000 feet elevation on the edge of pine forests and woodlands. It was first collected by the Spanish botanist Martín Sessé y Lacasta and the Mexican-born Spanish naturalist José Mariano Mociño. The two were part of the Royal Botanical Expedition of 1777 sent by King Charles III of Spain to Guatemala and Mexico.

Salvia sessei is a large shrub that reaches up to 15 feet in its native habitat and half that size in cultivation. The fresh-green colored deltoid leaves vary in size, but are generally between 2 and 5 inches long. The flowers are a blend of soft red and chartreuse that is similar to those of Salvia regla. The plant is very sensitive to frost.
