= Cynanchum unifarium =

Scientific classification
- Kingdom: Plantae
- Clade: Tracheophytes
- Clade: Angiosperms
- Clade: Eudicots
- Clade: Asterids
- Order: Gentianales
- Family: Apocynaceae
- Genus: Cynanchum
- Species: C. unifarium

Binomial name
- Cynanchum unifarium (Scheele) Woods

Species of vine

Cynanchum unifarium is a species of vine belonging to the family Apocynaceae.
