= Brickellia stolonifera =

Scientific classification
- Kingdom: Plantae
- Clade: Tracheophytes
- Clade: Angiosperms
- Clade: Eudicots
- Clade: Asterids
- Order: Asterales
- Family: Asteraceae
- Genus: Brickellia
- Species: B. stolonifera

Binomial name
- Brickellia stolonifera B.L.Turner

Species of flowering plant

Brickellia stolonifera is a Mexican species of flowering plants in the family Asteraceae. It has been found only in the state of Coahuila in north-central Mexico.

Brickellia stolonifera is similar to a species from nearby Chihuahua, B. simplex, but it has opposite leaves and flower heads grouped at the end of branches instead of in the axils of the leaves.
