= Eupatorium paniculatum =

Eupatorium paniculatum is a taxonomic synonym that may refer to:

- Eupatorium paniculatum Lindl. ex DC. = Brenandendron donianum
- Eupatorium paniculatum Mill. = Brickellia paniculata
