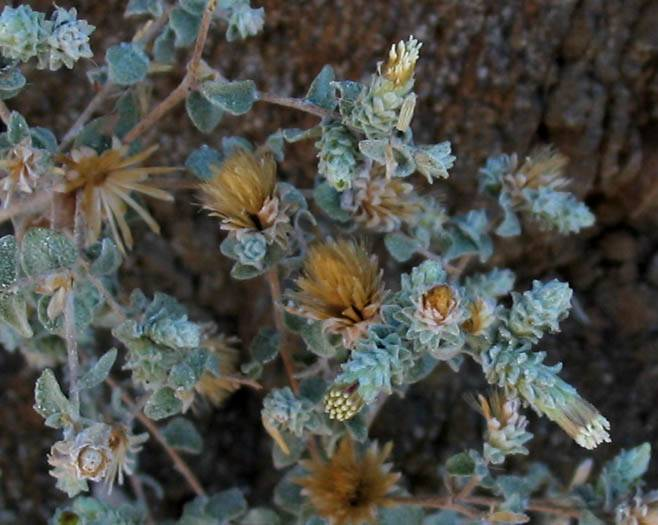

Scientific classification
- Kingdom: Plantae
- Clade: Tracheophytes
- Clade: Angiosperms
- Clade: Eudicots
- Clade: Asterids
- Order: Asterales
- Family: Asteraceae
- Genus: Brickellia
- Species: B. nevinii

Binomial name
- Brickellia nevinii A.Gray

Synonyms
- Coleosanthus nevinii (A.Gray) A.Heller

= Brickellia nevinii =

Species of flowering plant

Brickellia nevinii is a species of flowering plant in the family Asteraceae known by the common name Nevin's brickellbush. It is endemic to southern California, where it is an uncommon resident of desert and mountain scrub plant communities.

Brickellia nevinii is an erect shrub reaching heights between 3 and 5 meters. The dense, tangling branches and foliage are coated in gray woolly fibers. The small leaves are oval to heart-shaped, toothed along the edges, and generally under two centimeters long.

The shrub flowers in clusters of flower heads each about 1.5 centimeters long. The head is cylindrical to conical and wrapped in layers of gray woolly phyllaries whose tips curl out from the flower head. The head contains about 23 dull white to reddish-tinted yellow disc florets that stick out from the tip. The fruit is a hairy achene about 4 millimeters long with a pappus of bristles.

The species is named for Rev. Joseph Cook Nevin
