= Brickellia seemannii =

Scientific classification
- Kingdom: Plantae
- Clade: Tracheophytes
- Clade: Angiosperms
- Clade: Eudicots
- Clade: Asterids
- Order: Asterales
- Family: Asteraceae
- Genus: Brickellia
- Species: B. seemannii

Binomial name
- Brickellia seemannii A.Gray

Synonyms
- Coleosanthus seemannii (A.Gray) Kuntze

Species of flowering plant

Brickellia seemannii is a Mexican species of flowering plants in the family Asteraceae. It is native to northwestern Mexico in the state of Sinaloa.

The species is named for German botanist Berthold Carl Seemann, 1825 - 1871. The species inhabits terrestrial environments.
