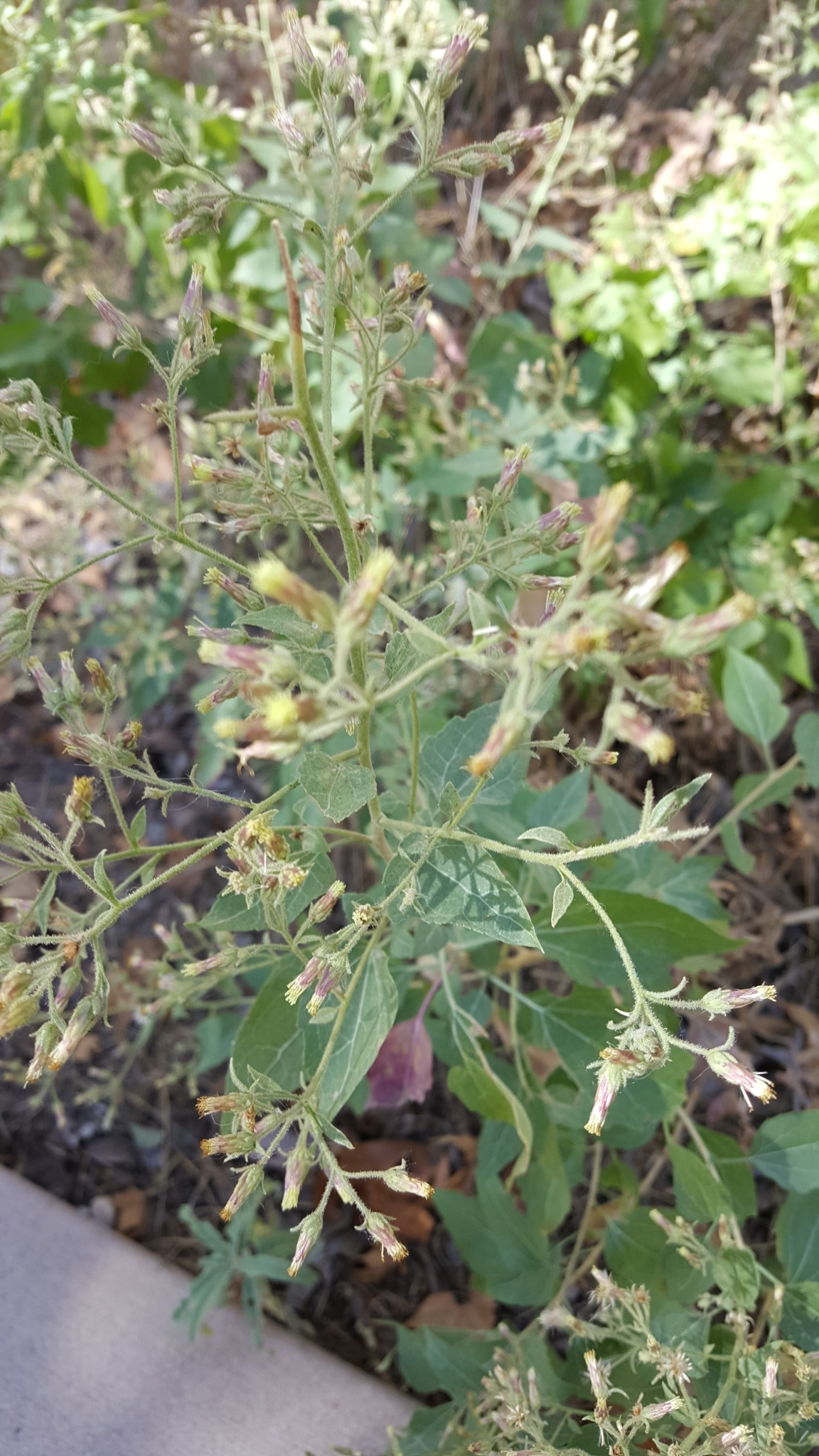

Scientific classification
- Kingdom: Plantae
- Clade: Tracheophytes
- Clade: Angiosperms
- Clade: Eudicots
- Clade: Asterids
- Order: Asterales
- Family: Asteraceae
- Genus: Brickellia
- Species: B. floribunda

Binomial name
- Brickellia floribunda A.Gray

Synonyms
- Coleosanthus floribundus (A.Gray) Kuntze

= Brickellia floribunda =

Species of flowering plant

Brickellia floribunda, the Chihuahuan brickellbush, is a North American species of flowering plants in the family Asteraceae. It is native to northern Mexico (Baja California Sur, Sonora and Chihuahua) and the south-western United States (Arizona and New Mexico).

Brickellia floribunda is a branching shrub up to 200 cm (80 inches) tall. The plant produces many small flower heads with white or pale yellow-green disc florets but no ray florets.
