= Brickellia glandulosa =

Scientific classification
- Kingdom: Plantae
- Clade: Tracheophytes
- Clade: Angiosperms
- Clade: Eudicots
- Clade: Asterids
- Order: Asterales
- Family: Asteraceae
- Genus: Brickellia
- Species: B. glandulosa

Binomial name
- Brickellia glandulosa (La Llave) McVaugh

Synonyms
- Rosalesia glandulosa La Llave; Brickellia hebecarpoides B.L.Rob.; Brickellia pacayensis J.M.Coult.; Coleosanthus glandulosus (La Llave) Kuntze; Coleosanthus pacayensis (J.M.Coult.) J.M.Coult.; Eupatorium rosalesia DC.; Ismaria glandulosa (La Llave) Raf.

Species of flowering plant

Brickellia glandulosa is a Mesoamerican species of flowering plants in the family Asteraceae. It is widespread from San Luis Potosí south to Nicaragua.
