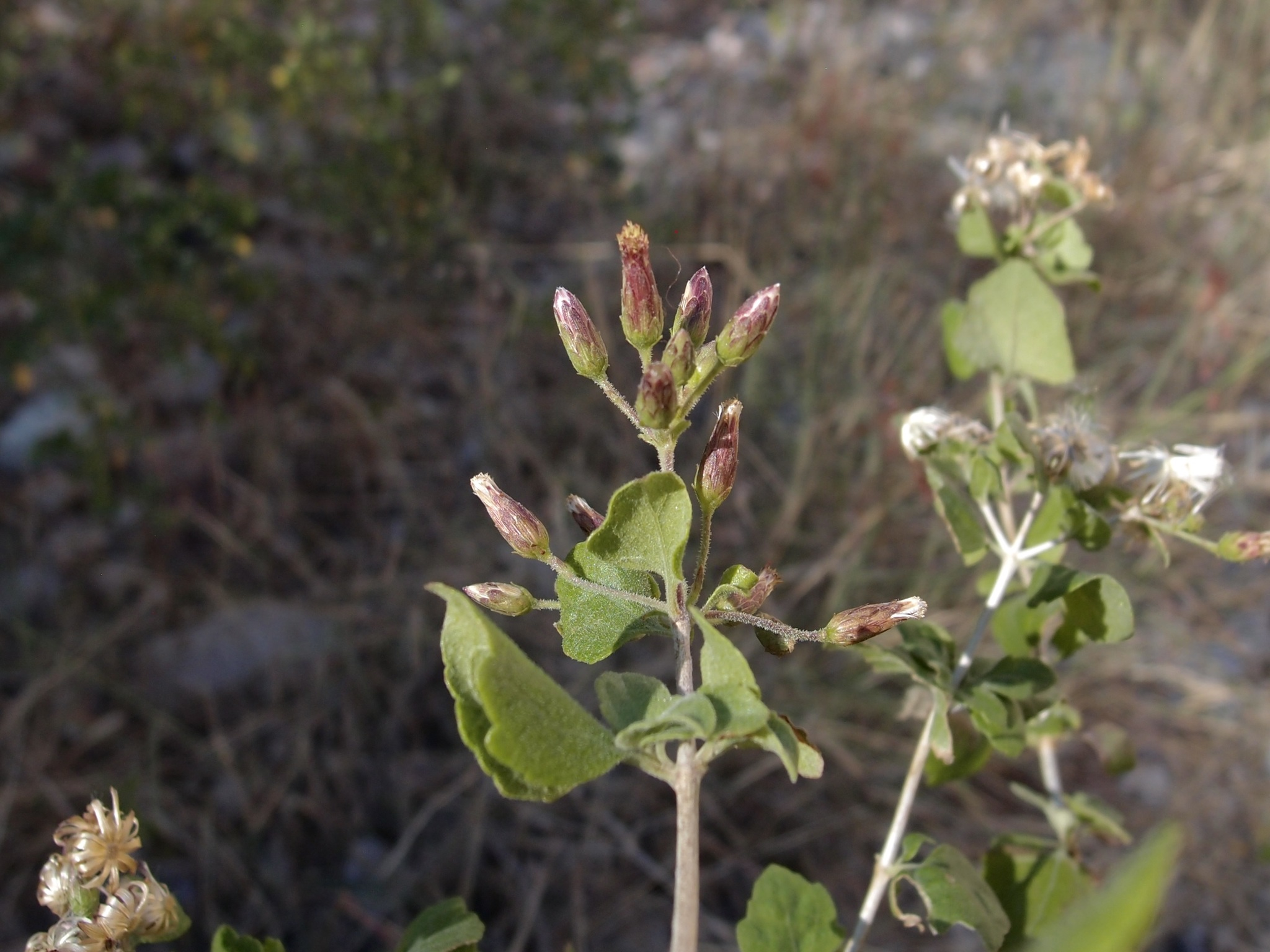

Scientific classification
- Kingdom: Plantae
- Clade: Tracheophytes
- Clade: Angiosperms
- Clade: Eudicots
- Clade: Asterids
- Order: Asterales
- Family: Asteraceae
- Genus: Brickellia
- Species: B. rhomboidea

Binomial name
- Brickellia rhomboidea Greene

Synonyms
- Coleosanthus rhomboideus (Greene) Greene

= Brickellia rhomboidea =

Species of flowering plant

Brickellia rhomboidea is a Mexican species of flowering plant in the family Asteraceae. It is native to the state of Sonora in northwestern Mexico, found along the shores of the Gulf of California including on offshore islands.

Brickellia rhomboidea is a loosely branching shrub up to 150 cm (5 feet) tall.
