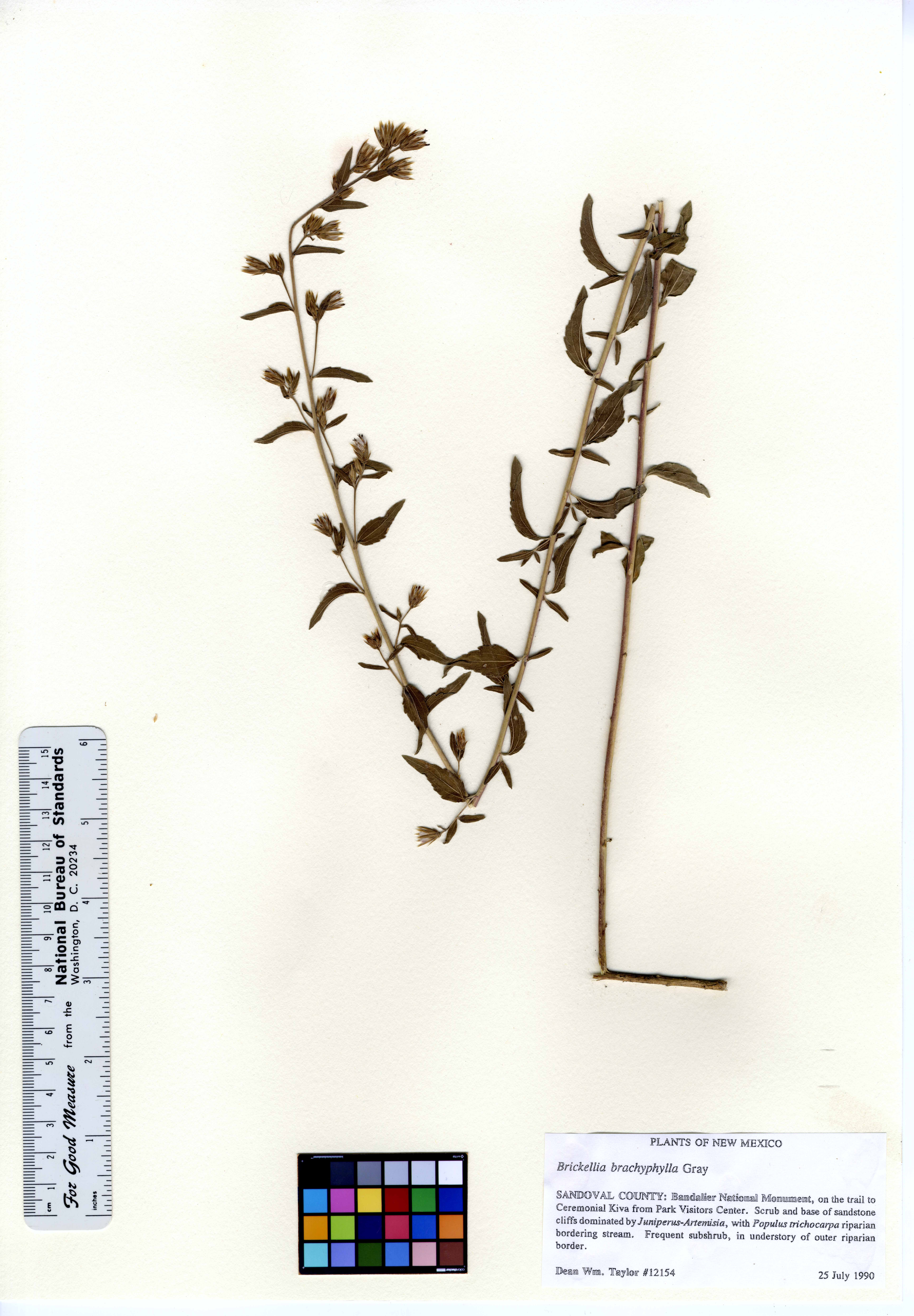
- Photo of herbarium specimen collected in New Mexico

Conservation status
- Secure (NatureServe)

Scientific classification
- Kingdom: Plantae
- Clade: Tracheophytes
- Clade: Angiosperms
- Clade: Eudicots
- Clade: Asterids
- Order: Asterales
- Family: Asteraceae
- Genus: Brickellia
- Species: B. brachyphylla

Binomial name
- Brickellia brachyphylla (A.Gray) A.Gray

Synonyms
- Brickellia hinckleyi Standl.; Clavigera brachyphylla A.Gray; Coleosanthus brachyphyllus (A.Gray) Kuntze

= Brickellia brachyphylla =

Species of flowering plant

Brickellia brachyphylla, the plumed brickellbush or Hinckley's brickellbush, is a North American species of flowering plant in the family Asteraceae. It is native to the southwestern United States, in Arizona, New Mexico, Colorado, western Texas, and the Oklahoma Panhandle. There are reports that it formerly occurred in southwestern Kansas, but these populations appear to be extinct.

Brickellia brachyphylla is a shrub up to 100 cm (40 inches) tall, growing from a woody caudex. It produces many small flower heads with pale green disc florets but no ray florets.
