= Brickellia monocephala =

Scientific classification
- Kingdom: Plantae
- Clade: Tracheophytes
- Clade: Angiosperms
- Clade: Eudicots
- Clade: Asterids
- Order: Asterales
- Family: Asteraceae
- Genus: Brickellia
- Species: B. monocephala

Binomial name
- Brickellia monocephala B.L.Rob.

Species of flowering plant

Brickellia monocephala is a North American species of flowering plants in the family Asteraceae. It is widespread across much of Mexico from Hidalgo and Durango south as far as Oaxaca. The species is unusual in the genus in having only one relatively large flower head per stalk rather than several small ones.
