= Brickellia lanata =

Scientific classification
- Kingdom: Plantae
- Clade: Tracheophytes
- Clade: Angiosperms
- Clade: Eudicots
- Clade: Asterids
- Order: Asterales
- Family: Asteraceae
- Genus: Brickellia
- Species: B. lanata

Binomial name
- Brickellia lanata (DC.) A.Gray

Synonyms
- Brickellia lanata var. microdonta B.L.Rob.; Bulbostylis lanata DC.; Bulbostylis rigida Hook. & Arn.; Coleosanthus lanatus (DC.) Kuntze; Coleosanthus lanatus var. microdontus (B.L.Rob.) S.F.Blake

Species of flowering plant

Brickellia lanata is a Mexican species of flowering plants in the family Asteraceae. It is native to western Mexico from Sinaloa south to Colima, and as far east as Zacatecas.
