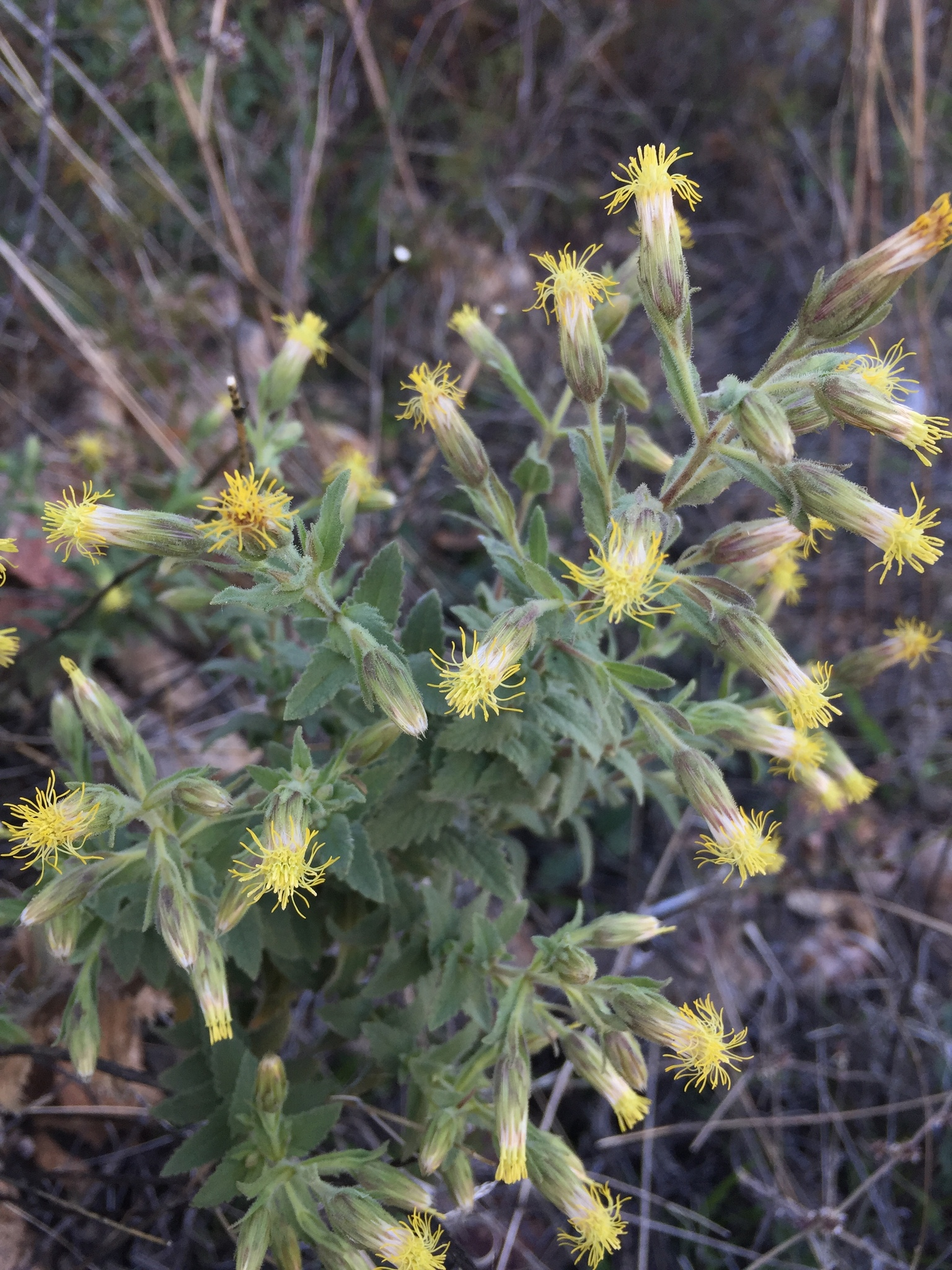

Scientific classification
- Kingdom: Plantae
- Clade: Tracheophytes
- Clade: Angiosperms
- Clade: Eudicots
- Clade: Asterids
- Order: Asterales
- Family: Asteraceae
- Genus: Brickellia
- Species: B. wislizeni

Binomial name
- Brickellia wislizeni A.Gray

= Brickellia wislizeni =

Species of flowering plant

Brickellia wislizeni is a Mexican species of flowering plants in the family Asteraceae. It is native to the states of Chihuahua and Durango in north-central Mexico.

formerly included

- Brickellia wislizeni var. lanceolata A.Gray, now called Brickellia amplexicaulis B.L.Rob.
