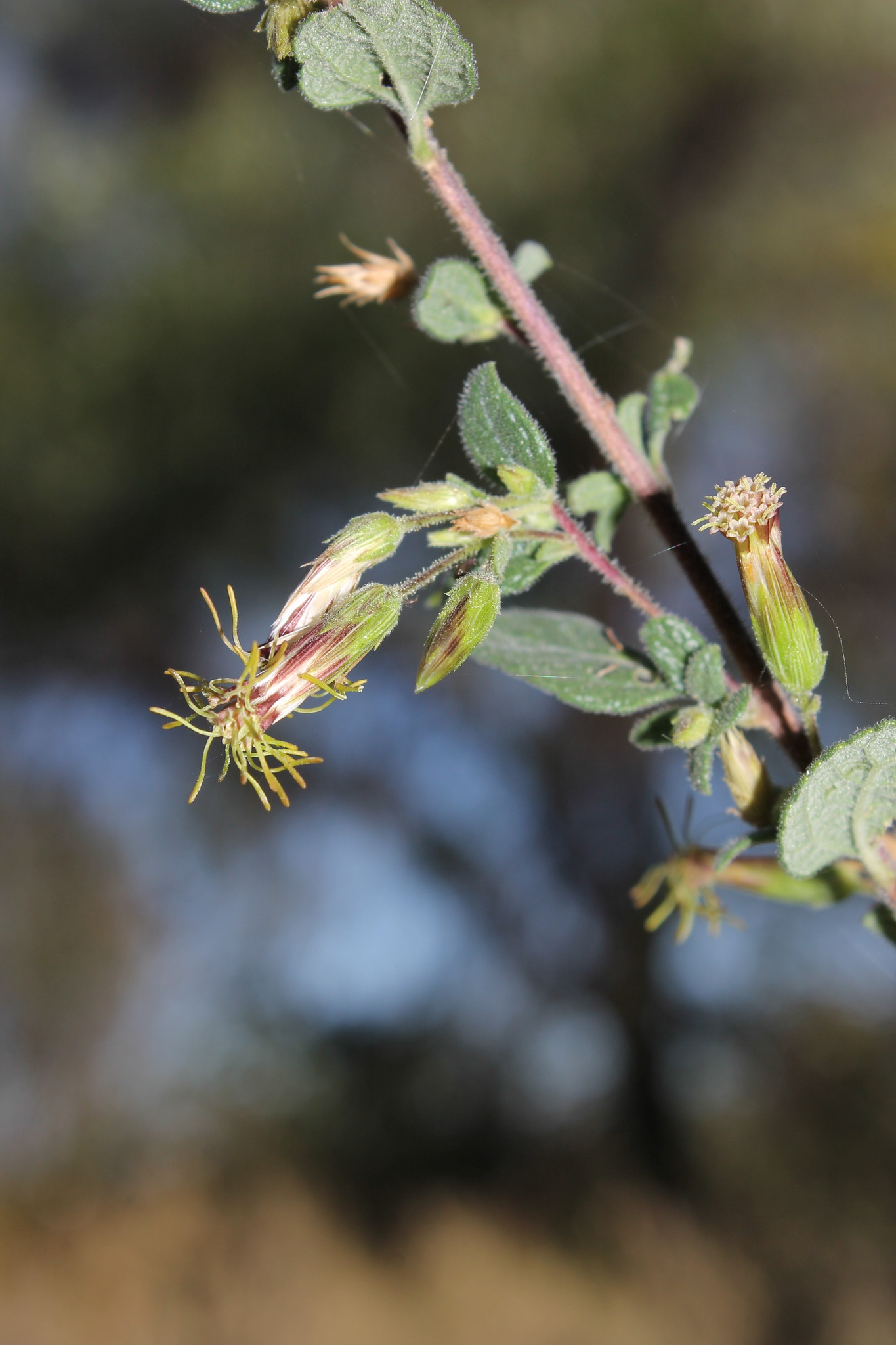
- Brickellia secundiflora var. nepetifolia

Scientific classification
- Kingdom: Plantae
- Clade: Tracheophytes
- Clade: Angiosperms
- Clade: Eudicots
- Clade: Asterids
- Order: Asterales
- Family: Asteraceae
- Genus: Brickellia
- Species: B. secundiflora

Binomial name
- Brickellia secundiflora (Lag.) A.Gray

Synonyms
- Synonymy: Brickellia saltillensis B.L.Rob.; Bulbostylis scorodoniaefolia Kunth; Bulbostylis scorodoniifolia Kunth; Bulbostylis secundiflora (Lag.) DC.; Coleosanthus parryi var. micaceus (B.L.Rob.) S.F.Blake; Coleosanthus saltillensis (B.L.Rob.) S.F.Blake; Coleosanthus secundiflorus (Lag.) Kuntze; Eupatorium nepetaefolium Kunth, syn of var. nepetifolia; Eupatorium secundiflorum Lag.; Brickellia palmeri var. amphothrix B.L.Rob., syn of var. nepetifolia; Coleosanthus palmeri var. amphothrix (B.L.Rob.) S.F.Blake, syn of var. nepetifolia; Eupatorium nepetifolium Kunth, syn of var. nepetifolia

= Brickellia secundiflora =

Species of flowering plant

Brickellia secundiflora is a Mexican species of flowering plants in the family Asteraceae. It is native to central and northeastern Mexico from Tamaulipas west to Coahuila and south as far as Oaxaca.

Varieties

- Brickellia secundiflora var. nepetifolia (Kunth) B.L.Rob.
- Brickellia secundiflora var. secundiflora
