= Brickellia oliganthes =

Scientific classification
- Kingdom: Plantae
- Clade: Tracheophytes
- Clade: Angiosperms
- Clade: Eudicots
- Clade: Asterids
- Order: Asterales
- Family: Asteraceae
- Genus: Brickellia
- Species: B. oliganthes

Binomial name
- Brickellia oliganthes (Less.) A.Gray

Synonyms
- Brickellia kellermanii f. podocephala B.L.Rob.; Bulbostylis oliganthes (Less.) DC.; Bulbostylis reticulata DC.; Coleosanthus oliganthus (Less.) Kuntze; Coleosanthus polyanthemus Greene; Coleosanthus verbenaceus Greene; Eupatorium oliganthes Less.

Species of flowering plant

Brickellia oliganthes is a Mesoamerican species of flowering plants in the family Asteraceae. It is widespread from northern Mexico (Tamaulipas, Nuevo León, Durango, Sinaloa) south as far as Honduras.
