= Brickellia viejensis =

Scientific classification
- Kingdom: Plantae
- Clade: Tracheophytes
- Clade: Angiosperms
- Clade: Eudicots
- Clade: Asterids
- Order: Asterales
- Family: Asteraceae
- Genus: Brickellia
- Species: B. viejensis

Binomial name
- Brickellia viejensis Flyr

Species of flowering plant

Brickellia viejensis is a North American species of flowering plants in the family Asteraceae. It is native to the Sierra Tierra Vieja in Presidio County, western Texas.

Brickellia viejensis is a perennial herb up to 60 cm (24 inches) tall.
