= Brickellia vollmeri =

Scientific classification
- Kingdom: Plantae
- Clade: Tracheophytes
- Clade: Angiosperms
- Clade: Eudicots
- Clade: Asterids
- Order: Asterales
- Family: Asteraceae
- Genus: Brickellia
- Species: B. vollmeri

Binomial name
- Brickellia vollmeri Wiggins

Species of flowering plant

Brickellia vollmeri is a Mexican species of flowering plants in the family Asteraceae. It is native to northwestern Mexico in the state of Baja California.
