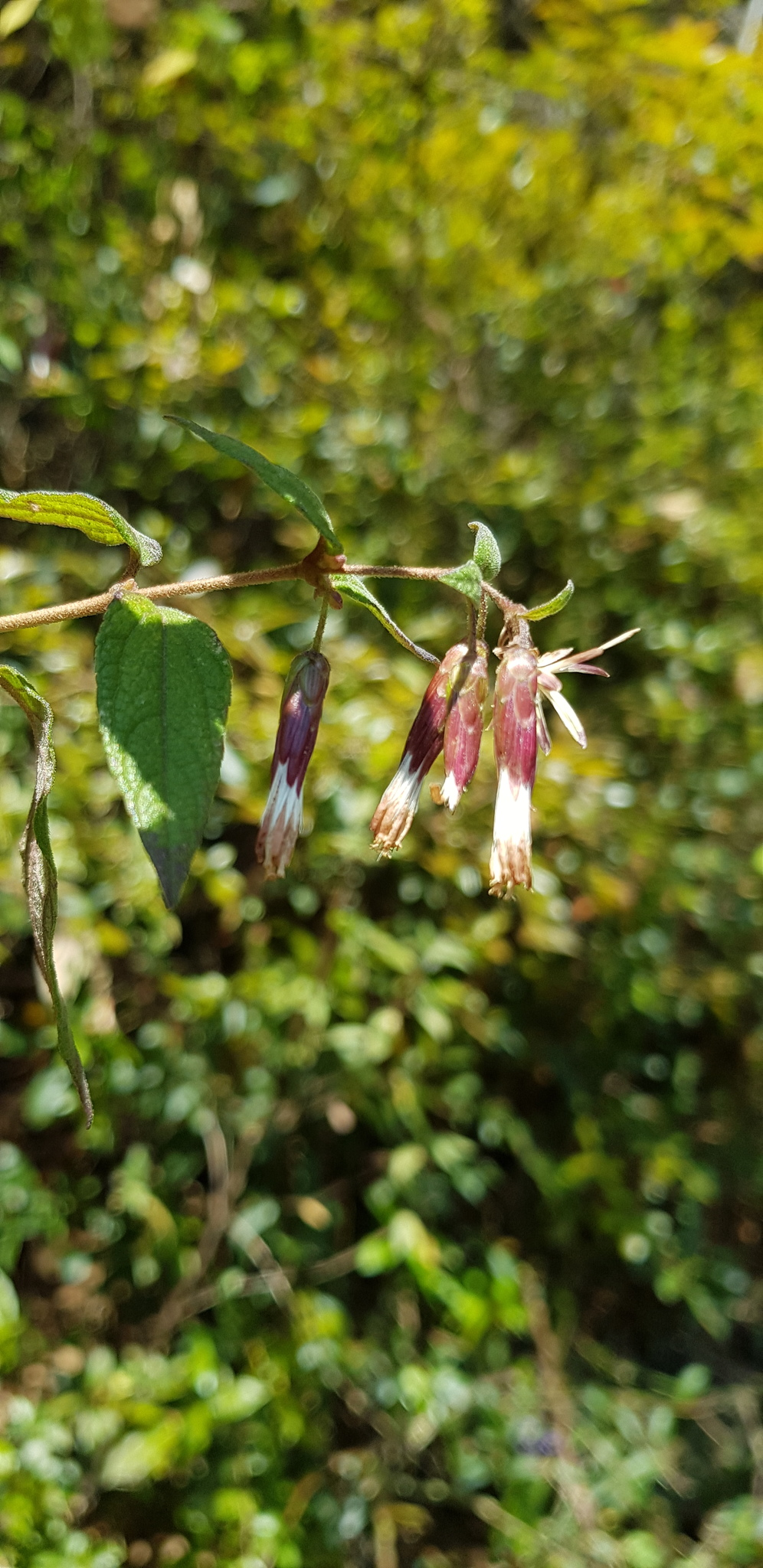

Scientific classification
- Kingdom: Plantae
- Clade: Tracheophytes
- Clade: Angiosperms
- Clade: Eudicots
- Clade: Asterids
- Order: Asterales
- Family: Asteraceae
- Genus: Brickellia
- Species: B. pendula

Binomial name
- Brickellia pendula (Schrad.) A.Gray

Synonyms
- Bulbostylis pendula DC.; Coleosanthus pendulus Kuntze; Eupatorium pendulum Schrad.; Eupatorium scariosum Wall. ex DC.

= Brickellia pendula =

Species of flowering plant

Brickellia pendula is a Mexican species of flowering plants in the family Asteraceae. It is native to central and northeastern Mexico, (Tamaulipas, Veracruz, Hidalgo, D.F., México, Morelos, Oaxaca, Michoacán).
