= Brickellia coixtlahuaca =

Scientific classification
- Kingdom: Plantae
- Clade: Tracheophytes
- Clade: Angiosperms
- Clade: Eudicots
- Clade: Asterids
- Order: Asterales
- Family: Asteraceae
- Genus: Brickellia
- Species: B. coixtlahuaca

Binomial name
- Brickellia coixtlahuaca B.L.Turner

Species of flowering plant

Brickellia coixtlahuaca is a Mexican species of flowering plant in the family Asteraceae. It is native to the State of Oaxaca in southwestern Mexico.
