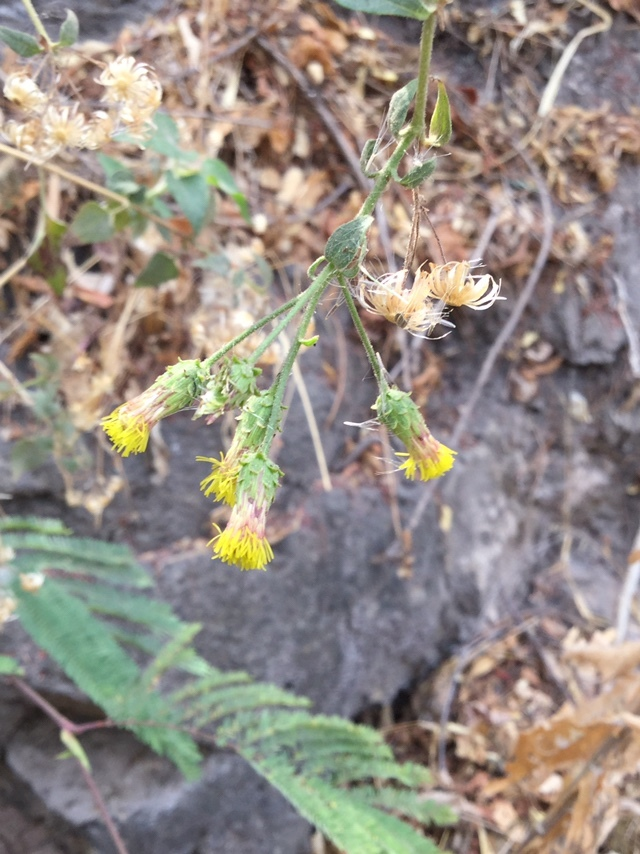

Scientific classification
- Kingdom: Plantae
- Clade: Tracheophytes
- Clade: Angiosperms
- Clade: Eudicots
- Clade: Asterids
- Order: Asterales
- Family: Asteraceae
- Genus: Brickellia
- Species: B. cardiophylla

Binomial name
- Brickellia cardiophylla B.L.Rob.

Synonyms
- Brickellia diffusa M.E.Jones 1933, illegitimate homonym not (Vahl) A. Gray 1852

= Brickellia cardiophylla =

Species of flowering plant

Brickellia cardiophylla is a Mexican species of flowering plant in the family Asteraceae. It is native to western Mexico in the states of Nayarit and Jalisco.
