= Brickellia robinsoniana =

Scientific classification
- Kingdom: Plantae
- Clade: Tracheophytes
- Clade: Angiosperms
- Clade: Eudicots
- Clade: Asterids
- Order: Asterales
- Family: Asteraceae
- Genus: Brickellia
- Species: B. robinsoniana

Binomial name
- Brickellia robinsoniana S.F.Blake

Species of flowering plant

Brickellia robinsoniana is a Mexican species of flowering plants in the family Asteraceae. It is native to north-central Mexico in the state of Zacatecas.

The species is named for American botanist Benjamin Lincoln Robinson, 1864–1935.
