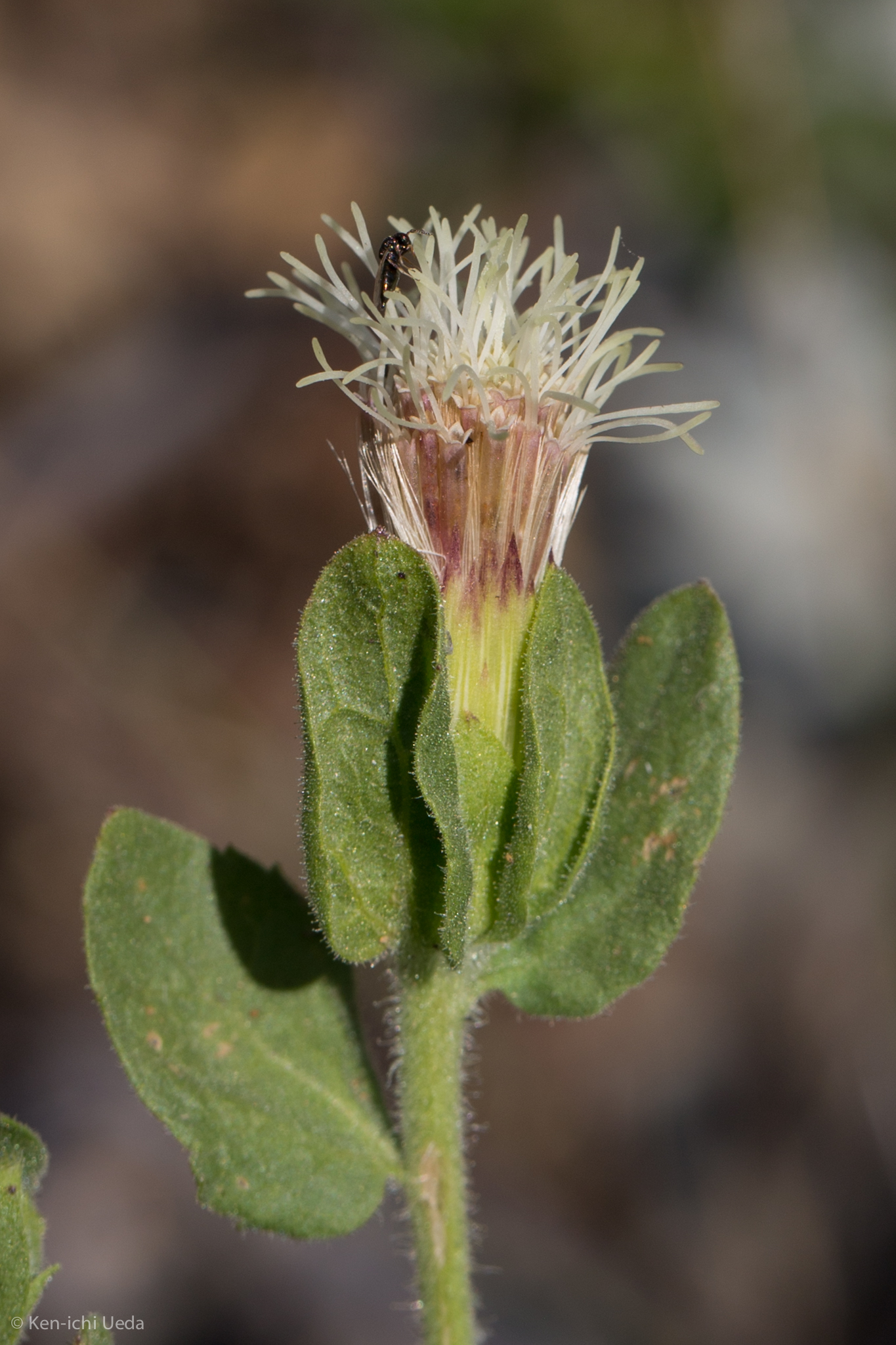

Scientific classification
- Kingdom: Plantae
- Clade: Tracheophytes
- Clade: Angiosperms
- Clade: Eudicots
- Clade: Asterids
- Order: Asterales
- Family: Asteraceae
- Genus: Brickellia
- Species: B. greenei

Binomial name
- Brickellia greenei A.Gray

Synonyms
- Coleosanthus greenei (A.Gray) Kuntze

= Brickellia greenei =

Species of flowering plant

Brickellia greenei is a species of flowering plant in the family Asteraceae known by the common name Greene's brickellbush. It is native to the mountain ranges of southwestern Oregon and northern California, including the Cascades, the northern Coast Ranges, and Sierra Nevada (mostly as north of Alpine County but with a few isolated populations in Inyo and Mariposa Counties).

Brickellia greenei is a perennial herb growing 20 to 50 centimeters (7.9 to 19.7 in) tall with several glandular, sticky stems covered in leaves. The oval, toothed leaves are up to 3 centimeters (1.2 in) long and sticky with resin glands.

The inflorescences hold widely spaced flower heads, each about2 centimeters (0.79 in) long and lined with narrow, pointed phyllaries. Each flower head holds a nearly spherical array of about 60 thready disc florets. The fruit is a hairy cylindrical achene about 7 millimeters (0.28 in) long with a pappus of bristles.

The species is named for American botanist Edward Lee Greene, 1843–1915.
