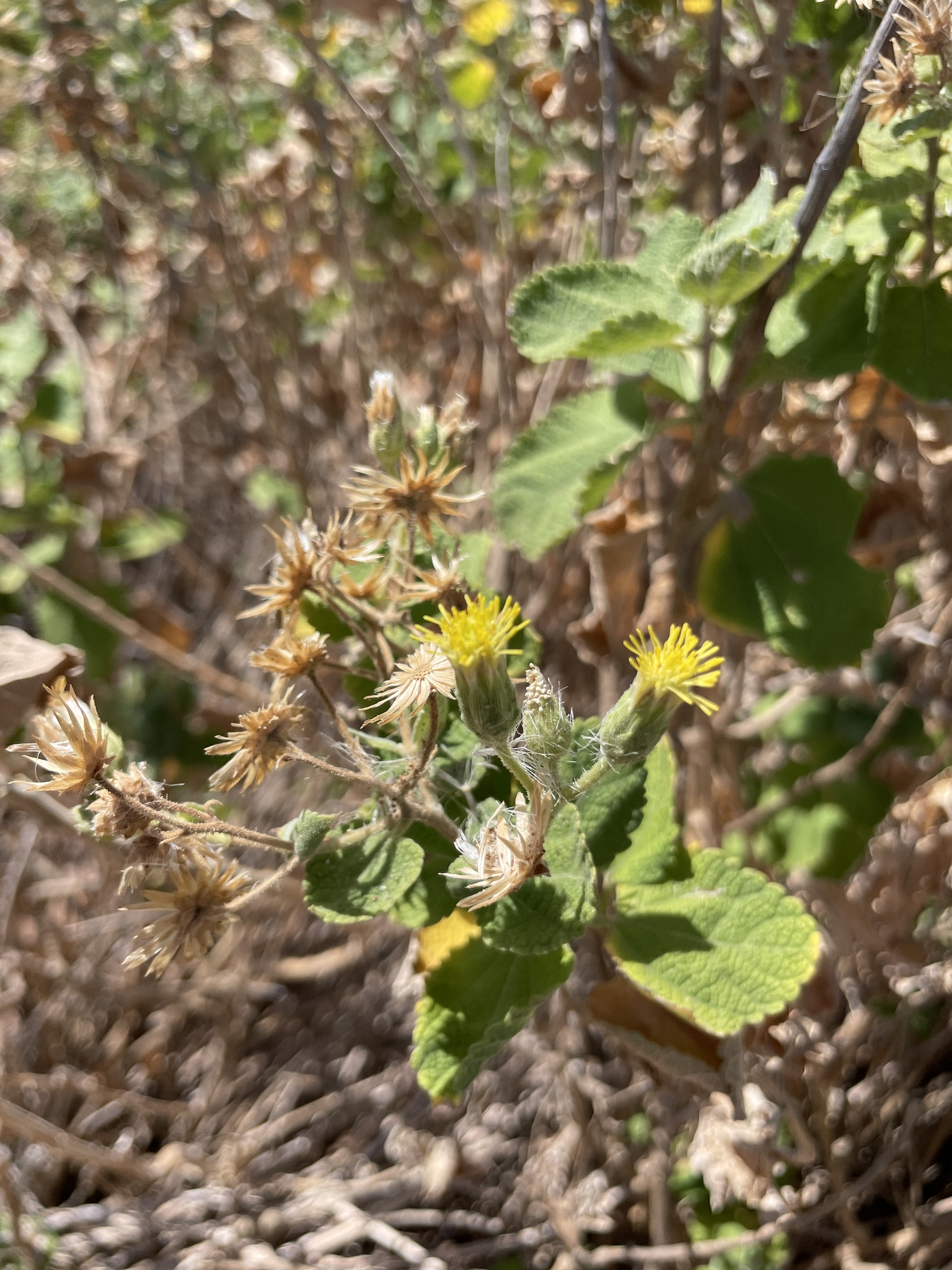

Scientific classification
- Kingdom: Plantae
- Clade: Tracheophytes
- Clade: Angiosperms
- Clade: Eudicots
- Clade: Asterids
- Order: Asterales
- Family: Asteraceae
- Genus: Brickellia
- Species: B. peninsularis

Binomial name
- Brickellia peninsularis Brandegee

Synonyms
- Brickellia peninsularis var. amphithalassa I.M.Johnst.; Brickellia undonis M.E.Jones; Coleosanthus peninsularis (Brandegee) S.F.Blake

= Brickellia peninsularis =

Species of flowering plant

Brickellia peninsularis is a Mexican species of flowering plants in the family Asteraceae. It is native to western Mexico in the states of Baja California, Baja California Sur, and Colima.
