= Brickellia cuspidata =

Scientific classification
- Kingdom: Plantae
- Clade: Embryophytes
- Clade: Tracheophytes
- Clade: Spermatophytes
- Clade: Angiosperms
- Clade: Eudicots
- Clade: Asterids
- Order: Asterales
- Family: Asteraceae
- Genus: Brickellia
- Species: B. cuspidata

Binomial name
- Brickellia cuspidata A.Gray

Species of flowering plant

Brickellia cuspidata is a Mexican species of flowering plants in the family Asteraceae. It is native to western Mexico in the states of Nayarit and Jalisco.
