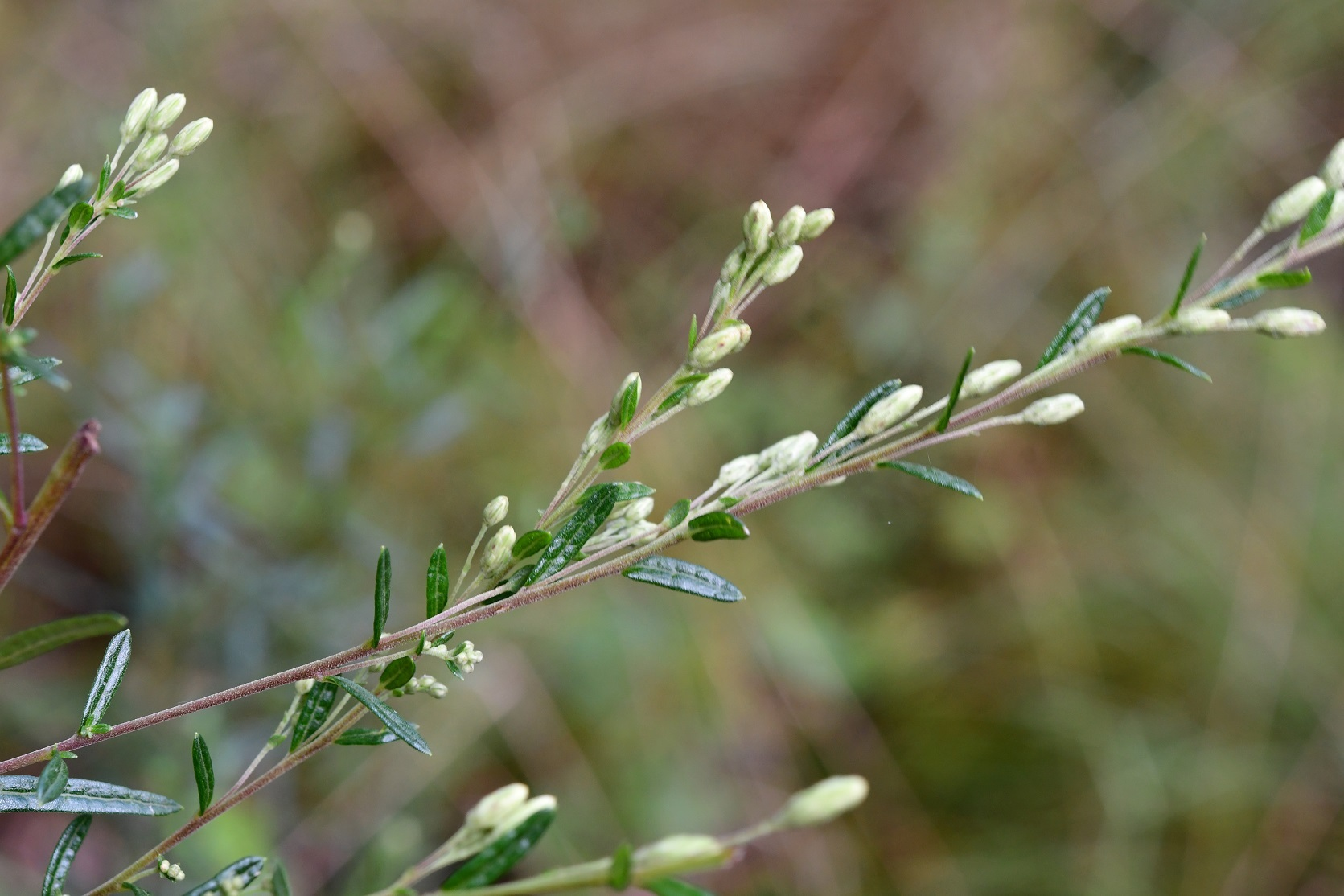

Scientific classification
- Kingdom: Plantae
- Clade: Tracheophytes
- Clade: Angiosperms
- Clade: Eudicots
- Clade: Asterids
- Order: Asterales
- Family: Asteraceae
- Genus: Brickellia
- Species: B. scoparia

Binomial name
- Brickellia scoparia (DC.) A.Gray

Synonyms
- Austroeupatorium rosmarinifolium (Sessé & Moc.) R.M.King & H.Rob.; Clavigera scabra Benth.; Clavigera scoparia DC.; Coleosanthus scoparius (DC.) Kuntze; Eupatorium rosmarinifolium Sessé & Moc. 1887 not Labill. 1806

= Brickellia scoparia =

Species of flowering plant

Brickellia scoparia is a Mesoamerican species of flowering plant in the family Asteraceae. It is native to Guatemala and to Mexico as far north as Nayarit.
