= Brickellia laccata =

Scientific classification
- Kingdom: Plantae
- Clade: Tracheophytes
- Clade: Angiosperms
- Clade: Eudicots
- Clade: Asterids
- Order: Asterales
- Family: Asteraceae
- Genus: Brickellia
- Species: B. laccata

Binomial name
- Brickellia laccata Flyr

Species of flowering plant

Brickellia laccata is a Mexican species of flowering plant in the family Asteraceae. It is native to the state of Coahuila in northern Mexico.

Brickellia laccata is a small, cliff-dwelling shrub up to 25 cm (10 inches) tall. Flower heads are on the ends of short branches, usually one at a time but sometimes 2 or 3. Flowers are straw-colored with darker tips.
