= Brickellia jimenezii =

Scientific classification
- Kingdom: Plantae
- Clade: Tracheophytes
- Clade: Angiosperms
- Clade: Eudicots
- Clade: Asterids
- Order: Asterales
- Family: Asteraceae
- Genus: Brickellia
- Species: B. jimenezii

Binomial name
- Brickellia jimenezii Hinojosa & Cruz Durán

Species of flowering plant

Brickellia jimenezii is a Mexican species of flowering plants in the family Asteraceae. It is native to the State of Guerrero in western Mexico.

Brickellia jimenezii is an annual herb up to 80 cm (32 inches) tall. It produces many small flower heads with cream-colored disc florets but no ray florets. It is found in roadside ravines in tropical deciduous forest.

The species is named for Mexican botanist Jaime Jiménez Ramírez.
