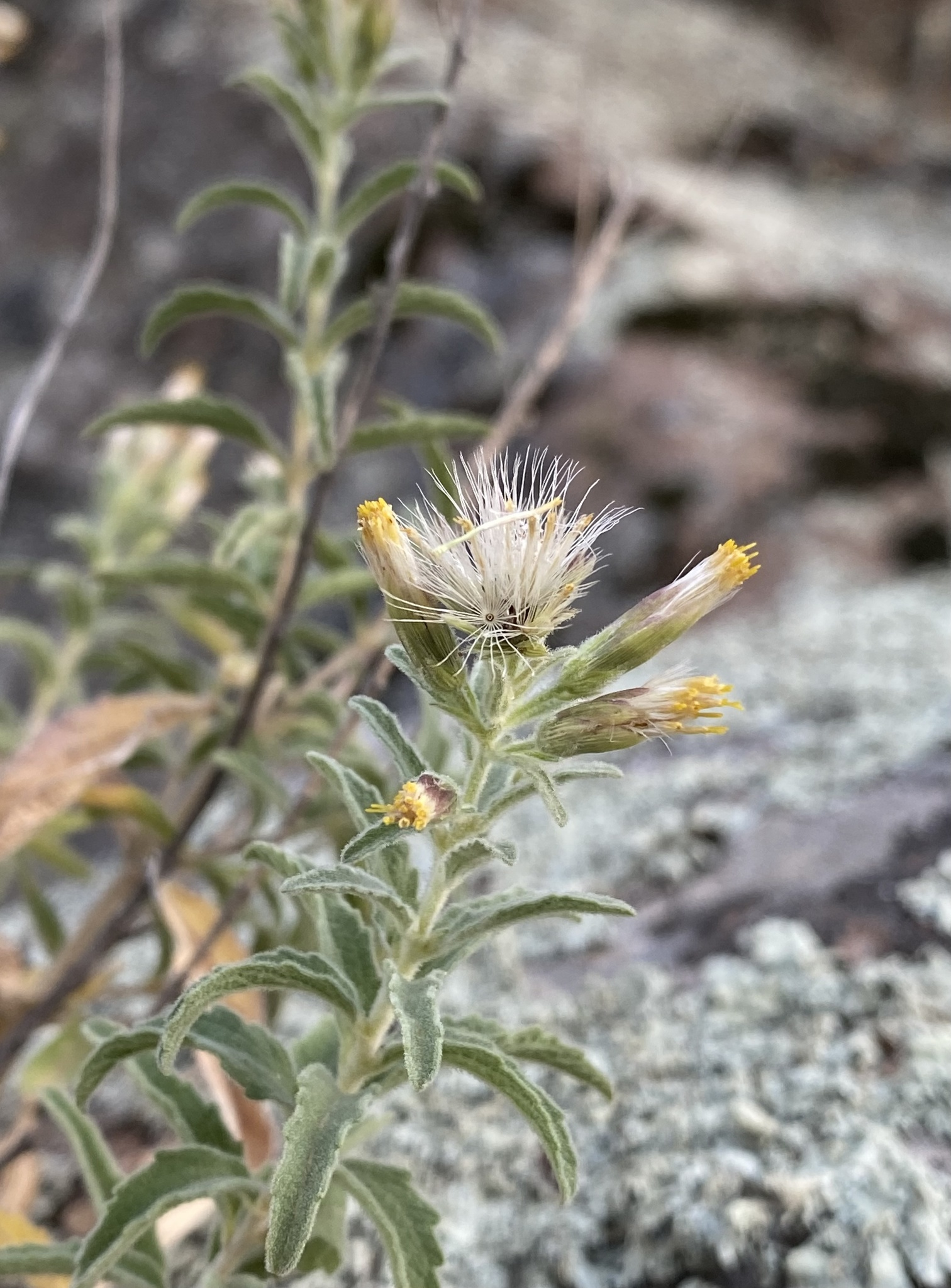

Scientific classification
- Kingdom: Plantae
- Clade: Tracheophytes
- Clade: Angiosperms
- Clade: Eudicots
- Clade: Asterids
- Order: Asterales
- Family: Asteraceae
- Genus: Brickellia
- Species: B. lemmonii

Binomial name
- Brickellia lemmonii A.Gray

Synonyms
- Coleosanthus densus Greene; Coleosanthus lemmonii (A.Gray) Kuntze; Coleosanthus wootonii Greene

= Brickellia lemmonii =

Species of flowering plant

Brickellia lemmonii, or Lemmon's brickellbush, is a North American species of flowering plants in the family Asteraceae. It is native to northeastern and north-central Mexico (Chihuahua, Coahuila) and the southwestern United States (southern New Mexico, southeastern Arizona, western Texas).

== Description ==
Brickellia lemmonii is a shrub up to 50 cm (20 inches) tall. It produces many small flower heads with pale yellow-green disc florets but no ray florets.

The species is named for John Gill Lemmon (1831–1908), husband of American botanist Sara Plummer Lemmon (1836–1923).

Varieties

- Brickellia lemmonii var. conduplicata (B.L.Rob.) B.L.Turner - New Mexico, Texas, Chihuahua, Coahuila
- Brickellia lemmonii var. lemmonii - Arizona, New Mexico, Texas, Chihuahua, Coahuila
