= Brickellia palmeri =

Scientific classification
- Kingdom: Plantae
- Clade: Tracheophytes
- Clade: Angiosperms
- Clade: Eudicots
- Clade: Asterids
- Order: Asterales
- Family: Asteraceae
- Genus: Brickellia
- Species: B. palmeri

Binomial name
- Brickellia palmeri A.Gray

Synonyms
- Coleosanthus palmeri (A.Gray) Kuntze

Species of flowering plant

Brickellia palmeri is a Mexican species of flowering plants in the family Asteraceae. It is native to northern Mexico (Tamaulipas, Nuevo León, San Luis Potosí, Durango, Zacatecas).

The species is named for British botanist Edward Palmer (1829–1911).
