= Brickellia kellermanii =

Scientific classification
- Kingdom: Plantae
- Clade: Tracheophytes
- Clade: Angiosperms
- Clade: Eudicots
- Clade: Asterids
- Order: Asterales
- Family: Asteraceae
- Genus: Brickellia
- Species: B. kellermanii

Binomial name
- Brickellia kellermanii Greenm.

Species of flowering plant

Brickellia kellermanii is a Mesoamerican species of flowering plants in the family Asteraceae. It is native to Central America (Nicaragua, Guatemala, Honduras, Belize) and southern Mexico (Chiapas).

Brickellia kellermanii is a subshrub up to 100 cm (40 inches) tall. It has numerous small flower heads with white or pale purple flowers.

The species is named for US botanist William A. Kellerman, 1850–1908.
