= Brickellia tomentella =

Scientific classification
- Kingdom: Plantae
- Clade: Tracheophytes
- Clade: Angiosperms
- Clade: Eudicots
- Clade: Asterids
- Order: Asterales
- Family: Asteraceae
- Genus: Brickellia
- Species: B. tomentella

Binomial name
- Brickellia tomentella A.Gray

Synonyms
- Coleosanthus tomentellus (A.Gray) Kuntze; Eupatorium tomentosum Sessé & Moc.

Species of flowering plant

Brickellia tomentella is a Mesoamerican species of flowering plants in the family Asteraceae. It is native to Central America (all 6 Spanish-speaking countries) and to southern Mexico (Chiapas and Oaxaca).
