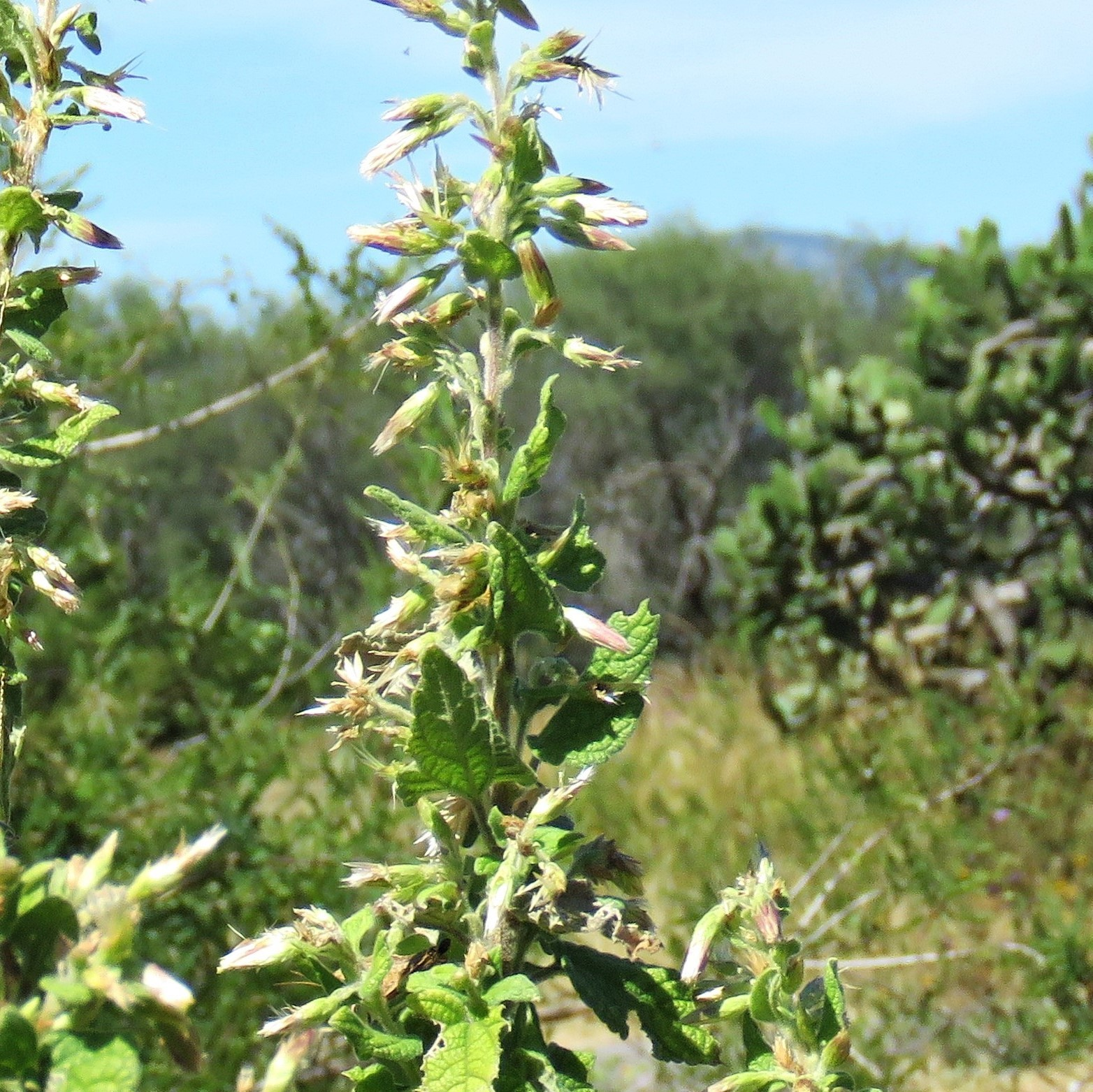

Scientific classification
- Kingdom: Plantae
- Clade: Tracheophytes
- Clade: Angiosperms
- Clade: Eudicots
- Clade: Asterids
- Order: Asterales
- Family: Asteraceae
- Genus: Brickellia
- Species: B. nutanticeps

Binomial name
- Brickellia nutanticeps S.F.Blake

Synonyms
- Eupatorium nutans Kunth (1818); Brickellia nutans (Kunth) B.L.Rob. 1917, illegitimate homonym not B.L.Rob. & Greenm. 1895

= Brickellia nutanticeps =

Species of flowering plant

Brickellia nutanticeps is a Mexican species of flowering plant in the family Asteraceae. It is native to central Mexico (Hidalgo, Veracruz, Puebla, México State, Morelos, Michoacán, Oaxaca).
