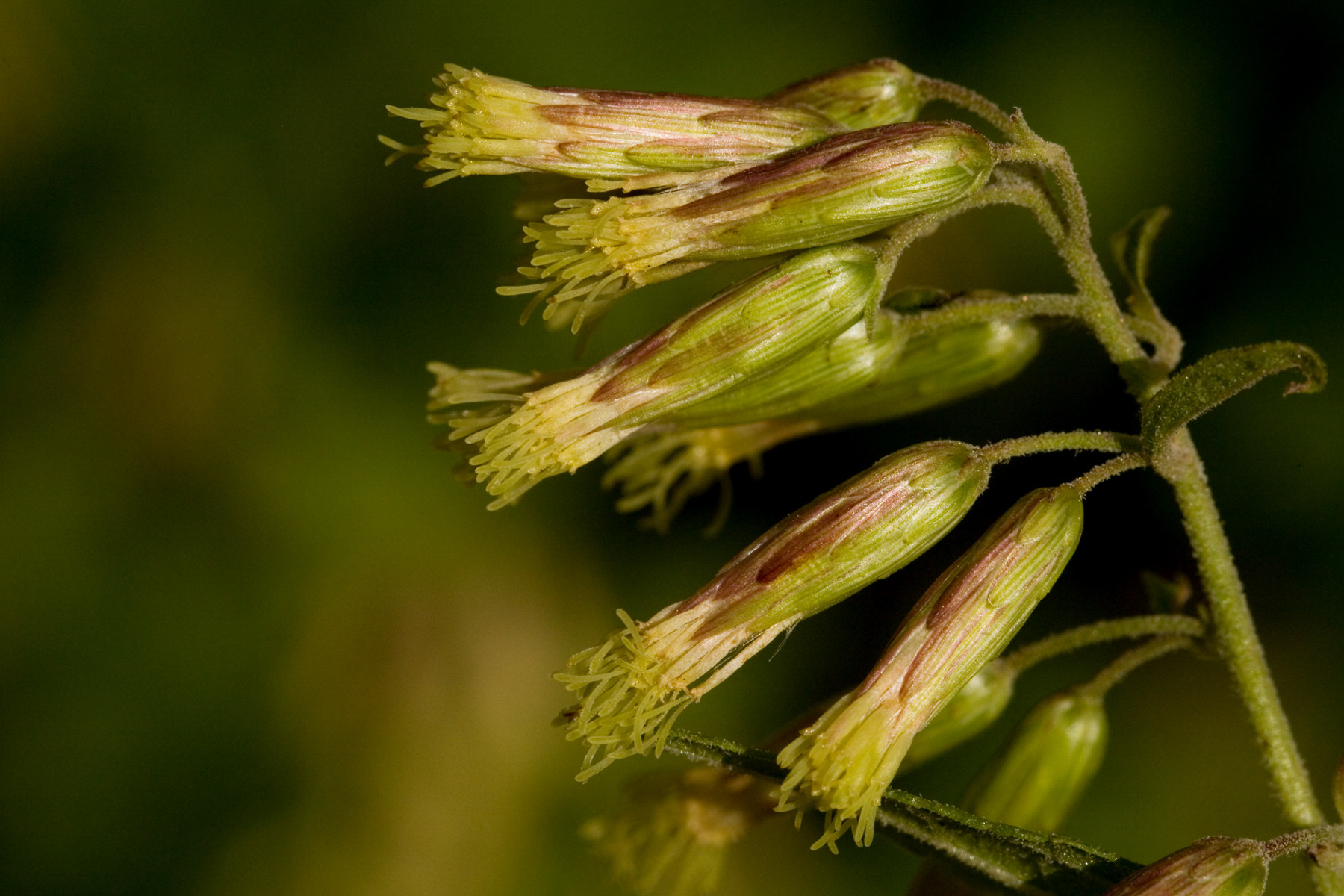

Scientific classification
- Kingdom: Plantae
- Clade: Tracheophytes
- Clade: Angiosperms
- Clade: Eudicots
- Clade: Asterids
- Order: Asterales
- Family: Asteraceae
- Genus: Brickellia
- Species: B. rusbyi

Binomial name
- Brickellia rusbyi A.Gray

Synonyms
- Coleosanthus rusbyi (A.Gray) Kuntze

= Brickellia rusbyi =

Species of flowering plant

Brickellia rusbyi, the stinking brickellbush, is a North American species of flowering plants in the family Asteraceae. It is native to northern Mexico (Chihuahua, Sonora) and the southwestern United States (New Mexico, Arizona).

Brickellia rusbyi is a branching shrub up to 120 cm (36 inches) tall, growing from a woody base. It produces many small flower heads with yellow disc florets but no ray florets.

The species is named for American botanist Henry Hurd Rusby (1855-1940).
