= Brickellia oligadena =

Scientific classification
- Kingdom: Plantae
- Clade: Tracheophytes
- Clade: Angiosperms
- Clade: Eudicots
- Clade: Asterids
- Order: Asterales
- Family: Asteraceae
- Genus: Brickellia
- Species: B. oligadena

Binomial name
- Brickellia oligadena (B.L.Rob.) B.L.Turner

Synonyms
- Brickellia squarrosa var. oligadena B.L.Rob.; Coleosanthus squarrosus var. oligadenus (B.L.Rob.) S.F.Blake

Species of flowering plant

Brickellia oligadena is a Mexican species of flowering plants in the family Asteraceae. It is native to western Mexico, the states of Michoacán, Colima, Guerrero, and Jalisco.

Brickellia oligadena is a shrub sometimes growing up to 3 meters (10 feet) tall.
