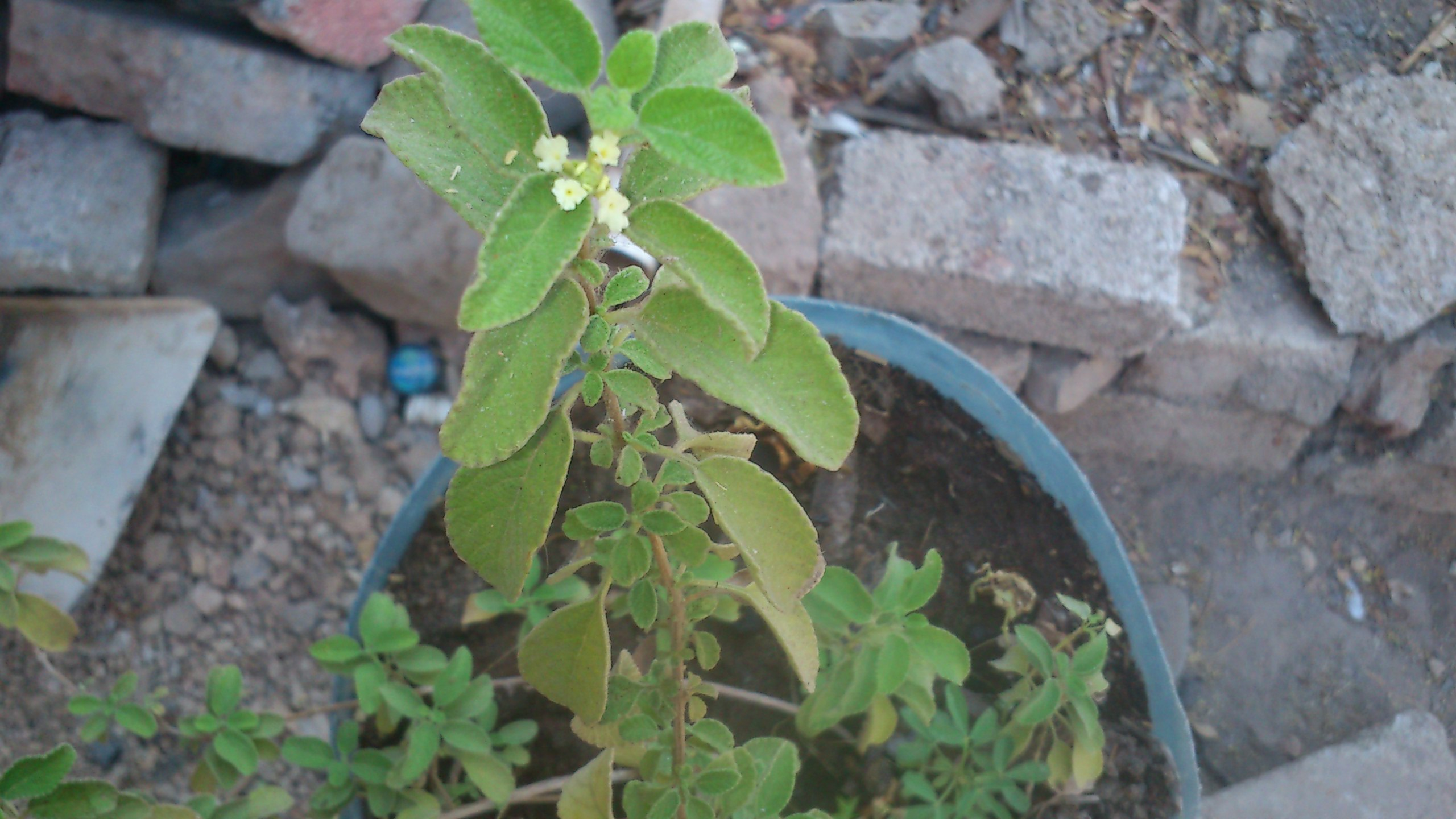

Scientific classification
- Kingdom: Plantae
- Clade: Tracheophytes
- Clade: Angiosperms
- Clade: Eudicots
- Clade: Asterids
- Order: Asterales
- Family: Asteraceae
- Genus: Brickellia
- Species: B. cavanillesii

Binomial name
- Brickellia cavanillesii (Cass.) A.Gray

Synonyms
- Synonymy: Brickellia rosalesia (DC.) Benth. & Hook.f. ex Hemsl.; Brickellia squarrosa (Cav.) B.L.Rob. 1917, illegitimate homonym not B.L.Rob. & Seaton 1893; Brickellia squarrosa B.L.Rob. & Seaton 1893; Bulbostylis cavanillesii (Cass.) DC.; Coleosanthus cavanillesii (A.Gray) Cass.; Coleosanthus squarrosus (Cav.) Kuntze; Eupatorium squarrosum Cav. 1791; Eupatorium squarrosum Sessé & Moc. 1890, illegitimate homonym not Cav. 1791; Rosalesia glandulosa La Llave

= Brickellia cavanillesii =

Species of flowering plant

Brickellia cavanillesii is a Mexican species of flowering plants in the family Asteraceae. It is widespread across much of Mexico from Chiapas north as far as Durango.

The species is named for Spanish botanist Antonio José Cavanilles (1745–1804).
