= Brickellia lancifolia =

Scientific classification
- Kingdom: Plantae
- Clade: Tracheophytes
- Clade: Angiosperms
- Clade: Eudicots
- Clade: Asterids
- Order: Asterales
- Family: Asteraceae
- Genus: Brickellia
- Species: B. lancifolia

Binomial name
- Brickellia lancifolia B.L.Rob. & Greenm.

Synonyms
- Coleosanthus lancifolius (B.L.Rob. & Greenm.) S.F.Blake

Species of flowering plant

Brickellia lancifolia is a species of flowering plants in the family Asteraceae. It is native to southern Mexico in the state of Oaxaca.

Brickellia lancifolia is a branching shrub up to 240 cm (approximately 8 feet) tall. Its leaves partially surround the stems. The plant produces many small, nodding (hanging) flower heads with purple disc florets but no ray florets.
