= Brickellia vernicosa =

Scientific classification
- Kingdom: Plantae
- Clade: Tracheophytes
- Clade: Angiosperms
- Clade: Eudicots
- Clade: Asterids
- Order: Asterales
- Family: Asteraceae
- Genus: Brickellia
- Species: B. vernicosa

Binomial name
- Brickellia vernicosa B.L.Rob.

Synonyms
- Coleosanthus vernicosus (B.L.Rob.) S.F.Blake

Species of flowering plant

Brickellia vernicosa is a Mexican species of flowering plants in the family Asteraceae. It is native to north-central Mexico, in the states of Durango, Zacatecas, and Chihuahua.

Brickellia vernicosa is a shrub with striped bark and violet flower heads.
