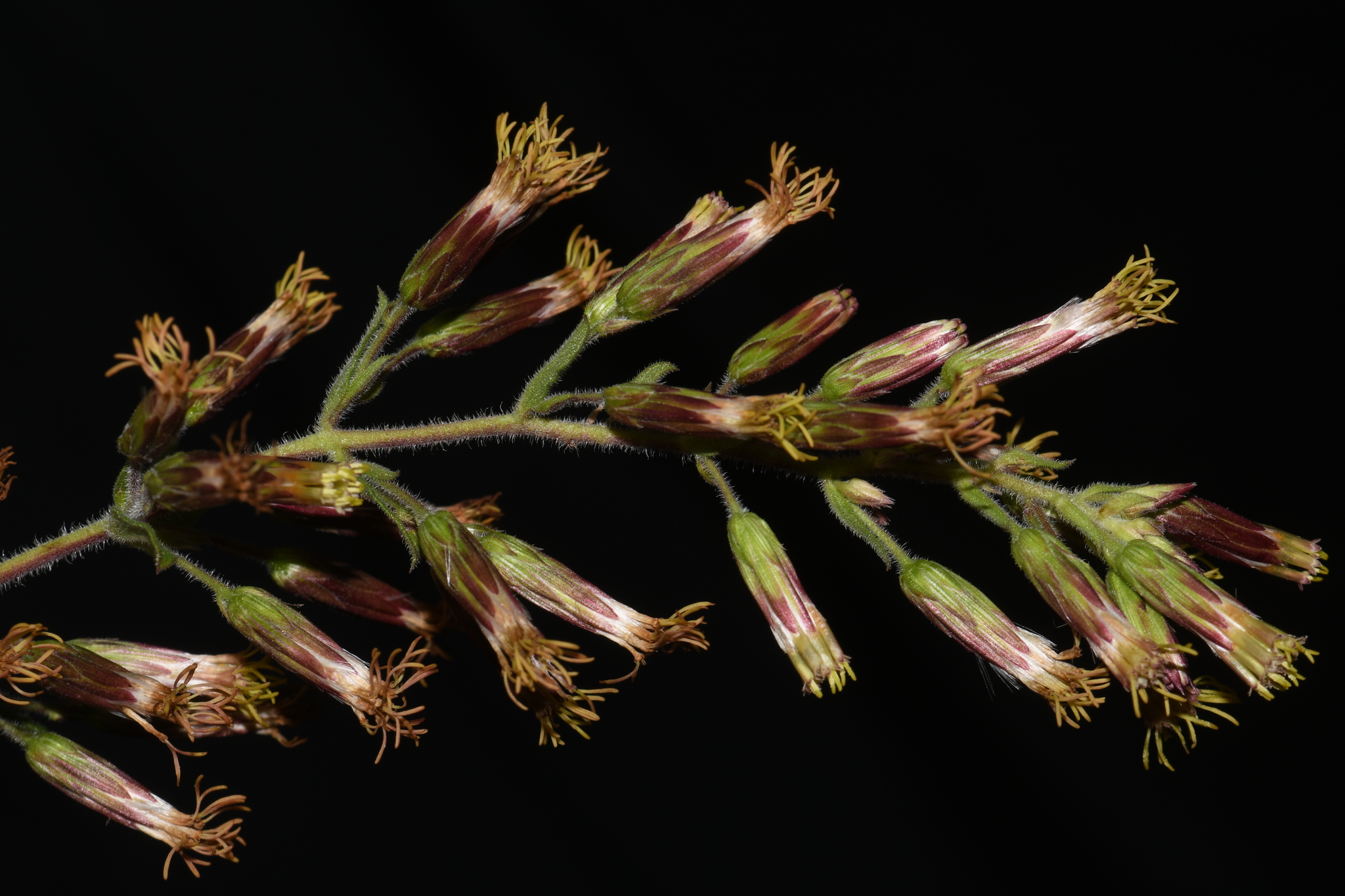

Scientific classification
- Kingdom: Plantae
- Clade: Tracheophytes
- Clade: Angiosperms
- Clade: Eudicots
- Clade: Asterids
- Order: Asterales
- Family: Asteraceae
- Genus: Brickellia
- Species: B. betonicifolia

Binomial name
- Brickellia betonicifolia A.Gray

Synonyms
- Coleosanthus betonicifolius (A. Gray) Kuntze; Coleosanthus betonicaefolius (A. Gray) Kuntze; Brickellia betonicaefolia A.Gray

= Brickellia betonicifolia =

Species of flowering plant

Brickellia betonicifolia, the betonyleaf brickellbush, is a Mexican species of flowering plants in the family Asteraceae. It is native to northwestern Mexico, in the States of Baja California, Sonora, Chihuahua, and Durango and the southwestern United States (New Mexico and Arizona).

Brickellia betonicifolia is a branching shrub up to 90 cm (36 inches) tall. The plant produces several small flower heads with purple disc florets but no ray florets.
