= Brickellia worthingtonii =

Scientific classification
- Kingdom: Plantae
- Clade: Tracheophytes
- Clade: Angiosperms
- Clade: Eudicots
- Clade: Asterids
- Order: Asterales
- Family: Asteraceae
- Genus: Brickellia
- Species: B. worthingtonii

Binomial name
- Brickellia worthingtonii B.L.Turner

Species of flowering plant

Brickellia worthingtonii is a North American species of flowering plants in the family Asteraceae. It is native to northern Mexico in the state of Durango.

Brickellia worthingtonii is a subshrub up to 60 cm (24 inches) tall. It has numerous small, nodding (hanging) flower heads.

The species is named for US botanist Richard D. Worthington.
