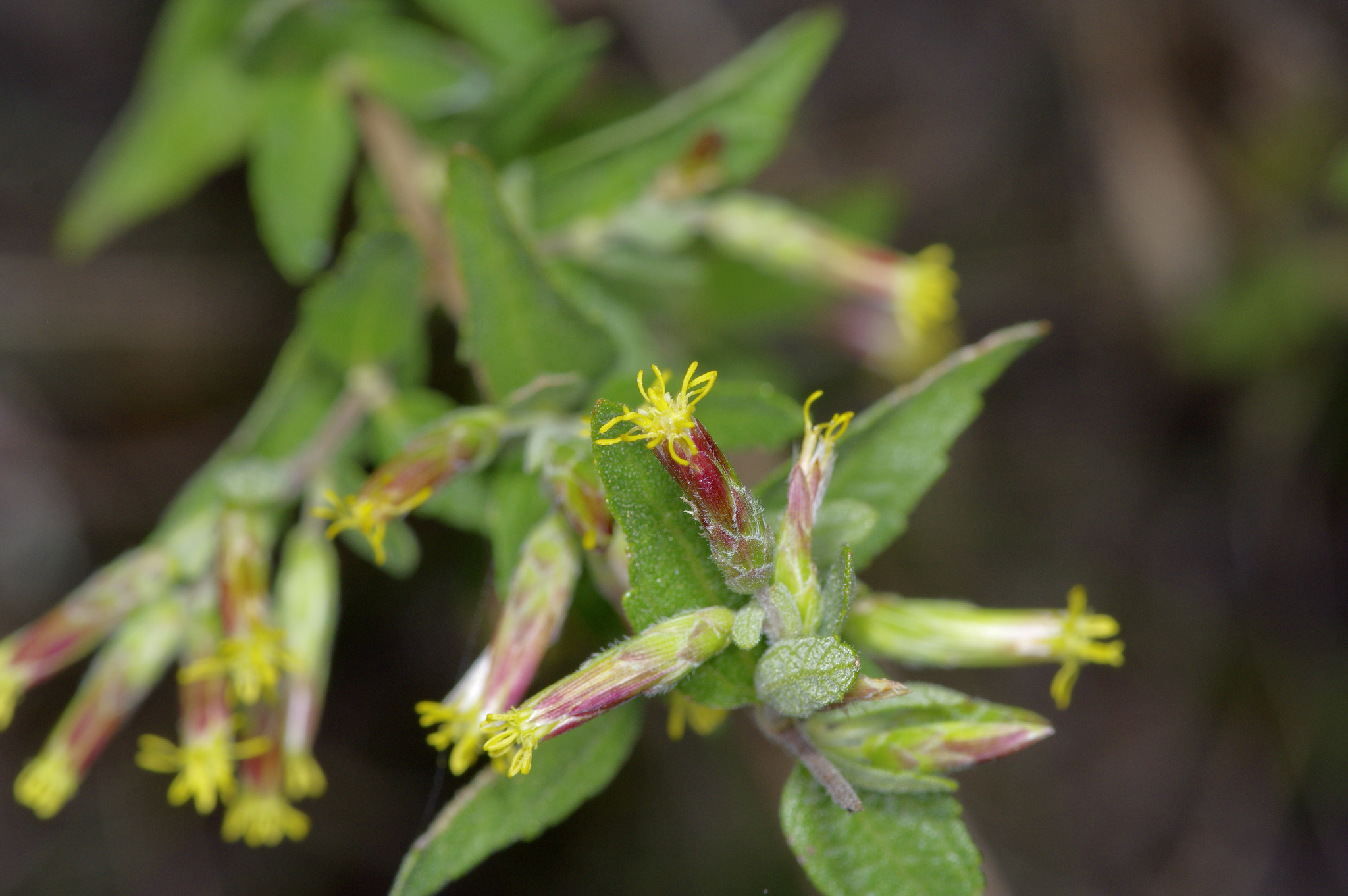

Scientific classification
- Kingdom: Plantae
- Clade: Tracheophytes
- Clade: Angiosperms
- Clade: Eudicots
- Clade: Asterids
- Order: Asterales
- Family: Asteraceae
- Genus: Brickellia
- Species: B. cylindracea

Binomial name
- Brickellia cylindracea A.Gray ex A.Gray & Engelm.

Synonyms
- Coleosanthus cylindraceus (A.Gray & Engelm.) Kuntze

= Brickellia cylindracea =

Species of flowering plant

Brickellia cylindracea, the gravelbar brickellbush, is a North American species of flowering plants in the family Asteraceae. It is found only in central Texas.

Brickellia cylindracea is a perennial up to 120 cm (4 feet) tall, growing from a woody caudex. It produces many small flower heads with greenish, yellow, or yellow-orange disc florets but no ray florets.
