= Brickellia conduplicata =

Scientific classification
- Kingdom: Plantae
- Clade: Tracheophytes
- Clade: Angiosperms
- Clade: Eudicots
- Clade: Asterids
- Order: Asterales
- Family: Asteraceae
- Genus: Brickellia
- Species: B. conduplicata

Binomial name
- Brickellia conduplicata (B.L.Rob.) B.L.Rob.

Synonyms
- Brickellia betonicifolia var. conduplicata B.L.Rob; Brickellia lemmonii var. conduplicata (B.L.Rob.) B.L.Turner

Species of flowering plant

Brickellia conduplicata, the southwestern brickellbush, is a species of flowering plant in the family Asteraceae. It is native to northeastern Mexico in the states of Tamaulipas and San Luis Potosí.
