= Brickellia knappiana =

Conservation status
- Imperiled (NatureServe)

Scientific classification
- Kingdom: Plantae
- Clade: Tracheophytes
- Clade: Angiosperms
- Clade: Eudicots
- Clade: Asterids
- Order: Asterales
- Family: Asteraceae
- Genus: Brickellia
- Species: B. knappiana

Binomial name
- Brickellia knappiana Drew

Synonyms
- Coleosanthus knappianus (Drew) Greene

Species of flowering plant

Brickellia knappiana, or Knapp brickellbush, is a North American species of flowering plants in the family Asteraceae. It grows in desert mountain ranges in southern California (Inyo, San Bernardino, and San Diego Counties) and southern Nevada (Nye and Clark Counties).

Brickellia knappiana is a shrub up to 200 cm (80 inches) tall. It produces many small flower heads with white disc florets but no ray florets.
