= Brickellia aramberrana =

Scientific classification
- Kingdom: Plantae
- Clade: Tracheophytes
- Clade: Angiosperms
- Clade: Eudicots
- Clade: Asterids
- Order: Asterales
- Family: Asteraceae
- Genus: Brickellia
- Species: B. aramberrana

Binomial name
- Brickellia aramberrana B.L.Turner

Species of flowering plant

Brickellia aramberrana is a Mexican species of flowering plants in the family Asteraceae. It is native to northeastern Mexico.

Brickellia aramberrana is a branching shrub up to 150 cm (60 inches) tall. The plant produces several small flower heads with yellow disc florets but no ray florets.

The species is named for the community of Aramberri, near where the species was initially discovered.
