= Brickellia glomerata =

Scientific classification
- Kingdom: Plantae
- Clade: Tracheophytes
- Clade: Angiosperms
- Clade: Eudicots
- Clade: Asterids
- Order: Asterales
- Family: Asteraceae
- Genus: Brickellia
- Species: B. glomerata

Binomial name
- Brickellia glomerata Fernald

Synonyms
- Coleosanthus glomeratus (Fernald) S.F.Blake

Species of flowering plant

Brickellia glomerata is a Mexican species of flowering plants in the family Asteraceae. It is found in central and southwestern Mexico, in the states of México, Morelos, Guerrero, and Oaxaca.

Brickellia glomerata produces several flower heads with disc florets but no ray florets. The heads are clumped together in groups called "glomerules," hence the scientific name of the species.
