= Brickellia odontophylla =

Scientific classification
- Kingdom: Plantae
- Clade: Tracheophytes
- Clade: Angiosperms
- Clade: Eudicots
- Clade: Asterids
- Order: Asterales
- Family: Asteraceae
- Genus: Brickellia
- Species: B. odontophylla

Binomial name
- Brickellia odontophylla A.Gray

Species of flowering plant

Brickellia odontophylla is a Mexican species of flowering plants in the family Asteraceae. It is native to northern Mexico, in the states of Chihuahua, Coahuila, Nuevo León, Durango, and Zacatecas.
