= Brickellia parryi =

Scientific classification
- Kingdom: Plantae
- Clade: Tracheophytes
- Clade: Angiosperms
- Clade: Eudicots
- Clade: Asterids
- Order: Asterales
- Family: Asteraceae
- Genus: Brickellia
- Species: B. parryi

Binomial name
- Brickellia parryi A.Gray

Synonyms
- Coleosanthus parryi (A.Gray) Kuntze; Brickellia secundiflora var. parryi (A. Gray) B.L. Turner

Species of flowering plant

Brickellia parryi is a Mexican species of flowering plants in the family Asteraceae. It is native to northeastern Mexico in the state of San Luis Potosí.
