= Brickellia magnifica =

Scientific classification
- Kingdom: Plantae
- Clade: Tracheophytes
- Clade: Angiosperms
- Clade: Eudicots
- Clade: Asterids
- Order: Asterales
- Family: Asteraceae
- Genus: Brickellia
- Species: B. magnifica

Binomial name
- Brickellia magnifica McVaugh

Species of plant

Brickellia magnifica is a Mexican species of flowering plants in the family Asteraceae. It is native to western Mexico in the states of Nayarit and Jalisco.

Brickellia magnifica is a branching shrub up to 250 cm (100 inches) tall. The plant produces several small flower heads with yellow or purple disc florets but no ray florets.
