= Brickellia arguta =

Scientific classification
- Kingdom: Plantae
- Clade: Tracheophytes
- Clade: Angiosperms
- Clade: Eudicots
- Clade: Asterids
- Order: Asterales
- Family: Asteraceae
- Genus: Brickellia
- Species: B. arguta

Binomial name
- Brickellia arguta B.L.Rob.

Synonyms
- Brickellia atractyloides var. arguta (B.L. Rob.) Jeps.; Coleosanthus argutus (B.L. Rob.) S.F. Blake

Species of flowering plant

Brickellia arguta is a North American species of flowering plant in the family Asteraceae known by the common name pungent brickellbush. It is native to the Mojave and Sonoran Deserts of California, Nevada, Arizona, and Baja California.

Brickellia arguta is a thickly branching shrub growing angled, glandular stems 2–4 meters (6.6–13.1 ft) in height. The rough, leathery leaves are oval in shape and up to 2 centimeters (8/10 inch) long. They are often sticky with resin glands. The inflorescences at the end of stem branches contain solitary flower heads, each about 1.5 centimeters long and lined with green, pointed phyllaries. At the tip of the head are 40 to 55 white, pinkish, or yellowish tubular disc florets. The fruit is a hairy cylindrical achene 4 millimeters long with a pappus of bristles.
