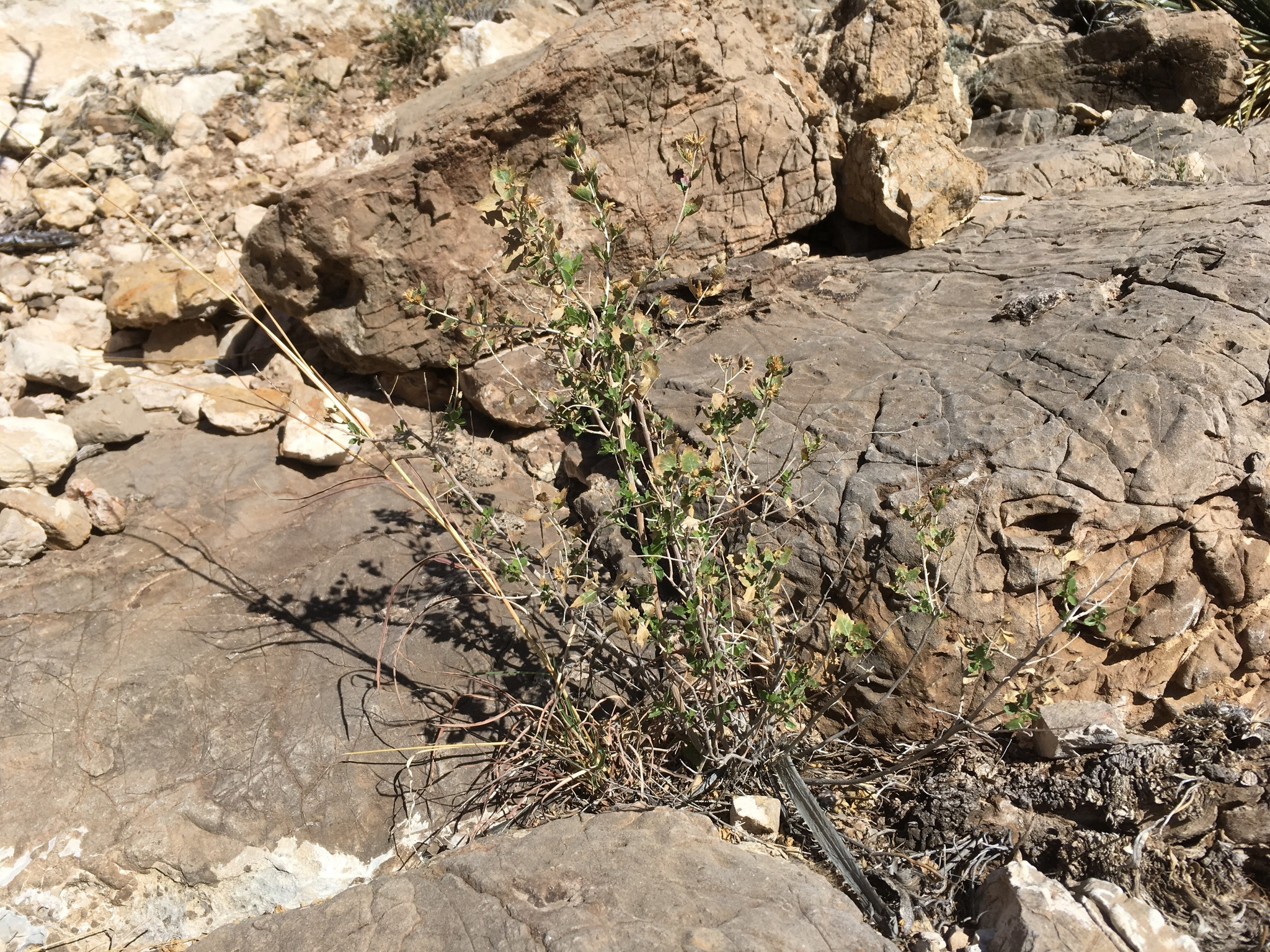

Scientific classification
- Kingdom: Plantae
- Clade: Tracheophytes
- Clade: Angiosperms
- Clade: Eudicots
- Clade: Asterids
- Order: Asterales
- Family: Asteraceae
- Genus: Brickellia
- Species: B. baccharidea

Binomial name
- Brickellia baccharidea A.Gray

Synonyms
- Coleosanthus baccharideus (A.Gray) Kuntze

= Brickellia baccharidea =

Species of flowering plant

Brickellia baccharidea, the resinleaf brickellbush, is a North American species of shrubs in the family Asteraceae. It is native to the southwestern United States (Arizona, southern New Mexico, and western Texas) and northwestern Mexico (northern Sonora, western Chihuahua).

Brickellia baccharidea is a branching shrub up to 150 cm (60 inches) tall. It produces numerous cream-colored flower heads grouped into tight panicles.
