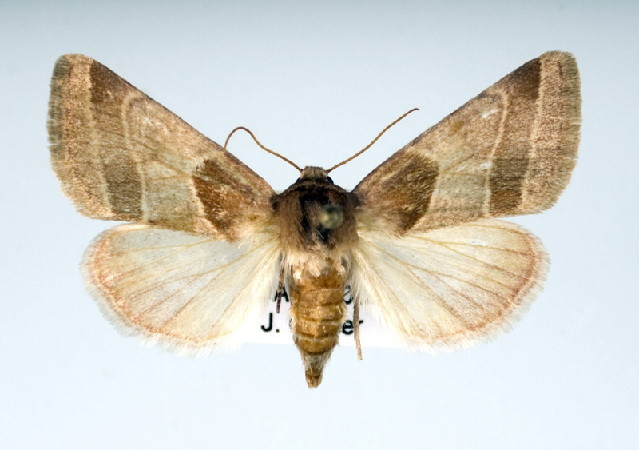

Scientific classification
- Kingdom: Animalia
- Phylum: Arthropoda
- Clade: Pancrustacea
- Class: Insecta
- Order: Lepidoptera
- Superfamily: Noctuoidea
- Family: Noctuidae
- Genus: Schinia
- Species: S. oleagina

Binomial name
- Schinia oleagina Morrison, 1875

Synonyms
- Schinia sara Smith, 1907; Schinia baueri McElvare, 1951; Schinia ernesta Smith, 1907

= Schinia oleagina =

Species of moth

Schinia oleagina is a moth of the family Noctuidae. It is found in most of the western half of North America.

The wingspan is about 27 mm.

The larvae feed on Brickellia.
