= Brickellia extranea =

Scientific classification
- Kingdom: Plantae
- Clade: Tracheophytes
- Clade: Angiosperms
- Clade: Eudicots
- Clade: Asterids
- Order: Asterales
- Family: Asteraceae
- Genus: Brickellia
- Species: B. extranea

Binomial name
- Brickellia extranea McVaugh

Species of flowering plant

Brickellia extranea is a Mexican species of flowering plants in the family Asteraceae. It is native to western Mexico in the state of Jalisco.
