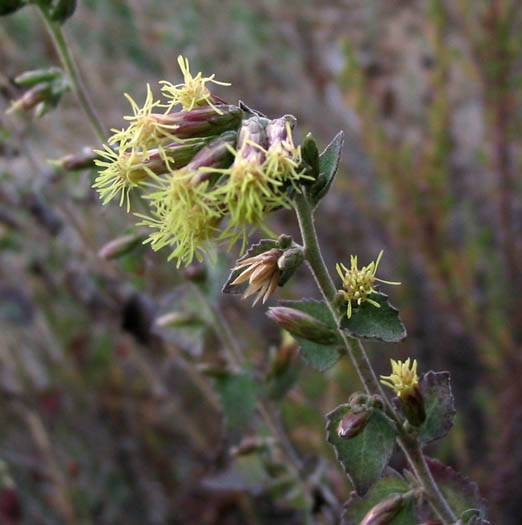
- Brickellia californica

Scientific classification
- Kingdom: Plantae
- Clade: Embryophytes
- Clade: Tracheophytes
- Clade: Spermatophytes
- Clade: Angiosperms
- Clade: Eudicots
- Clade: Asterids
- Order: Asterales
- Family: Asteraceae
- Subfamily: Asteroideae
- Tribe: Eupatorieae
- Genus: Brickellia; Elliott 1823, conserved name not Raf. 1808 (Polemoniaceae)

Species
- About 100-110, see text

= Brickellia =

Genus of flowering plants

Brickellia is a North American genus of about 100 to 110 species of plants in the family Asteraceae, known commonly as brickellbushes. They are found in Canada, the United States, Mexico, and Central America. Many species are native to the American southwest, especially Texas. Brickellia is among the more basal lineages of the Eupatorieae and should not be assigned to a subtribe pending further research.

They are mostly woody perennial shrubs. Some species have a very strong pleasant scent, while others smell distasteful. All contain high amounts of essential oils. Germacrene D, a natural insecticide, is found in B. veronicifolia and probably other species, if not all.

Despite their chemical defenses, brickellbushes are food for caterpillars of certain Lepidoptera. These include the noctuid moths Schinia trifascia, Schinia oleagina, which is known only from Brickellia, Schinia buta, which is only known from B. californica, and Schinia gracilenta, which is only known from B. eupatorioides.

The genus is named for John Brickell, 1748–1809, Irish-born physician and naturalist.

== Classification ==
The genera Brickelliastrum (United States and Mexico), Asanthus (United States and Mexico), Dyscritogyne (Mexico), and Steviopsis have been separated from Brickellia by many 20th century authors (and all four combined into Steviopsis by some). Their correct placement is still debated, but molecular phylogenetic analysis has provided evidence that Brickelliastrum, Asanthus, and Steviopsis (including Dyscritogyne, which is not distinct from Steviopsis) represent distinct lineages, and should be recognized as separate from Brickellia, while [Kuhnia], [Barroetea] and [Phanerostylis] should be treated as synonyms.

Species

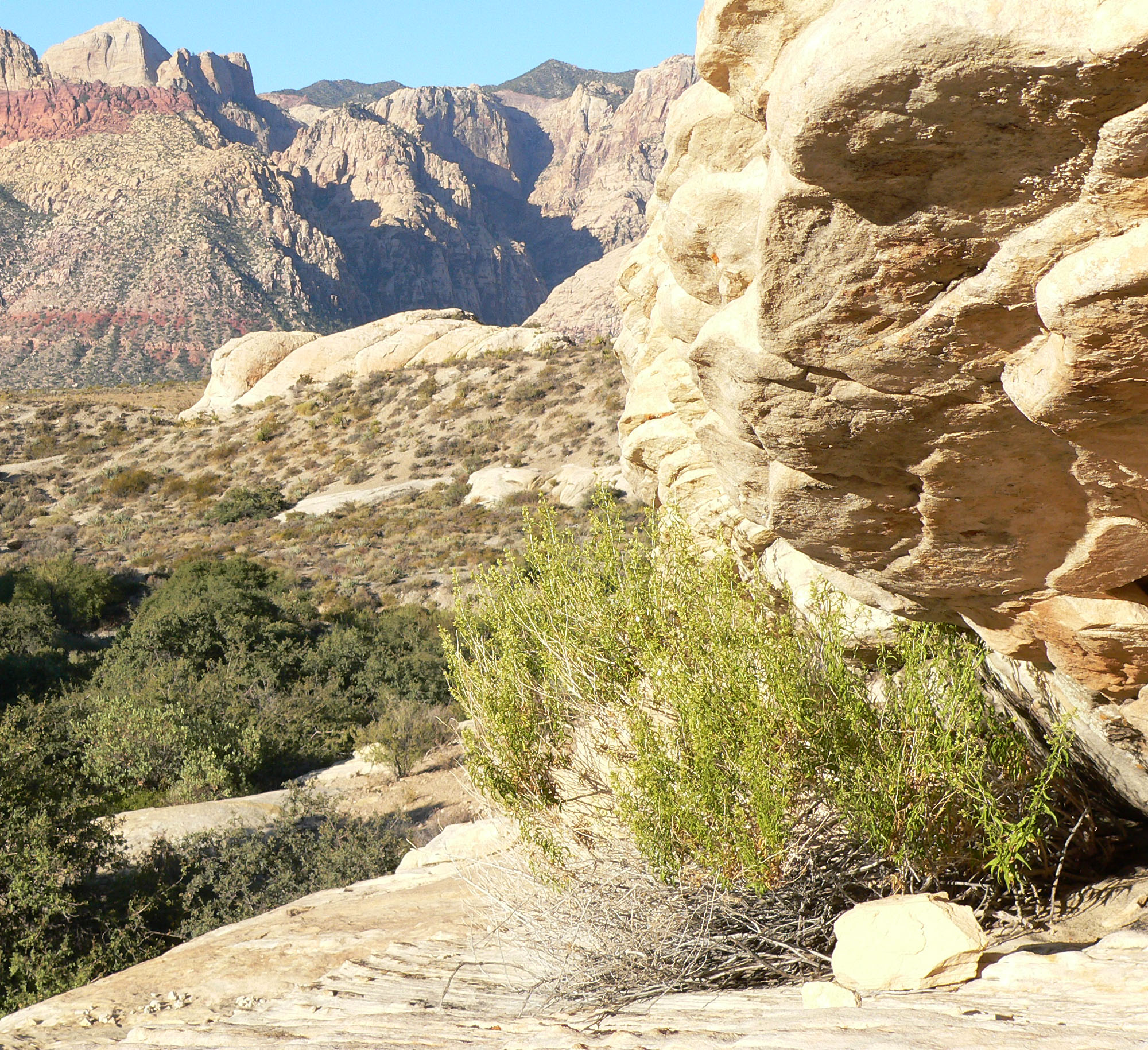
Brickellia longifolia in Nevada

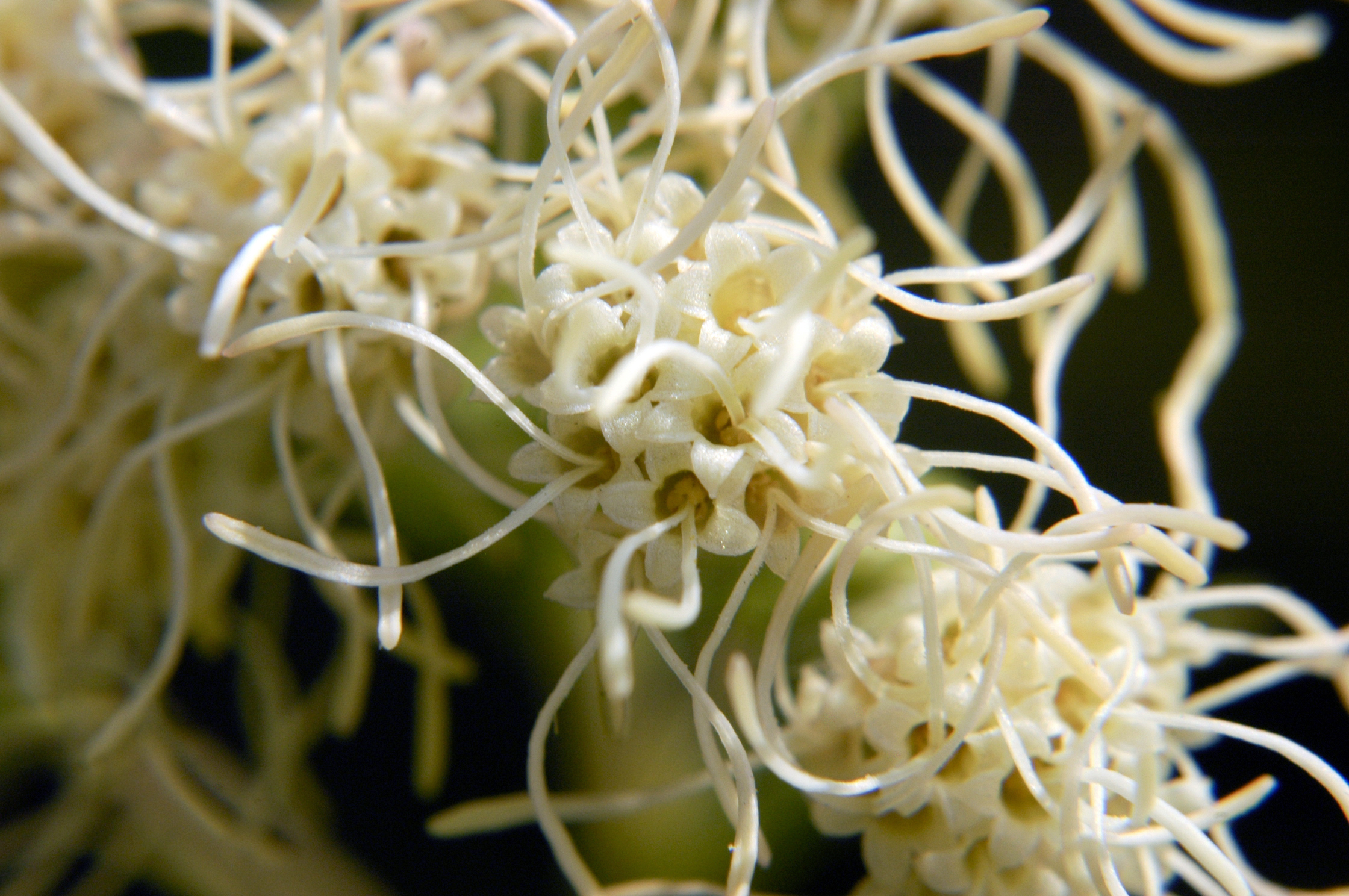
Brickellia eupatorioides

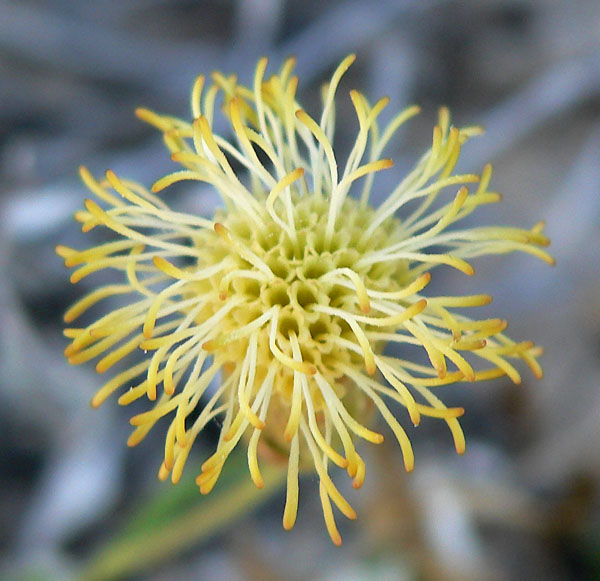
Brickellia atractyloides

- Brickellia adenolepis
- Brickellia ambigens
- Brickellia amplexicaulis – earleaf brickellbush
- Brickellia aramberrana
- Brickellia arguta – pungent brickellbush
- Brickellia argyrolepis
- Brickellia atractyloides – spearleaf brickellbush, hollyleaf brickellbush
- Brickellia baccharidea – resinleaf brickellbush, baccharisleaf brickellbush
- Brickellia betonicifolia – betonyleaf brickellbush
- Brickellia botterii
- Brickellia brachyphylla – plumed brickellbush
- Brickellia brandegei
- Brickellia californica – California brickellbush, Jepson's brickellbush
- Brickellia cardiophylla
- Brickellia cavanillesii
- Brickellia chenopodina
- Brickellia chlorolepis
- Brickellia coixtlahuaca
- Brickellia conduplicata
- Brickellia cordifolia – Flyr's nemesis
- Brickellia corymbosa
- Brickellia coulteri
- Brickellia cuspidata
- Brickellia cylindracea – gravelbar brickellbush
- Brickellia dentata – leafy brickellbush
- Brickellia desertorum
- Brickellia diffusa
- Brickellia eupatorioides – false boneset
- Brickellia extranea
- Brickellia filipes
- Brickellia floribunda – Chihuahuan brickellbush
- Brickellia frutescens – shrubby brickellbush, rigid brickellbush
- Brickellia gentryi
- Brickellia glabrata
- Brickellia glandulosa
- Brickellia glomerata
- Brickellia glutinosa
- Brickellia grandiflora – tassel-flowered brickellbush, mountain brickellbush
- Brickellia greenei
- Brickellia hastata
- Brickellia hebecarpa
- Brickellia hinckleyi
- Brickellia huahuapana
- Brickellia hymenochlaena
- Brickellia incana – woolly brickellbush, white brickellbush
- Brickellia jaliscensis
- Brickellia jimenezii
- Brickellia kellermanii
- Brickellia knappiana
- Brickellia laccata
- Brickellia laciniata – splitleaf brickellbush
- Brickellia lanata
- Brickellia lancifolia
- Brickellia laxiflora
- Brickellia lemmonii
- Brickellia leonensis
- Brickellia leptophylla
- Brickellia lewisii
- Brickellia longifolia
- Brickellia macromera
- Brickellia magnifica
- Brickellia mcdonaldii
- Brickellia megaphylla
- Brickellia microphylla
- Brickellia monocephala
- Brickellia mosieri
- Brickellia multiflora
- Brickellia nelsonii
- Brickellia nevinii
- Brickellia nutanticeps
- Brickellia oblongifolia – Mojave brickellbush, narrow-leaved brickellbush
- Brickellia odontophylla
- Brickellia oligadena
- Brickellia oliganthes
- Brickellia oreithales
- Brickellia orizabaensis
- Brickellia palmeri
- Brickellia paniculata
- Brickellia parryi
- Brickellia parvula – Mt. Davis brickellbush, small brickellbush
- Brickellia paucidentata
- Brickellia pavonii
- Brickellia pendula
- Brickellia pedunculosa
- Brickellia peninsularis
- Brickellia pringlei
- Brickellia problematica
- Brickellia reticulata
- Brickellia rhomboidea
- Brickellia robinsoniana
- Brickellia rusbyi – stinking brickellbush
- Brickellia scabra
- Brickellia schaffneri
- Brickellia scoparia
- Brickellia secundiflora
- Brickellia seemannii
- Brickellia simplex – Sonoran brickellbush
- Brickellia sonorana
- Brickellia spinulosa
- Brickellia stolonifera
- Brickellia subsessilis
- Brickellia subuligera
- Brickellia tomentella
- Brickellia urolepis
- Brickellia venosa
- Brickellia verbenacea
- Brickellia vernicosa
- Brickellia veronicifolia
- Brickellia viejensis
- Brickellia villarealii
- Brickellia vollmeri
- Brickellia watsonii
- Brickellia wendtii
- Brickellia wislizeni
- Brickellia worthingtonii
