= Brickellia hebecarpa =

Scientific classification
- Kingdom: Plantae
- Clade: Tracheophytes
- Clade: Angiosperms
- Clade: Eudicots
- Clade: Asterids
- Order: Asterales
- Family: Asteraceae
- Genus: Brickellia
- Species: B. hebecarpa

Binomial name
- Brickellia hebecarpa (DC.) A.Gray

Synonyms
- Brickellia colimae Rose; Bulbostylis hebecarpa DC.; Coleosanthus hebecarpus (DC.) Kuntze

Species of flowering plant

Brickellia hebecarpa is a Mexican species of flowering plants in the family Asteraceae. It is native to western Mexico, the states of Colima, Michoacán, and Jalisco.

Brickellia hebecarpa is a branching shrub up to 150 cm (5 feet) tall with purple flower heads borne on short side branches.
