= Brickellia nelsonii =

Scientific classification
- Kingdom: Plantae
- Clade: Tracheophytes
- Clade: Angiosperms
- Clade: Eudicots
- Clade: Asterids
- Order: Asterales
- Family: Asteraceae
- Genus: Brickellia
- Species: B. nelsonii

Binomial name
- Brickellia nelsonii B.L.Rob.

Synonyms
- Brickellia lemmonii var. nelsonii (B.L. Rob.) B.L. Turner; Coleosanthus nelsonii (B.L. Rob.) S.F. Blake

Species of flowering plant

Brickellia nelsonii, or Nelson's brickellbush, is a Mexican species of flowering plants in the family Asteraceae. It is native to northeastern Mexico in the states of Tamaulipas, Coahuila, San Luis Potosí, and Nuevo León.

Brickellia nelsonii is an herb up to 100 cm (40 inches) tall, sometimes a bit woody near the base.
