= Brickellia corymbosa =

Scientific classification
- Kingdom: Plantae
- Clade: Tracheophytes
- Clade: Angiosperms
- Clade: Eudicots
- Clade: Asterids
- Order: Asterales
- Family: Asteraceae
- Genus: Brickellia
- Species: B. corymbosa

Binomial name
- Brickellia corymbosa (DC.) A.Gray

Synonyms
- Clavigera corymbosa DC.; Coleosanthus corymbosus (DC.) Kuntze

Species of flowering plant

Brickellia corymbosa is a Mexican species of flowering plants in the family Asteraceae. It is found in central and western Mexico, in the states of Jalisco, Michoacán, Puebla, and Oaxaca.
