= Brickellia wendtii =

Scientific classification
- Kingdom: Plantae
- Clade: Tracheophytes
- Clade: Angiosperms
- Clade: Eudicots
- Clade: Asterids
- Order: Asterales
- Family: Asteraceae
- Genus: Brickellia
- Species: B. wendtii

Binomial name
- Brickellia wendtii B.L.Turner

Species of flowering plant

Brickellia wendtii is a North American species of flowering plants in the family Asteraceae. It is native to northern Mexico in the state of Coahuila.

Brickellia wendtii is a subshrub up to 100 cm (39 inches) tall. It has numerous small flower heads with cream-colored or pale green flowers.

The species is named for US botanist Thomas Leighton Wendt (1950-).
