= Brickellia filipes =

Scientific classification
- Kingdom: Plantae
- Clade: Tracheophytes
- Clade: Angiosperms
- Clade: Eudicots
- Clade: Asterids
- Order: Asterales
- Family: Asteraceae
- Genus: Brickellia
- Species: B. filipes

Binomial name
- Brickellia filipes B.L.Rob.

Species of flowering plant

Brickellia filipes is a Mexican species of flowering plants in the family Asteraceae. It is native to western Mexico, the states of Oaxaca, Guerrero, Michoacán, Colima, and Jalisco.
