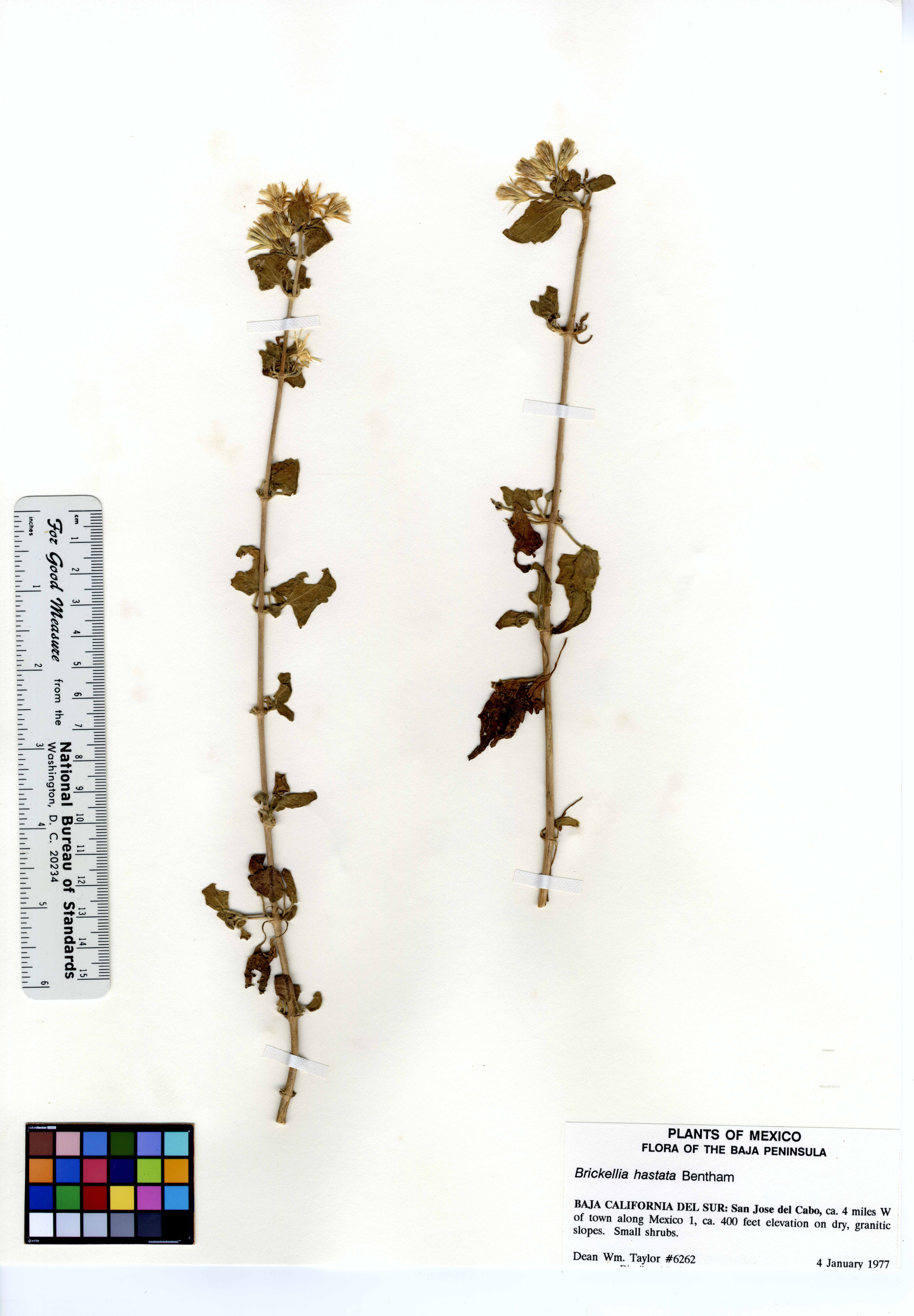
- Photo of herbarium specimen collected in Baja California Sur

Scientific classification
- Kingdom: Plantae
- Clade: Embryophytes
- Clade: Tracheophytes
- Clade: Spermatophytes
- Clade: Angiosperms
- Clade: Eudicots
- Clade: Asterids
- Order: Asterales
- Family: Asteraceae
- Genus: Brickellia
- Species: B. hastata

Binomial name
- Brickellia hastata Benth.

Synonyms
- Bulbostylis hastata (Benth.) Walp.; Coleosanthus hastatus (Benth.) Kuntze

= Brickellia hastata =

Species of flowering plant

Brickellia hastata is a North American species of shrubs in the family, Asteraceae. It is found only in the state of Baja California Sur in western Mexico.
