= Brickellia brandegei =

Scientific classification
- Kingdom: Plantae
- Clade: Tracheophytes
- Clade: Angiosperms
- Clade: Eudicots
- Clade: Asterids
- Order: Asterales
- Family: Asteraceae
- Genus: Brickellia
- Species: B. brandegei

Binomial name
- Brickellia brandegei B.L.Rob.

Synonyms
- Coleosanthus brandegei (B.L.Rob.) S.F.Blake

Species of flowering plant

Brickellia brandegei is a Mexican species of flowering plants in the family Asteraceae. It is native to western Mexico from the states of Sonora and Baja California Sur (including Isla Espíritu Santo).
