= Brickellia macromera =

Scientific classification
- Kingdom: Plantae
- Clade: Tracheophytes
- Clade: Angiosperms
- Clade: Eudicots
- Clade: Asterids
- Order: Asterales
- Family: Asteraceae
- Genus: Brickellia
- Species: B. macromera

Binomial name
- Brickellia macromera B.L.Rob.

Synonyms
- Coleosanthus macromerus (B.L.Rob.) S.F.Blake

Species of flowering plant

Brickellia macromera is a rare Mexican species of flowering plants in the family Asteraceae. It is found only in the state of Baja California Sur in western Mexico.

Brickellia macromera is a branching shrub with white bark on the limbs and trunk. It produces several flower heads with disc florets but no ray florets.
