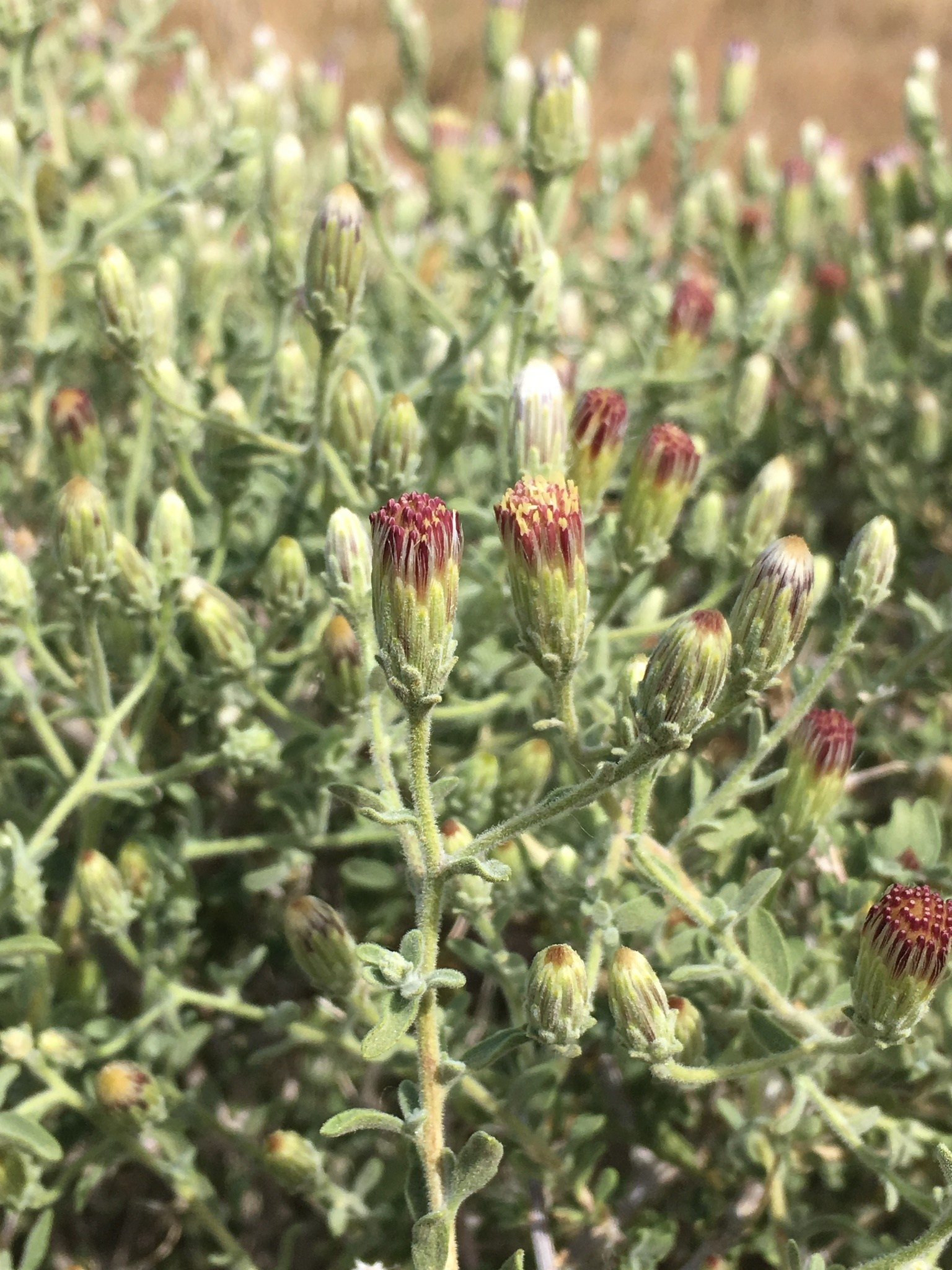

Scientific classification
- Kingdom: Plantae
- Clade: Tracheophytes
- Clade: Angiosperms
- Clade: Eudicots
- Clade: Asterids
- Order: Asterales
- Family: Asteraceae
- Genus: Brickellia
- Species: B. frutescens

Binomial name
- Brickellia frutescens A.Gray

Synonyms
- Coleosanthus fructescens (A.Gray) Kuntze

= Brickellia frutescens =

Species of flowering plant

Brickellia frutescens, the shrubby brickellbush, is a North American species of flowering plant in the family Asteraceae. It is native to desert regions of Arizona, southern Nevada, southern California, and Baja California.

Brickellia frutescens is a shrub up to 60 cm (2 feet) tall. It is highly branched, with many small purple flower heads.
