= Brickellia paucidentata =

Scientific classification
- Kingdom: Plantae
- Clade: Tracheophytes
- Clade: Angiosperms
- Clade: Eudicots
- Clade: Asterids
- Order: Asterales
- Family: Asteraceae
- Genus: Brickellia
- Species: B. paucidentata

Binomial name
- Brickellia paucidentata Klatt

Species of flowering plant

Brickellia paucidentata is a South American species of flowering plants in the family Asteraceae. It is native to Santa Cruz Department in eastern Bolivia.
