= Brickellia mcdonaldii =

Scientific classification
- Kingdom: Plantae
- Clade: Tracheophytes
- Clade: Angiosperms
- Clade: Eudicots
- Clade: Asterids
- Order: Asterales
- Family: Asteraceae
- Genus: Brickellia
- Species: B. mcdonaldii

Binomial name
- Brickellia mcdonaldii B.L.Turner

Species of flowering plant

Brickellia mcdonaldii is a Mexican species of flowering plants in the family Asteraceae. It is native to northeastern Mexico in the state of Tamaulipas.

Brickellia mcdonaldii is a perennial herb up to 50 cm (20 inches) tall. The plant flower heads in groups of 5–8, with purplish disc florets but no ray florets.

The species is named for American botanist Andrew McDonald.
