= Brickellia problematica =

Scientific classification
- Kingdom: Plantae
- Clade: Tracheophytes
- Clade: Angiosperms
- Clade: Eudicots
- Clade: Asterids
- Order: Asterales
- Family: Asteraceae
- Genus: Brickellia
- Species: B. problematica

Binomial name
- Brickellia problematica B.L.Turner

Synonyms
- Barroetea glutinosa Brandegee 1908, not Brickellia glutinosa A. Gray 1886; Phanerostylis glutinosa (Brandegee) R.M. King & H. Rob.

Species of flowering plant

Brickellia problematica is a |Mexican species of flowering plants in the family Asteraceae. It is native to western Mexico in the states of Puebla and Oaxaca.
