= Brickellia urolepis =

Scientific classification
- Kingdom: Plantae
- Clade: Tracheophytes
- Clade: Angiosperms
- Clade: Eudicots
- Clade: Asterids
- Order: Asterales
- Family: Asteraceae
- Genus: Brickellia
- Species: B. urolepis

Binomial name
- Brickellia urolepis Wiggins

Species of flowering plant

Brickellia urolepis is a Mexican species of flowering plants in the family Asteraceae. It is native to northeastern Mexico in the states of Coahuila and Nuevo León.
