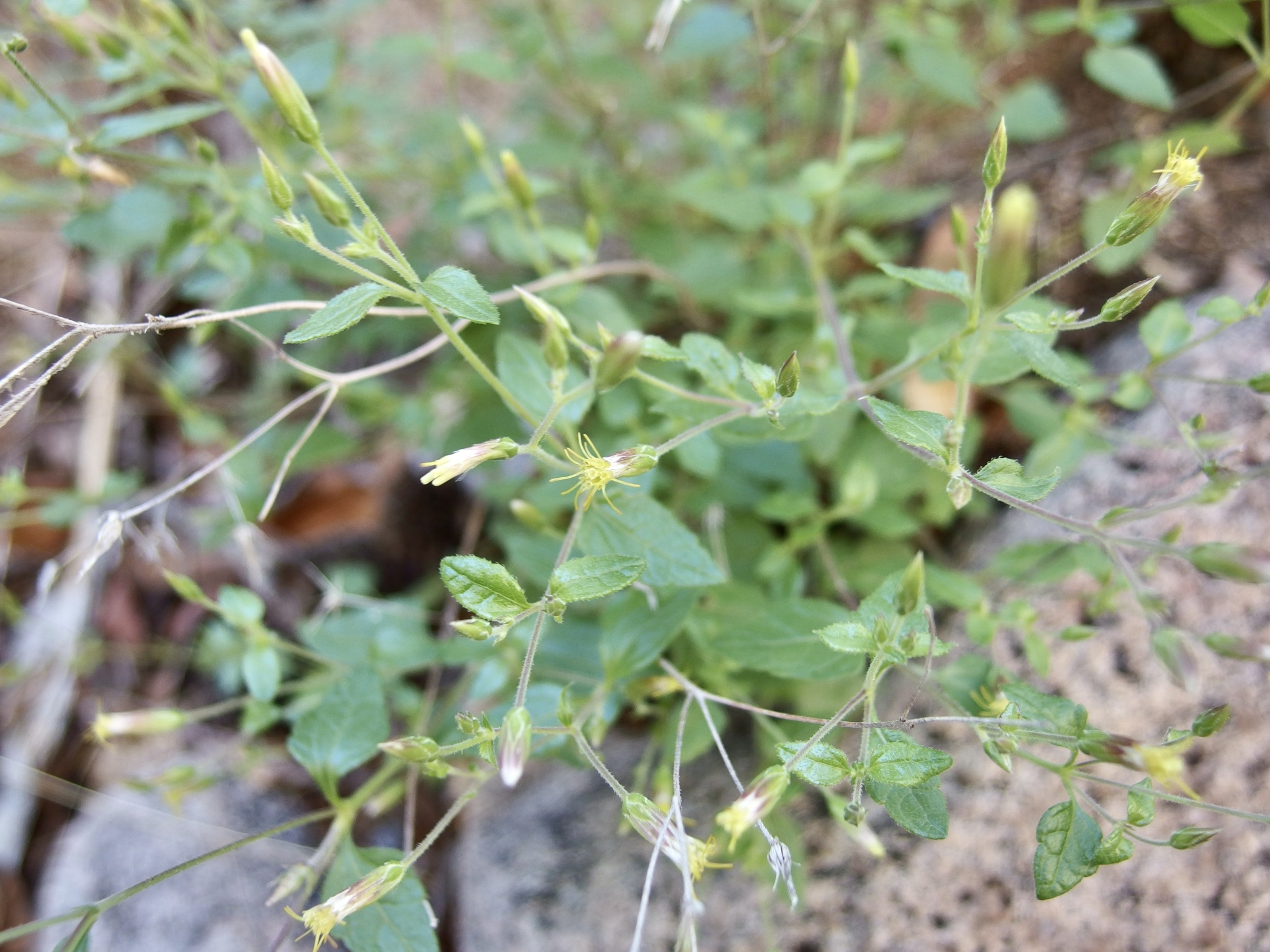

Scientific classification
- Kingdom: Plantae
- Clade: Tracheophytes
- Clade: Angiosperms
- Clade: Eudicots
- Clade: Asterids
- Order: Asterales
- Family: Asteraceae
- Genus: Brickellia
- Species: B. parvula

Binomial name
- Brickellia parvula A.Gray

Synonyms
- Coleosanthus parvulus (A.Gray) Kuntze

= Brickellia parvula =

Species of flowering plant

Brickellia parvula, the Mt. Davis brickellbush, is a North American species of flowering plants in the family Asteraceae. It is native to northeastern and north-central Mexico (Chihuahua) and the southwestern United States (southern New Mexico, southern Arizona, western Texas).

Brickellia parvula is a shrub up to 30 cm (12 inches) tall, growing from a woody caudex. It produces many small flower heads with yellow or green disc florets but no ray florets.
