= Brickellia argyrolepis =

Scientific classification
- Kingdom: Plantae
- Clade: Tracheophytes
- Clade: Angiosperms
- Clade: Eudicots
- Clade: Asterids
- Order: Asterales
- Family: Asteraceae
- Genus: Brickellia
- Species: B. argyrolepis

Binomial name
- Brickellia argyrolepis B.L.Rob.

Synonyms
- Brickellia adenocarpa B.L.Rob.; Brickellia guatemalensis B.L.Rob.; Coleosanthus adenocarpus (B.L.Rob.) Arthur

Species of flowering plant

Brickellia argyrolepis is a Mesoamerican species of flowering plants in the family Asteraceae. It is native to Central America (all six Spanish-speaking countries) and to southern Mexico (Chiapas and Oaxaca).
