= Brickellia huahuapana =

Scientific classification
- Kingdom: Plantae
- Clade: Tracheophytes
- Clade: Angiosperms
- Clade: Eudicots
- Clade: Asterids
- Order: Asterales
- Family: Asteraceae
- Genus: Brickellia
- Species: B. huahuapana

Binomial name
- Brickellia huahuapana B.L.Turner

Species of flowering plant

Brickellia huahuapana is a Mexican species of flowering plants in the family Asteraceae. It is native to the state of Oaxaca in southern Mexico.
