= Brickellia orizabaensis =

Scientific classification
- Kingdom: Plantae
- Clade: Tracheophytes
- Clade: Angiosperms
- Clade: Eudicots
- Clade: Asterids
- Order: Asterales
- Family: Asteraceae
- Genus: Brickellia
- Species: B. orizabaensis

Binomial name
- Brickellia orizabaensis Klatt

Synonyms
- Brickellia adenocarpa var. glandulipes B.L.Rob.; Brickellia nutans B.L. Rob. & Greenm.; Coleosanthus orizabaensis (Klatt) S.F.Blake

Species of flowering plant

Brickellia orizabaensis is a Mexican species of flowering plants in the family Asteraceae. It is native to Mexico the states of Veracruz and Oaxaca.

The species is named for the City of Orizaba in Veracruz.
