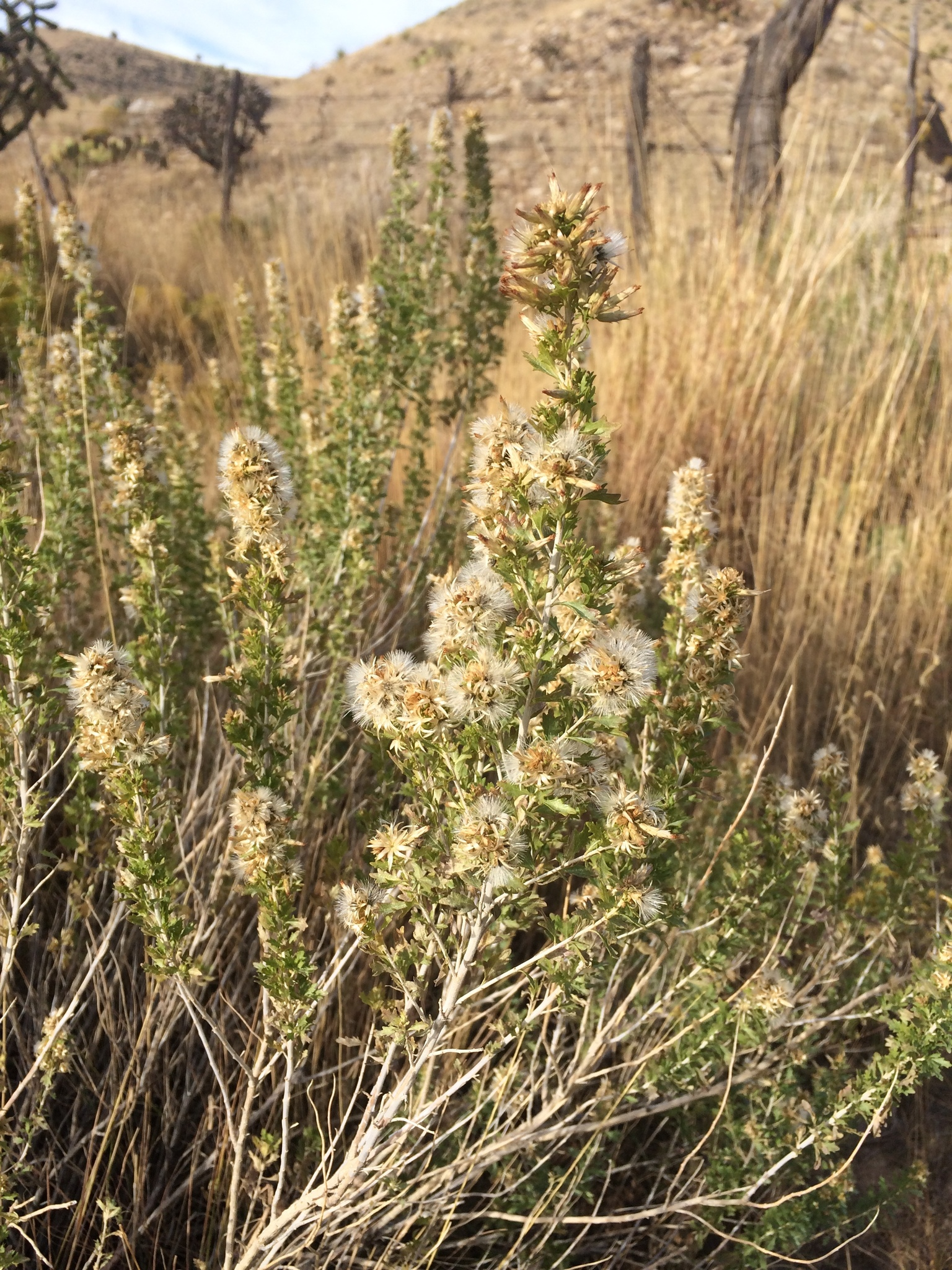

Scientific classification
- Kingdom: Plantae
- Clade: Tracheophytes
- Clade: Angiosperms
- Clade: Eudicots
- Clade: Asterids
- Order: Asterales
- Family: Asteraceae
- Genus: Brickellia
- Species: B. laciniata

Binomial name
- Brickellia laciniata A.Gray

Synonyms
- Coleosanthus laciniatus (A.Gray) Kuntze

= Brickellia laciniata =

Species of flowering plant

Brickellia laciniata, the splitleaf brickellbush, is a North American species of flowering plants in the family Asteraceae. It is native to northeastern and north-central Mexico (Chihuahua, Coahuila, Nuevo León, Durango, San Luis Potosí, Tamaulipas, Zacatecas) and the southwestern United States (southern New Mexico, western Texas).

Brickellia laciniata is a shrub up to 120 cm (48 inches) tall. It produces many small flower heads with yellow-green disc florets but no ray florets.
