= Brickellia reticulata =

Scientific classification
- Kingdom: Plantae
- Clade: Tracheophytes
- Clade: Angiosperms
- Clade: Eudicots
- Clade: Asterids
- Order: Asterales
- Family: Asteraceae
- Genus: Brickellia
- Species: B. reticulata

Binomial name
- Brickellia reticulata (DC.) A.Gray

Synonyms
- Bulbostylis reticulata DC.; Coleosanthus reticulatus (DC.) Kuntze

Species of flowering plant

Brickellia reticulata is a Mexican species of flowering plants in the family Asteraceae. It is native to the state of México in the central part of the republic of Mexico near the city of Temascaltepec.
