= Brickellia megaphylla =

Scientific classification
- Kingdom: Plantae
- Clade: Tracheophytes
- Clade: Angiosperms
- Clade: Eudicots
- Clade: Asterids
- Order: Asterales
- Family: Asteraceae
- Genus: Brickellia
- Species: B. megaphylla

Binomial name
- Brickellia megaphylla M.E.Jones 1933

Synonyms
- Brickellia megaphylla M.E.Jones ex B.L.Rob. 1945, isonym (duplication) of M.E.Jones 1933

Species of flowering plant

Brickellia megaphylla is a Mexican species of flowering plants in the family of Asteraceae. It is native to the state of Baja California Sur in western Mexico, near the community of Loreto.

Brickellia megaphylla is a shrub that can grow up to 240 cm (8 feet) tall. It produces numerous flower heads in flat-topped arrays.
