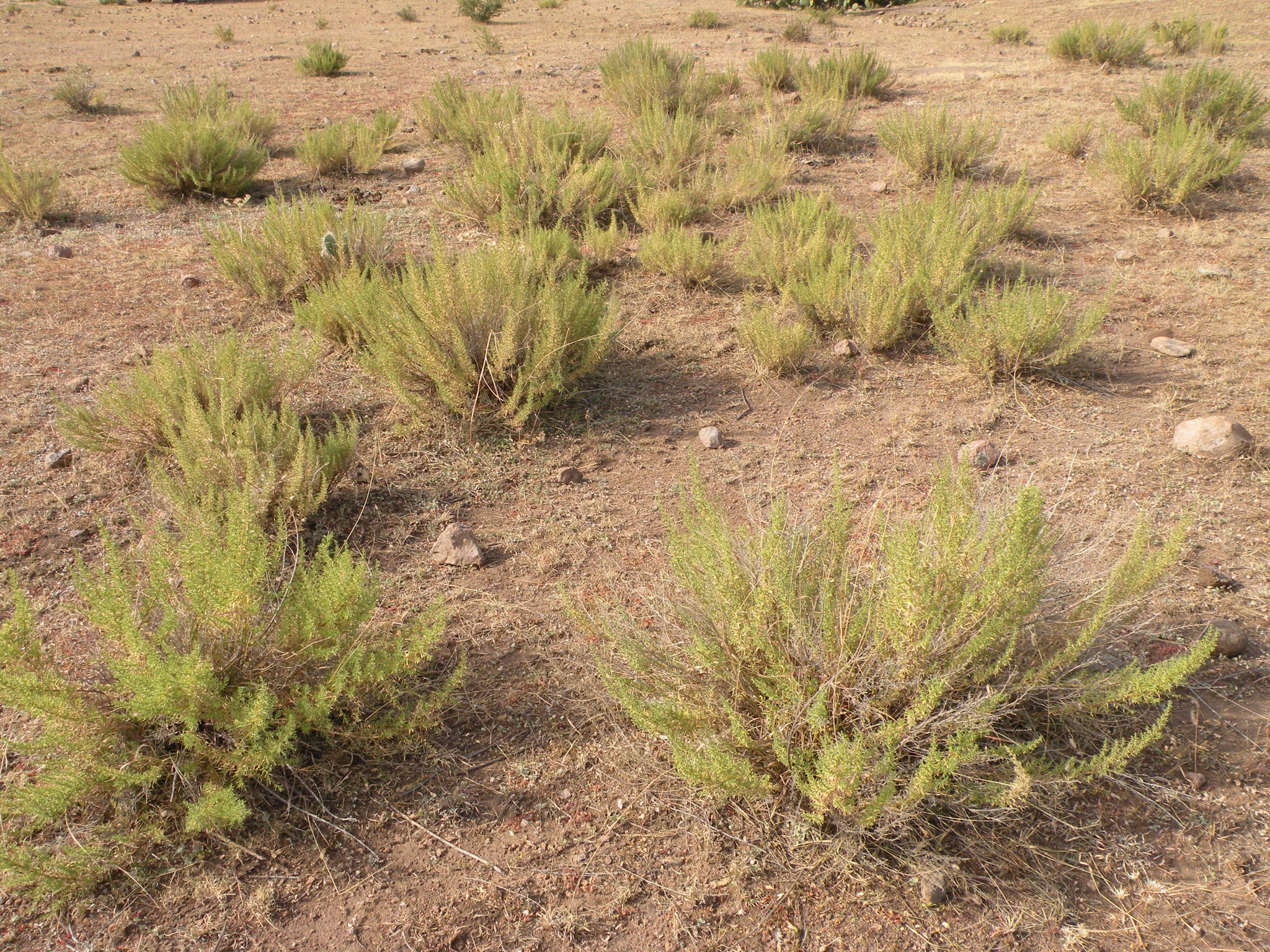

Scientific classification
- Kingdom: Plantae
- Clade: Tracheophytes
- Clade: Angiosperms
- Clade: Eudicots
- Clade: Asterids
- Order: Asterales
- Family: Asteraceae
- Genus: Brickellia
- Species: B. spinulosa

Binomial name
- Brickellia spinulosa (A.Gray) A.Gray

Synonyms
- Clavigera spinulosa A.Gray; Coleosanthus spinulosus (A.Gray) Kuntze

= Brickellia spinulosa =

Species of flowering plant

Brickellia spinulosa is a North American species of flowering plants in the family Asteraceae. It is native to northern and western Mexico (Chihuahua, Durango, Nuevo León, San Luis Potosí, Jalisco, Zacatecas).
