= Brickellia ambigens =

Scientific classification
- Kingdom: Plantae
- Clade: Tracheophytes
- Clade: Angiosperms
- Clade: Eudicots
- Clade: Asterids
- Order: Asterales
- Family: Asteraceae
- Genus: Brickellia
- Species: B. ambigens

Binomial name
- Brickellia ambigens (Greene) A. Nelson

Synonyms
- Coleosanthus ambigens Greene

Species of flowering plant

Brickellia ambigens is a North American species of flowering plants in the family Asteraceae. It is native to Lincoln County, New Mexico.
