= Brickellia paniculata =

Scientific classification
- Kingdom: Plantae
- Clade: Tracheophytes
- Clade: Angiosperms
- Clade: Eudicots
- Clade: Asterids
- Order: Asterales
- Family: Asteraceae
- Genus: Brickellia
- Species: B. paniculata

Binomial name
- Brickellia paniculata (Mill.) B.L.Rob.

Synonyms
- Ageratum paniculatum Hort. ex Steud.; Brickellia hartwegii A.Gray; Coleosanthus paniculatus (Mill.) Standl.; Coleosanthus rigidus (Benth.) Kuntze; Eriopappus paniculatus (Mill.) Hort. ex Loudon; Eupatorium leptopodum Gardner; Eupatorium paniculatum Mill.; Eupatorium rigidum Benth. 1841 not Sw. 1788; Eupatorium verae-crucis Steud.; Eupatorium veraecrucis Steud.

Species of flowering plant

Brickellia paniculata is a Mesoamerican species of flowering plant in the family Asteraceae. It is widespread in Tamaulipas west to Sinaloa and south as far as Costa Rica.
