= Brickellia simplex =

Scientific classification
- Kingdom: Plantae
- Clade: Tracheophytes
- Clade: Angiosperms
- Clade: Eudicots
- Clade: Asterids
- Order: Asterales
- Family: Asteraceae
- Genus: Brickellia
- Species: B. simplex

Binomial name
- Brickellia simplex A.Gray

Synonyms
- Coleosanthus simplex (A.Gray) Kuntze

Species of flowering plant

Brickellia simplex, the Sonoran brickellbush, is a North American species of flowering plants in the family Asteraceae. It is native to northern Mexico (Chihuahua, Sonora, Coahuila) and the southwestern United States (New Mexico, Arizona).

Brickellia simplex is a branching shrub up to 60 cm (24 inches) tall, growing from a woody caudex. It produces many small flower heads with yellow disc florets but no ray florets.
