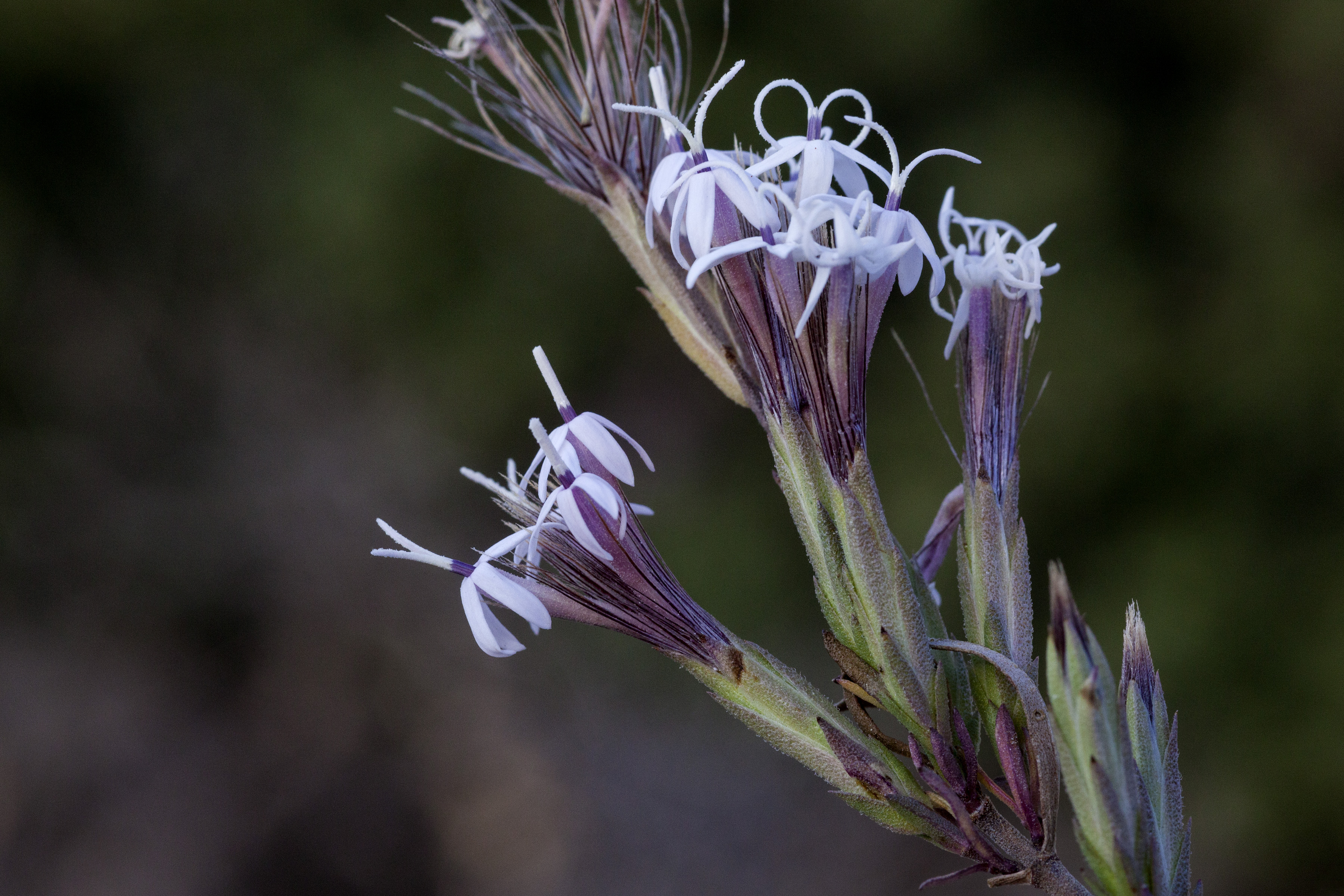
- Carphochaete bigelovii

Scientific classification
- Kingdom: Plantae
- Clade: Embryophytes
- Clade: Tracheophytes
- Clade: Angiosperms
- Clade: Eudicots
- Clade: Asterids
- Order: Asterales
- Family: Asteraceae
- Subfamily: Asteroideae
- Tribe: Eupatorieae
- Genus: Carphochaete; A.Gray

Type species
- Carphochaete wislizeni A.Gray

= Carphochaete =

Genus of flowering plants

Carphochaete is a genus of North American flowering plants in the family Asteraceae. They are native to Mexico and the southwestern United States. They are known commonly as bristleheads.

These are branching shrubs and subshrubs usually growing 20 to 45 centimeters tall, but known to well exceed one meter at times. The leaves have glandular pits. They are usually opposite but are sometimes arranged alternately. The flower heads are solitary or paired, or occasionally in arrays of several. They are just a few millimeters wide and usually contain 3 or 4 white, pink, or purple funnel-shaped disc florets, sometimes more. The hairy, ribbed cypsela is tipped with a pappus of long scales.

== Classification ==
Carphochaete is in the tribe Eupatorieae of the family Asteraceae. Like other members of this tribe, the flower heads have disc florets and no ray florets. Some authors include the genus Cronquistia in Carphochaete.

Species

- Carphochaete bigelovii - Chihuahua, Sonora, Arizona, New Mexico, western Texas
- Carphochaete durangensis - Durango
- Carphochaete grahamii - Durango, Aguascalientes, Guanajuato, Jalisco, México State, Michoacán, Zacatecas
- Carphochaete gummifera - Zacatecas
- Carphochaete schaffneri - San Luis Potosí
- Carphochaete wislizeni - Chihuahua, Sonora, Durango

formerly included

- Carphochaete macrocephala (Paray) Grashoff ex B.L.Turner & K.M.Kerr, Synonym of Revealia macrocephala (Paray) R.M.King & H.Rob.
- Carphochaete pringlei (S.Watson) Grashoff ex B.L.Turner, Synonym of Cronquistia pringlei (S.Watson) R.M.King
