= Phania =

Phania is the scientific name of two genera of organisms and may refer to:

- Phania (fly), a genus of flies in the family Tachinidae
- Phania (plant), a genus of plants in the family Asteraceae
