= Oxylobus =

Oxylobus may refer to:

- Oxylobus (beetle), a genus of beetles in the family Carabidae
- Oxylobus (plant), a genus of plant in the sunflower family
