= Bellina (disambiguation) =

Bellina may refer to:

Given name

- Meriam Bellina (born 1965), an Indonesian actress who acted in more than 50 films
- Bellina Logan, an American television and film actress

Other uses

- Bellina, a genus of bristle flies belonging to the family Tachinidae
- Iolaus bellina, a butterfly of the family Lycaenidae, also known as the white-spot sapphire
- Phalaenopsis bellina, a species of orchid endemic of Borneo
