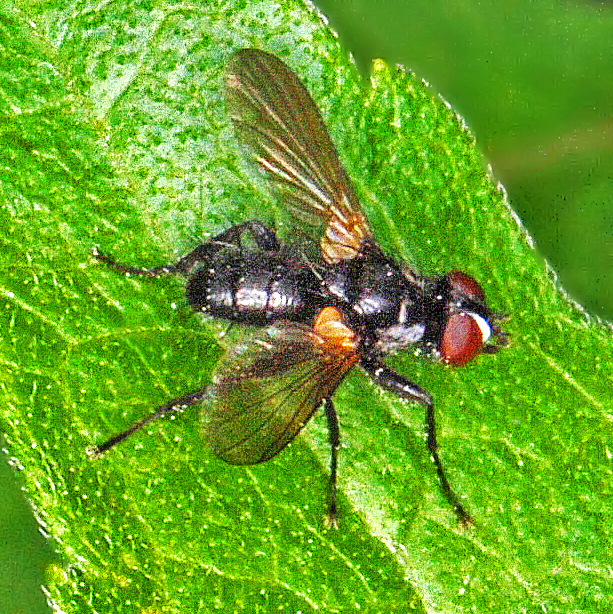
- Phania speculifrons (cf.)

Scientific classification
- Kingdom: Animalia
- Phylum: Arthropoda
- Clade: Pancrustacea
- Class: Insecta
- Order: Diptera
- Family: Tachinidae
- Subfamily: Phasiinae
- Tribe: Cylindromyiini
- Genus: Phania
- Species: P. speculifrons

Binomial name
- Phania speculifrons (Villeneuve, 1919)

Synonyms
- Weberia speculifrons Villeneuve, 1919; Weberia aureovittata Belanovsky, 1951; Weberia speculifera Villeneuve, 1922

= Phania speculifrons =

Species of fly

Phania speculifrons is a species of fly in the family Tachinidae.

== Distribution and habitat ==
This species is present in parts of Europe: Austria, Belgium, Bulgaria, Czech Republic, France, Germany, Hungary, Italy, Romania, Slovakia, the Netherlands, Ukraine and former Yugoslavia. It mainly inhabits mountain dry meadows at an elevation up to 1,850 metres (6,070 ft) above sea level.

== Description ==
Phania speculifrons can reach a body length of approximately 5–7 millimetres (0.20–0.28 in). These flies have a shiny, greyish abdomen. The ad apical spur of the fore tibia is longer than the dorsal one. In males, tergites 2 - 4, in females tergites 2 and 3 are dusted almost to the posterior edge.

== Biology ==
Phania speculifrons is a univoltine species. Adults fly from mid-June to July–August, feeding on flowers. Hosts of this parasitic species are unknown.

== Bibliography ==
- Ebrahim Gilasian, Ali Asghar Talebi, Joachim Ziegler & Shahab Manzari (2013): A review of the genus Phania Meigen, 1824 (Diptera: Tachinidae: Phasiinae) in Iran with the description of a new species, Zoology and Ecology, DOI:10.1080/21658005.2013.765174
- Data related to Phania speculifrons at Wikispecies
- Media related to Phania speculifrons at Wikimedia Commons
