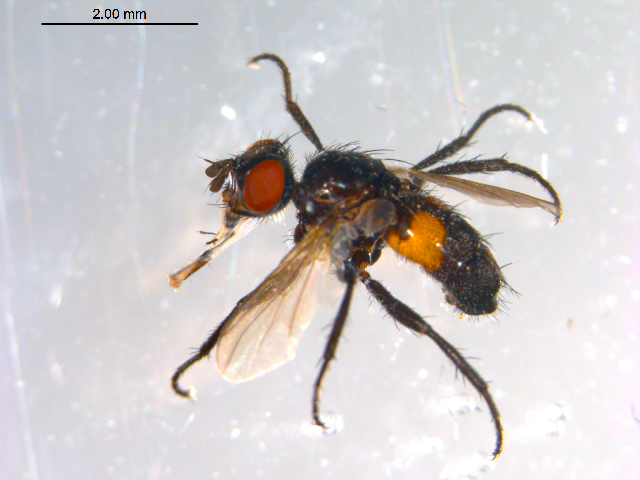

Scientific classification
- Kingdom: Animalia
- Phylum: Arthropoda
- Class: Insecta
- Order: Diptera
- Family: Tachinidae
- Tribe: Cylindromyiini
- Genus: Besseria
- Species: B. anthophila

Binomial name
- Besseria anthophila (Loew, 1871)

Synonyms
- Oedemasoma anthophila Loew, 1871; Melia forcipata Bigot, 1881

= Besseria anthophila =

Species of fly

Besseria anthophila is a species of bristle fly in the family Tachinidae.

== Distribution ==
Canada, United States, Poland, Finland, Sweden, Albania, Bulgaria, Greece, Italy, Serbia, Spain, France, Germany, Switzerland, Mongolia, Egypt, Russia.
