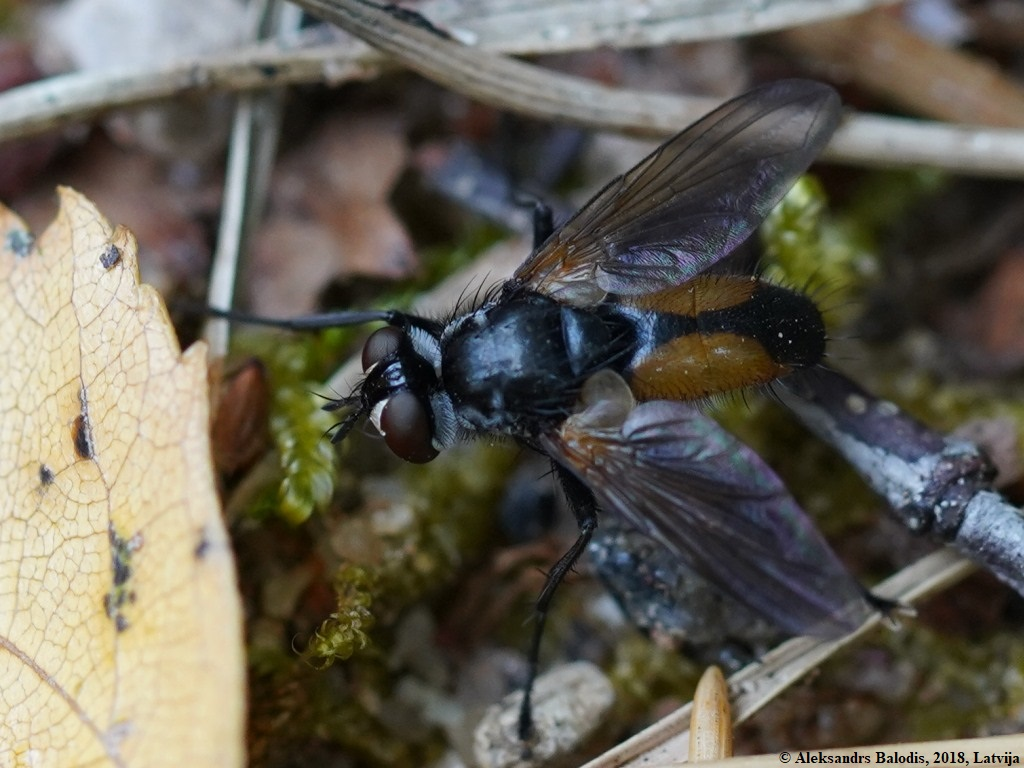

Scientific classification
- Kingdom: Animalia
- Phylum: Arthropoda
- Class: Insecta
- Order: Diptera
- Family: Tachinidae
- Subfamily: Phasiinae
- Tribe: Cylindromyiini
- Genus: Hemyda
- Species: H. vittata

Binomial name
- Hemyda vittata (Meigen, 1824)

Synonyms
- Phania vittata Meigen, 1824

= Hemyda vittata =

Species of fly

Hemyda vittata is a European species of fly in the family Tachinidae. It is a parasitoid of the species Troilus luridus.

== Distribution ==
British Isles, Czech Republic, Estonia, Hungary, Poland, Romania, Slovakia, Ukraine, Denmark, Finland, Sweden, Bulgaria, Croatia, Italy, Serbia, Slovenia, Spain, Austria, Belgium, France, Germany, Netherlands, Switzerland, Japan, Russia, Transcaucasia, China
