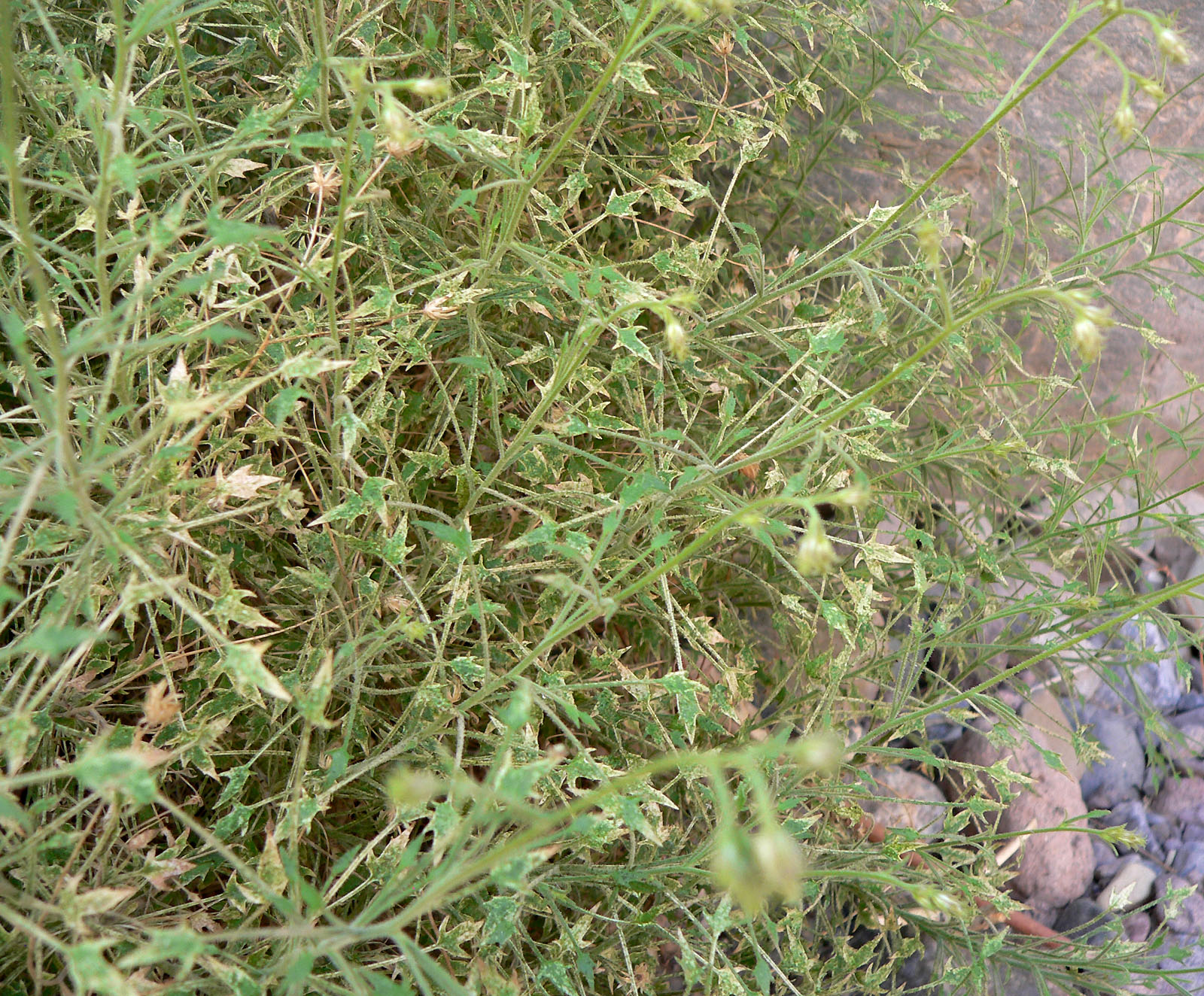
- Pleurocoronis pluriseta

Scientific classification
- Kingdom: Plantae
- Clade: Tracheophytes
- Clade: Angiosperms
- Clade: Eudicots
- Clade: Asterids
- Order: Asterales
- Family: Asteraceae
- Subfamily: Asteroideae
- Tribe: Eupatorieae
- Genus: Pleurocoronis; R.M.King & H.Rob.

Type species
- Hofmeisteria pluriseta A.Gray

= Pleurocoronis =

Genus of plants

Pleurocoronis is a genus of North American shrubs or subshrubs native to the southwestern United States and northwestern Mexico. It is in the tribe Eupatorieae within the family Asteraceae. All known members had been considered members of the related genus Hofmeisteria before being moved to Pleurocoronis.

Species

- Pleurocoronis gentryi (Wiggins) R.M.King & H.Rob. - Baja California, Baja California Sur
- Pleurocoronis laphamioides (Rose) R.M.King & H.Rob. - Baja California, Baja California Sur, Sonora
- Pleurocoronis pluriseta (A.Gray) R.M.King & H.Rob. - California, Nevada, Arizona, Utah, Baja California, Baja California Sur, Sonora
