= Besseria brevipennis =

Scientific classification
- Kingdom: Animalia
- Phylum: Arthropoda
- Class: Insecta
- Order: Diptera
- Family: Tachinidae
- Subfamily: Phasiinae
- Tribe: Cylindromyiini
- Genus: Besseria
- Species: B. brevipennis

Binomial name
- Besseria brevipennis (Loew, 1863)

Synonyms
- Oedemasoma nuda Townsend, 1908; Wahlbergia brevipennis Loew, 1863

Species of fly

Besseria brevipennis is a species of bristle fly in the family Tachinidae.

== Distribution ==
Canada, United States.
