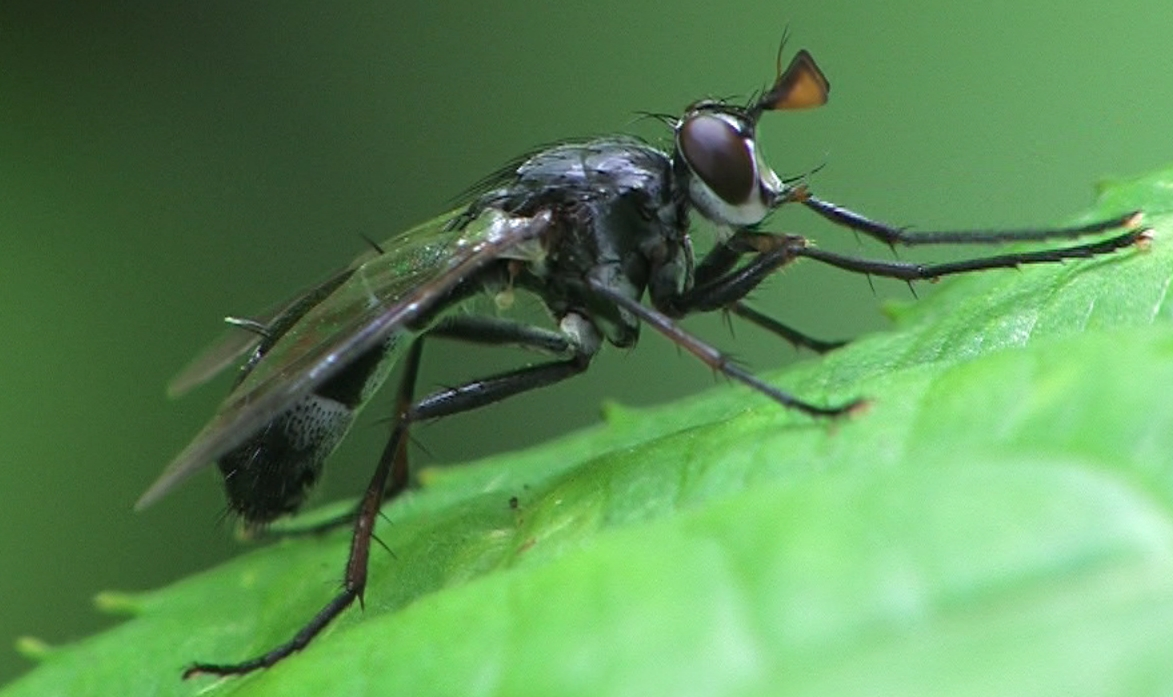
- Lophosia fasciata

Scientific classification
- Kingdom: Animalia
- Phylum: Arthropoda
- Clade: Pancrustacea
- Class: Insecta
- Order: Diptera
- Family: Tachinidae
- Subfamily: Phasiinae
- Tribe: Cylindromyiini
- Genus: Lophosia
- Species: L. fasciata

Binomial name
- Lophosia fasciata Meigen, 1824

= Lophosia fasciata =

Species of fly

Lophosia fasciata is a European species of fly in the family Tachinidae. It is the type species of the genus Lophosia.

== Distribution ==
British Isles, Czech Republic, Estonia, Hungary, Poland, Romania, Slovakia, Ukraine, Denmark, Finland, Norway, Sweden, Bulgaria, Corsica, Croatia, Italy, Serbia, Slovenia, Austria, Belgium, France, Germany, Netherlands, Switzerland, Japan, Russia, Transcaucasia, China.
