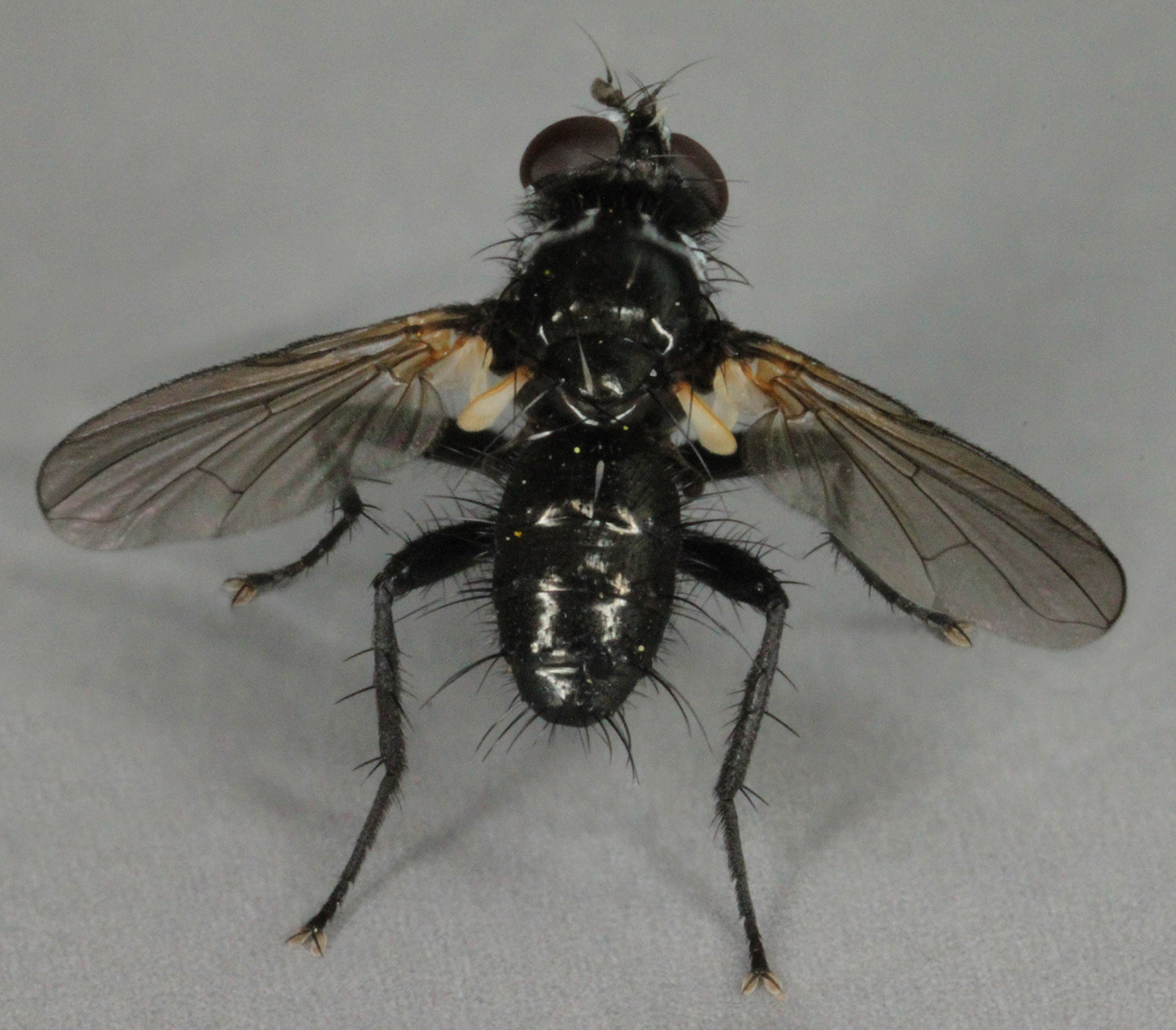
- Phania funesta

Scientific classification
- Kingdom: Animalia
- Phylum: Arthropoda
- Clade: Pancrustacea
- Class: Insecta
- Order: Diptera
- Family: Tachinidae
- Subfamily: Phasiinae
- Tribe: Cylindromyiini
- Genus: Phania
- Species: P. funesta

Binomial name
- Phania funesta (Meigen, 1824)

Synonyms
- Tachina funesta Meigen, 1824; Megaera nitida Macquart, 1834; Phania pseudofunesta Villeneuve, 1931; Weberia pseudofunesta Villeneuve, 1931

= Phania funesta =

Species of fly

Phania funesta is a European species of fly in the family Tachinidae.
