= Phania thoracica =

Scientific classification
- Kingdom: Animalia
- Phylum: Arthropoda
- Clade: Pancrustacea
- Class: Insecta
- Order: Diptera
- Family: Tachinidae
- Subfamily: Phasiinae
- Tribe: Cylindromyiini
- Genus: Phania
- Species: P. thoracica

Binomial name
- Phania thoracica Meigen, 1824

Species of fly

Phania thoracica is a European species of fly in the family Tachinidae. It is the type species of the genus Phania.

== Distribution ==
British Isles, Czech Republic, Hungary, Poland, Romania, Slovakia, Ukraine, Denmark, Finland, Norway, Sweden, Greece, Italy, Slovenia, Spain, Austria, Belgium, France, Germany, Switzerland, Russia, Transcaucasia.
