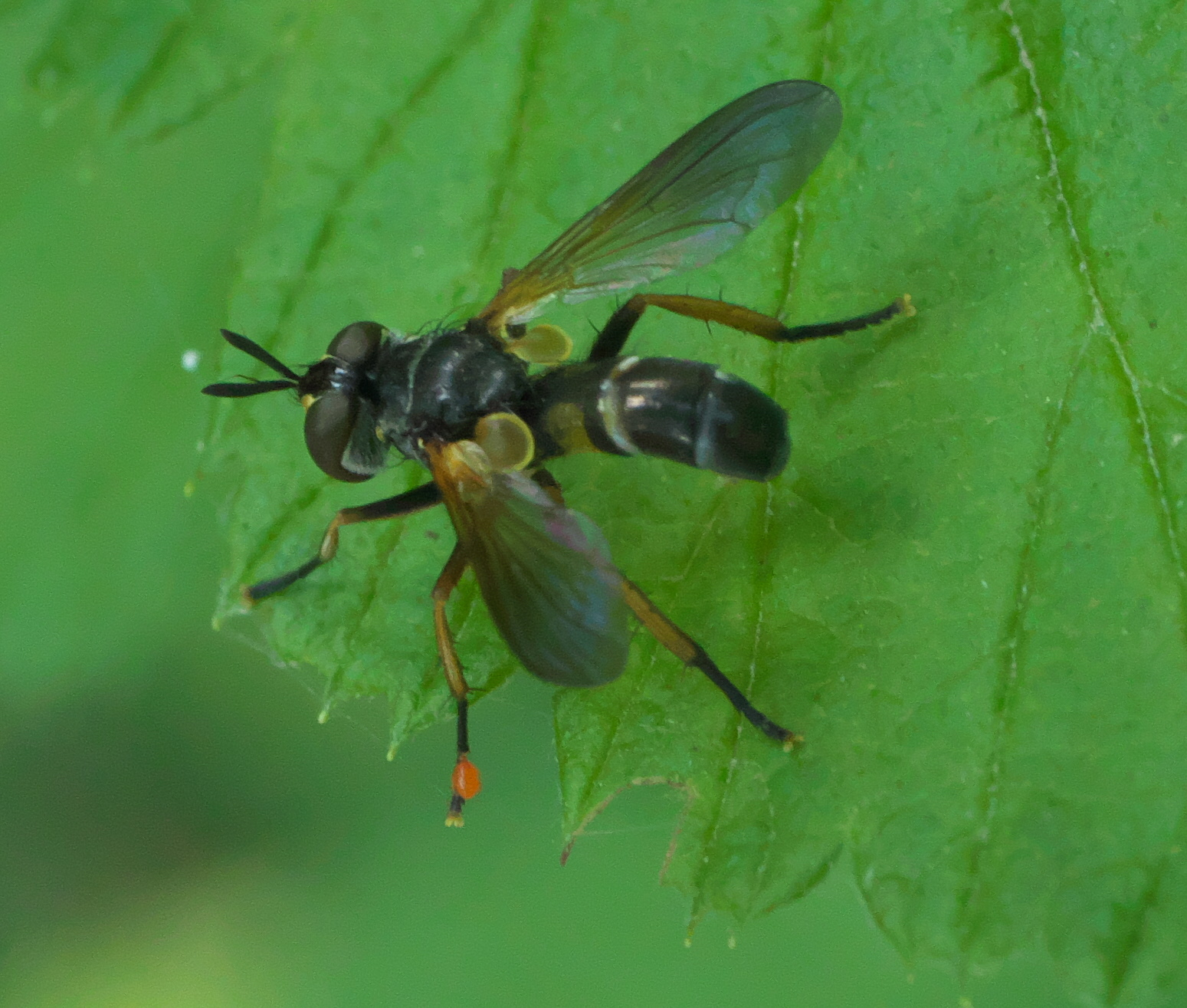

Scientific classification
- Kingdom: Animalia
- Phylum: Arthropoda
- Class: Insecta
- Order: Diptera
- Family: Tachinidae
- Subfamily: Phasiinae
- Tribe: Cylindromyiini
- Genus: Hemyda
- Species: H. aurata

Binomial name
- Hemyda aurata Robineau-Desvoidy, 1830

Synonyms
- Hemyda latipennis Curran, 1924; Ancylogaster armatus Bigot, 1884

= Hemyda aurata =

Species of fly

Hemyda aurata is a species of bristle fly in the family Tachinidae.

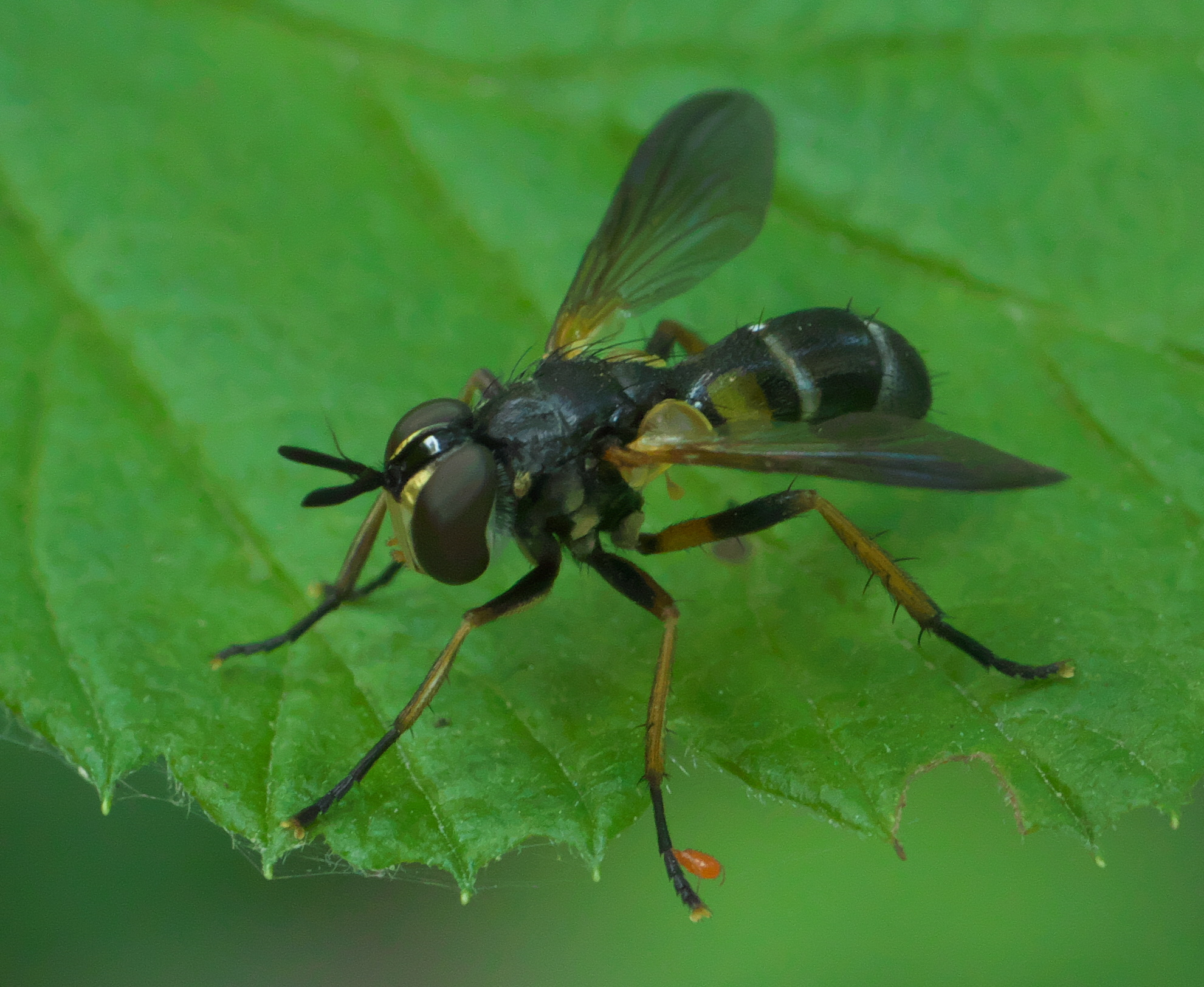

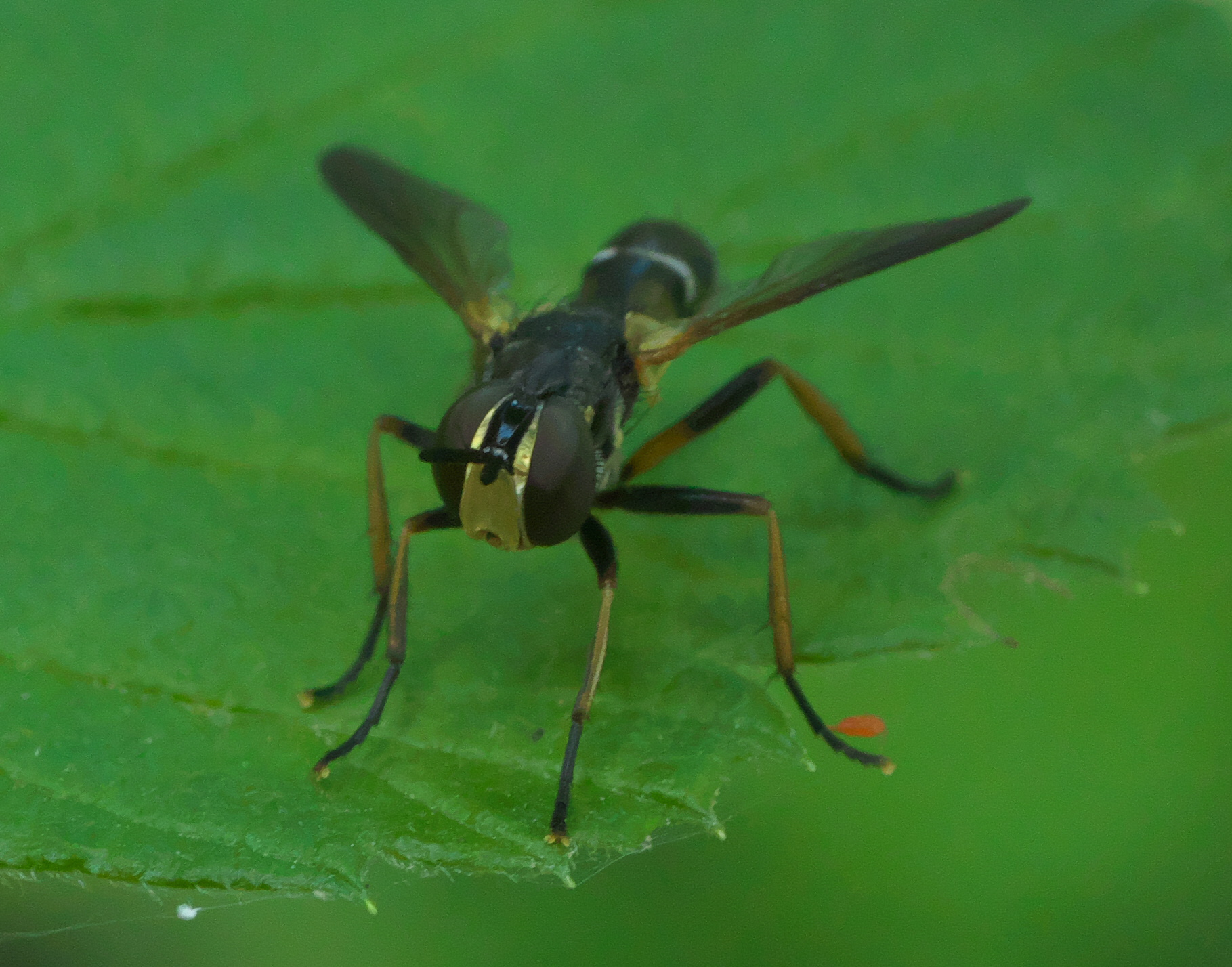

== Distribution ==
Canada, United States, Mexico.
