= Neolophosia =

Scientific classification
- Kingdom: Animalia
- Phylum: Arthropoda
- Class: Insecta
- Order: Diptera
- Family: Tachinidae
- Subfamily: Phasiinae
- Tribe: Cylindromyiini
- Genus: Neolophosia; Townsend, 1939

Type species
- Neolophosia shannoni Townsend, 1939

Genus of flies

Neolophosia is a genus of flies in the family Tachinidae.

== Species ==
- Neolophosia shannoni Townsend, 1939

== Distribution ==
Brazil.
