= Neobrachelia =

Scientific classification
- Kingdom: Animalia
- Phylum: Arthropoda
- Clade: Pancrustacea
- Class: Insecta
- Order: Diptera
- Family: Tachinidae
- Subfamily: Phasiinae
- Tribe: Cylindromyiini
- Genus: Neobrachelia; Townsend, 1931

Type species
- Neobrachelia charapemyioides Townsend, 1931

Synonyms
- Xenopyxis Townsend, 1940; Xenophyxis Townsend, 1942

Genus of flies

Neobrachelia is a genus of flies in the family Tachinidae.

== Species ==
- Neobrachelia charapemyioides Townsend, 1931
- Neobrachelia edessae (Townsend, 1942)
- Neobrachelia grandis (Townsend, 1940)
- Neobrachelia mirabilis (Townsend, 1940)
