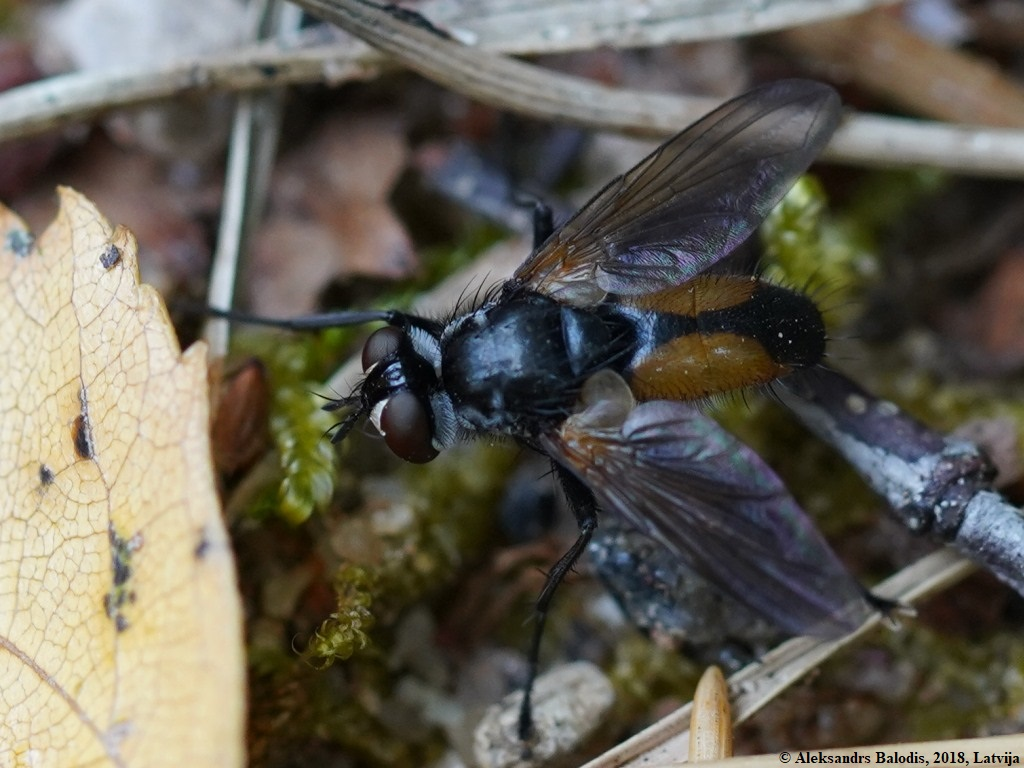
- Hemyda vittata

Scientific classification
- Kingdom: Animalia
- Phylum: Arthropoda
- Clade: Pancrustacea
- Class: Insecta
- Order: Diptera
- Family: Tachinidae
- Subfamily: Phasiinae
- Tribe: Cylindromyiini
- Genus: Hemyda; Robineau-Desvoidy, 1830

Synonyms
- Ancylogaster Bigot, 1884; Euphania Townsend, 1916; Evibrissa Rondani, 1861; Phanaiba Dupuis, 1973; Phania Brauer & von Berganstamm, 1889

= Hemyda =

Genus of flies

Hemyda is a genus of flies in the family Tachinidae.

== Species ==
- Hemyda aurata Robineau-Desvoidy, 1830
- Hemyda conopoides Guimarães, 1979
- Hemyda decumana Reinhard, 1958
- Hemyda deqinensis Wang, Zhang & Wang, 2015
- Hemyda dominikae Draber-Mońko, 2009
- Hemyda hertingi Ziegler & Shima, 1996
- Hemyda obscuripennis (Meigen, 1824)
- Hemyda vittata (Meigen, 1824)
- Hemyda zonula Reinhard, 1955
