= Catapariprosopa =

Scientific classification
- Kingdom: Animalia
- Phylum: Arthropoda
- Class: Insecta
- Order: Diptera
- Family: Tachinidae
- Subfamily: Phasiinae
- Tribe: Cylindromyiini
- Genus: Catapariprosopa; Townsend, 1927

Type species
- Catapariprosopa curvicauda Townsend, 1927

Synonyms
- Chaetoweberia Villeneuve, 1932; Hemiphania Villeneuve, 1937; Phaniola Mesnil, 1978

Genus of flies

Catapariprosopa is a genus of flies in the family Tachinidae.

== Species ==
- Catapariprosopa cerina (Mesnil, 1978)
- Catapariprosopa cilipes (Mesnil, 1978)
- Catapariprosopa cultellifera (Mesnil, 1978)
- Catapariprosopa cumatilis (Mesnil, 1978)
- Catapariprosopa curvicauda Townsend, 1927
- Catapariprosopa cyanella (Mesnil, 1978)
- Catapariprosopa edwardsi (Emden, 1945)
- Catapariprosopa liturata (Mesnil, 1978)
- Catapariprosopa nigrapex (Mesnil, 1978)
- Catapariprosopa rubiginans (Villeneuve, 1932)
- Catapariprosopa russipes (Mesnil, 1978)
- Catapariprosopa trispina (Villeneuve, 1937)
