= Hemyda obscuripennis =

Scientific classification
- Kingdom: Animalia
- Phylum: Arthropoda
- Clade: Pancrustacea
- Class: Insecta
- Order: Diptera
- Family: Tachinidae
- Subfamily: Phasiinae
- Tribe: Cylindromyiini
- Genus: Hemyda
- Species: H. obscuripennis

Binomial name
- Hemyda obscuripennis (Meigen, 1824)

Synonyms
- Phania obscuripennis Meigen, 1824

Species of fly

Hemyda obscuripennis is a European species of fly in the family Tachinidae.

== Distribution ==
Czech Republic, Hungary, Poland, Romania, Slovakia, Ukraine, Finland, Andorra, Bulgaria, Italy, Serbia, Spain, Yugoslavia, Austria, Belgium, France, Germany, Netherlands, Switzerland, Japan, Iran, Algeria, Russia, Taiwan, China.
