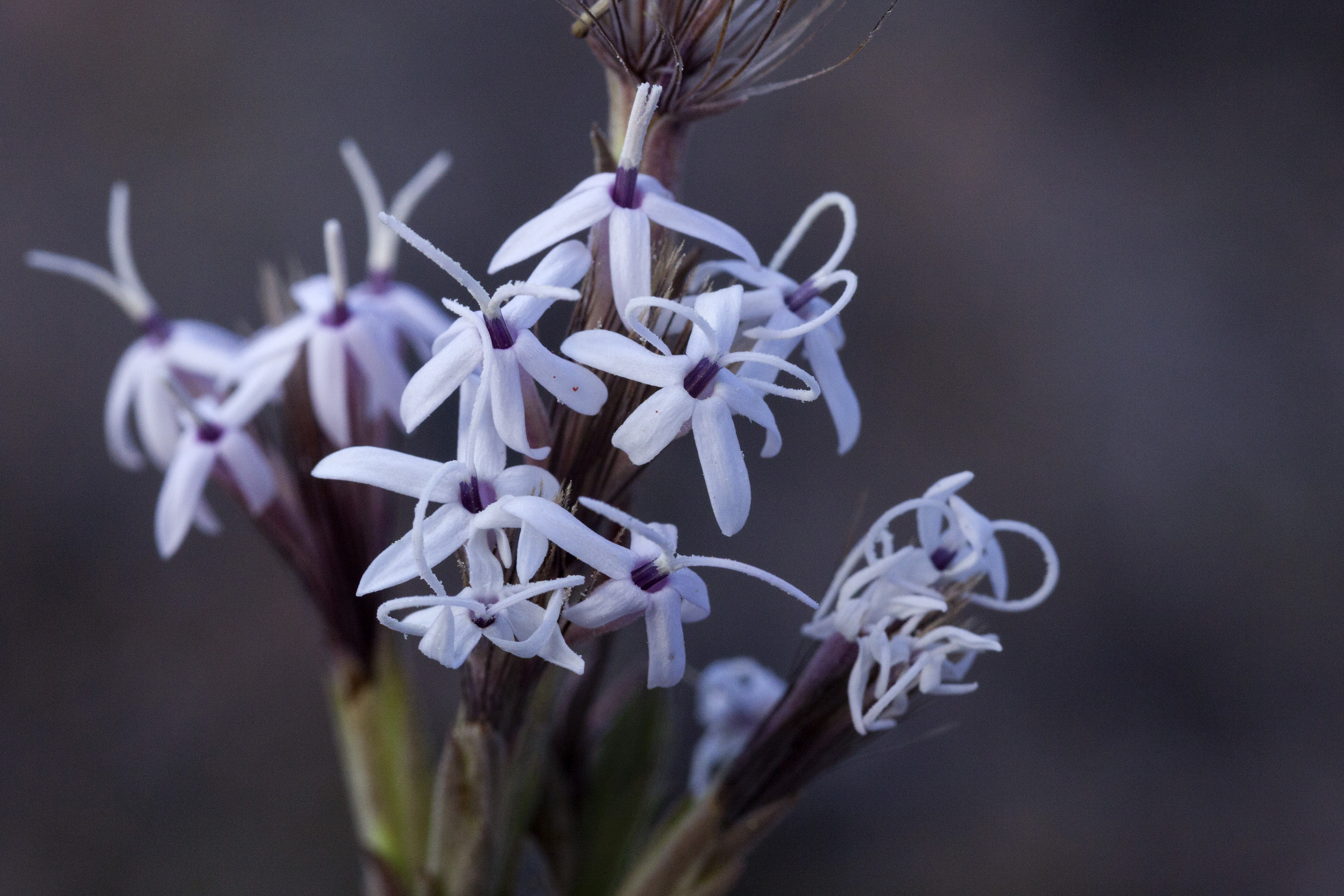

Scientific classification
- Kingdom: Plantae
- Clade: Tracheophytes
- Clade: Angiosperms
- Clade: Eudicots
- Clade: Asterids
- Order: Asterales
- Family: Asteraceae
- Genus: Carphochaete
- Species: C. bigelovii

Binomial name
- Carphochaete bigelovii A.Gray

Synonyms
- Carphochaete bigelowii A.Gray

= Carphochaete bigelovii =

Species of flowering plant

Carphochaete bigelovii, common name Bigelow's bristlehead, is a species of North American flowering plants in the family Asteraceae. They are native to northern Mexico (Coahuila, Chihuahua, Durango, Sonora) and the southwestern United States (Arizona, New Mexico, western Texas).

Carphochaete bigelovii is a shrub sometimes reaching a height of as much as 300 cm (10 feet) tall. Flower heads are usually borne 1 or 2 per branch, with disc florets but no ray florets. Florets are generally purple with white lobes around the edge.
