= Polistiopsis =

Scientific classification
- Kingdom: Animalia
- Phylum: Arthropoda
- Class: Insecta
- Order: Diptera
- Family: Tachinidae
- Subfamily: Phasiinae
- Tribe: Cylindromyiini
- Genus: Polistiopsis; Townsend, 1915

Type species
- Polistiopsis mima Townsend, 1915

Genus of flies

Polistiopsis is a genus of flies in the family Tachinidae.

== Species ==
- Polistiopsis mima Townsend, 1915
- Polistiopsis williamsi Arnaud, 1966
