= Carphochaete gummifera =

Scientific classification
- Kingdom: Plantae
- Clade: Tracheophytes
- Clade: Angiosperms
- Clade: Eudicots
- Clade: Asterids
- Order: Asterales
- Family: Asteraceae
- Genus: Carphochaete
- Species: C. gummifera

Binomial name
- Carphochaete gummifera McVaugh

Species of flowering plant

Carphochaete gummifera is a species of Mexican flowering plants in the family Asteraceae. They are native to Zacatecas in north-central Mexico.
