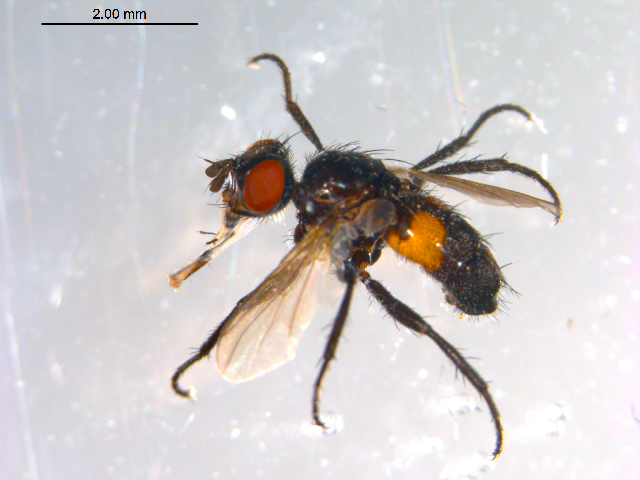
- Besseria anthophila

Scientific classification
- Kingdom: Animalia
- Phylum: Arthropoda
- Class: Insecta
- Order: Diptera
- Family: Tachinidae
- Subfamily: Phasiinae
- Tribe: Cylindromyiini
- Genus: Besseria; Robineau-Desvoidy, 1830

Type species
- Besseria reflexa Robineau-Desvoidy, 1830

Synonyms
- Apinops Coquillett, 1897; Apostrophus Loew, 1871; Apostrophusia Townsend, 1933; Oedemasoma Townsend, 1908; Oedemasonia Curran, 1934; Phaniosoma Rondani, 1856; Phanisioma Lioy, 1864; Wahlbergia Zetterstedt, 1842

= Besseria =

Genus of flies

Besseria is a genus of flies in the family Tachinidae.

== Species ==
- Besseria anthophila (Loew, 1871)
- Besseria brevipennis (Loew, 1863)
- Besseria caffra Villeneuve, 1920
- Besseria dimidiata (Zetterstedt, 1844)
- Besseria excavata Herting, 1979
- Besseria fossulata Bezzi, 1908
- Besseria incompleta Curran, 1926
- Besseria lateritia (Meigen, 1824)
- Besseria melanura (Meigen, 1824)
- Besseria nuditibia Kugler, 1977
- Besseria oblita Herting, 1979
- Besseria pilimacula Herting, 1973
- Besseria prophetarum Cerretti, Lo Giudice & Mei, 2010
- Besseria reflexa Robineau-Desvoidy, 1830
- Besseria zonaria (Loew, 1847)
