= Carphochaete schaffneri =

Scientific classification
- Kingdom: Plantae
- Clade: Tracheophytes
- Clade: Angiosperms
- Clade: Eudicots
- Clade: Asterids
- Order: Asterales
- Family: Asteraceae
- Genus: Carphochaete
- Species: C. schaffneri

Binomial name
- Carphochaete schaffneri Greenm.

Species of flowering plant

Carphochaete schaffneri is a species of Mexican flowering plants in the family Asteraceae. They are native to San Luis Potosí in northeastern Mexico.
