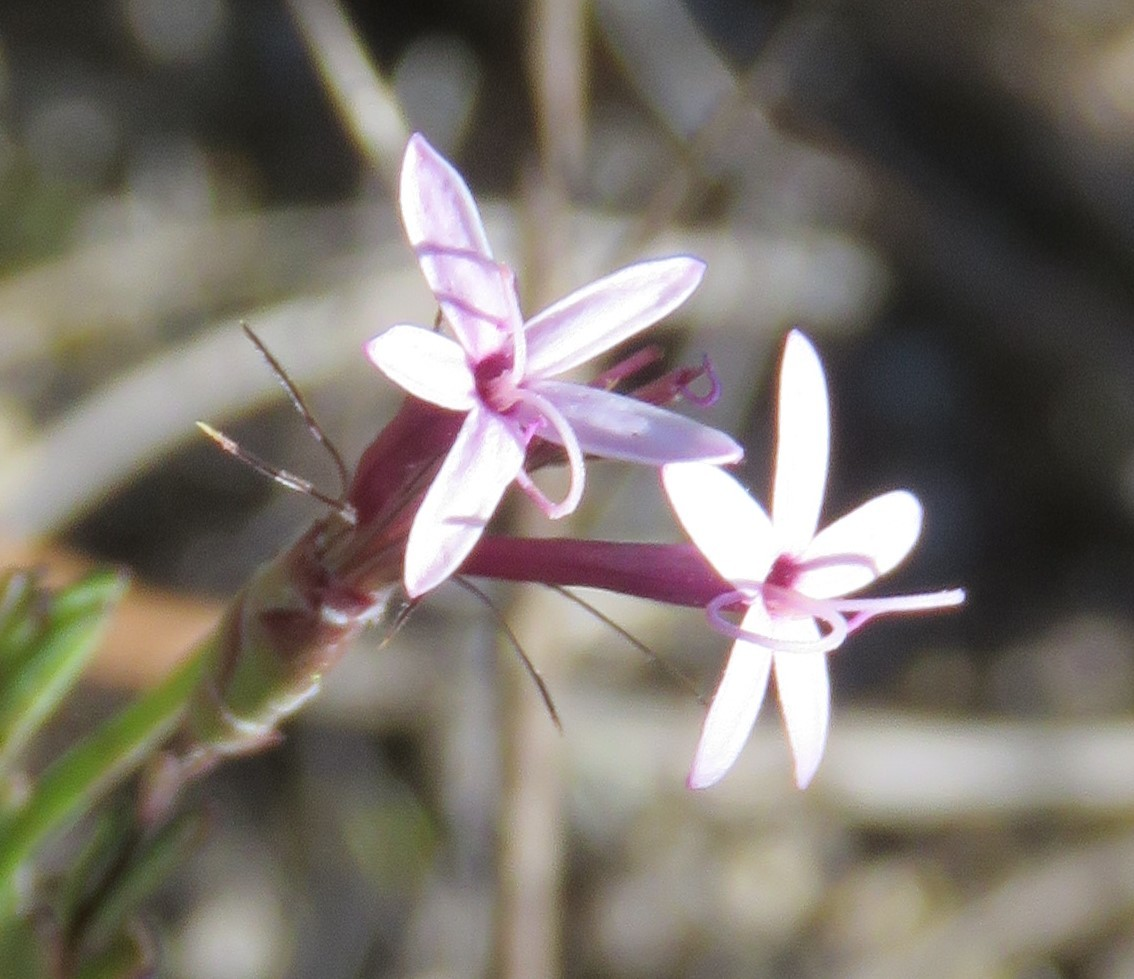

Scientific classification
- Kingdom: Plantae
- Clade: Tracheophytes
- Clade: Angiosperms
- Clade: Eudicots
- Clade: Asterids
- Order: Asterales
- Family: Asteraceae
- Genus: Carphochaete
- Species: C. grahamii

Binomial name
- Carphochaete grahamii A.Gray

= Carphochaete grahamii =

Species of flowering plant

Carphochaete grahamii is a species of Mexican flowering plants in the family Asteraceae. They are native to Durango, Aguascalientes, Guanajuato, Jalisco, México State, Michoacán, and Zacatecas in central and western Mexico.
