= Oxylobus (plant) =

Scientific classification
- Kingdom: Plantae
- Clade: Tracheophytes
- Clade: Angiosperms
- Clade: Eudicots
- Clade: Asterids
- Order: Asterales
- Family: Asteraceae
- Subfamily: Asteroideae
- Tribe: Eupatorieae
- Genus: Oxylobus (DC.) Moc. ex A.Gray

Type species
- Phania trinervia DC.

Synonyms
- Phania sect. Oxylobus Moc. ex DC.

Genus of flowering plants

Oxylobus is a genus of Mesoamerican flowering plants in the tribe Eupatorieae within the family Asteraceae.

Species

- Oxylobus adscendens (Sch.Bip. ex Hemsl.) B.L.Rob. & Greenm. - from Hidalgo to Guatemala
- Oxylobus arbutifolius (Kunth) A.Gray - from Puebla to Guatemala
- Oxylobus glandulifer (Sch.Bip. ex Benth. & Hook.f.) A.Gray - from Veracruz to Guatemala
- Oxylobus oaxacanus S.F.Blake - Oaxaca, Chiapas
- Oxylobus preecei B.L.Turner - Oaxaca, Puebla
- Oxylobus subglabrus R.M.King & H.Rob. - Oaxaca

formerly included

see Phania Revealia

- Oxylobus macrocephalus Paray - Revealia macrocephala (Paray) R.M.King & H.Rob.
- Oxylobus trinervius Moc. ex DC. - Phania trinervia DC.
