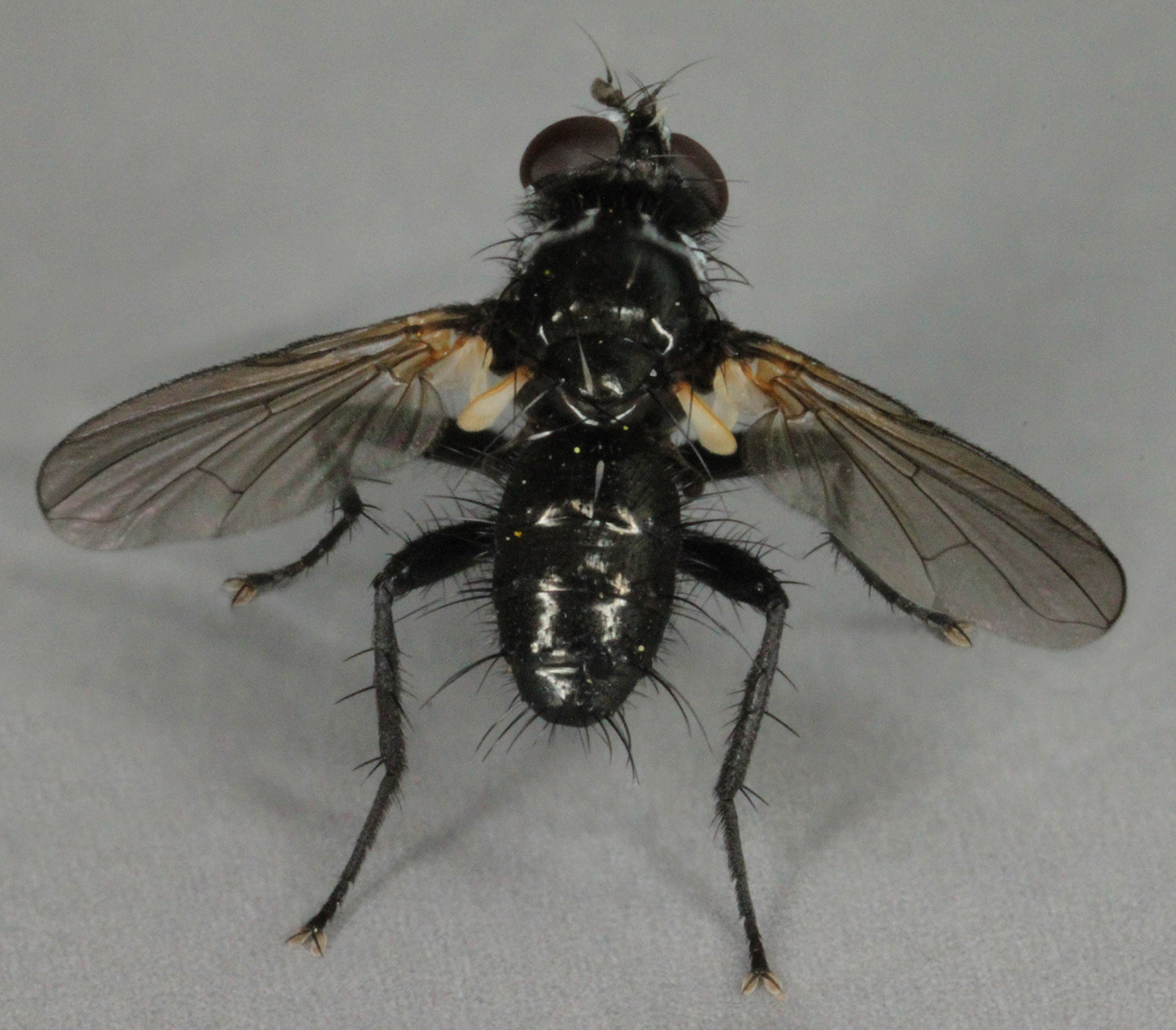
- Phania funesta

Scientific classification
- Kingdom: Animalia
- Phylum: Arthropoda
- Class: Insecta
- Order: Diptera
- Family: Tachinidae
- Subfamily: Phasiinae
- Tribe: Cylindromyiini
- Genus: Phania; Meigen, 1824

Type species
- Phania obscuripennis Meigen, 1824

Synonyms
- Bohemania Robineau-Desvoidy, 1863; Bohemannia Bezzi & Stein, 1907; Cercomyia Brauer & von Berganstamm, 1889; Neuromyia Bezzi, 1907; Phonia Blanchard, 1845; Uromya Rondani, 1856

= Phania (fly) =

Genus of flies

Phania is a genus of flies in the family Tachinidae.

== Species ==
- Phania albisquama (Villeneuve, 1924)
- Phania curvicauda (Fallén, 1820)
- Phania funesta (Meigen, 1824)
- Phania incrassata Pandellé, 1894
- Phania rufomaculata Gilasian & Ziegler, 2013
- Phania speculifrons (Villeneuve, 1919)
- Phania thoracica Meigen, 1824
