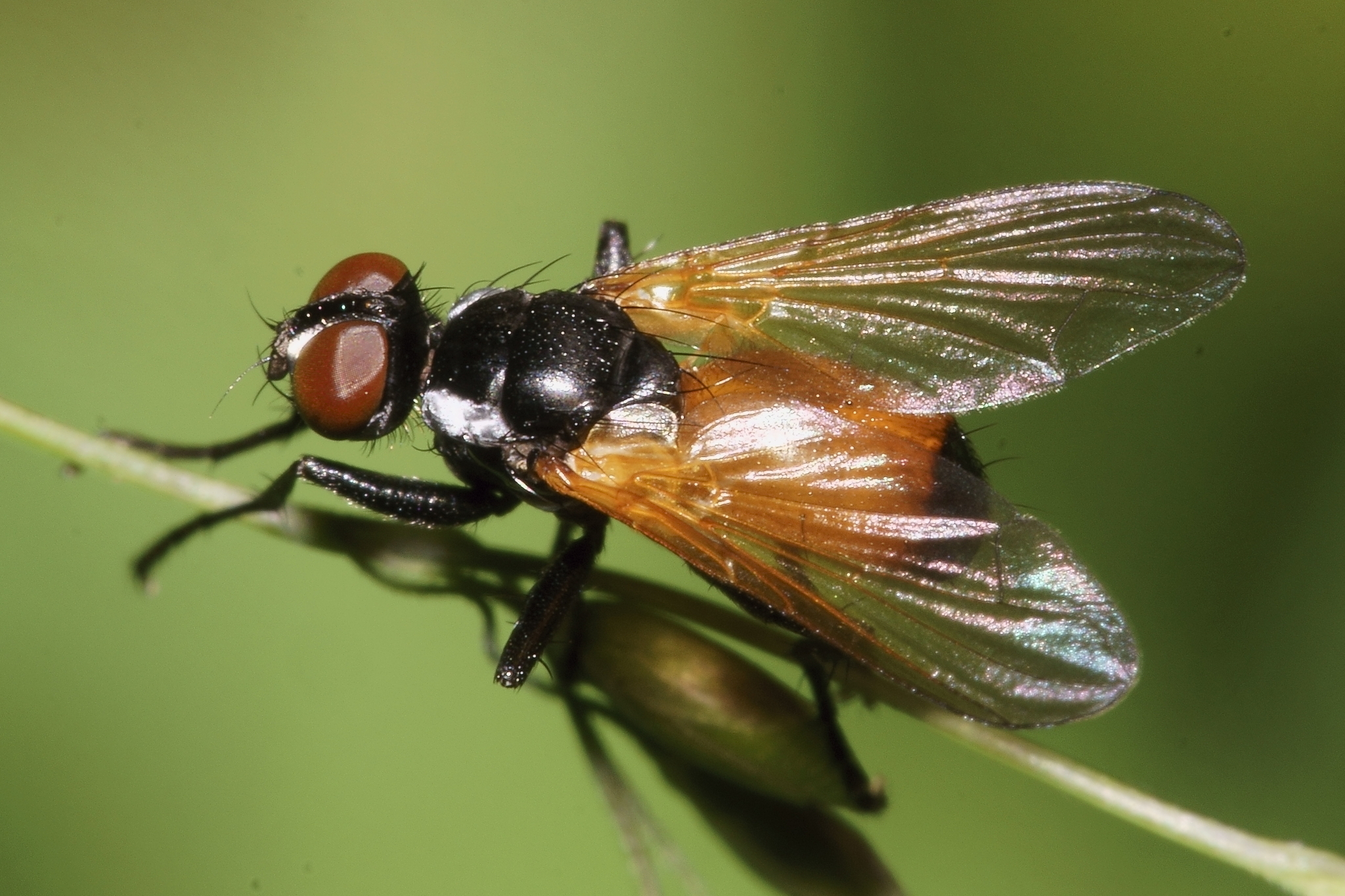

Scientific classification
- Kingdom: Animalia
- Phylum: Arthropoda
- Clade: Pancrustacea
- Class: Insecta
- Order: Diptera
- Family: Tachinidae
- Subfamily: Phasiinae
- Tribe: Cylindromyiini
- Genus: Huttonobesseria; Curran, 1927
- Species: H. verecunda

Binomial name
- Huttonobesseria verecunda (Hutton, 1901)

Synonyms
- (Species): Phania verecunda Hutton, 1901

= Huttonobesseria =

Huttonobesseria verecunda

Genus of flies

Huttonobesseria is a genus of flies in the family Tachinidae. It is monotypic, being represented by the single species Huttonobesseria verecunda which is found in New Zealand.
