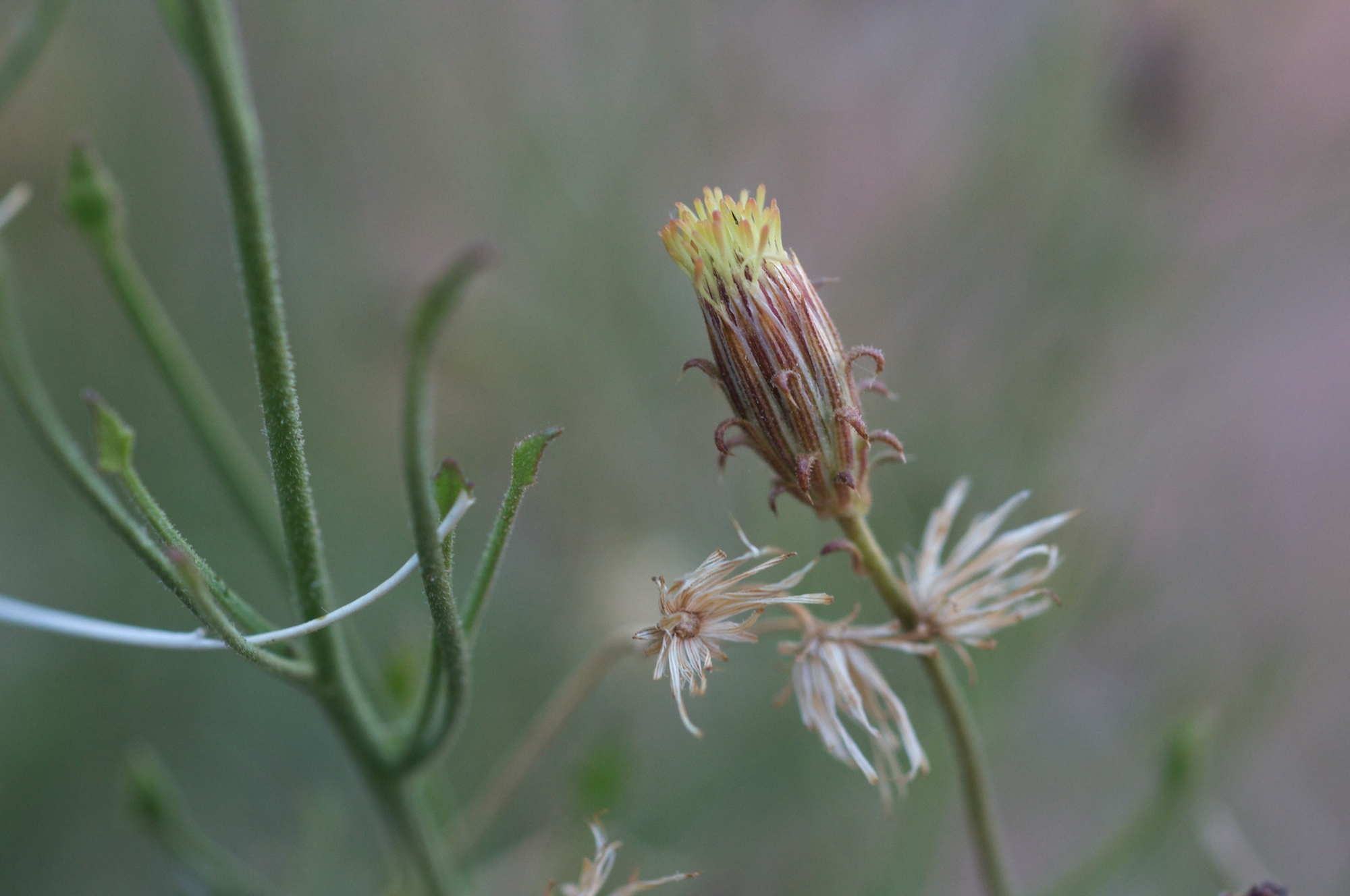
- Inflorescence
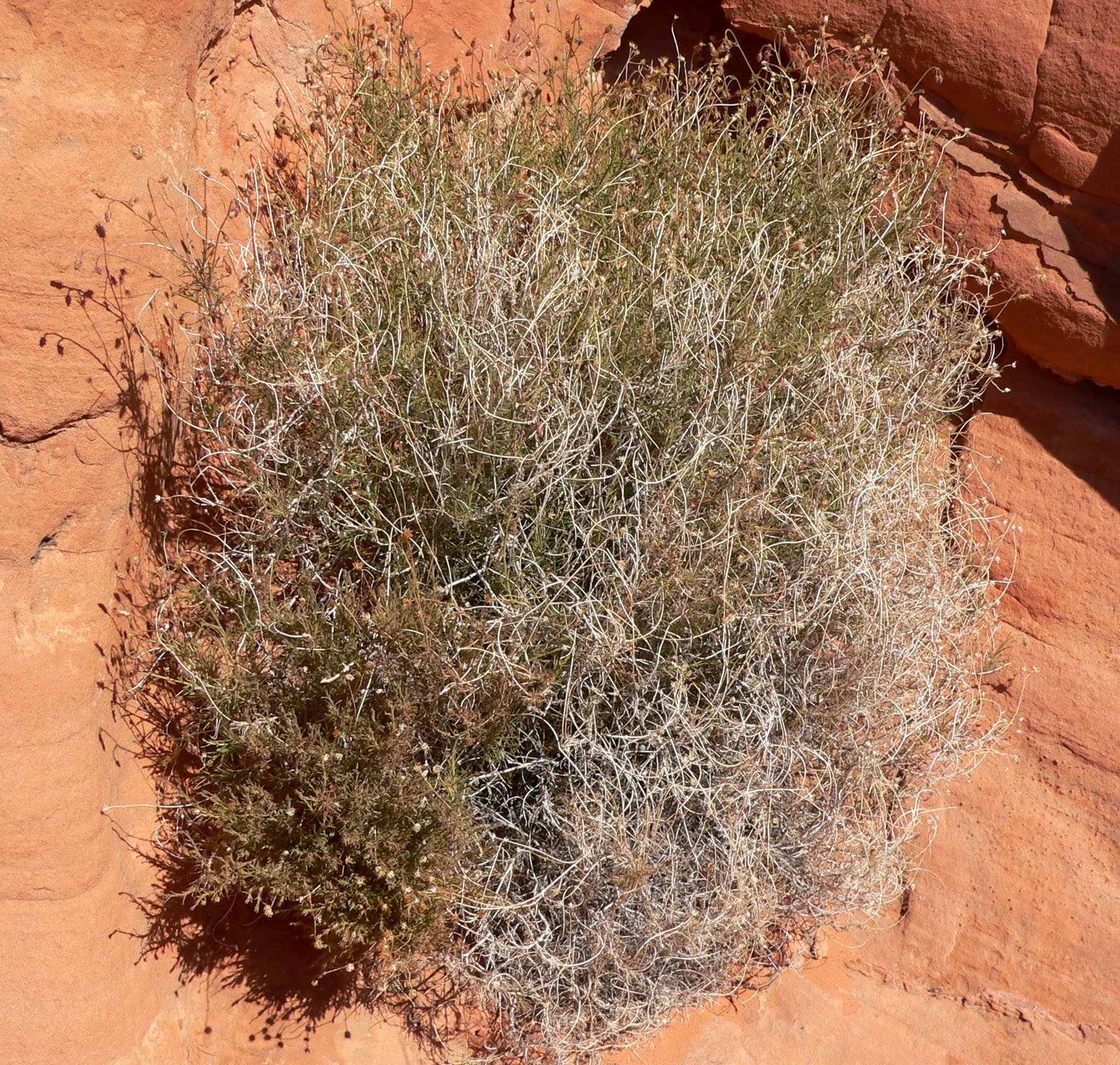
- Habit

Conservation status
- Secure (NatureServe)

Scientific classification
- Kingdom: Plantae
- Clade: Embryophytes
- Clade: Tracheophytes
- Clade: Spermatophytes
- Clade: Angiosperms
- Clade: Eudicots
- Clade: Asterids
- Order: Asterales
- Family: Asteraceae
- Genus: Pleurocoronis
- Species: P. pluriseta

Binomial name
- Pleurocoronis pluriseta (A.Gray) King & H.Rob.

Synonyms
- Hofmeisteria pluriseta A.Gray

= Pleurocoronis pluriseta =

Species of plant

Pleurocoronis pluriseta is a species of flowering plant in the family Asteraceae known by the common name bush arrowleaf. It is native to the southwestern United States and northern Mexico, where it grows in desert scrub and similar habitat. This is a clumpy or bushy subshrub reaching up to about half a meter in maximum height with many slender branches. The distinctive leaves are several centimeters in length and are mostly petiole; there is generally a toothed diamond- or arrowhead-shaped blade no more than one centimeter long at the very tip. The inflorescence is made up of one or two flower heads, sometimes more. Each flower head is somewhat cylindrical or bullet-shaped, measuring up to about a centimeter long. The head is discoid, containing only disc florets and no ray florets. It is lined with a series of many phyllaries coated thinly in glandular hairs and often streaked with purple-red coloration. The tips of the outer phyllaries curve outward. The fruit is a hairy, ribbed achene a few millimeters long with a pappus of bristles and scales on its tip.
