= Pygidimyia =

Scientific classification
- Kingdom: Animalia
- Phylum: Arthropoda
- Clade: Pancrustacea
- Class: Insecta
- Order: Diptera
- Family: Tachinidae
- Subfamily: Phasiinae
- Tribe: Cylindromyiini
- Genus: Pygidimyia; Crosskey, 1967

Type species
- Pygidia rufolateralis Malloch, 1930

Synonyms
- Pygidia Malloch, 1930

Genus of flies

Pygidimyia is a genus of flies in the family Tachinidae.

== Species ==
- Pygidimyia rufolateralis (Malloch, 1930)

== Distribution ==
The genus is found in Australia.
