= Phasiocyptera =

Scientific classification
- Kingdom: Animalia
- Phylum: Arthropoda
- Class: Insecta
- Order: Diptera
- Family: Tachinidae
- Subfamily: Phasiinae
- Tribe: Cylindromyiini
- Genus: Phasiocyptera; Townsend, 1927

Type species
- Phasiocyptera punctata Townsend, 1927

Genus of flies

Phasiocyptera is a genus of flies in the family Tachinidae.

== Species ==
- Phasiocyptera punctata Townsend, 1927

== Distribution ==
Brazil.
