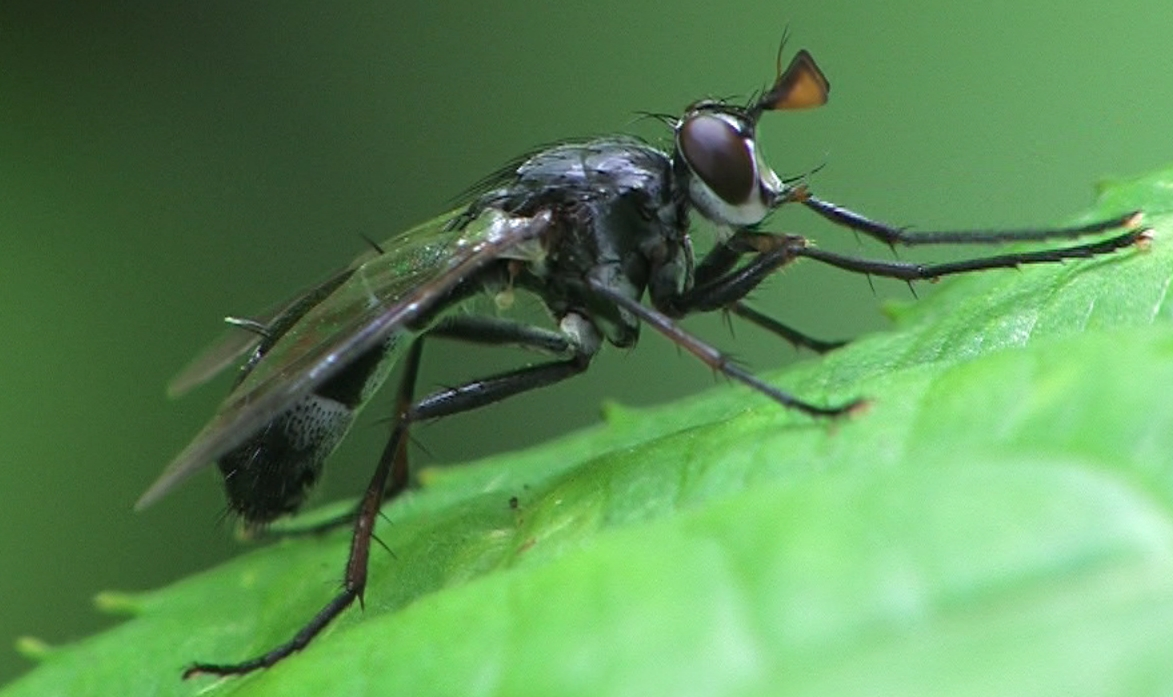
- Lophosia fasciata

Scientific classification
- Kingdom: Animalia
- Phylum: Arthropoda
- Class: Insecta
- Order: Diptera
- Family: Tachinidae
- Subfamily: Phasiinae
- Tribe: Cylindromyiini
- Genus: Lophosia; Meigen, 1824

Type species
- Lophosia fasciata Meigen, 1824

Synonyms
- Cyrtocera Agassiz, 1846; Duvaucelia Robineau-Desvoidy, 1830; Eocypterula Townsend, 1926; Eupalpocyptera Townsend, 1927; Formosolophosia Townsend, 1927; Lophosiocyptera Townsend, 1927; Lophosiodes Townsend, 1927; Lophosiopsis Townsend, 1928; Macrolophosia Brauer & von Berganstamm, 1893; Neoduvaucelia Malloch, 1931; Palpocyptera Townsend, 1927; Paralophosia Brauer & von Berganstamm, 1889; Perilophosia Villeneuve, 1927; Philippolophosia Townsend, 1928; Pseudocyptera Brauer & von Berganstamm, 1893; Stylogynemyia Townsend, 1927; Xenolophosia Villeneuve, 1926; Zambesoides Townsend, 1927

= Lophosia =

Genus of flies

Lophosia is a genus of flies in the family Tachinidae.

== Species ==
- Lophosia aenescens (Malloch, 1931)
- Lophosia angusticauda (Townsend, 1927)
- Lophosia atra (Townsend, 1926)
- Lophosia bicincta (Robineau-Desvoidy, 1830)
- Lophosia caudalis Sun, 1996
- Lophosia costalis (Townsend, 1928)
- Lophosia epalpata (Townsend, 1927)
- Lophosia erythropa (Bezzi, 1925)
- Lophosia excisa Tothill, 1918
- Lophosia exquisita (Malloch, 1931)
- Lophosia fasciata Meigen, 1824
- Lophosia felderi (Brauer & von Berganstamm, 1893)
- Lophosia flavicornis Sun, 1996
- Lophosia hamulata (Villeneuve, 1926)
- Lophosia imbecilla Herting, 1983
- Lophosia imbuta (Wiedemann, 1819)
- Lophosia jiangxiensis Sun, 1996
- Lophosia lophosioides (Townsend, 1927)
- Lophosia macropyga Herting, 1983
- Lophosia marginata Sun, 1996
- Lophosia obscura (Brauer & von Berganstamm, 1893)
- Lophosia ocypterina (Villeneuve, 1927)
- Lophosia perpendicularis (Villeneuve, 1927)
- Lophosia pulchra (Townsend, 1927)
- Lophosia scutellata Sun, 1996
- Lophosia tianmushanica Sun, 1996
