= Carphochaete durangensis =

Scientific classification
- Kingdom: Plantae
- Clade: Tracheophytes
- Clade: Angiosperms
- Clade: Eudicots
- Clade: Asterids
- Order: Asterales
- Family: Asteraceae
- Genus: Carphochaete
- Species: C. durangensis

Binomial name
- Carphochaete durangensis Grashoff ex B.L.Turner

Species of flowering plant

Carphochaete durangensis is a species of Mexican flowering plants in the family Asteraceae. They are native to Durango in north-western Mexico.
