= Sepseocara =

Scientific classification
- Kingdom: Animalia
- Phylum: Arthropoda
- Class: Insecta
- Order: Diptera
- Family: Tachinidae
- Subfamily: Phasiinae
- Tribe: Cylindromyiini
- Genus: Sepseocara; Richter, 1986

Type species
- Sepseocara itians Richter, 1986

Genus of flies

Sepseocara is a genus of flies in the family Tachinidae.

== Species ==
- Sepseocara itians Richter, 1986

== Distribution ==
Russia.
