= Australotachina =

Scientific classification
- Kingdom: Animalia
- Phylum: Arthropoda
- Clade: Pancrustacea
- Class: Insecta
- Order: Diptera
- Family: Tachinidae
- Subfamily: Phasiinae
- Tribe: Cylindromyiini
- Genus: Australotachina; Curran, 1938

Type species
- Australotachina calliphoroides Curran, 1938

Genus of flies

Australotachina is a genus of flies in the family Tachinidae.

== Species ==
- Australotachina calliphoroides Curran, 1938

== Distribution ==
Australia.
