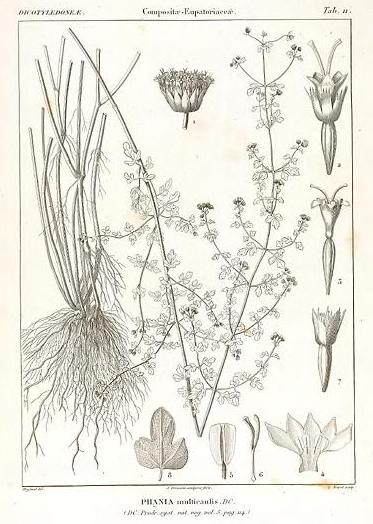
- Phania matricarioides as Phania multicaulis in Delessert

Scientific classification
- Kingdom: Plantae
- Clade: Tracheophytes
- Clade: Angiosperms
- Clade: Eudicots
- Clade: Asterids
- Order: Asterales
- Family: Asteraceae
- Subfamily: Asteroideae
- Tribe: Eupatorieae
- Genus: Phania; DC.

Type species
- Phania multicaulis DC.

= Phania (plant) =

Genus of flowering plants

Phania is a genus of plants in the tribe Eupatorieae within the family Asteraceae.

Species

- Phania cajalbanica Borhidi & O.Muñiz - Cuba
- Phania curtissii B.L.Rob. - Cuba
- Phania domingensis (Spreng.) Griseb. - Dominican Republic
- Phania matricarioides (Spreng.) Griseb. - Cuba
- Phania multicaulis DC. - Cuba
- Phania trinervia DC. - Mexico

formerly included

see Hofmeisteria Oxylobus

- Phania arbutifolia (Kunth) DC. - Oxylobus arbutifolius (Kunth) A.Gray
- Phania dissecta Hook. & Arn. - Hofmeisteria dissecta (Hook. & Arn.) R.M.King & H.Rob.
- Phania urenifolia Hook. & Arn. - Hofmeisteria urenifolia (Hook. & Arn.) Walp.
