= Polybiocyptera =

Scientific classification
- Kingdom: Animalia
- Phylum: Arthropoda
- Class: Insecta
- Order: Diptera
- Family: Tachinidae
- Subfamily: Phasiinae
- Tribe: Cylindromyiini
- Genus: Polybiocyptera; Guimarães, 1979

Type species
- Polybiocyptera plaumanni Guimarães, 1979

Genus of flies

Polybiocyptera is a genus of flies in the family Tachinidae.

== Species ==
- Polybiocyptera plaumanni Guimarães, 1979

== Distribution ==
Brazil.
