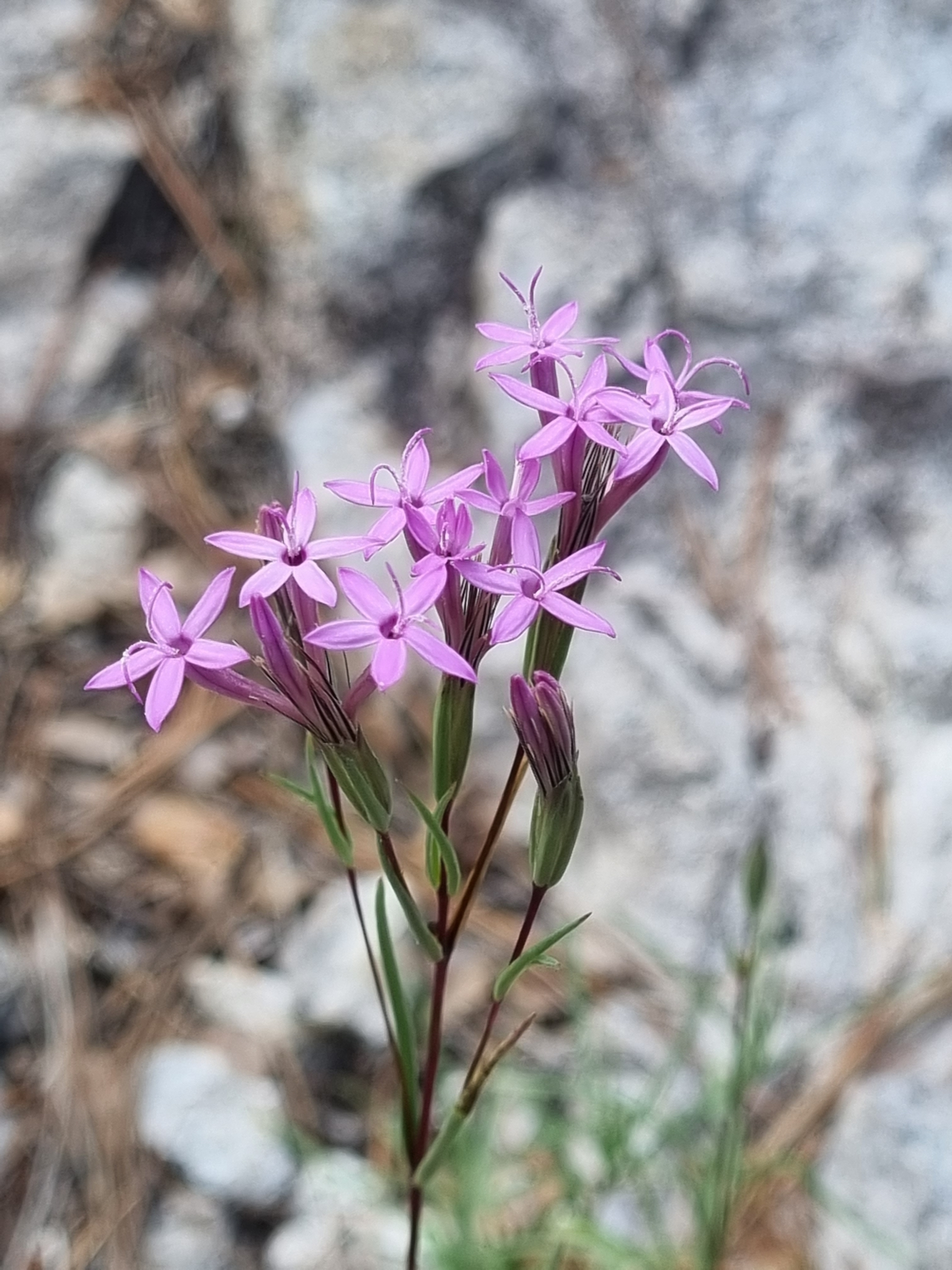

Scientific classification
- Kingdom: Plantae
- Clade: Tracheophytes
- Clade: Angiosperms
- Clade: Eudicots
- Clade: Asterids
- Order: Asterales
- Family: Asteraceae
- Genus: Carphochaete
- Species: C. wislizeni

Binomial name
- Carphochaete wislizeni A.Gray

= Carphochaete wislizeni =

Species of flowering plant

Carphochaete wislizeni is a species of Mexican flowering plants in the family Asteraceae. They are native to Chihuahua, Sonora, and Durango in northern Mexico.
