= Mesniletta =

Scientific classification
- Kingdom: Animalia
- Phylum: Arthropoda
- Class: Insecta
- Order: Diptera
- Family: Tachinidae
- Subfamily: Phasiinae
- Tribe: Cylindromyiini
- Genus: Mesniletta; Herting, 1979

Type species
- Gymnosoma (Stylogymnomyia) ventricosum Meijere, 1917

Genus of flies

Mesniletta is a genus of flies in the family Tachinidae.

== Species ==
- Mesniletta ventricosum (Meijere, 1917)

== Distribution ==
Java.
