= Oxylobus (beetle) =

Scientific classification
- Kingdom: Animalia
- Phylum: Arthropoda
- Class: Insecta
- Order: Coleoptera
- Suborder: Adephaga
- Family: Carabidae
- Subfamily: Scaritinae
- Genus: Oxylobus; Chaudoir, 1855

Genus of beetles

Oxylobus is a genus of beetles in the family Carabidae, containing the following species:

- Oxylobus alternans Andrewes, 1929
- Oxylobus alveolatus Chaudoir, 1879
- Oxylobus armatus Andrewes, 1929
- Oxylobus asperulus Chaudoir, 1857
- Oxylobus bipunctatus Andrewes, 1929
- Oxylobus dekkanus Andrewes, 1929
- Oxylobus dentatus Andrewes, 1929
- Oxylobus dispar Andrewes, 1929
- Oxylobus dissors Tschitscherine, 1894
- Oxylobus exiguus Andrewes, 1933
- Oxylobus follis Andrewes, 1929
- Oxylobus foveiger Chaudoir, 1879
- Oxylobus inaequalis Andrewes, 1929
- Oxylobus ingens Andrewes, 1929
- Oxylobus lateralis (Dejean, 1825)
- Oxylobus lirifer Andrewes, 1929
- Oxylobus mahratta Andrewes, 1929
- Oxylobus meridionalis H. W. Bates, 1891
- Oxylobus montanus Andrewes, 1929
- Oxylobus nanus Andrewes, 1929
- Oxylobus ovalipennis Andrewes, 1929
- Oxylobus porcatus (Fabricius, 1798)
- Oxylobus punctatosulcatus Chaudoir, 1855
- Oxylobus pygmaeus Andrewes, 1929
- Oxylobus quadricollis Chaudoir, 1855
- Oxylobus rugatus Bänninger, 1928
- Oxylobus rugiceps Andrewes, 1929
- Oxylobus sculptilis (Westwood, 1845)
- Oxylobus silenticus S. K. Saha, 1989
