= Cronquistia =

Scientific classification
- Kingdom: Plantae
- Clade: Tracheophytes
- Clade: Angiosperms
- Clade: Eudicots
- Clade: Asterids
- Order: Asterales
- Family: Asteraceae
- Subfamily: Asteroideae
- Tribe: Eupatorieae
- Genus: Cronquistia; R.M.King
- Species: C. pringlei

Binomial name
- Cronquistia pringlei (S.Watson) R.M.King

Synonyms
- Stevia simulans B.L.Rob.; Carphochaete pringlei (S.Watson) Grashoff ex B.L.Turner; Carphochaete pringlei var. simulans (B.L.Rob.) B.L.Turner

Genus of flowering plants

Cronquistia is a genus of flowering plants in the daisy family, Asteraceae.

It contains only one known species, Cronquistia pringlei, endemic to Mexico (States of Chihuahua and Durango).
