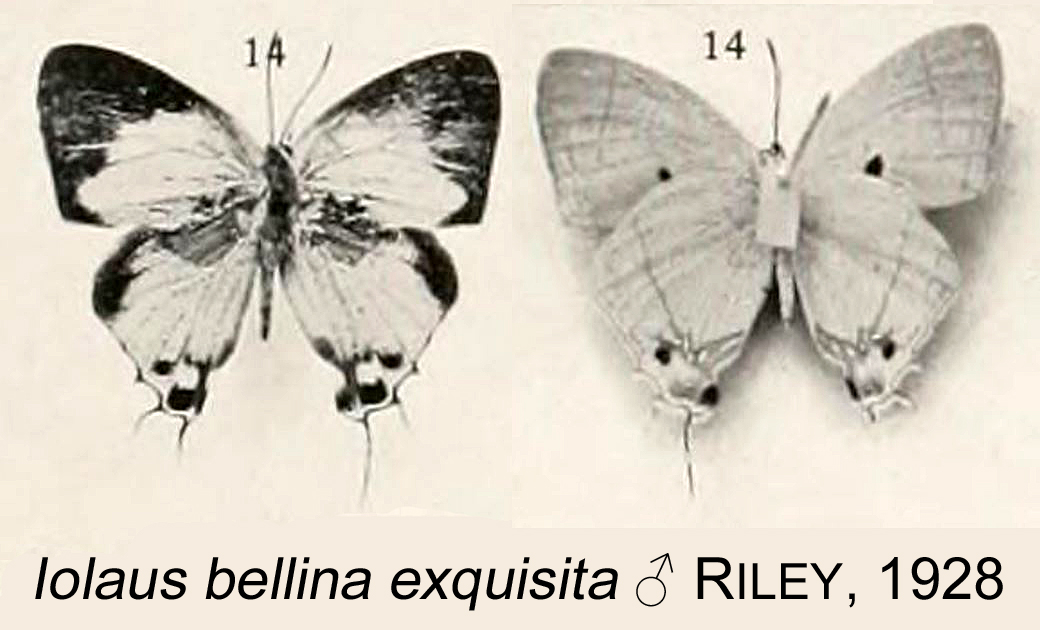

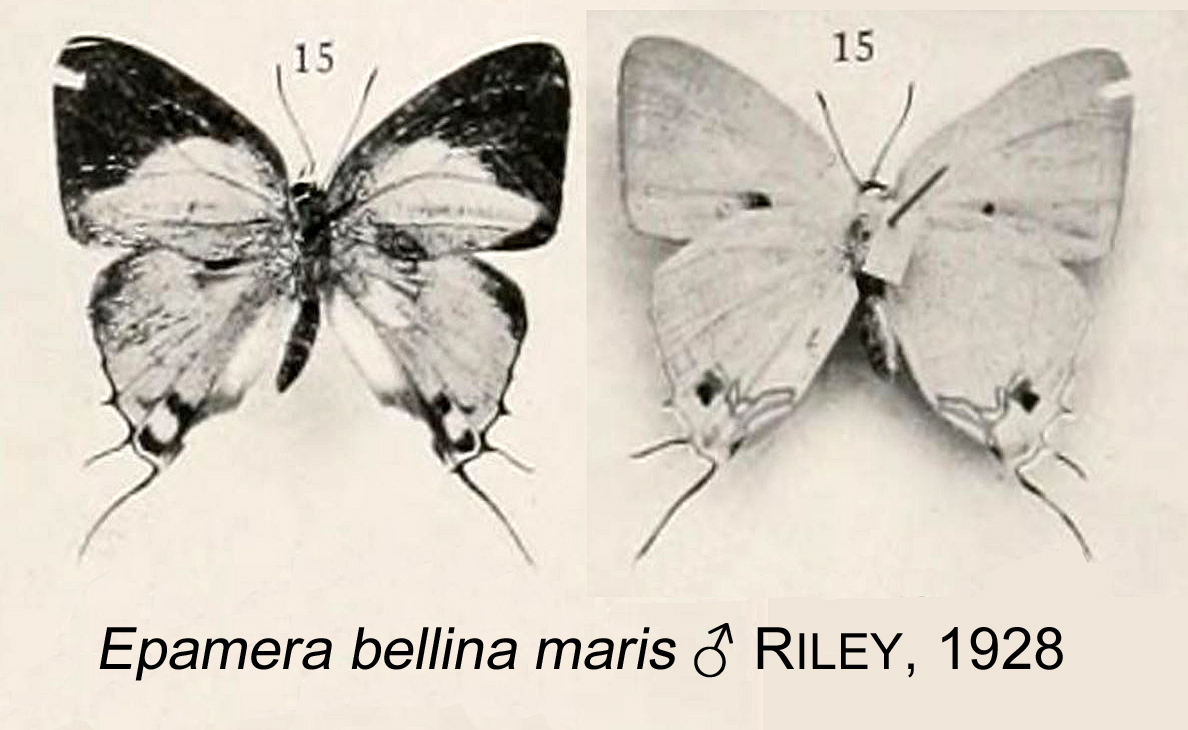

Scientific classification
- Kingdom: Animalia
- Phylum: Arthropoda
- Class: Insecta
- Order: Lepidoptera
- Family: Lycaenidae
- Genus: Iolaus
- Species: I. bellina

Binomial name
- Iolaus bellina (Plötz, 1880)

Synonyms
- Hypolycaena bellina Plötz, 1880; Iolaus (Epamera) bellina; Iolaus iaspis Druce, 1890; Epamera bellina exquisita Riley, 1928; Epamera bellina maris Riley, 1928

= Iolaus bellina =

Species of butterfly

Iolaus bellina, the white-spot sapphire, is a butterfly in the family Lycaenidae. It is found in Sierra Leone, Liberia, Ivory Coast, Ghana, Togo, Nigeria, Cameroon, São Tomé and Príncipe, Gabon, the Republic of the Congo, the Democratic Republic of the Congo, Uganda, Kenya and Tanzania. The habitat consists of forests.

Adults of both sexes have been observed feeding from flowers.

The larvae feed on Loranthus species.

== Subspecies ==
- Iolaus bellina bellina (Sierra Leone, Liberia, Ivory Coast, Ghana, Togo, Nigeria: south and the Cross River loop, western Cameroon)
- Iolaus bellina exquisita (Riley, 1928) (southern Cameroon, Gabon, Congo, Democratic Republic of the Congo, Uganda, western Kenya, north-western Tanzania)
- Iolaus bellina maris (Riley, 1928) (São Tomé)
