= Bellina =

Scientific classification
- Kingdom: Animalia
- Phylum: Arthropoda
- Clade: Pancrustacea
- Class: Insecta
- Order: Diptera
- Family: Tachinidae
- Subfamily: Phasiinae
- Tribe: Cylindromyiini
- Genus: Bellina; Robineau-Desvoidy, 1863

Type species
- Bellina melanura Robineau-Desvoidy, 1863

Genus of flies

Bellina is a genus of flies in the family Tachinidae.

== Species ==
- Bellina melanura Robineau-Desvoidy, 1863

== Distribution ==
India.
