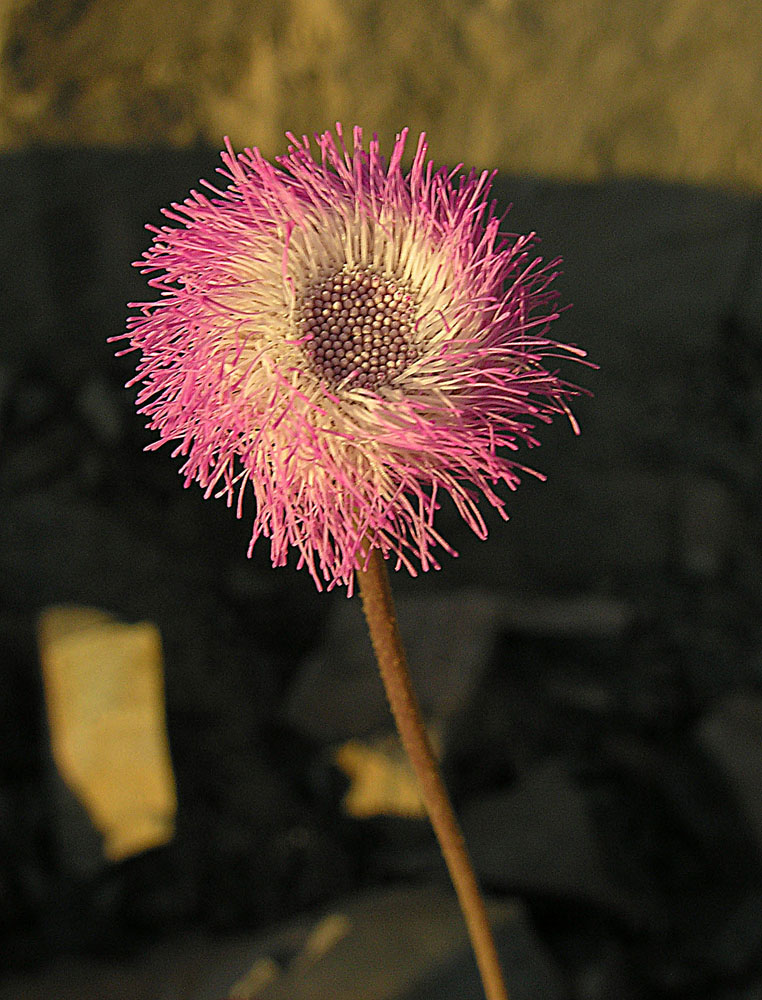
- Hofmeisteria fasciculata

Scientific classification
- Kingdom: Plantae
- Clade: Tracheophytes
- Clade: Angiosperms
- Clade: Eudicots
- Clade: Asterids
- Order: Asterales
- Family: Asteraceae
- Subfamily: Asteroideae
- Tribe: Eupatorieae
- Genus: Hofmeisteria; Walp.

Type species
- Helogyne fasciculata (syn of H. fasciculata) Benth.

Synonyms
- Carterothamnus R.M.King; Podophania Baill.; Helogyne Benth. 1844, illegitimate homonym, not Nutt. 1841

= Hofmeisteria =

Genus of flowering plants

Hofmeisteria is a genus of Mexican flowering plants in the family Asteraceae.

Species

- Hofmeisteria crassifolia S.Watson - Sonora
- Hofmeisteria dissecta (Hook. & Arn.) R.M.King & H.Rob. - Jalisco, Colima, Guerrero, México State, Sinaloa, Nayarit
- Hofmeisteria fasciculata (Benth.) Walp. - Baja California, Baja California Sur, Sonora
- Hofmeisteria filifolia I.M.Johnst. - Baja California, Baja California Sur
- Hofmeisteria gayleana B.L.Turner - Durango, Sinaloa
- Hofmeisteria malvaefolia (B.L.Rob. & Greenm.) B.L.Turner - Oaxaca
- Hofmeisteria mexiae (B.L.Rob.) B.L.Turner - Jalisco, Nayarit
- Hofmeisteria schaffneri (A.Gray) R.M.King & H.Rob. - Guanajuato, Jalisco, San Luis Potosí
- Hofmeisteria sinaloensis Gentry - Sinaloa
- Hofmeisteria standleyi (S.F.Blake) R.M.King & H.Rob. - Sinaloa, Sonora
- Hofmeisteria urenifolia (Hook. & Arn.) Walp. - Chiapas, Oaxaca, Guerrero, Michoacán, Colima, Jalisco, Nayarit
