= Revealia =

Scientific classification
- Kingdom: Plantae
- Clade: Tracheophytes
- Clade: Angiosperms
- Clade: Eudicots
- Clade: Asterids
- Order: Asterales
- Family: Asteraceae
- Subfamily: Asteroideae
- Tribe: Eupatorieae
- Genus: Revealia; R.M.King & H.Rob.
- Species: R. macrocephala

Binomial name
- Revealia macrocephala (Paray) R.M.King & H.Rob.

Synonyms
- Oxylobus macrocephalus Paray; Carphochaete macrocephala (Paray) Grashoff ex B.L.Turner & K.M.Kerr; Revealia stevioides R.M.King & H.Rob. (type species)

Genus of plants

Revealia is a genus of Mexican plants in the tribe Eupatorieae within the family Asteraceae. The only known species is Revealia macrocephala, native to the Mexican State of Guerrero.

The genus is named for US botanist James L. Reveal.
