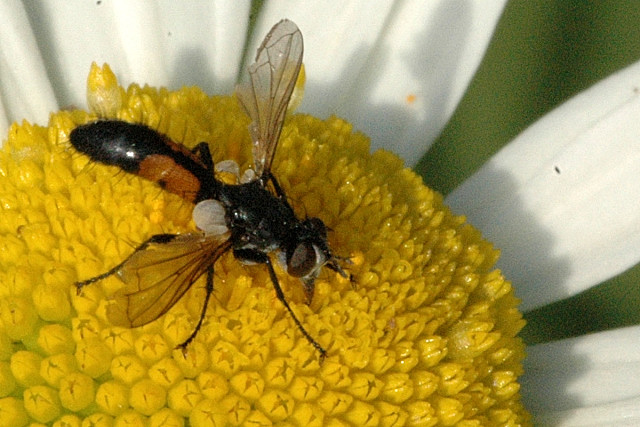
- Cylindromyia auriceps

Scientific classification
- Kingdom: Animalia
- Phylum: Arthropoda
- Class: Insecta
- Order: Diptera
- Family: Tachinidae
- Subfamily: Phasiinae
- Tribe: Cylindromyiini

= Cylindromyiini =

Tribe of flies

Cylindromyiini is a tribe of flies in the family Tachinidae. It contains about 17 genera and 200 species.

== Genera ==
Penthosia was formerly in this tribe, but is now a member of Hermyini.

- Australotachina Curran, 1834
- Bellina Robineau-Desvoidy, 1863
- Besseria Robineau-Desvoidy, 1830
- Catapariprosopa Townsend, 1927
- Cylindromyia Meigen, 1803
- Hemyda Robineau-Desvoidy, 1830
- Huttonobesseria Curran, 1927
- Lophosia Meigen, 1824
- Mesniletta Herting, 1979
- Neobrachelia Townsend, 1931
- Neolophosia Townsend, 1939
- Phania Meigen, 1824
- Phasiocyptera Townsend, 1927
- Polistiopsis Townsend, 1915
- Polybiocyptera Guimarães, 1979
- Pygidimyia Crosskey, 1967
- Sepseocara Richter, 1986
