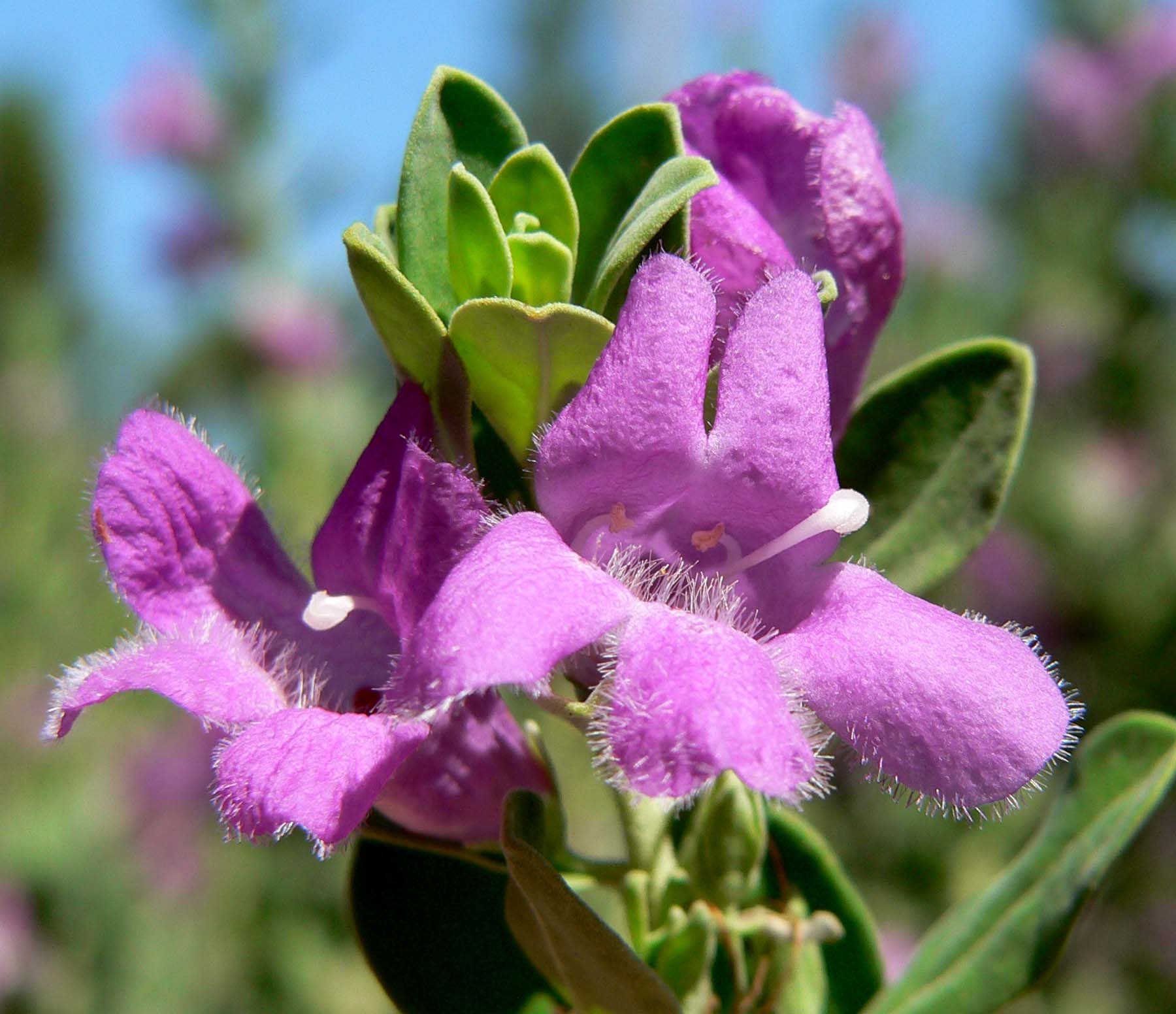
- Leucophyllum frutescens 'Green Cloud'

Scientific classification
- Kingdom: Plantae
- Clade: Embryophytes
- Clade: Tracheophytes
- Clade: Angiosperms
- Clade: Eudicots
- Clade: Asterids
- Order: Lamiales
- Family: Scrophulariaceae
- Tribe: Leucophylleae
- Genus: Leucophyllum; Humb. & Bonpl.

Species
- About 15 species, see text

Synonyms
- Terania Berland.

= Leucophyllum =

Genus of flowering plants in the figwort family

Leucophyllum (barometer bush or barometerbush) is a genus of evergreen shrubs in the figwort family, Scrophulariaceae, native to the southwestern United States and Mexico. It is sometimes placed in the family Myoporaceae. The dozen-odd species are often called "sages", although they have no relationship to the genus Salvia.

The solitary axillary flowers are bell- or funnel-shaped, with five lobes and two lips, and colors ranging from white to magenta to purple. The generic name is derived from the Greek words λευκός (leukos), meaning "white," and φυλλον (phyllos), meaning "leaf," referring to the trichome-covered foliage.

These shrubs are found in sandy soils and have a high salt tolerance. They have become popular for edge and area plantings in warmer areas and in xeriscaping; they require minimal water, are easily shaped into hedges, and bloom over their entire surface. Cultivars of L. frutescens, L. candidum, L. laevigatum, L. langmaniae, L. pruinosum, L. revolutum, and L. zygophyllum have been developed.

Leucophyllum shrubs are legendary for their ability to "forecast" rain, usually blooming several days prior to a rainstorm, apparently in response to humidity. They are sometimes called "barometer bush" for this reason. It is believed to be a survival trait in the plants' semi-desert habitats.

== Selected species ==
- Leucophyllum alejandrae G.L. Nesom
- Leucophyllum ambiguum Bonpl.
- Leucophyllum candidum I.M.Johnst. – Brewster County barometer bush
- Leucophyllum flyrii B.L. Turner
- Leucophyllum frutescens (Berland.) I.M.Johnst. – Texas sage, Texas ranger, silverleaf
- Leucophyllum hintoniorum G.L. Nesom
- Leucophyllum laevigatum Standl. – Chihuahuan sage
- Leucophyllum langmaniae Flyr – Langman's sage, Rio Bravo sage
- Leucophyllum minus A.Gray – Big Bend barometer bush
- Leucophyllum mojinense Henrickson & T. Van Devender
- Leucophyllum pringlei (Greenm.) Standl.
- Leucophyllum pruinosum I.M.Johnst.
- Leucophyllum revolutum Rzed.
- Leucophyllum ultramonticola Flyr
- Leucophyllum zygophyllum I.M.Johnst.

=== Hybrids ===
- Leucophyllum × 'Heavenly Cloud' (L. frutescens 'Green Cloud' × L. laevigatum)
- Leucophyllum × 'Rain Cloud' (L. frutescens × L. minus)
