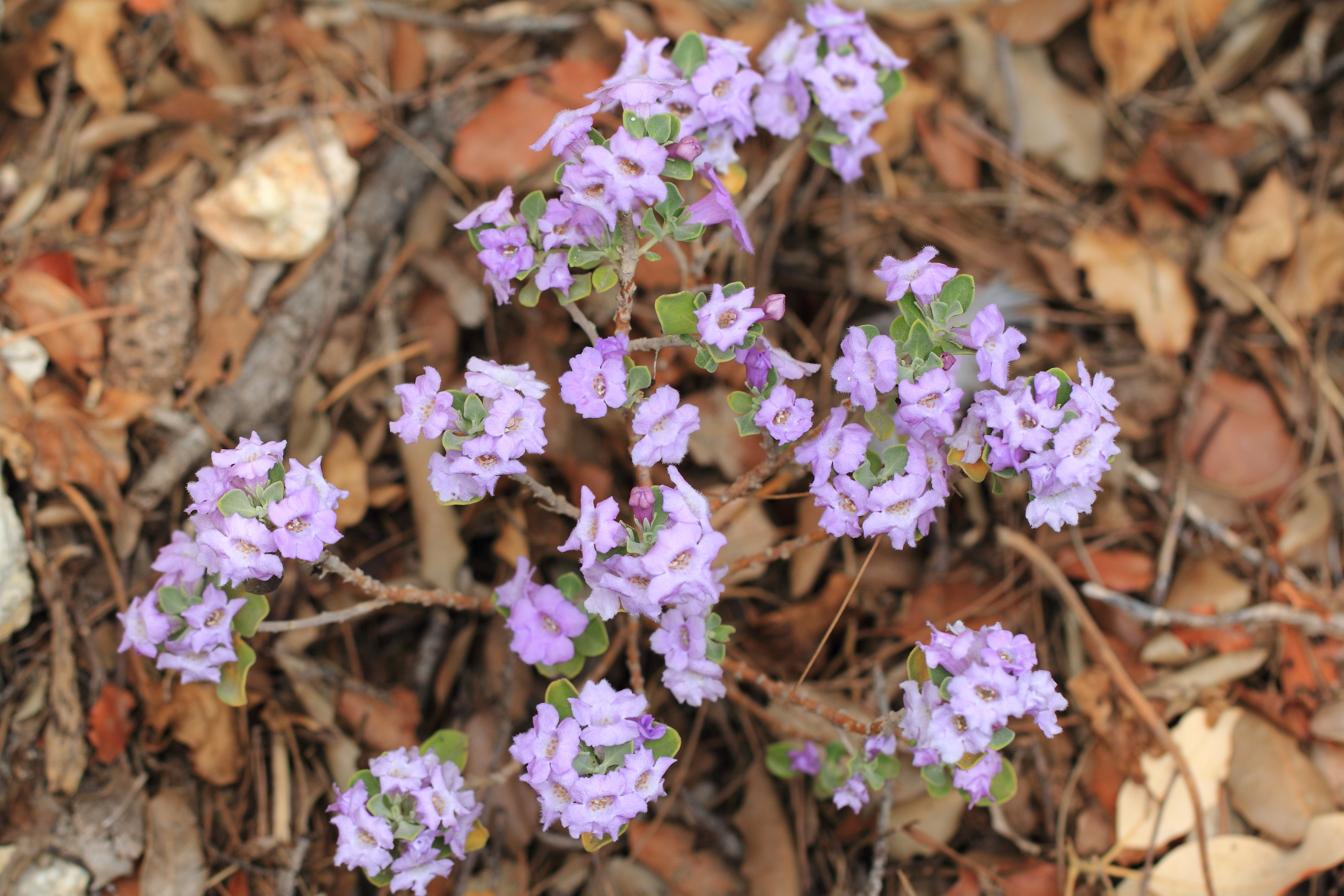
- Leucophyllum langmaniae in flower

Scientific classification
- Kingdom: Plantae
- Clade: Embryophytes
- Clade: Tracheophytes
- Clade: Angiosperms
- Clade: Eudicots
- Clade: Asterids
- Order: Lamiales
- Family: Scrophulariaceae
- Genus: Leucophyllum
- Species: L. langmaniae

Binomial name
- Leucophyllum langmaniae Flyr

= Leucophyllum langmaniae =

Species of flowering plant in the figwort family

Leucophyllum langmaniae is a shrub native of Mexico (Chihuahuan Desert), semi-evergreen, with gray-green leaves of velvety texture. Its shape is branched and compact, forming a rounded mass of up to 1 m (3 ft 3 in) high and wide. The flowers are lavender. They appear in the fall, and are even more abundant if drought or heat waves were important.

Leucophyllum langmaniae is called Langman's sage or Rio Bravo sage. However, it is not a true sage and it has no systematics relationship to the genus Salvia.

The specific epithet langmaniae was given in honor of Ida Kaplan Langman.
