= Myoporaceae =

Outdated family of flowering plants

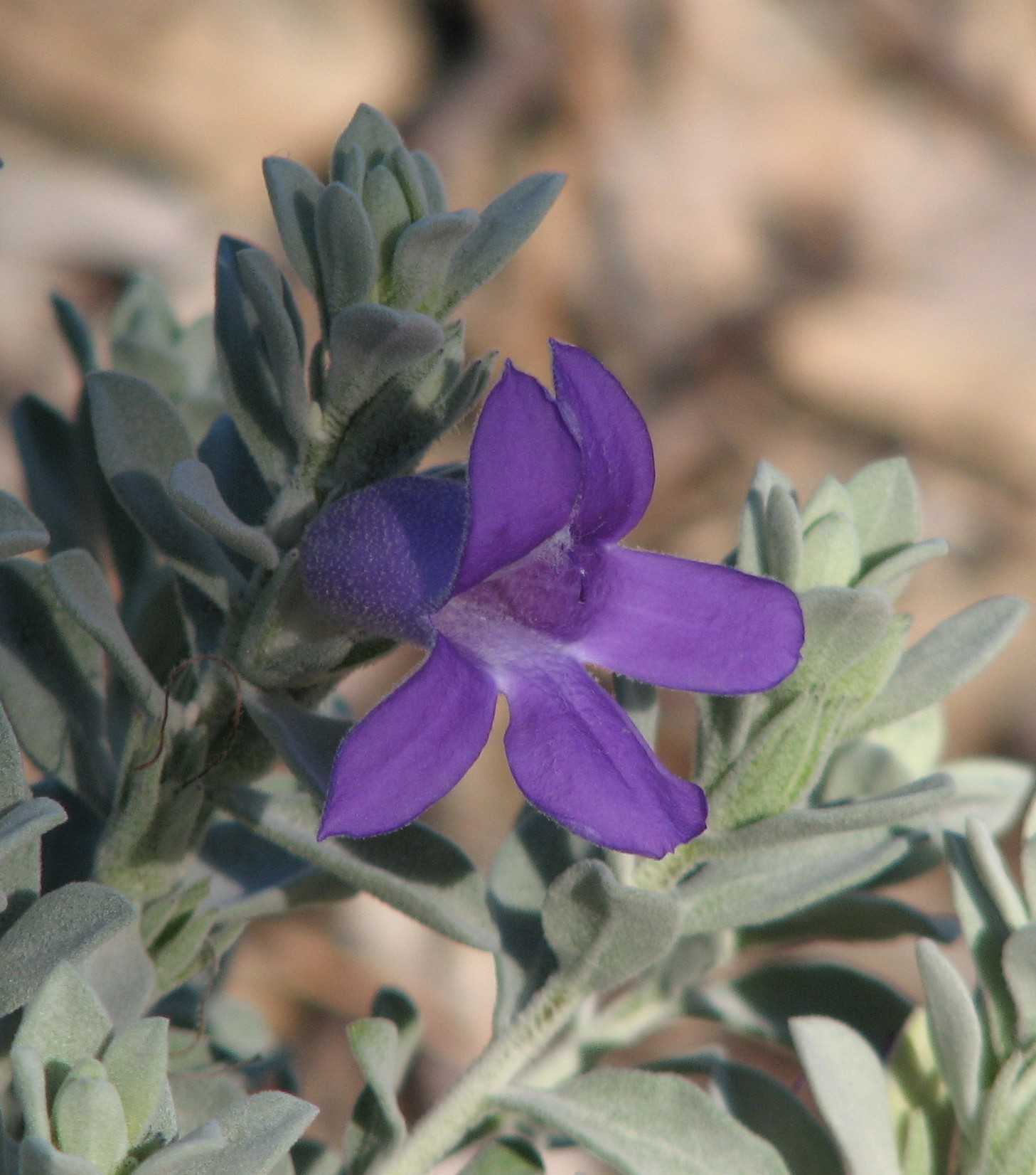
Eremophila hygrophana

Myoporaceae was a family of plants, found mostly in Australia, which included the following genera:

- Diocirea
- Eremophila, also known as emu bush
- Myoporum, also known as Boobiala

In the APG II system (continued in the APG III system), it is considered to be part of a fairly small family Scrophulariaceae, along with Buddleja and a variety of plants long classified in the Scrophulariaceae (such as Leucophyllum, North American shrubs which are the closest relatives to the former Myoporaceae.)
