= Flyriella parryi =

Scientific classification
- Kingdom: Plantae
- Clade: Tracheophytes
- Clade: Angiosperms
- Clade: Eudicots
- Clade: Asterids
- Order: Asterales
- Family: Asteraceae
- Genus: Flyriella
- Species: F. parryi

Binomial name
- Flyriella parryi (A.Gray) R.M.King & H.Rob. 1972

Synonyms
- Eupatorium parryi A. Gray 1959; Brickellia shineri M.E.Jones ex Flyr

Species of flowering plant

Flyriella parryi, the Chisos Mountain brickellbush, is a Mexican species of plants in the family Asteraceae. It is native to the states of Nuevo León, Coahuila, and Chihuahua in northern Mexico. It is the only species in its genus to have a natural range extending north of the international border, with a few populations on the Texas side of the Río Grande.

Flyriella parryi grows on rocky slopes, along streambanks, and in canyons. Its stem has many long, glandular hairs. Its leaves are egg-shaped, and up to 65 mm (2.6 in) long. One plant will produce numerous flower heads in a branching array. Each head has disc flowers, but no ray flowers.
