= Diocirea violacea =

Scientific classification
- Kingdom: Plantae
- Clade: Tracheophytes
- Clade: Angiosperms
- Clade: Eudicots
- Clade: Asterids
- Order: Lamiales
- Family: Scrophulariaceae
- Genus: Diocirea
- Species: D. violacea

Binomial name
- Diocirea violacea R.J.Chinnock

Species of flowering plant

Diocirea violacea is a plant in the figwort family (Scrophulariaceae), and is endemic to a small area near Salmon Gums in Western Australia. It is a low shrub with a restricted distribution but which often occurs in large numbers, forming a dense ground cover. It can be distinguished from the three others in its genus by a combination of the size and arrangement of its leaves and the appearance of its fruits.

== Description ==
Diocirea violacea is a shrub with many stems and which sometimes grows to a height of 0.5 metres (2 ft) and spreads to a width of about 1 metre (3 ft). Its branches often have many short hairs and glands producing a resin that dries white. The leaves are arranged spirally around the stems and are mostly 2.5–4.5 millimetres (0.1–0.2 in) long, about 0.7–1.6 millimetres (0.03–0.06 in) wide, glabrous and sticky due to the presence of resin.

The flowers are borne singly in leaf axils and lack a stalk. There are 5 egg-shaped, pointed green sepals with hairs on their edges. The five petals are joined to form a tube 1.5–2 millimetres (0.06–0.08 in) long with unequal lobes which are about 1.5–2.5 millimetres (0.06–0.1 in) long. The tube is white, spotted purple on the inside and on the bases of the lobes. The tube is mostly glabrous except for a few hairs on the lower lobes. There are 4 stamens which extend slightly beyond the petal tube. The fruit that follows flowering is a flattened oval shape, 2–3 millimetres (0.08–0.1 in) long with distinct ribs.

== Taxonomy and naming ==
Diocirea violacea was first formally described by taxonomist Bob Chinnock in Eremophila and allied genera: a monograph of the plant family Myoporaceae in 2007 from a specimen collected 26 kilometres (20 mi) south of Norseman. The specific epithet is derived from the "Latin violacea, violet, referring to the corolla colour".

== Distribution and habitat ==
Diocirea violacea has a restricted distribution in a small area between Salmon Gums and Spargoville in the Coolgardie and Mallee biogeographic regions where it often grows as the dominant species on sandy, gravelly or clay soils.

== Conservation ==
Diocirea violacea has been classified as "not threatened" by the Government of Western Australia Department of Parks and Wildlife.
