= Diocirea ternata =

Scientific classification
- Kingdom: Plantae
- Clade: Tracheophytes
- Clade: Angiosperms
- Clade: Eudicots
- Clade: Asterids
- Order: Lamiales
- Family: Scrophulariaceae
- Genus: Diocirea
- Species: D. ternata

Binomial name
- Diocirea ternata R.J.Chinnock

Species of flowering plant

Diocirea ternata is a plant in the figwort family, Scrophulariaceae and is endemic to a small area near Balladonia in Western Australia. It is a low shrub with a restricted distribution but which often occurs in large numbers, forming a dense ground cover. It is readily distinguished from the other three species in the genus by its unusual leaf arrangement.

== Description ==
Diocirea ternata is a shrub with many stems and which sometimes grows to a height of 0.8 metres (3 ft) and spreads to a width of 1.7 metres (6 ft). Its branches have many raised resin glands and the leaves are arranged in rings of three around the stems. The leaves are mostly 2.9–4.5 millimetres (0.1–0.2 in) long, about 1–2 millimetres (0.04–0.08 in) wide, egg-shaped tapering to a point and sticky due to the presence of resin.

The flowers are borne singly in leaf axils and lack a stalk. There are 5 egg-shaped, pointed green sepals with hairs on their edges. The petals are white, sometimes pale violet at first, and are joined to form a tube 2.5–3.0 millimetres (0.098–0.12 in) long with lobes which are about 1.5 millimetres (0.06 in) long. The lobes are spotted purple near the centre of the flower and the tube is mostly glabrous except for a few hairs on the lower lobe. There are 4 stamens which extend slightly beyond the petal tube. The fruit that follows flowering is a flattened oval shape, 2 by 1 millimetre (0.08 in × 0.04 in) with a crusty brown covering.

== Taxonomy and naming ==
Diocirea ternata was first formally described by taxonomist Bob Chinnock in Eremophila and allied genera: a monograph of the plant family Myoporaceae in 2007 from a specimen collected 70 kilometres (40 mi) west of Balladonia. The specific epithet is derived from "Latin ternata, in threes; referring to the whorled leaves".

== Distribution and habitat ==
Diocirea ternata has a restricted distribution in a small area near Balladonia in the Coolgardie biogeographic region where it grows in woodland on clay loam. Although the distribution is limited, in some places there is an almost continuous ground cover with thousands of individual plants.

== Conservation ==
Diocirea ternata has been classified as "not threatened" by the Government of Western Australia Department of Parks and Wildlife.
