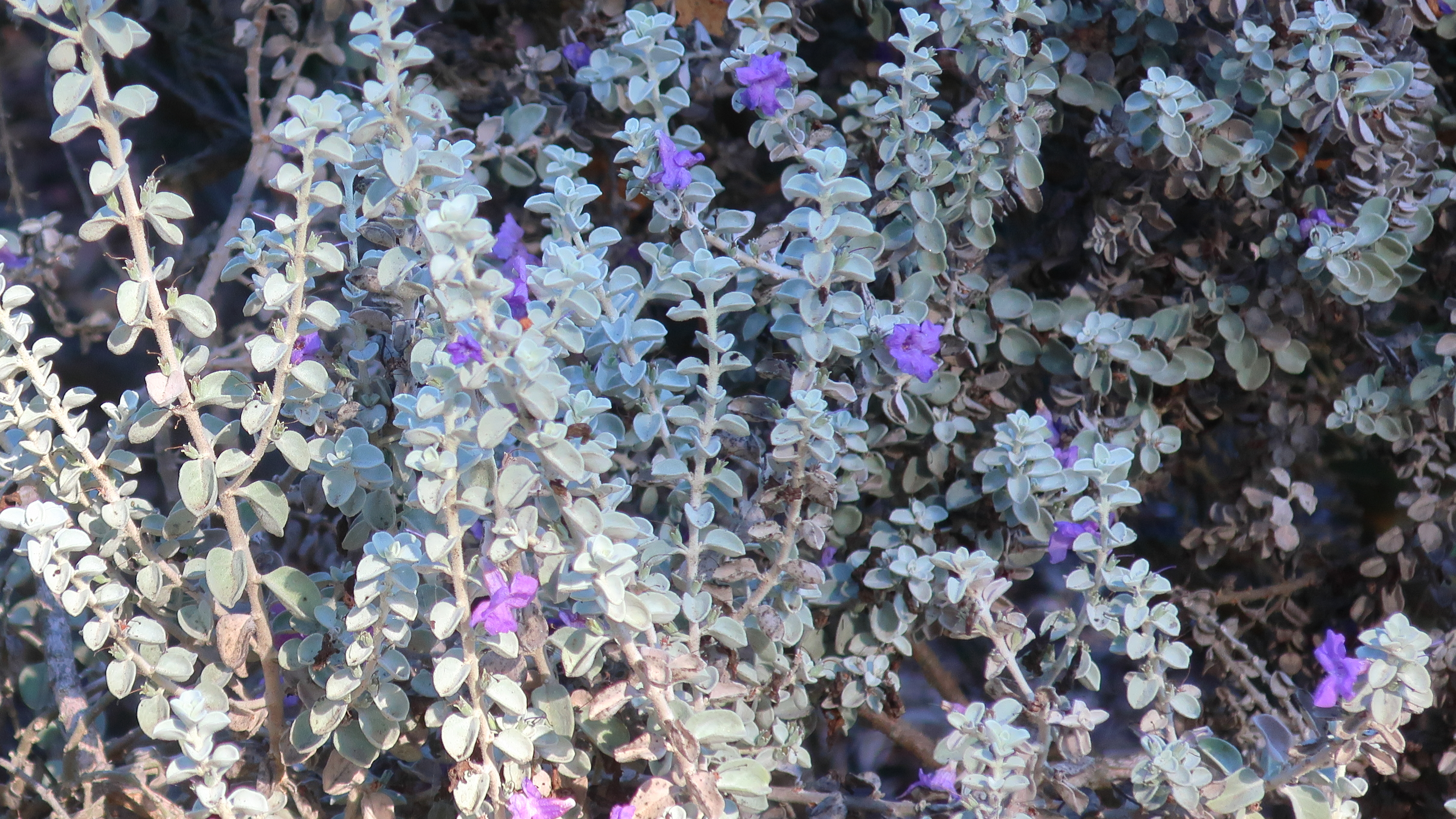
- 'Cimarron' cultivar
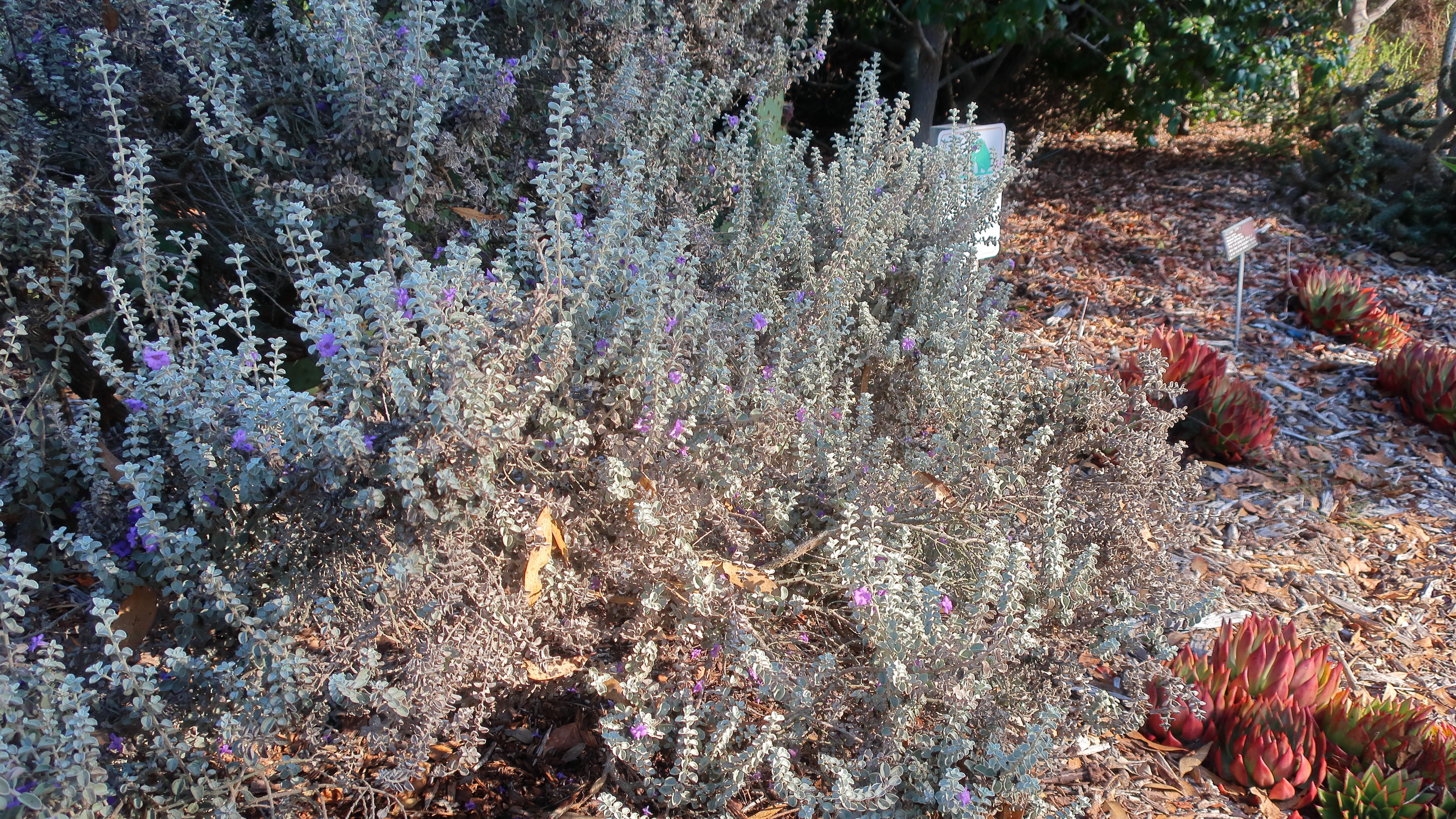
- At San Diego Botanic Garden

Scientific classification
- Kingdom: Plantae
- Clade: Tracheophytes
- Clade: Angiosperms
- Clade: Eudicots
- Clade: Asterids
- Order: Lamiales
- Family: Scrophulariaceae
- Genus: Leucophyllum
- Species: L. zygophyllum

Binomial name
- Leucophyllum zygophyllum I.M.Johnst.

= Leucophyllum zygophyllum =

Species of plant

Leucophyllum zygophyllum, the blue ranger or blue rain sage, is a species of flowering plant in the family Scrophulariaceae, native to northeastern Mexico. A shrub with attractive opposite foliage and a habit of flowering before rainstorms, it is recommended for xeriscaping. It is highly heat and drought tolerant, and is cold hardy to USDA zone 8a. There is a cultivar, 'Cimarron', which is somewhat dwarfed, reaching 3 ft (1 m).
