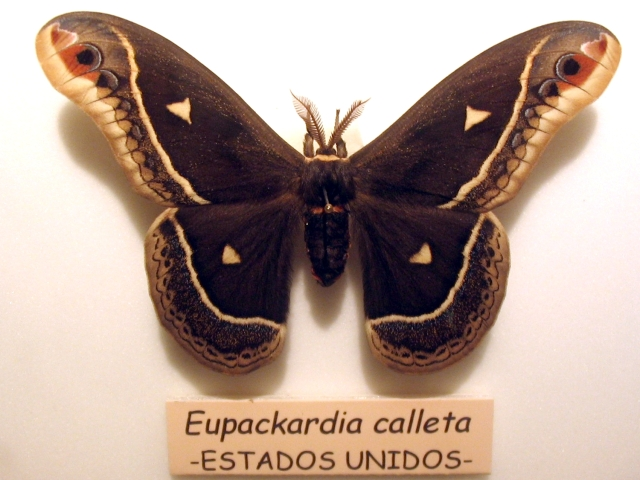

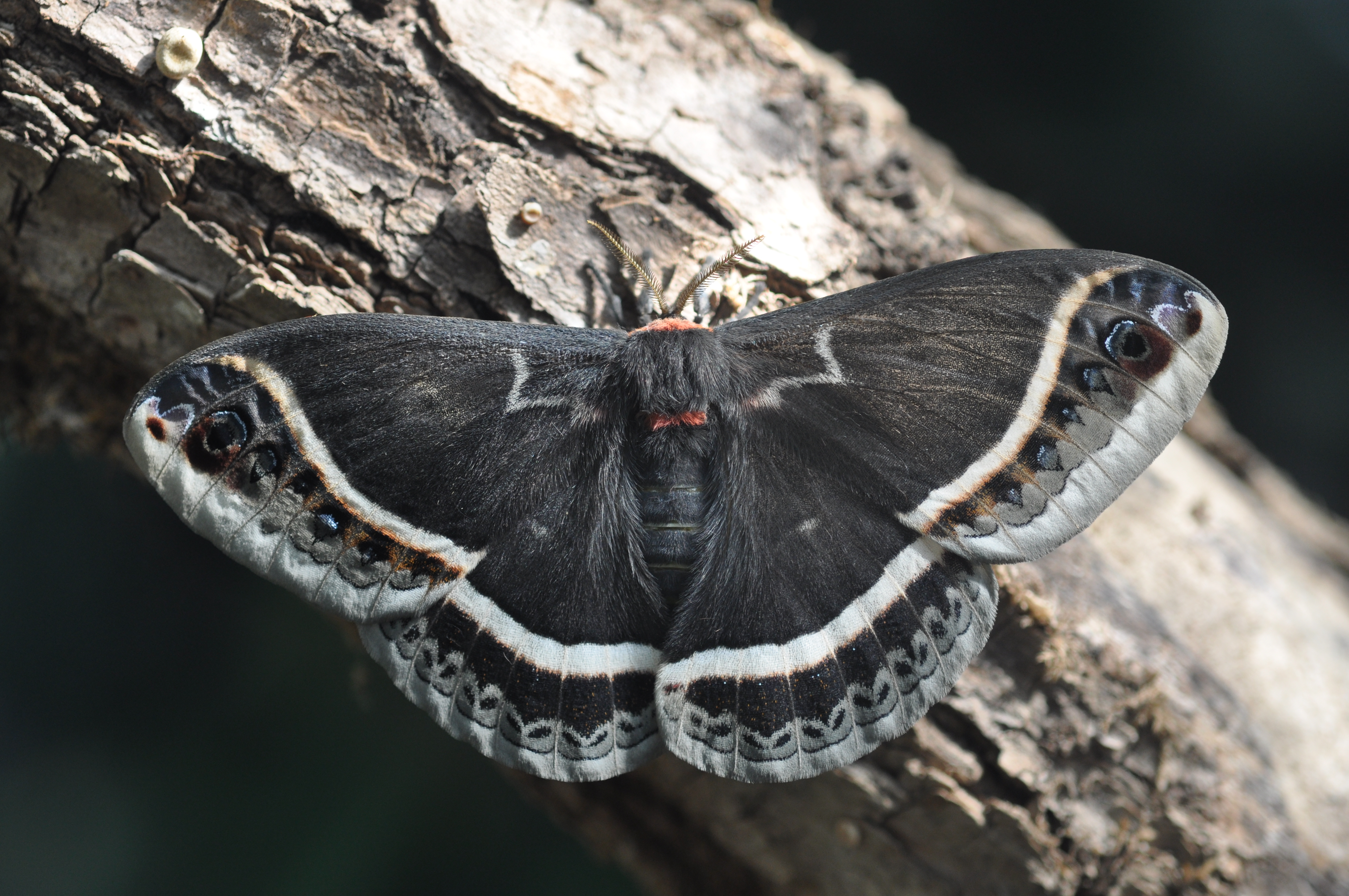

Scientific classification
- Kingdom: Animalia
- Phylum: Arthropoda
- Class: Insecta
- Order: Lepidoptera
- Family: Saturniidae
- Tribe: Attacini
- Genus: Eupackardia; Cockerell, 1912
- Species: E. calleta

Binomial name
- Eupackardia calleta (Westwood, 1853)

Synonyms
- Saturnia calleta; Platysamia polyommata; Eupackardia semicaeca; Eupackardia caeca; Eupackardia digueti; Samia calleta

= Eupackardia =

Genus of moths

Eupackardia is a monotypic moth genus in the family Saturniidae erected by Theodore Dru Alison Cockerell in 1912. Its only species, Eupackardia calleta, the calleta silkmoth, was described by John O. Westwood in 1853. It is found in Mexico, Guatemala, as well as in the states such as; Arizona, New Mexico, and Texas.

The wingspan is normally 8–11 cm (3.1–4.3 in), however, some specimens have been reported to exceed 5 inches.

The larvae mainly feed on Fraxinus species, Leucophyllum frutescens, Sapium biloculare and Fouquieria splendens.

== Description ==
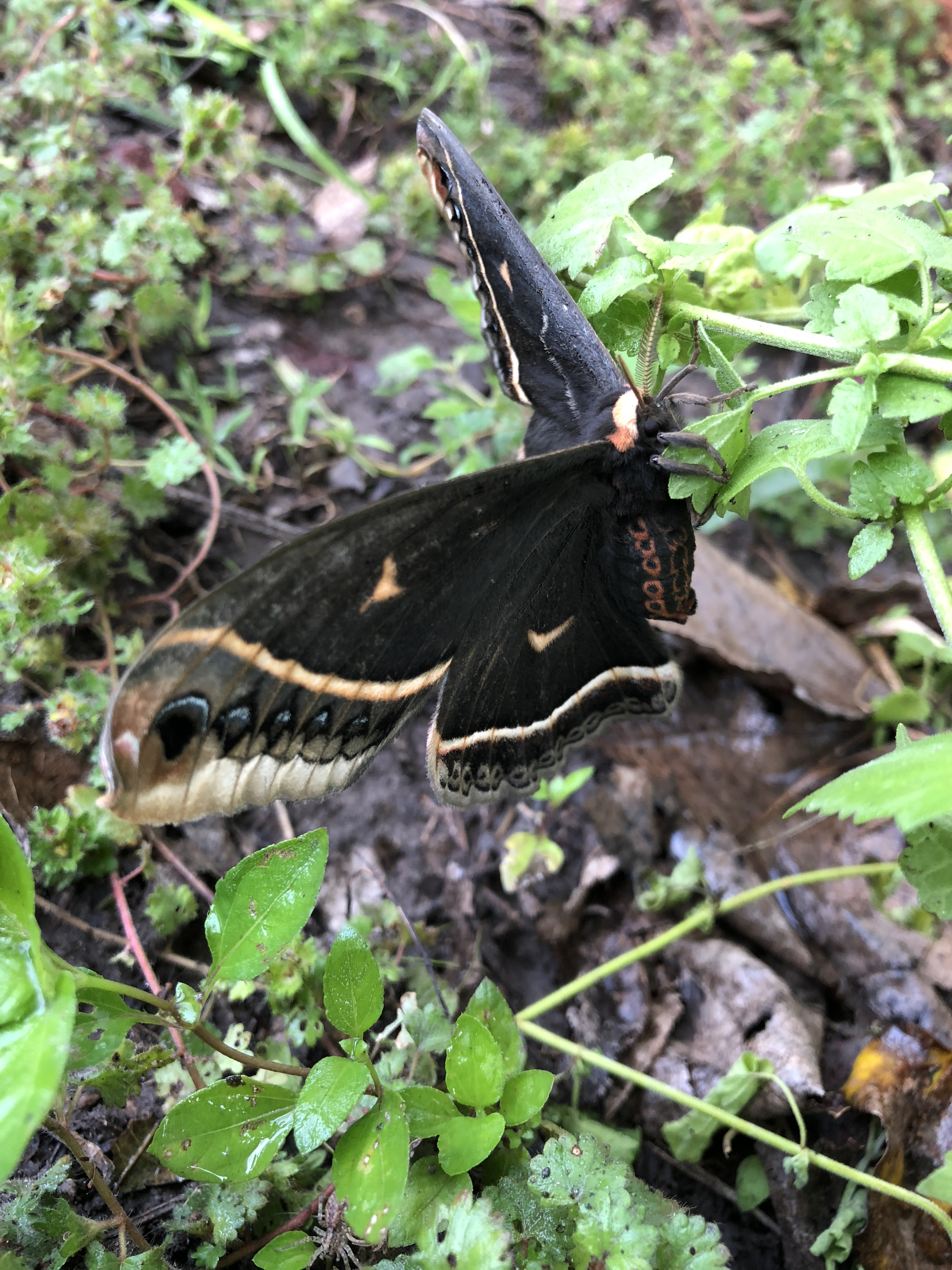
Female E. calleta, underside.

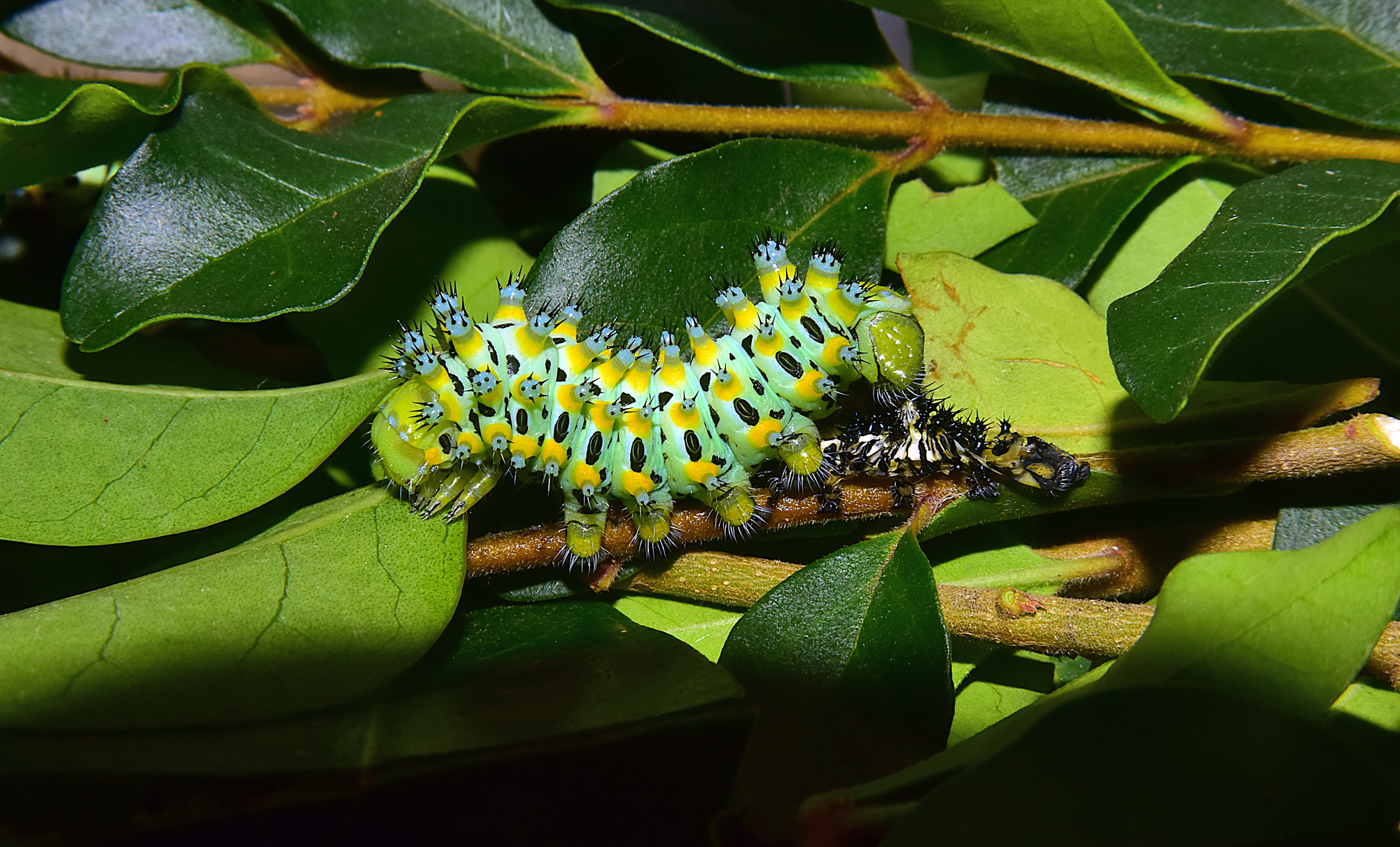
Eupackardia calleta larvae

The adult calleta silkmoth has a black body with a red collar and red on the back of the thorax. The wings, which normally span 8-11 centimetres, are black with conspicuous white post-median lines which happen to be wider in females. They can also have large triangular white spots on their wings however, some may not.

Caterpillars or larvae are normally bright green in colour with white stripes as well as have black scoli sets (spike-like projections) with blue and orange bases, though these colours may vary.

These larvae are normally very brightly coloured because they contain biogenetic chemicals that help to repel predators.

== Life cycle ==
Adult E. calleta emerge in the evening and may be mating as early as 7:30 am the next morning. Males are diurnal while females are nocturnal. Females lay eggs starting at dusk of the same day and the eggs are deposited in clumps on surfaces of host plant leaves. Caterpillars spray a defensive secretion from their integumental glands. Young caterpillars, typically the 1st to 3rd larval stages, feed gregariously, while the older caterpillars of the 4th and 5th larval stages are usually solitary feeders.

Cocoons are normally spun near the ground and in the shade and is attached to a twig by a short silken loop.

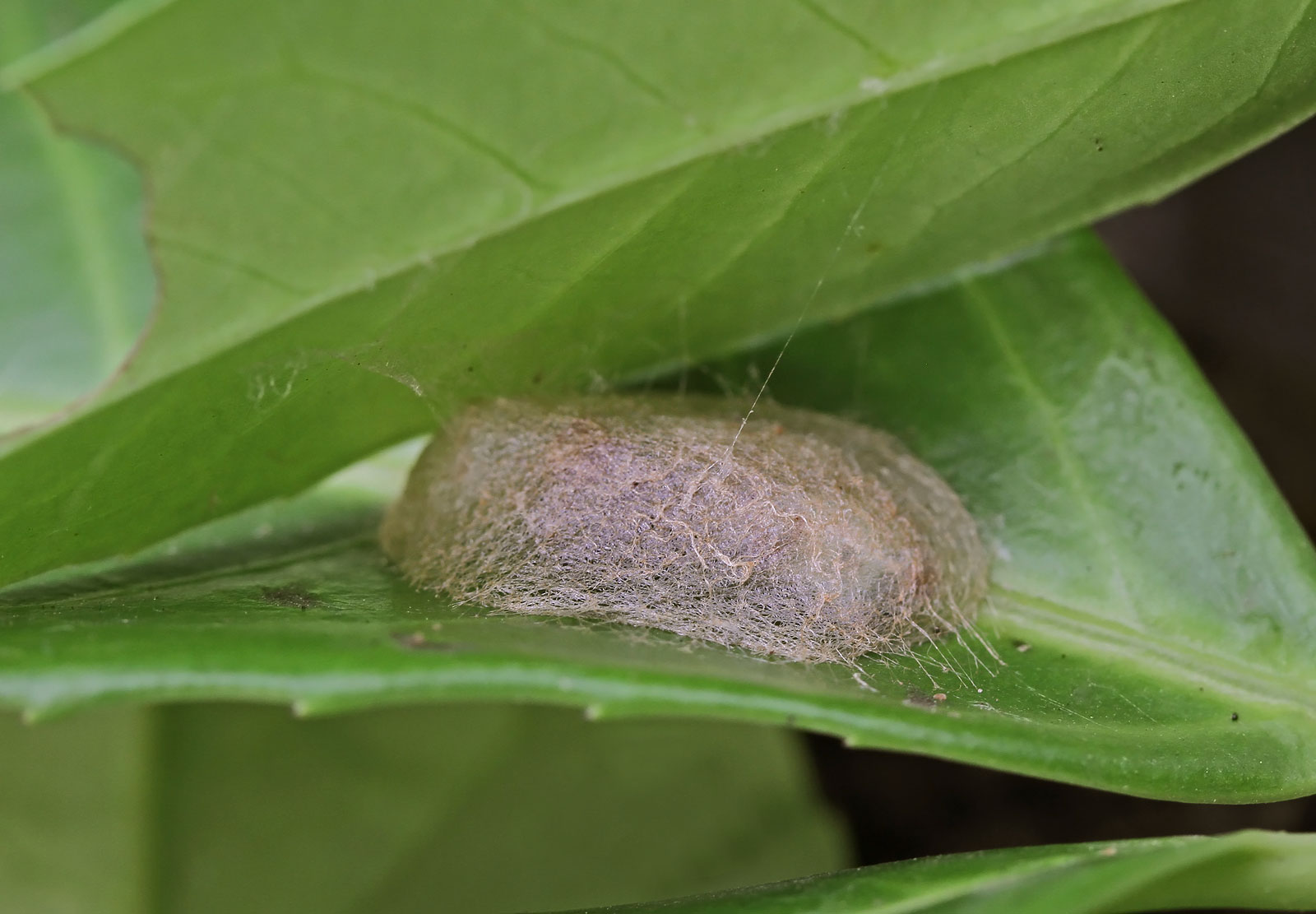
Example of an almost complete cocoon

== Diet ==
Eupackardia calleta caterpillars feed on ceniza (Leucophyllum frutescens), ash (Fraxinus), Mexican jumping bean (Sapium biloculare) and ocotillo (Fouquieria splendens), while adults do not feed at all.

Mexican jumping beans, one of the food items of E. calleta caterpillars

== Habitat, season and distribution ==
Eupackardia calleta ranges across southern Texas, Mexico, Guatemala, Arizona, and New Mexico. In the southeastern mountains of Arizona they are mostly seen from July to August. In central Arizona to Mexico they are seen from October to January, and in South Texas they are seen from September to November as well as March to April.

They normally make their habitats in thorn scrubs, foothills and canyons of desert mountain ranges and dry deserts.

== Threats ==
=== Predators ===
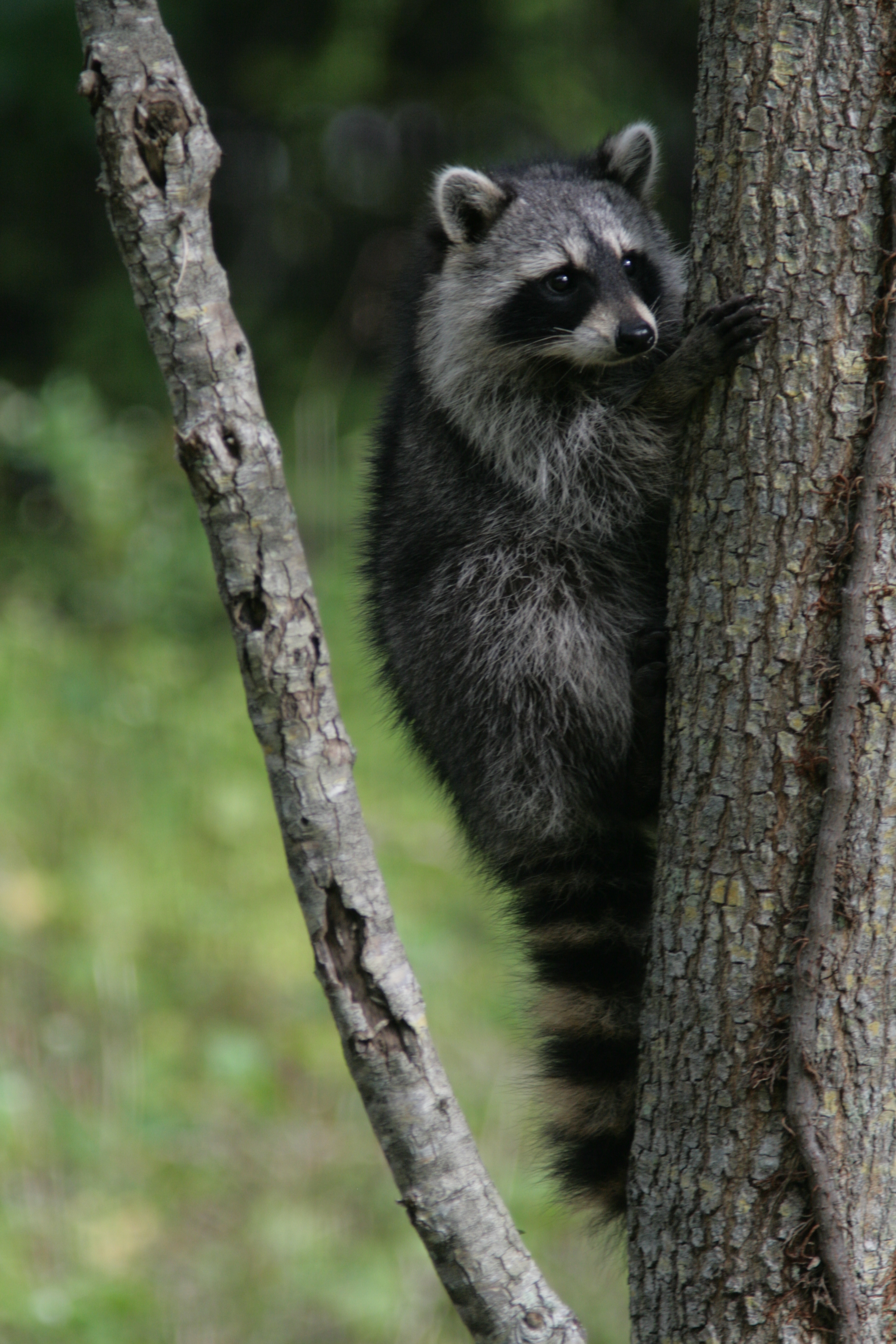
A common predator of E. calleta

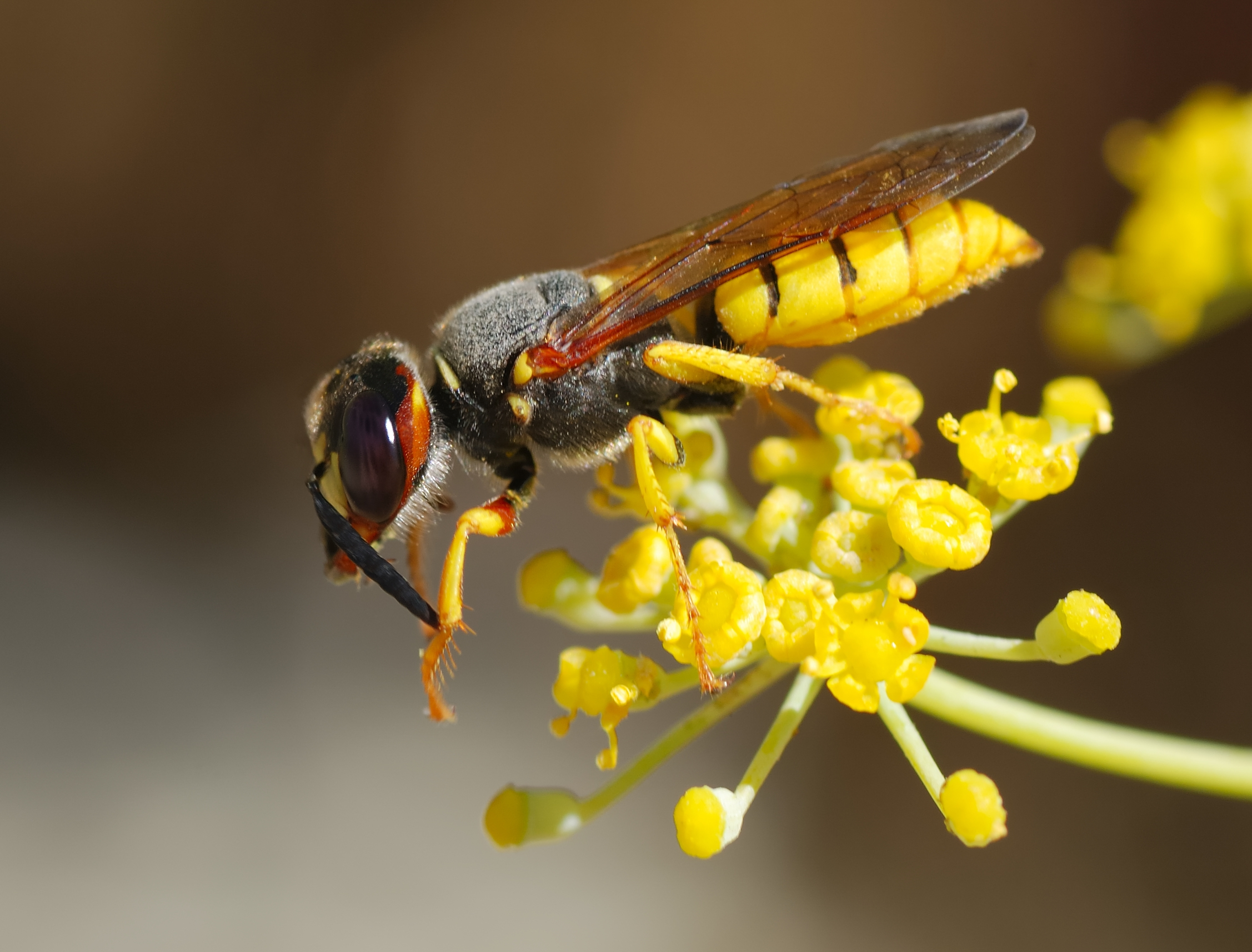
A common parasitoid (the wasp Philanthus triangulum)

Raccoons, opossum and possibly other species of the order Rodentia tend to tear apart the cocoons of the calleta silkmoth. The larvae secrete a defensive chemical protection that normally wards off predators, except in the case of wasps, which tend to be unaffected by the larvae's protection.

=== Parasitoids ===
A parasitoid is an insect that completes its larval development within the body of another insect, eventually killing its host. The most common parasitoid is the wasp. Compared to other large Saturniidea, E. calleta does not appear to be attacked by many parasitoid species, however some reports have been seen.

== Uses of Eupackardia calleta cocoons ==
The cocoons of Eupackardia calleta are often used for ankle rattles and medicinal necklaces in certain American Indian ceremonies. According to Yaqui pascola dancer and artist, Merced Maldonado, Yaqui Indians in Arizona and Mexico, for example, call these rattles "tenabares", or "tenevoim". They are made in pairs and worn around the ankles or on both lower legs.
