= Brickellia cordifolia =

Species of flowering plant

== Summary ==
Brickellia cordifolia
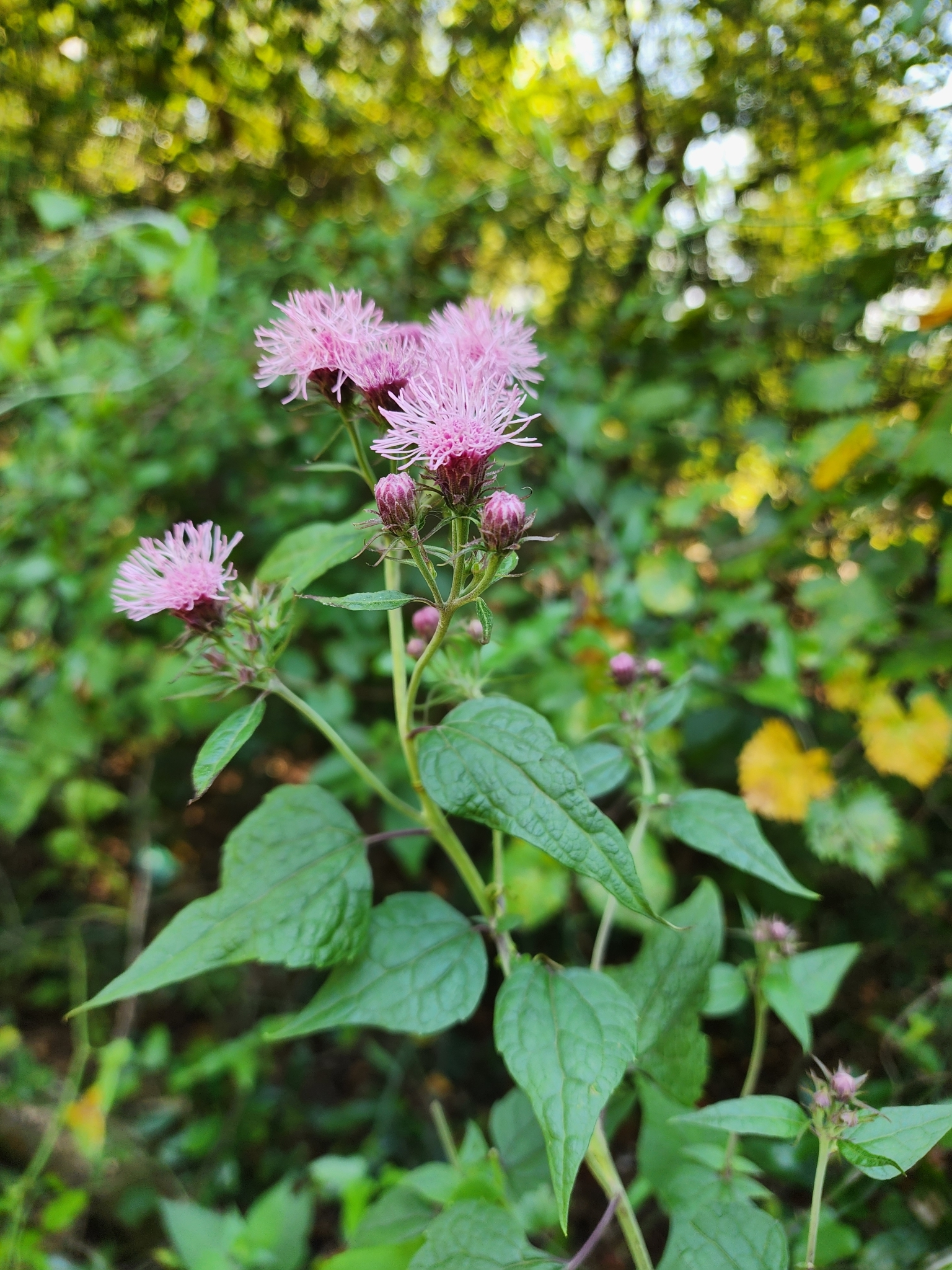

Scientific classification
- Kingdom: Plantae
- Clade: Tracheophytes
- Clade: Angiosperms
- Clade: Eudicots
- Clade: Asterids
- Order: Asterales
- Family: Asteraceae
- Genus: Brickellia
- Species: B. cordifolia

Binomial name
- Brickellia cordifolia Elliott

Synonyms
- Coleosanthus cordifolius (Elliott) Kuntze; Eupatorium brickellia DC.

Brickellia cordifolia is a North American species of flowering plants in the family Asteraceae. It is native to southeastern United States in the states of Florida, Georgia, and Alabama. Common names are Flyr's nemesis or Flyr's brickellbush.

Brickellia cordifolia is a perennial herb growing up to 150 cm (60 inches) tall. It produces many small flower heads with pale yellow-green disc florets but no ray florets. It grows in most pine and oak woodlands at low elevations.

== Description and Distribution ==
Brickellia cordifolia, or better known as Flyr’s Brickell Bush, is a perennial plant, meaning that it lives for many years, rather than cycling annually, and it typically flowers from August to October. Ranging from 50-150 centimeters in height and 10-40 millimeters in leaf length, this flower has a commanding presence. It also contains around 35-45 flowers, which are each about 2-4 inches long. The flowers are usually pale yellow/green accompanied by a purple hue. For a more detailed description of the flower visit the Flora of North America website linked in the references. It is usually found in forests, overgrown woods, or alongside dirt roads in Florida, Georgia or Alabama, and there are roughly 250-2500 individual plants worldwide. It also requires specific conditions, such as moist salt-free soil, and adequate sunlight as well as a range in elevation from about ten to one-hundred meters.

== Contributions ==
Brickellia cordifolia does not have any known medicinal or commercial uses for humans, nor does it have any economic significance. However, it serves as a nectar source for butterflies.

== Conservation ==
Brickellia cordifolia conservation status is endangered. Specifically, it has a S2 state rank and G2-G3 global ranking, making it a growing concern on the state level. On the federal level, there is no conservation efforts being taken. The main threats to its habitat are the cutting of trees, planting of pine trees, and invasion of non-native species. When the habitat is broken up it decreases the rate of pollination. Additionally, fire suppression poses a significant threat to the population since Brickellia is accustomed to periodic fires.
