= Flyriella stanfordii =

Scientific classification
- Kingdom: Plantae
- Clade: Tracheophytes
- Clade: Angiosperms
- Clade: Eudicots
- Clade: Asterids
- Order: Asterales
- Family: Asteraceae
- Genus: Flyriella
- Species: F. stanfordii

Binomial name
- Flyriella stanfordii R.M.King & H.Rob

Species of flowering plant

Flyriella stanfordii is a Mexican species of plants in the family Asteraceae. It is native to the States of Nuevo León, Tamaulipas in northeastern Mexico.

Flyriella stanfordii grows amidst luxuriant vegetation in moist canyons. Its stem is covered with long hairs. Leaves are egg-shaped, up to 12 cm (4.7 in) long. One plant will produce numerous flower heads tightly packed into a flat-topped array. Each head has 20-23 white disc flowers but no ray flowers.
