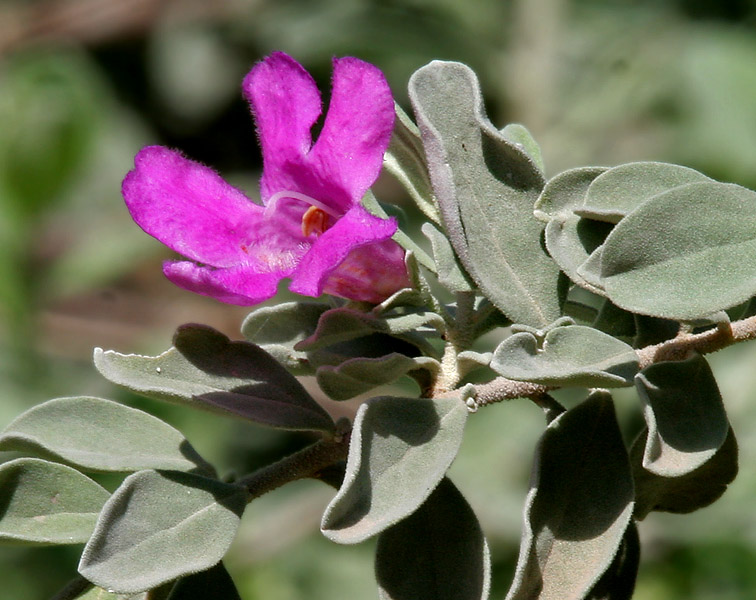

Scientific classification
- Kingdom: Plantae
- Clade: Tracheophytes
- Clade: Angiosperms
- Clade: Eudicots
- Clade: Asterids
- Order: Lamiales
- Family: Scrophulariaceae
- Genus: Leucophyllum
- Species: L. frutescens

Binomial name
- Leucophyllum frutescens (Berland.) I.M.Johnst.

Synonyms
- Terania frutescens Berland.

= Leucophyllum frutescens =

Species of flowering plant in the figwort family

Leucophyllum frutescens is an evergreen shrub in the figwort family, Scrophulariaceae, native to the U.S. state of Texas, where it is the official "State Native Shrub of Texas", and to the states of Coahuila, Nuevo León, and Tamaulipas in northern Mexico. Although commonly known as Texas sage, it is not a true sage and is distinct from the genus Salvia. The species is also called Texas Ranger, Texas rain sage, cenizo, Texas silverleaf, Texas barometerbush, ash-bush, wild lilac, purple sage, senisa, cenicilla, palo cenizo, or hierba del cenizo.

== Description ==
The solitary axillary flowers are bell- or funnel-shaped, with five lobes and two lips. This species is found in rocky, calcareous soils.

== Cultivation ==
Due to its abundant purple flowers, Texas sage is a popular ornamental plant, commonly used for edge and area plantings in warmer and drier areas. It requires minimal water, is easily shaped into hedges, and blooms over the entire surface. It is available in a variety of cultivars, including 'Green Cloud', 'White Cloud', 'Compacta', 'Convent', and 'Bert-Star'.

== Ecology ==
Leucophyllum frutescens is a host plant for the caterpillars of the theona checkerspot (Chlosyne theona) and calleta silkmoth (Eupackardia calleta).

== Barometer bush ==
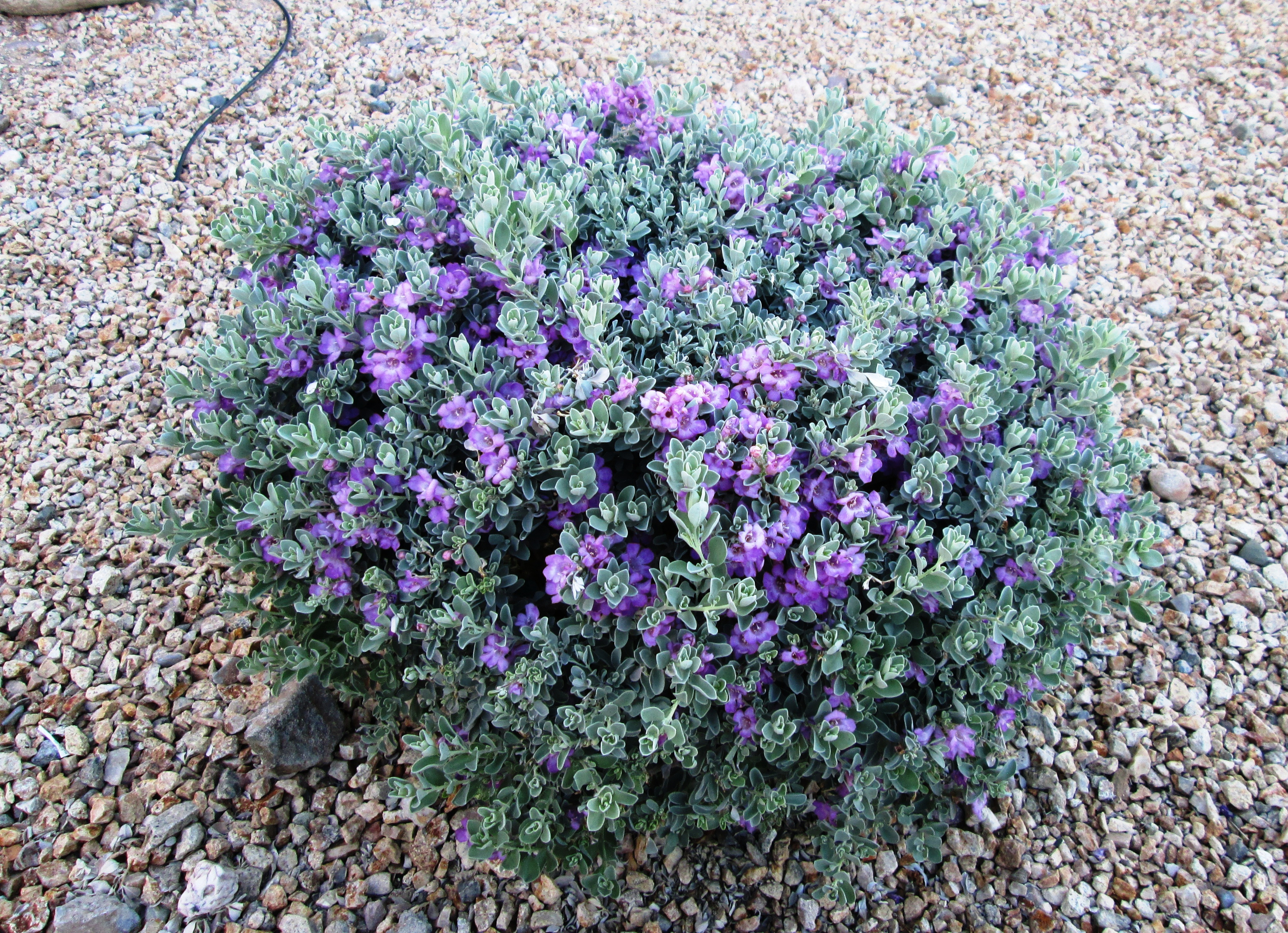
Ornamental Texas sage in bloom

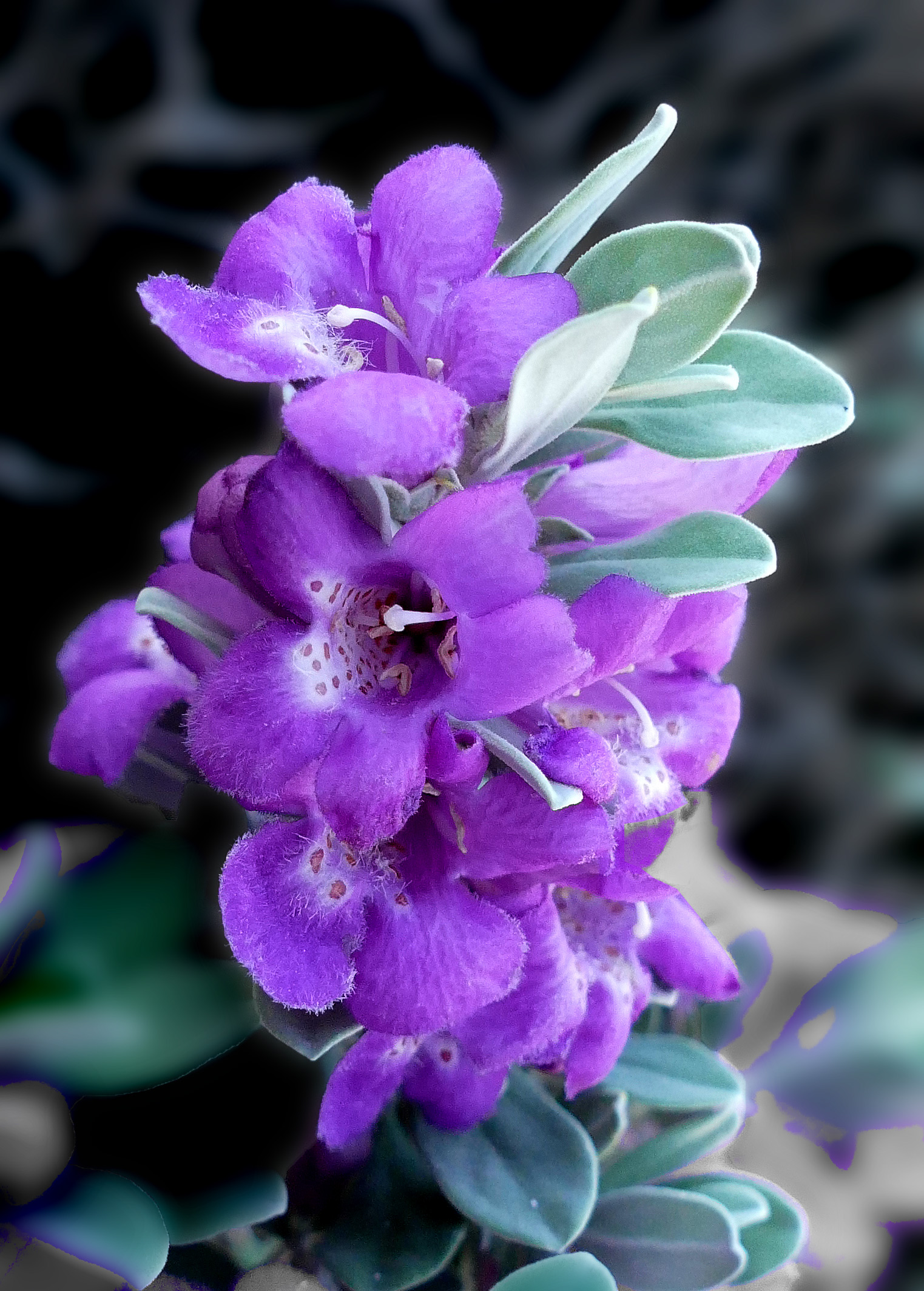
Texas sage

Texas sage is nicknamed the "barometer bush" due to a commonly held belief that it can predict the rain. According to folklore, the plant goes into bloom in anticipation of upcoming rain. It appears that the plant sometimes blooms because of humidity or low atmospheric pressure, which can occur before or after rain.
