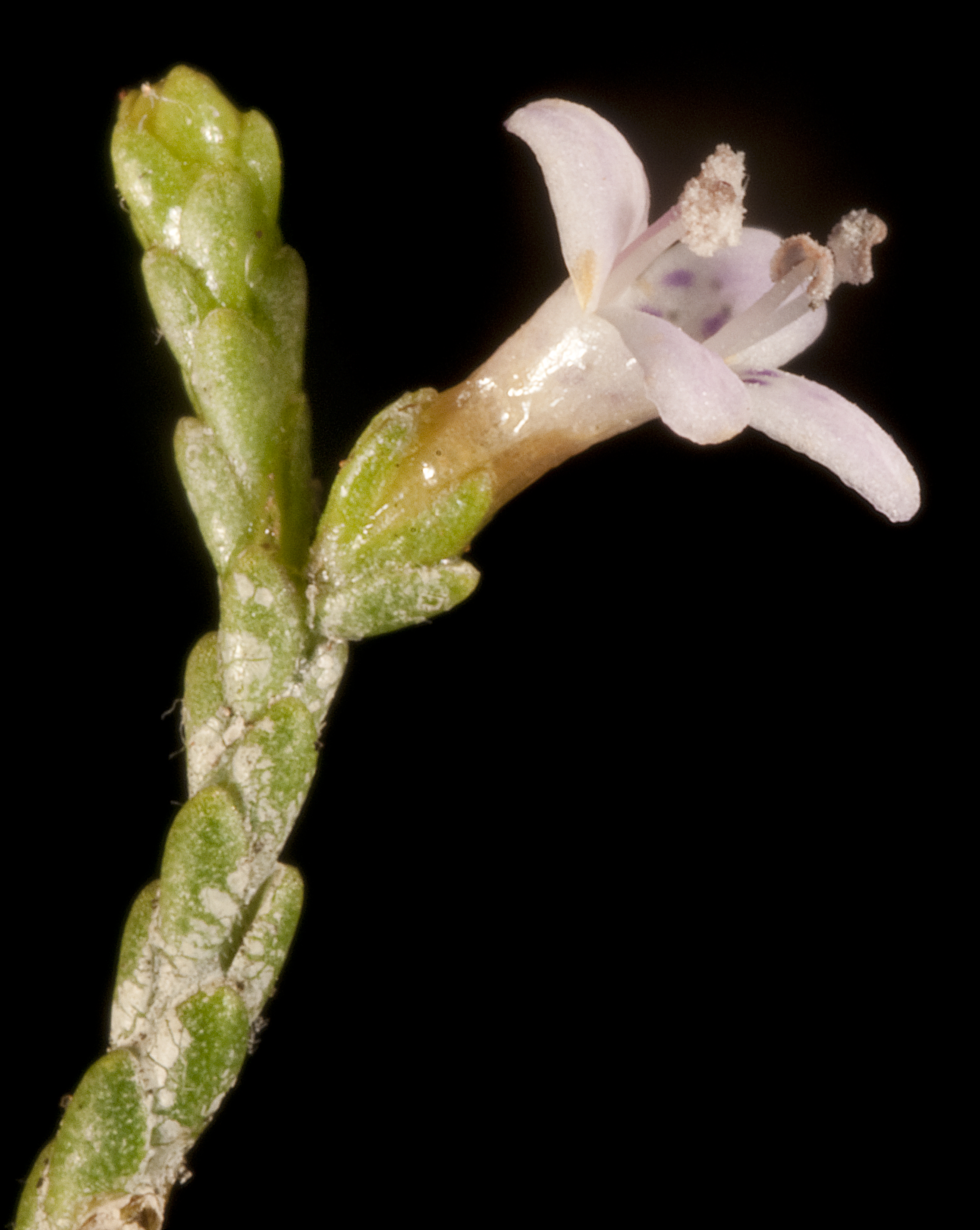

Conservation status
- Priority Three — Poorly Known Taxa (DEC)

Scientific classification
- Kingdom: Plantae
- Clade: Tracheophytes
- Clade: Angiosperms
- Clade: Eudicots
- Clade: Asterids
- Order: Lamiales
- Family: Scrophulariaceae
- Genus: Diocirea
- Species: D. microphylla

Binomial name
- Diocirea microphylla R.J.Chinnock

= Diocirea microphylla =

Species of flowering plant

Diocirea microphylla is a plant in the figwort family (Scrophulariaceae), and is endemic to a small area near Coolgardie in Western Australia. It is a low shrub with thin branches and minute leaves pressed against the stems. It is readily distinguished from the other three species in the genus by its tiny leaves.

== Description ==
Diocirea microphylla is a shrub with many stems and which sometimes grows to a height of 0.8 metres (3 ft) and spreads to a width of 1.6 metres (5 ft). Its branches are less than about 1 millimetre (0.04 in) in diameter and unlike others in the genus, lack raised glands. The leaves are mostly 1.5–2 millimetres (0.06–0.08 in) long, about 1 millimetre (0.04 in) wide, egg-shaped, pressed against the stem and sticky due to the presence of resin.

The flowers are borne singly in leaf axils and lack a stalk. There are 5 egg-shaped, pointed green sepals joined together at their base. The petals are white or pale violet joined to form a tube 1.5–2.5 millimetres (0.06–0.1 in) long with lobes which are about the same length and are spotted purple near their bases. The tube is mostly glabrous except for a few hairs on the bottom lobe. There are 4 stamens which extend slightly beyond the petal tube. The fruit that follows flowering is cone-shaped, dark brown, wrinkled and glabrous and about 2 by 1.5 millimetres (0.08 in × 0.06 in).

== Taxonomy and naming ==
Diocirea microphylla was first formally described by taxonomist Bob Chinnock in Eremophila and allied genera: a monograph of the plant family Myoporaceae in 2007 from a specimen collected near Coolgardie. Chinnock states that the specific epithet is derived from "Greek microphylla, small leaves". In ancient Greek, the feminine adjective mikrophyllos (μικρόφυλλος) means "with small leaves", the same meaning that is ascribed to the feminine adjective microphylla in botanical Latin.

== Distribution and habitat ==
Diocirea microphylla occurs in a small area north of Coolgardie in the Coolgardie biogeographic region where it grows in woodland on clay loam. Only a few populations are known but in several of these it forms an almost continuous ground cover with thousands of individual plants.

== Conservation ==
Diocirea microphylla has been classified as "Priority Three" by the Government of Western Australia Department of Parks and Wildlife meaning that it is poorly known and known from only a few locations but is not under imminent threat.
