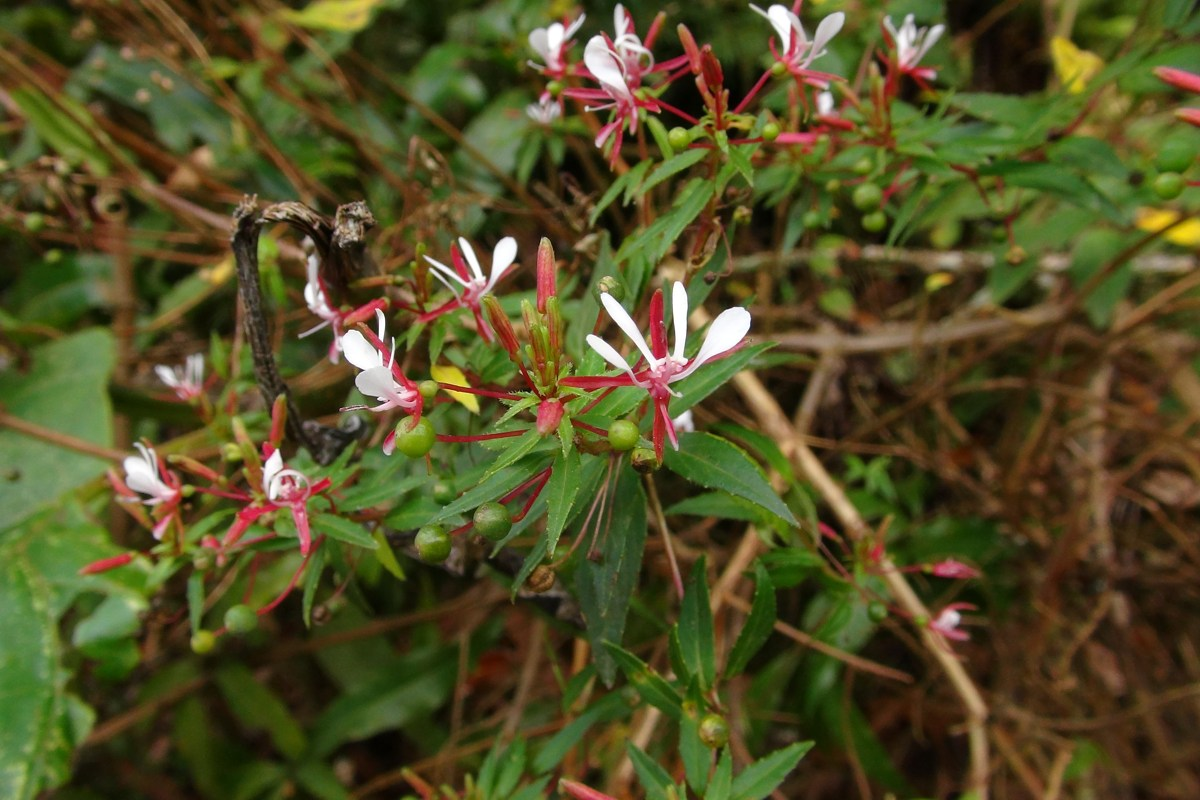
- Lopezia miniata, flowering shrub.

Scientific classification
- Kingdom: Plantae
- Clade: Embryophytes
- Clade: Tracheophytes
- Clade: Angiosperms
- Clade: Eudicots
- Clade: Rosids
- Order: Myrtales
- Family: Onagraceae
- Subfamily: Onagroideae
- Tribe: Lopezieae
- Genus: Lopezia; Cav.

Species
- See text.

Synonyms
- Diplandra Hook. & Arn.; Enthomanthus Moc. & Sessé ex Ramírez; Jehlia Planch. ex Rose; Pelozia Rose (Note: Pelozia is a taxonomic anagram of Lopezia.); Pisaura Bonato; Pseudolopezia Rose; Riesenbachia C.Presl; Rudicularia Moc. & Sessé ex Ramírez; Semeiandra Hook. & Arn.

= Lopezia =

Genus of flowering plants

Lopezia is a genus of plants of the family Onagraceae, largely restricted to Mexico and Central America.

== Description ==
Herbs or shrubs, mostly freely branched. Leaves petioled, alternate, or the lower opposite, simple. Flowers -solitary, small, pedicelled, in upper axils of sometimes much reduced leaves. Floral tube inconspicuous. Sepals 4, mostly red, narrow. Petals 4, dissimilar, white to rose, the 2 upper unguiculate, with none, one, or two glands at apex of claw; the 2 lower clawed and curved upward, glandless. Stamens 2, adnate to the style and connate with each other at the base, the posterior fertile, the anterior sterile, petaloid. Ovary 4-loculed; style short, filiform, with slightly enlarged and barely lobed stigma; ovules multiseriate, many. Capsule globose to clavate, coriaceous, 4-loculed and -valved. Seeds many, obovoid, granulate.

== Distribution ==
It is found in Costa Rica, El Salvador, Guatemala, Honduras, Mexico and Panamá.

== Species ==
According to Kew, there are 28 species are recognized in the genus Lopezia in 2022:

- Lopezia ciliatula Plitmann, P.H.Raven & Breedlove
- Lopezia clavata Brandegee
- Lopezia concinna P.H. Raven
- Lopezia conjugans Brandegee
- Lopezia cornuta S. Watson
- Lopezia coronata Andrews
- Lopezia galeottii Planch.
- Lopezia gentryi (Munz) Plitmann, P.H. Raven & Breedlove
- Lopezia gracilis S. Watson
- Lopezia grandiflora Zucc.
- Lopezia hirsuta Jacq.
- Lopezia integrifolia DC.
- Lopezia laciniata (Rose) M.E. Jones
- Lopezia langmaniae Miranda. The species name langmaniae was given in honor of Ida Kaplan Langman.
- Lopezia longiflora Decne.
- Lopezia lopezioides (Hook. & Arn.) Plitmann, P.H. Raven & Breedlove
- Lopezia miniata Lag. ex DC.
  - Lopezia miniata subsp. paniculata (Seem.) Plitmann, P.H. Raven & Breedlove
- Lopezia oaxacana Rose
- Lopezia ovata (Plitmann, P.H. Raven & Breedlove) Plitmann
- Lopezia pringlei Rose
- Lopezia racemosa Cav.
- Lopezia riesenbachia Plitmann, P.H. Raven & Breedlove
- Lopezia semeiandra Plitmann, P.H. Raven & Breedlove
- Lopezia sinaloensis Munz
- Lopezia smithii Rose
- Lopezia suffrutescens Munz
- Lopezia trichota Schltdl.
- Lopezia violacea Rose

== Gallery ==
Lopezia
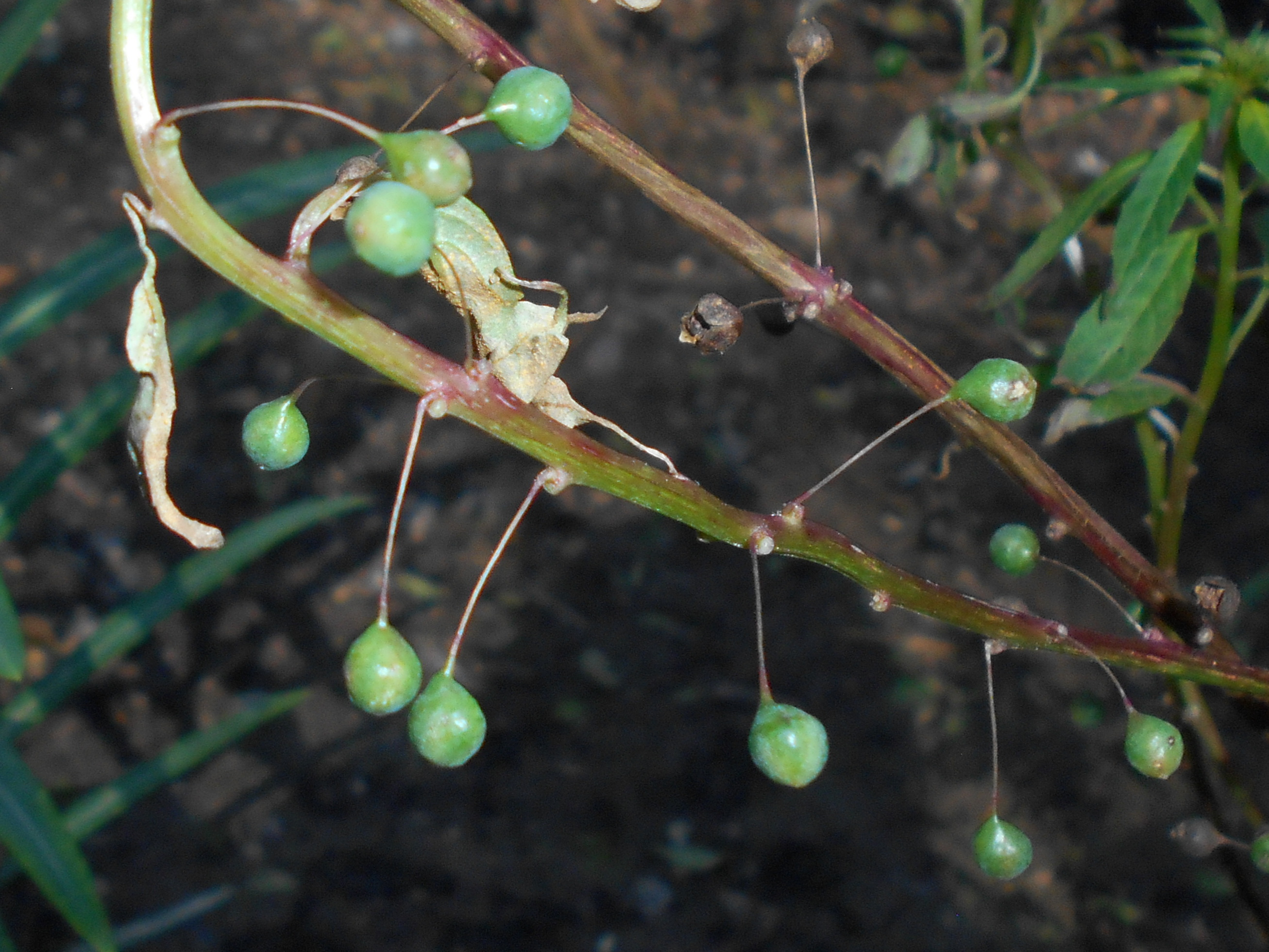
L. coronata

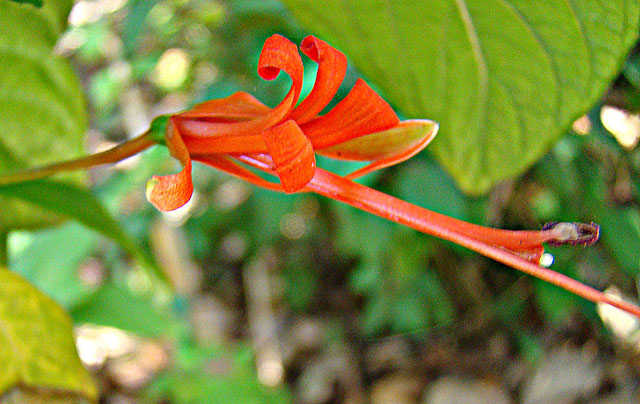
L. longiflora

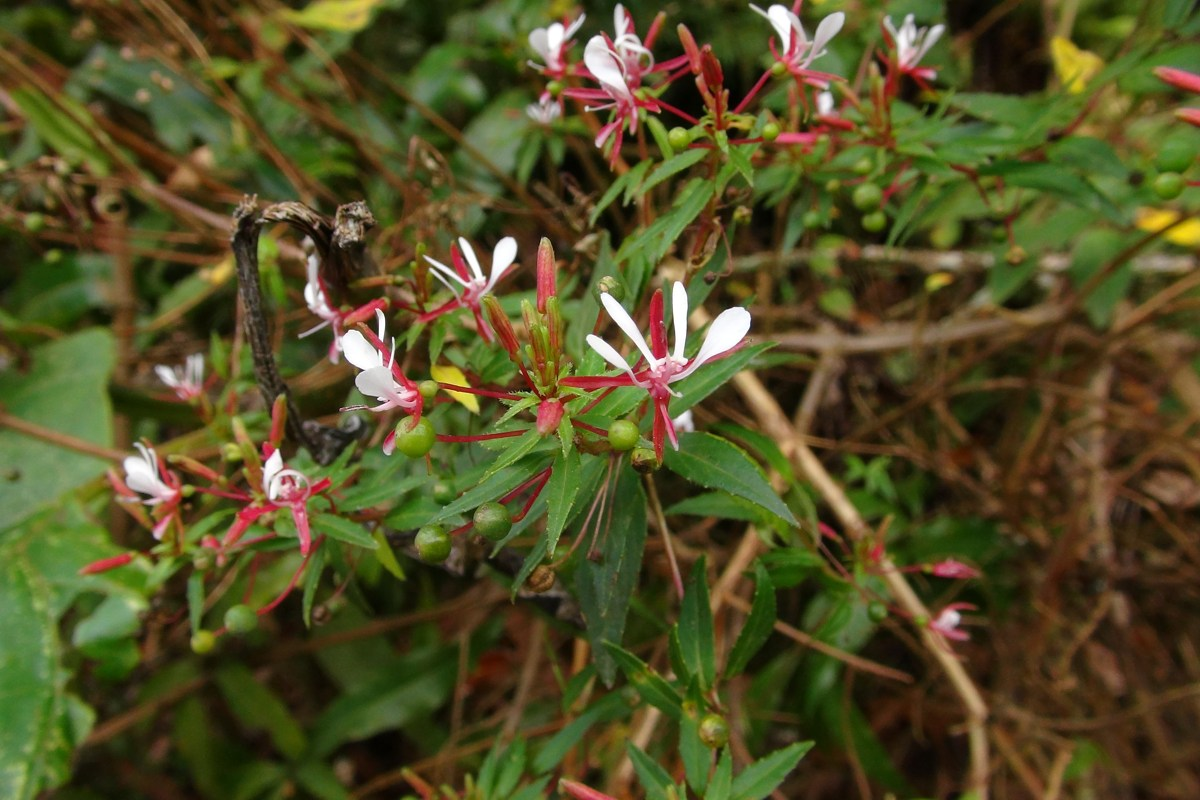
L. miniata

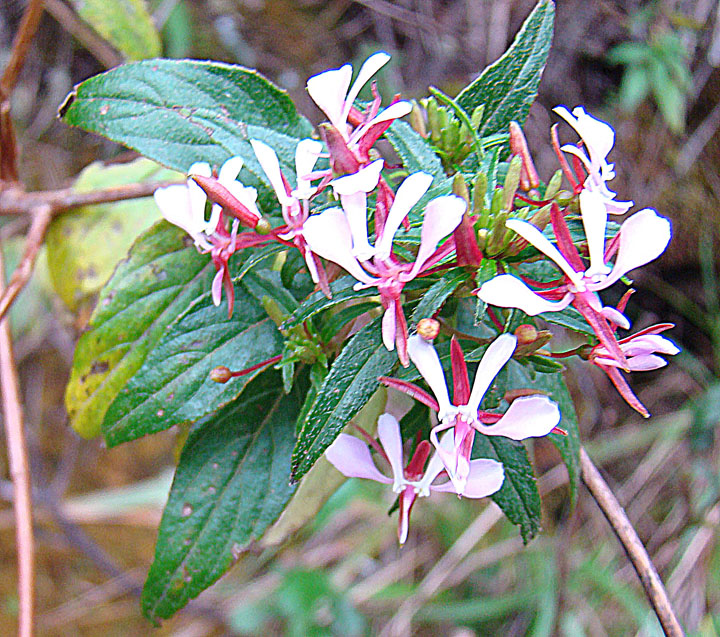
L. paniculata

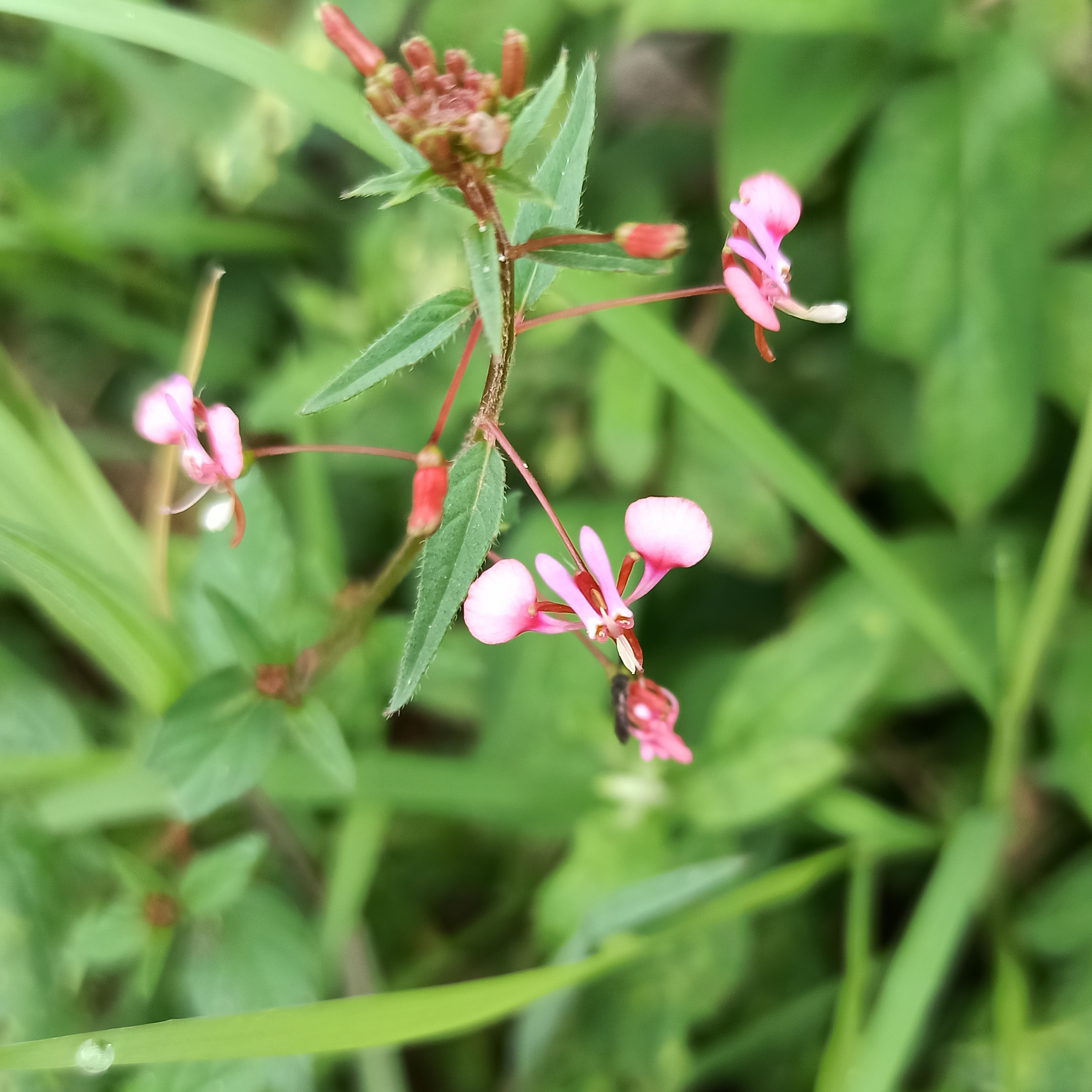
L. racemosa
