= Flyriella =

Scientific classification
- Kingdom: Plantae
- Clade: Embryophytes
- Clade: Tracheophytes
- Clade: Angiosperms
- Clade: Eudicots
- Clade: Asterids
- Order: Asterales
- Family: Asteraceae
- Subfamily: Asteroideae
- Tribe: Eupatorieae
- Genus: Flyriella; R.M.King & H.Rob

Type species
- Flyriella parryi R.M.King & H.Rob

Genus of flowering plants

Flyriella is a genus of perennial flowering plants in the family Asteraceae, and the species are commonly called brickellbush. They are native to Texas and Mexico.

== Species ==
Species:

- Flyriella chrysostyla (B.L. Rob.) R.M. King & H. Rob. - (Eupatorium chrysostylum B.L. Rob.) - Chihuahua
- Flyriella harrimanii R.M. King & H. Rob. - Tamaulipas
- Flyriella leonensis (B.L. Rob.) R.M. King & H. Rob. - (Eupatorium leonense B.L. Rob.) - Nuevo León
- Flyriella parryi (A. Gray) R.M. King & H. Rob. - (Eupatorium parryi A. Gray) - Chihuahua, Coahuila, Nuevo León, Texas,
- Flyriella sphenopoda (B.L. Rob.) R.M. King & H. Rob. - (Eupatorium sphenopodum B.L. Rob.) - Nuevo León
- Flyriella stanfordii R.M. King & H. Rob. - Nuevo León, Tamaulipas
