= Fleischmanniopsis =

Scientific classification
- Kingdom: Plantae
- Clade: Embryophytes
- Clade: Tracheophytes
- Clade: Angiosperms
- Clade: Eudicots
- Clade: Asterids
- Order: Asterales
- Family: Asteraceae
- Subfamily: Asteroideae
- Tribe: Eupatorieae
- Genus: Fleischmanniopsis; R.M.King & H.Rob.

Genus of flowering plants

Fleischmanniopsis is a genus of Mesoamerican flowering plants in the family Asteraceae.

Species

- Fleischmanniopsis anomalochaeta R.M.King & H.Rob. - El Salvador, Guatemala
- Fleischmanniopsis langmaniae R.M.King & H.Rob. - Chiapas. The species name langmaniae was given in honor of Ida Kaplan Langman.
- Fleischmanniopsis leucocephala (Benth.) R.M.King & H.Rob. - Veracruz, Oaxaca, Chiapas, Guatemala, El Salvador, Honduras, Nicaragua
- Fleischmanniopsis mendax (Standl. & Steyerm.) R.M.King & H.Rob.- Guatemala, Oaxaca
- Fleischmanniopsis nubigenoides (B.L.Rob.) R.M.King & H.Rob. - Chiapas, Guatemala
