= Diocirea acutifolia =

Conservation status
- Priority Three — Poorly Known Taxa (DEC)

Scientific classification
- Kingdom: Plantae
- Clade: Tracheophytes
- Clade: Angiosperms
- Clade: Eudicots
- Clade: Asterids
- Order: Lamiales
- Family: Scrophulariaceae
- Genus: Diocirea
- Species: D. acutifolia

Binomial name
- Diocirea acutifolia R.J.Chinnock

Species of flowering plant

Diocirea acutifolia is a plant in the figwort family, Scrophulariaceae and is endemic to a small area near Norseman in Western Australia. The branches and leaves produce sticky resin which sometimes covers the whole plant making it appear bluish grey. This species is distinguished from the three others in the genus by its leaves which are longer than 6 millimetres (0.2 in) and the prominent resin glands on its stems.

== Description ==
Diocirea acutifolia is a shrub with many stems which sometimes grows to a height of 0.6 metres (2 ft) and spreads to a width of 0.8 metres (3 ft). Its branches are covered with raised light brown glands which produce a white resin. The leaves are arranged in a spiral around the stems and are mostly 6.6–9.5 millimetres (0.3–0.4 in) long, 1–1.5 millimetres (0.04–0.06 in) wide, linear in shape and often blue-green in colour due to dried resin on their surfaces.

The flowers are borne singly in leaf axils and lack a stalk. There are 5 egg-shaped, pointed green sepals and 5 petals. The petals are white or pale violet joined to form a tube 2–3 millimetres (0.08–0.1 in) long with lobes which are also 2–3 millimetres (0.08–0.1 in) long and often spotted with purple, extending into the tube. The tube is mostly glabrous except for a few hairs on the bottom lobe and inside the tube. There are 4 stamens which extend slightly beyond the petal tube. The fruit that follows flowering is oval-shaped, surrounded by a hairy shell and is about 2 by 3 millimetres (0.08 in × 0.1 in).

== Taxonomy and naming ==
Diocirea acutifolia was first formally described by taxonomist Bob Chinnock in Eremophila and allied genera: a monograph of the plant family Myoporaceae in 2007 from a specimen collected near Kambalda, about 45 kilometres (30 mi) north of the Lake Cowan Causeway. The specific epithet (acutifolia) is derived from "Latin acutifolia, acute-leaved".

== Distribution and habitat ==
Diocirea acutifolia occurs in a small area north of Norseman in the Coolgardie biogeographic region where it grows in woodland on gravelly loam.

== Conservation ==
Diocirea acutifolia has been classified as "Priority Three" by the Government of Western Australia Department of Parks and Wildlife meaning that it is poorly known and known from only a few locations but is not under imminent threat.
