= Ida Kaplan Langman =

American botanist specialist of the flora of Mexico

- Born: 7 February 1904; Borzna, Russian Empire
- Died: 1991 (aged 87)
- Known for: The 1,015-page opus A Selected Guide to the Literature of the Flowering Plants of Mexico (1964)
- Scientific career
- Fields: Botanist

Ida Kaplan Langman was a Russian-born, American botanist. She made two long expeditions in Mexico from 1939 to 1941 and from 1948 to 1949. She is best known as the author of A Selected Guide to the Literature on the Flowering Plants of Mexico (1964).

== Early life ==
Ida Kaplan was born in 1904 in the Russian Empire. Her family moved to Philadelphia when she was six months old. She was the daughter of Hyman Kaplan and Dora Shedlowsky, and had three younger siblings: Cecily, Frank, and Mae. In 1916, Ida entered the South Philadelphia High School for Girls (SPHS), and she graduated in 1920. After graduation she attended the Philadelphia Normal School and then became a science teacher in the Philadelphia public schools.

== Career ==
While working as a teacher, she attended the University of Pennsylvania to study education and botany. After receiving a master's degree in botany in 1945, she became a research fellow for several years.

In addition to her work as a schoolteacher, Ida also worked as an educator at the Academy of Natural Sciences, where she conducted classes for children and their teachers.

An avid traveler and student, Ida spent a total of more than three years living in Mexico, where she worked in libraries and collected plants. Most of the specimens she brought back came from along highways and well-traveled trails. Yet with such casual collecting, among 1000 species were sampled, including a number of new ones. Grants from the National Science Foundation, the American Philosophical Society, and the U.S. Office of Education helped finance her trips.

In 1964 she published A Selected Guide to the Literature on Mexican Flowering Plants, a thousand-page compendium of more than twenty thousand entries. She published numerous articles in both English and Spanish and worked as a bibliographer at the Hunt Institute for Botanical Documentation of Carnegie Mellon University. She was a member of the Women's International League for Peace and Freedom, the Botanical Club of Philadelphia, and after retiring, moved to Atlantic City, where she volunteered for the American Civil Liberties Union.

== Private life ==
Ida Kaplan married Oscar Langman, a violinist, in 1928. They had no children. After having Parkinson's Disease for several years, Ida Kaplan Langman died in 1991.

== Taxonomic patronyms ==
In honor of Ida Kaplan Langman, three taxonomic patronyms were given in plants with the species name langmaniae :

- Fleischmanniopsis langmaniae R.M. King & H. Rob.;
- Leucophyllum langmaniae Flyr;
- Lopezia langmanae Miranda.
