= Diocirea =

Scientific classification
- Kingdom: Plantae
- Clade: Tracheophytes
- Clade: Angiosperms
- Clade: Eudicots
- Clade: Asterids
- Order: Lamiales
- Family: Scrophulariaceae
- Tribe: Myoporeae
- Genus: Diocirea; Chinnock

Genus of flowering plants

Diocirea is a genus of flowering plants in the figwort family, Scrophulariaceae. The genus is endemic to a small area in the south-west of Western Australia and is intermediate in character between Eremophila and Myoporum. There are four members of the genus, all of which are small shrubs with stems and leaves which produce a resin making the plants appear bluish-green. Neither the genus, nor any of the species had been described before 2007 although a few specimens had been collected as Eremophila elachantha. Despite their limited distribution, they often occur in populations of several thousand individual plants, forming a dense ground cover.

== Description ==
Plants in the genus Diocirea are small, multi-stemmed shrubs, rarely growing to a height of 1 metre (3 ft) with a spread of 1.5 metres (5 ft). Their branches and leaves have many, sometimes raised glands, producing a resin which often gives the foliage a bluish-green tinge. Their leaves range in length from 1 millimetre (0.04 in) to 10 millimetres (0.4 in), lack serration on their margins and are usually glabrous.

The flowers appear singly in the axils of the leaves, lack a stalk and have 5 green, egg-shaped, sepals and 5 petals. The petals are joined at their bases to form a bell-shaped tube, but unlike in Eremophila and Myoporum, the upper two are joined for nearly all of their length. Also unlike others in the family, the petal tube remains attached to the plant until the fruit is almost fully formed. The fruit is dry, crusty and oval or conical in shape and often hairy.

== Taxonomy and naming ==
The genus Diocirea was first formally described in 2007 by Robert J. (Bob) Chinnock in Eremophila and allied genera : a monograph of the plant family Myoporaceae and the first species he named was Diocirea violacea. A few specimens of Diocirea had been collected prior to 2007 and labelled as Eremophila elachantha Diels, however the type specimen of this species was destroyed in Berlin. The genus name (Diocirea) is an anagram of "ericoid" in reference to the similarity of the habit of plants in this genus to those in Erica.

The names of four species of Diocirea are accepted by the Australian Plant Census:

- Diocirea acutifolia Chinnock
- Diocirea microphylla Chinnock
- Diocirea ternata Chinnock
- Diocirea violacea Chinnock

== Distribution ==
All four Diocirea species are only found in the Coolgardie and Mallee biogeographic regions. Although their distribution is restricted, they often grow in populations of thousands forming a dense ground cover sometimes to the exclusion of other species.

== Conservation ==
Two species, Diocirea acutifolia and Diocirea microphylla, are classified as "Priority Three" by the Western Australian government Department of Parks and Wildlife meaning that they are rare or near threatened.
