= Lowell David Flyr =

20th century American botanist

Lowell David Flyr (1937–1971) was an American botanist. Born in Stratford, Texas, Flyr conducted his graduate thesis work at the University of Texas in Austin. He is known for his work on the genus Brickellia.

At the age of 33, Flyr committed suicide in Dallas while undergoing treatment for depression.

The species Brickellia cordifolia is called "Flyr's Nemesis" or "Flyr's brickellbush" in his honor.
