= Cimora =

Type of hallucinogen

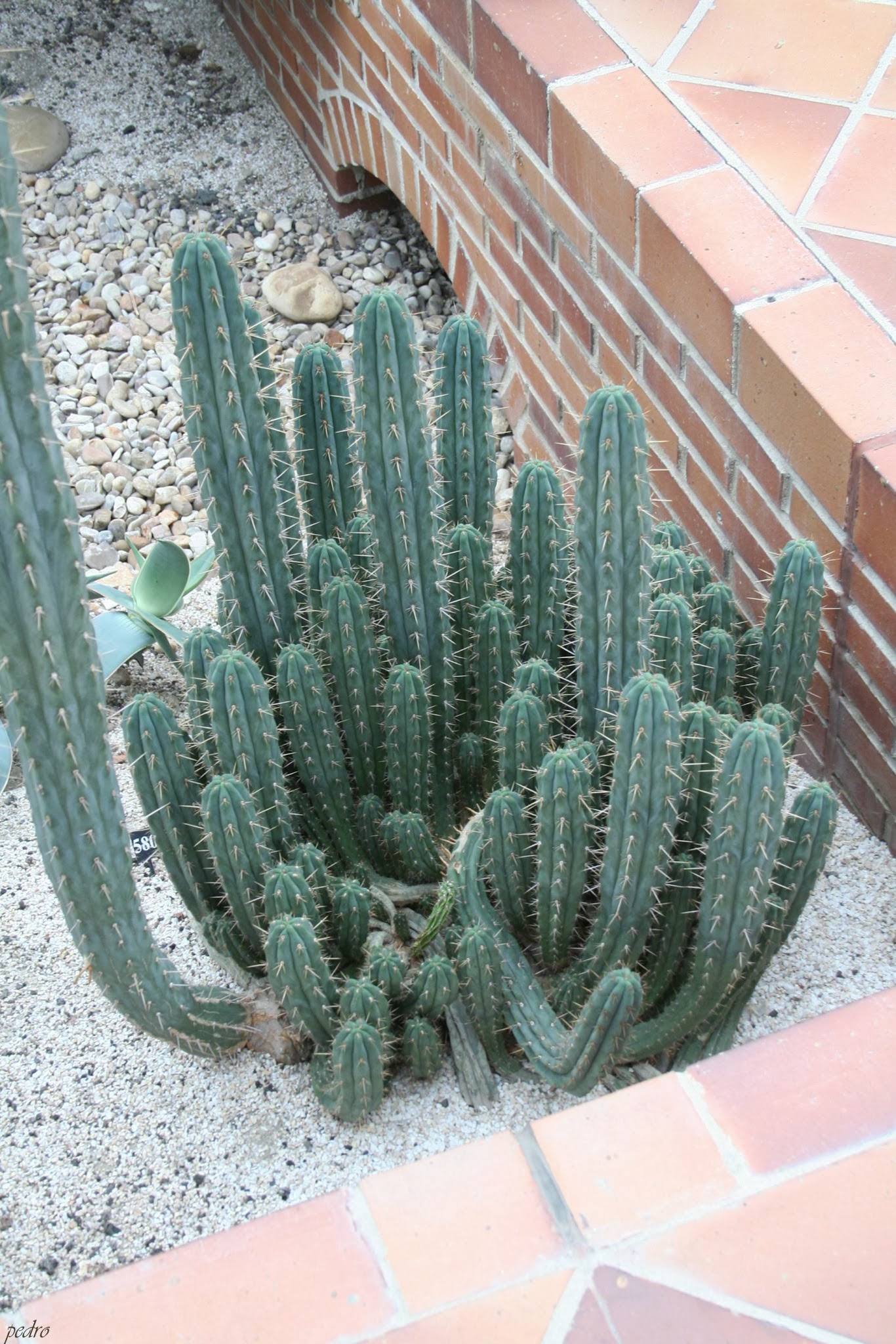
Trichocereus peruvianus, the key ingredient in the cimora brew.

Cimora is a Peruvian term used to describe a brew with hallucinogenic properties made from the “San Pedro” cacti (Trichocereus pachanoi) and other plants such as chamico (Datura stramonium) in South America, used traditionally for shamanic purposes and healing in Peru and Bolivia. The name is also used to describe a number of both hallucinogenic and non-hallucinogenic plants in the region, some of which are used in traditional medicines. Which plants go by the name cimora is an ethnobotanical problem that has been debated at great length by ethnobotanists in many different journals. The term cimora is said to refer to algo malo, meaning something bad. San Pedro goes by many names including pachanoi, aguacolla, elremedio, gigantón, and cactus of the four winds. The ritualistic use of the brew is similar to ayahuasca, which is a South American used as a traditional spirit medicine in Brazil, although while the active ingredient in ayahuasca is DMT, the active ingredient in cimora is mescaline. The use of cimora and the rituals involved have evolved throughout history due to the influence of those who controlled Peru at different stages, although it has almost always involved the use of the San Pedro cactus and its mescaline content.

== Cimora (drink) ==
=== Plants and admixtures in the cimora brew ===
The main ingredient in the brew is the cactus Trichocereus pachanoi, also known as San Pedro, which contains Mescaline, which is responsible for the hallucinogenic effects of cimora. Other plants are commonly included in the mixture such as Neoraimondia arequipensis (syn. N. macrostibas), Brugmansia arborea, Pedilanthus tithymaloides, Datura stramonium and Isotoma longiflora. Other ingredients such as powdered bones, archaeological dust from sacred sites or cemetery dust are added if the illness is thought to be caused by black magic.

=== Effects of the brew ===
Trichocereus pachanoi is the main ingredient in cimora, which contains concentrations of mescaline. This ingredient causes a number of effects, which can include euphoria, hallucinations, depersonalization and psychoses. Mescaline binds to serotonin and dopamine receptors, causing increased levels of serotonin and dopamine, which could explain the euphoria response to the brew. Additional admixtures can increase and/or alter the effects depending on which plants are added.

== Cimora (plant species) ==
The term cimora, as well as variants such as cimorilla, have been used to describe many different types of plants in the Peruvian region. This has led to an ethnobotanical problem surrounding the correct identification of the plants, as discussed below.

=== Types of plants ===
The term cimora and its variations are used to describe many different plant species. The reason given for this by Bussmann and Sharon are that the many species names have come from indigenous names, and have been altered due to different dialects and different regions. The following are a number of different plants going by the name or similar names as cimora in the Peruvian region, as well their use in traditional healing practices, if they have one.

- Cimora señorita, also known as Iresine herbstii. This plant is traditionally used for the treatment of skin conditions, such as eczemas.
- Cimorilla or timorilla, also known as Coleus blumei (now Coleus scutellarioides). This plant is used externally on inflammation.
- Cimora macanche, also known as Sanchezia.
- Cimora lanza, also known as Iresine.
- Cimora León also known as Acalypha macrostachya.
- Cimora oso also known as Coleus.

There are also two unidentified species called "cimorilla dominadora" and "cimora colambu".

== Use ==
=== History ===
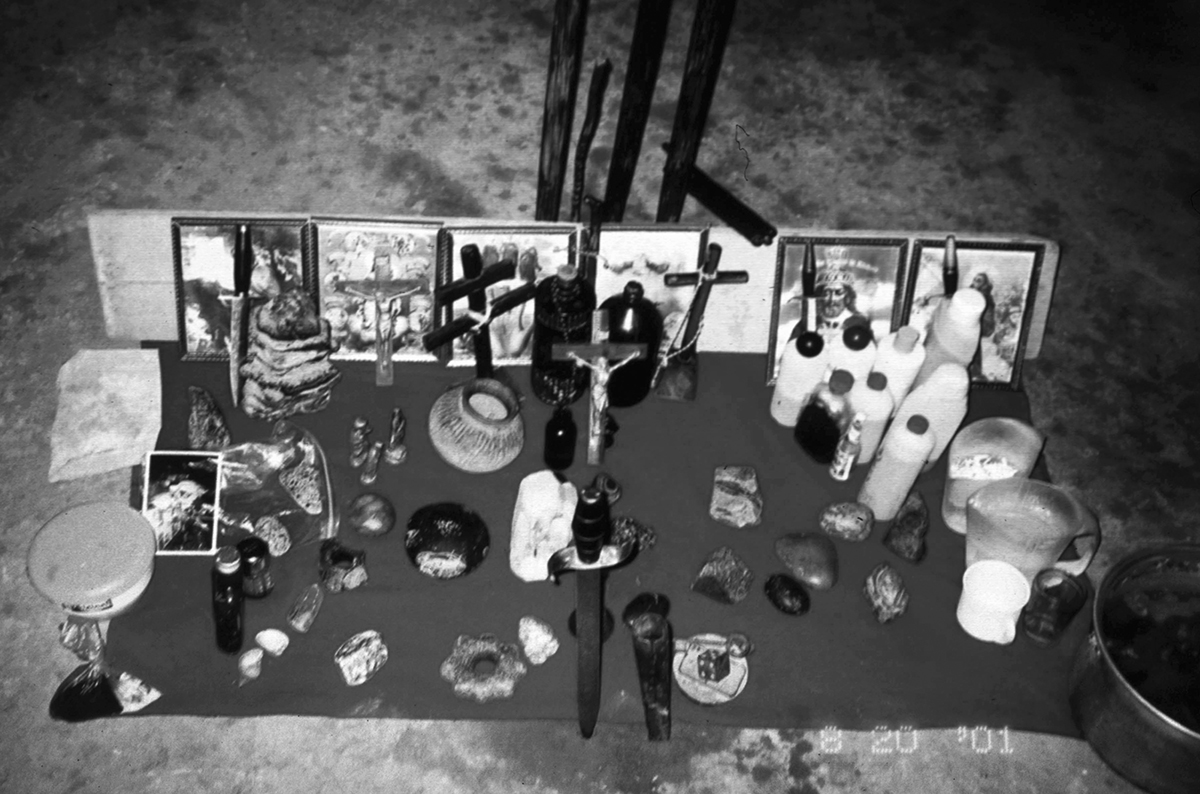
A healers mesa, with objects of power that are said to be instrumental in the healing process as they represent both sides, light and dark, good and evil.

Cimora has been used extensively throughout history, with historical references to the San Pedro Cactus in early Chavín culture dating as far back as 200 BC. In fact, Dobkin De Rios argues that the use of psychedelics such as cimora shaped these people and their religion, which has in turn shaped the importance of cimora in modern day ritualistic healing. The Spanish colonisation of South America involved the widespread suppression of local culture, medicine and religion by the conquistadors. Despite this, the traditions of San Pedro survived in the form of cimora, though the ritual picked up elements of Catholicism as well as the traditional Mochican religion. The first attempt to document the use of hallucinogens in traditional shamanistic rituals in Peru was made by Chiappe and Millones.

=== Preparation ===
Traditionally, the preparation of the cimora brew involves the collecting of four of the San Pedro Cacti, and slicing these into cross sections, similar to a loaf of bread. These slices are then boiled for several hours, creating the brew which can then either be consumed on its own, or with other boiled plants which can be added to the mixture. While most of the San Pedro cactus used are the seven ribbed species, the rarer four ribbed cactus is often used for particularly difficult healing cases, as the four ribs are seen to symbolise what is known as the “four winds” and “four roads”, which are symbolic as they are said to have supernatural powers. In preparation for the healing ceremony, the patients must bring offerings such as a bottle of alcohol, a bag of sugar, scented water and red perfume.

=== Traditional ===
Traditionally, cimora is used by Peruvian medicine men and women, or herbalists, known as curanderos, for the treatment of illnesses. This cult-like religion has elements of the ancient Mochican religion, combined with elements of the more modern Catholicism. This is seen, for instance, in their use of Christian elements such as crosses in the mesas of curanderos. The mesa is an altar-like table adorned with numerous “power objects” such as crosses, pictures of saints stones, swords and other such objects, which are said to have either a positive or negative nature, said to represent good and evil. The use of guinea pigs by healers as a tool to diagnose ailments has also been noted in Peruvian ceremonies. There are also a number of traditional elements involving the usage of cimora by the South American Shamans. These elements include:

1. A belief in 'spirit guardians'.
2. The geographical significance, given supernatural power by animal features, such as a serpent.
3. The disease or illness being engaged in physical combat.
4. The use of magical plants with spiritual power.
5. The belief that the cause of the illness is due to spiritual or supernatural causes.

=== Modern Use ===
Currently, the most common use of cimora and San Pedro is to treat ailments that are thought to have been caused by witchcraft. However there are also recreational users of the brew, for the psychedelic effect of the mescaline found in the Trichocereus pachanoi cactus. While the growth of San Pedro is legal, the use of San Pedro for its mescaline is illegal in some countries, and decriminalised in others.

Cimora and its healing properties have been attributed as the inspiration behind Tomás Tello's album Cimora, showing how influential the brew is still up until today.

== Ethnobotanical problems ==
Many ethnobotanists have sought to define what species of plants that go by the term cimora. Differing opinions have been the subject of discussion and journals, and Schultes has described accurately identifying what goes by the name of cimora as “one of the most challenging problems in the ethnobotany of hallucinogenic plants”. The main source of the problem is differing uses of the word cimora to describe multiple things, both the brew as well as a range of other plants. For instance, Cruz-Sanchez used the term cimora to describe a way of blending plants to brew an intoxicating broth, made from the San Pedro cactus amongst other things, as well as referring to a number of unidentified plants in the region by their Peruvian name that sounded similar to cimora. Friedberg suggested instead that it was not a brew made from cactus but instead labelled it as an Amaranthaceae plant of the Iresine genus. Later, Schultes questioned earlier work by Friedberg, in particular the use of the word 'timora' to describe a "magic and dangerous herb", and postulated that 'cimora' and 'timora' might instead be two versions of the same word.
