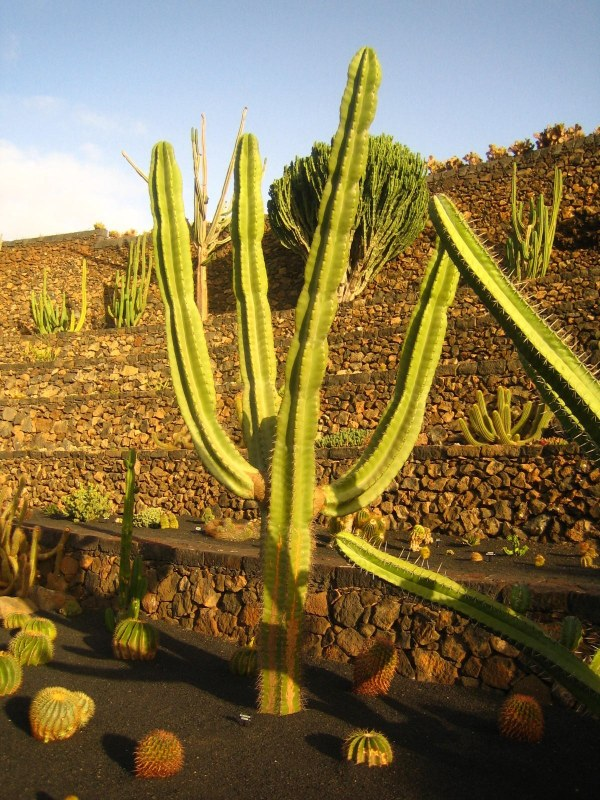
- Neoraimondia herzogiana at Lanzarote

Scientific classification
- Kingdom: Plantae
- Clade: Tracheophytes
- Clade: Angiosperms
- Clade: Eudicots
- Order: Caryophyllales
- Family: Cactaceae
- Subfamily: Cactoideae
- Tribe: Echinocereeae
- Genus: Neoraimondia; Britton & Rose

Type species
- Neoraimondia arequipensis

Species
- See text.

Synonyms
- Neocardenasia Backeb.

= Neoraimondia =

Genus of cacti

Neoraimondia is a genus of medium to large cacti from Peru. The genus is named after the Italian-born Peruvian explorer, naturalist, and scientist, Antonio Raimondi.

== Description ==
The plants of the genus Neoraimondia are shrubby to tree-like, candelabra-like columnar cactus are branched from the base and reach a height of up to 15 meters. The upright, usually gray-green stems reach a diameter of up to 40 centimeters. Their 4 to 8 ribs are widely spaced. The large, round to elongated areoles are cone-like short shoots. These short shoots, viewed as condensed inflorescences, are among the longest living inflorescences known. They are felty brown, thorny and continue to grow for many years. The up to 12 (or more) spines that are flexible and up to 25 centimeters long.

The funnel-shaped flowers are pink or cream in color, they arise from elongated spurs and open during the day. The flowers are funnel-shaped, felt-like areoles and sometimes bristles.

The spherical fruits have brown felted areoles that have short thorns. The black seeds are finely dotted and are surrounded by a slimy covering.

== Distribution ==
The genus Neoraimondia is distributed in the dry areas along the Peruvian coast and in the Andes of Peru and Bolivia.

== Taxonomy ==
The genus was first described in 1920 by Nathaniel Lord Britton and Joseph Nelson Rose. They assigned it as the only species to the species Pilocereus macrostibas described by Karl Moritz Schumann in 1903. However, Curt Backeberg was able to show that the plant was already described in 1834 by Franz Julius Ferdinand Meyen as Cereus arequipensis. Its correct name is therefore Neoraimondia arequipensis.

The type species of the genus is Neoraimondia macrostibas, a synonym of Neoraimondia arequipensis.

=== Species ===
As of January 2023, Plants of the World Online accepted two species:

Image	Scientific name	Distribution
	Neoraimondia arequipensis	Peru
	Neoraimondia herzogiana	Bolivia

== Pharmacology ==
It is a psychoactive cactus and its different species have been known to contain the chemicals 3,5-Dimethoxy-4-hydroxyphenethylamine and 3,4-Dimethoxyphenethylamine. It is mixed into a hallucinogenic beverage called "cimora" along with Echinopsis pachanoi (syn. Trichocereus pachanoi).
