= Iresine chrysotricha =

Conservation status
- Endangered (IUCN 3.1)

Scientific classification
- Kingdom: Plantae
- Clade: Embryophytes
- Clade: Tracheophytes
- Clade: Spermatophytes
- Clade: Angiosperms
- Clade: Eudicots
- Order: Caryophyllales
- Family: Amaranthaceae
- Genus: Iresine
- Species: I. chrysotricha

Binomial name
- Iresine chrysotricha (Suess.) Borsch, Flores Olv. & Kai Müll.

Synonyms
- Irenella chrysotricha Suess.

Species of flowering plant

Iresine chrysotricha, synonym Irenella chrysotricha, is a species of plant in the family Amaranthaceae. It is endemic to Ecuador. Its natural habitats are subtropical or tropical dry forests and subtropical or tropical moist lowland forests. It is threatened by habitat loss.
