= Iresine heterophylla =

Scientific classification
- Kingdom: Plantae
- Clade: Tracheophytes
- Clade: Angiosperms
- Clade: Eudicots
- Order: Caryophyllales
- Family: Amaranthaceae
- Genus: Iresine
- Species: I. heterophylla

Binomial name
- Iresine heterophylla Standley

Species of flowering plant

Iresine heterophylla, or Standley's bloodleaf, is a plant species native to the southwestern United States and also to Mexico. It has been collected from Arizona, New Mexico, Texas, Chihuahua, Sonora, Durango, Coahuila, Nuevo León, Campeche and Tabasco.

Iresine heterophylla is a perennial herb up to 100 cm tall. Leaves are opposite, ovate, up to 6 cm long. Flowers are arranged in a rather large, branching panicle up to 40 cm long. Flowers are small, white to straw-colored, up to 4 cm across, covered in dense woolly hairs. Fruits are green, egg-shaped, usually less than 1 mm across, enclosed inside the persistent flower parts which are in turn enclosed in woolly hairs, so that the infructescence as a whole appears white and woolly.
