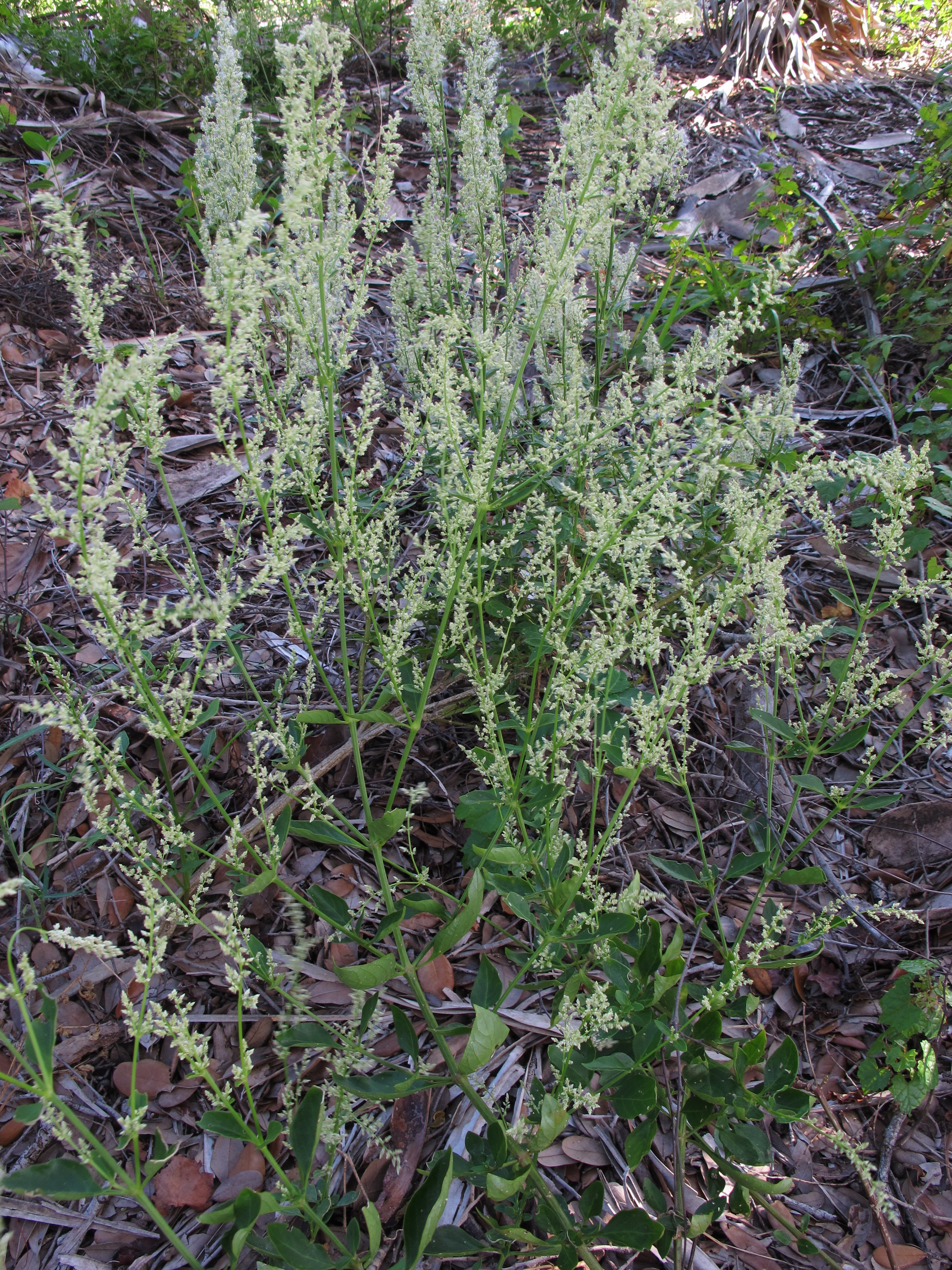

Conservation status
- Apparently Secure (NatureServe)

Scientific classification
- Kingdom: Plantae
- Clade: Tracheophytes
- Clade: Angiosperms
- Clade: Eudicots
- Order: Caryophyllales
- Family: Amaranthaceae
- Genus: Iresine
- Species: I. diffusa

Binomial name
- Iresine diffusa Humb. & Bonpl. ex Willd.

= Iresine diffusa =

Species of flowering plant

Iresine diffusa, or Juba's bush, is a species of plant in the family Amaranthaceae. Its form Iresine diffusa f. lindenii, formerly Iresine lindenii, is commercially available as an ornamental.

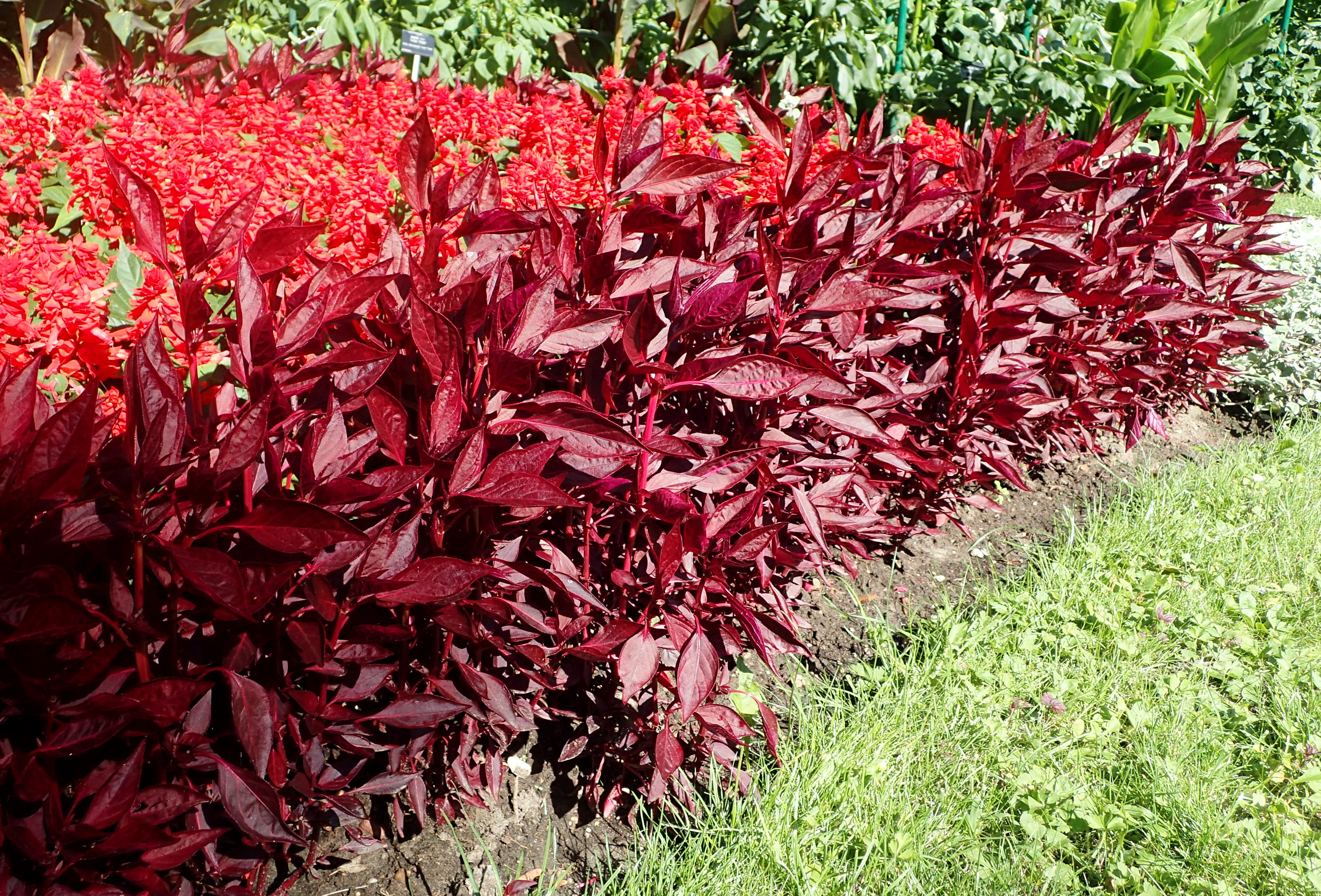
Planting of Iresine diffusa f. lindenii

== Appearance ==
Herb 1–2 m, stem a little grooved, nodes jointed. Leaves opp, 14 x 7 cm, edge smooth. Flowers minute, greenish-white, panicle 40 cm long, male more open, female compact, 1 mm. Seed 0.5 mm.

== Folk use ==
It is used to treat ovary inflammation in Peru.

== Chemistry ==
Drimenes in aerial parts.
