= Iresine pedicellata =

Conservation status
- Vulnerable (IUCN 3.1)

Scientific classification
- Kingdom: Plantae
- Clade: Tracheophytes
- Clade: Angiosperms
- Clade: Eudicots
- Order: Caryophyllales
- Family: Amaranthaceae
- Genus: Iresine
- Species: I. pedicellata

Binomial name
- Iresine pedicellata Eliasson

Species of flowering plant

Iresine pedicellata is a species of plant in the family Amaranthaceae. It is endemic to Ecuador. Its natural habitat is subtropical or tropical dry forests. It is threatened by habitat loss.
