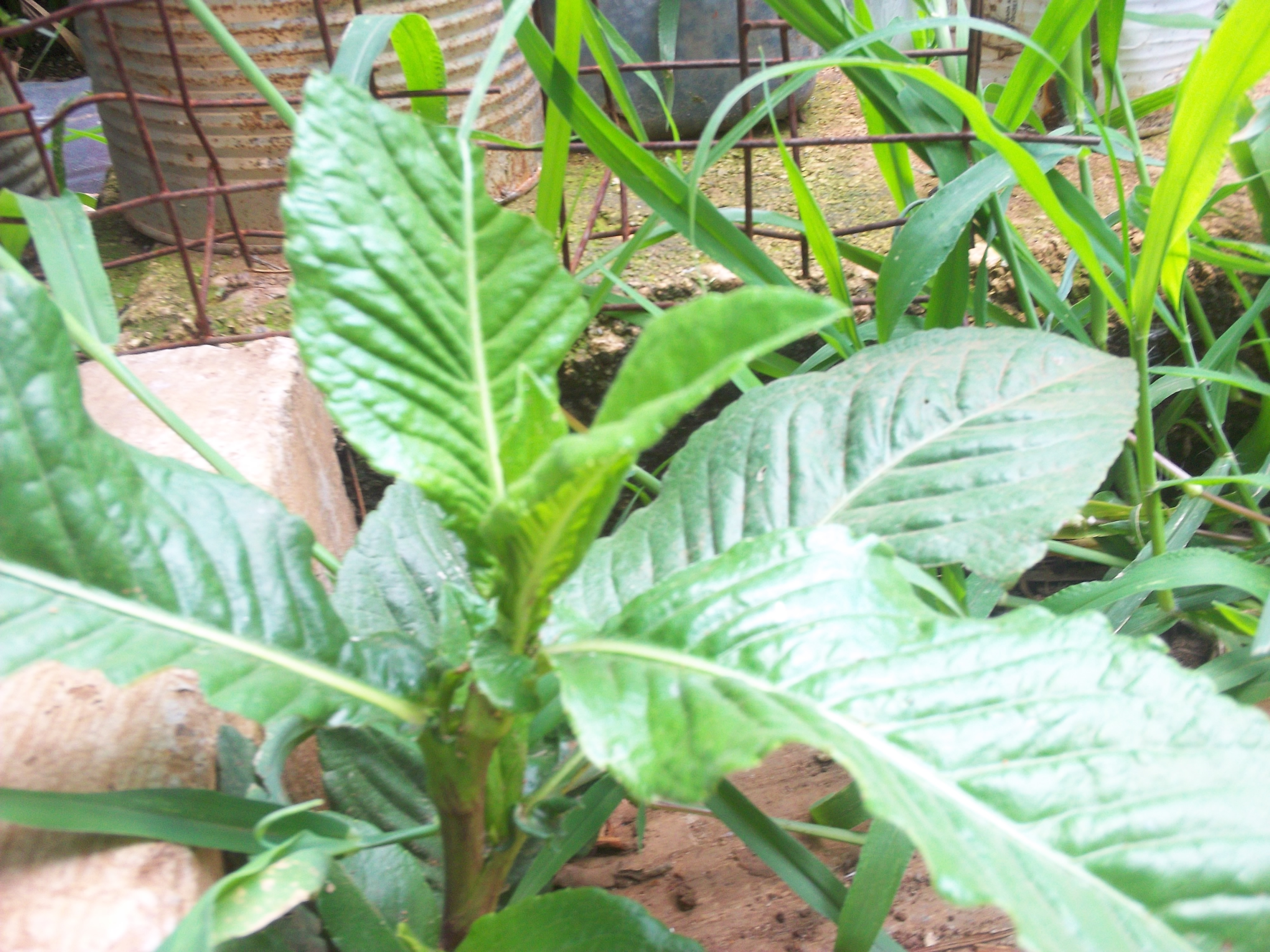

Scientific classification
- Kingdom: Plantae
- Clade: Tracheophytes
- Clade: Angiosperms
- Clade: Eudicots
- Order: Caryophyllales
- Family: Amaranthaceae
- Genus: Iresine
- Species: I. angustifolia

Binomial name
- Iresine angustifolia Euphrasén

= Iresine angustifolia =

Species of flowering plant

Iresine angustifolia (common name in English: white snowplant, in Spanish: arlomo) is a plant in the genus Iresine of the family Amaranthaceae.

== Description ==
It is an herbaceous plant; it usually grows to 1.5 meters. in most cases it has many branches with leaves between 5 and 10 cm long, its shape varies form linear ovate to lance-shaped.

== Distribution ==
Iresine angustifolia occurs in the southwestern part of the United States, Mexico, Central America, South America, West Indies and some islands of the Caribbean. It can be found at middle to lower altitudes usually on banks near the coast but also on thickets and on dry districts.

== Uses ==
It is not cultivated, however it is considered useful in traditional herbal medicine in treating the bites of the insect also known as arlomo.

== Taxonomy ==
In 1788, it was first identified by Bengt Anders Euphrasén on Saint Barthélemy. He published a detailed description of the plant in a book about the condition and flora of the Island. It was first published in Swedish in 1975 and then in German in 1978.

== Common name ==
In Mexico its common name is arlomo.
