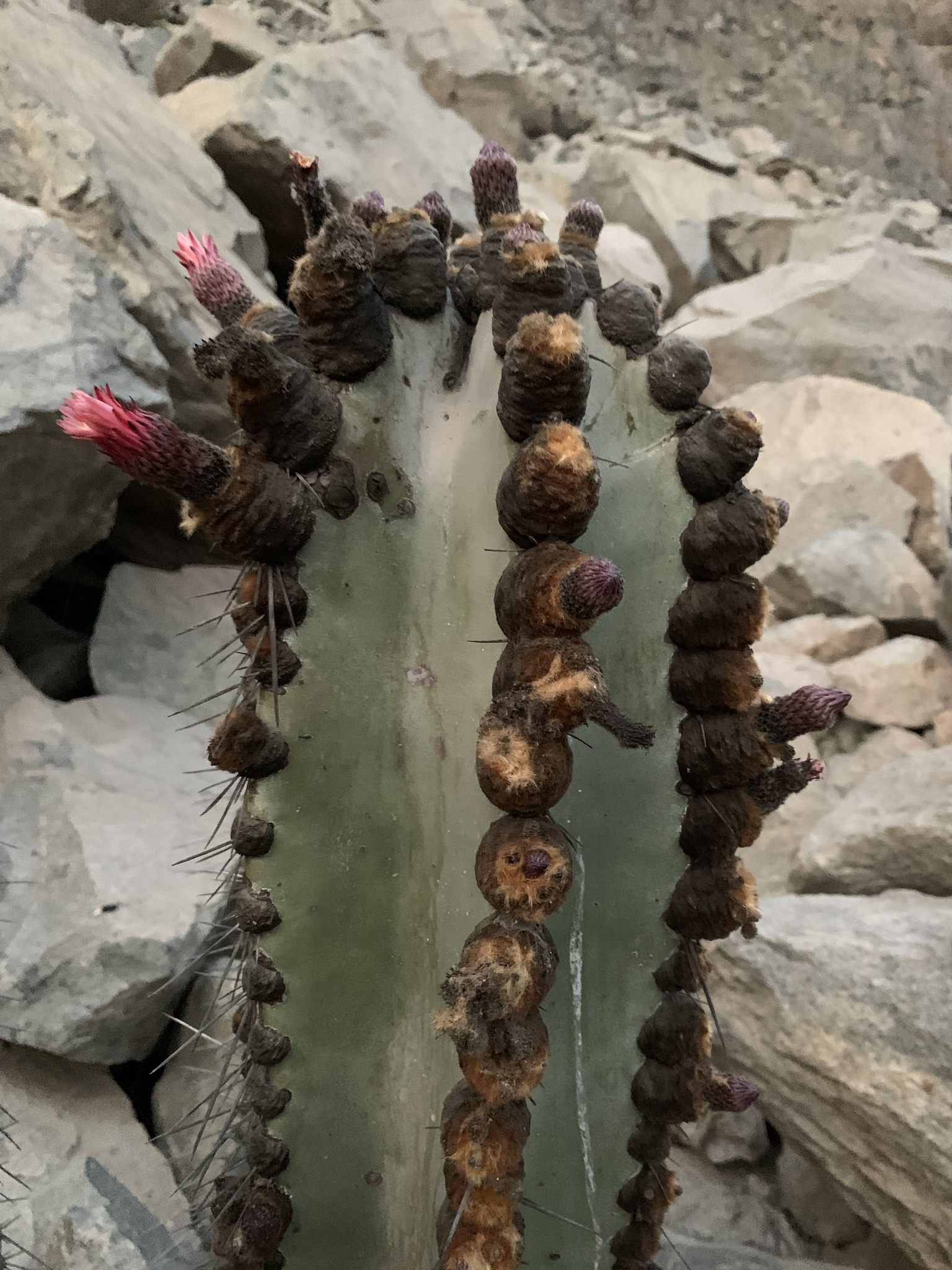

Conservation status
- Least Concern (IUCN 3.1)

Scientific classification
- Kingdom: Plantae
- Clade: Tracheophytes
- Clade: Angiosperms
- Clade: Eudicots
- Order: Caryophyllales
- Family: Cactaceae
- Subfamily: Cactoideae
- Genus: Neoraimondia
- Species: N. arequipensis

Binomial name
- Neoraimondia arequipensis (Meyen) Backeb. 1835

Synonyms
- Cereus arequipensis Meyen; Cereus macrostibas (Schum.) A.Berger; Cereus macrostibas var. roseiflorus Werderm. & Backeb.; Neoraimondia arequipensis var. aticensis Rauh & Backeb.; Neoraimondia arequipensis var. rhodantha Rauh & Backeb.; Neoraimondia arequipensis var. riomajensis Rauh & Backeb.; Neoraimondia arequipensis subsp. roseiflora (Werderm. & Backeb.) Ostolaza; Neoraimondia aticensis Rauh & Backeb.; Neoraimondia gigantea (Backeb.) Backeb., nom. illeg.; Neoraimondia gigantea Backeb.; Neoraimondia gigantea var. saniensis Rauh & Backeb.; Neoraimondia macrostibas (K.Schum.) Britton & Rose; Neoraimondia macrostibas var. gigantea Backeb.; Neoraimondia macrostibas var. roseiflora Backeb.; Neoraimondia roseiflora (Backeb.) Backeb., nom. illeg.; Neoraimondia roseiflora Backeb.; Pilocereus macrostibas K.Schum.

= Neoraimondia arequipensis =

Species of cactus

Neoraimondia arequipensis, also known as Neoraimondia macrostibas, is a tree-like cactus native to western Peru. It was first described in 1835 as Cereus arequipensis.

== Description ==
Neoraimondia arequipensis grows like a shrub, branches at the base, and does not form a stem. The large, upright shoots can reach heights of up to 10 m (33 ft), with a diameter of up to 40 cm (16 in). There are 5 to 8 ribs. The cone-like, conspicuous areoles can grow to be up to 5 cm (2.0 in) long. Some thorns are known to be as large as 25 centimetres long, with up to 7 thorns per areole.

The species has the largest areoles of any cactus; up to 10 cm (4 in) long and less than half as wide. From these emerge spines up to 24 cm (9.4 in) long. It is also the source of an ingredient in the psychoactive beverage cimora.

The greenish-white to pink-red flowers reach a diameter of up to 3 cm (1.2 in). Their pericarpel is studded with short hairs, and sometimes inconspicuous spines. The round fruits are purple and have a diameter of up to 7 cm (2.8 in). They are covered with brownish, felt-like areoles with short thorns.

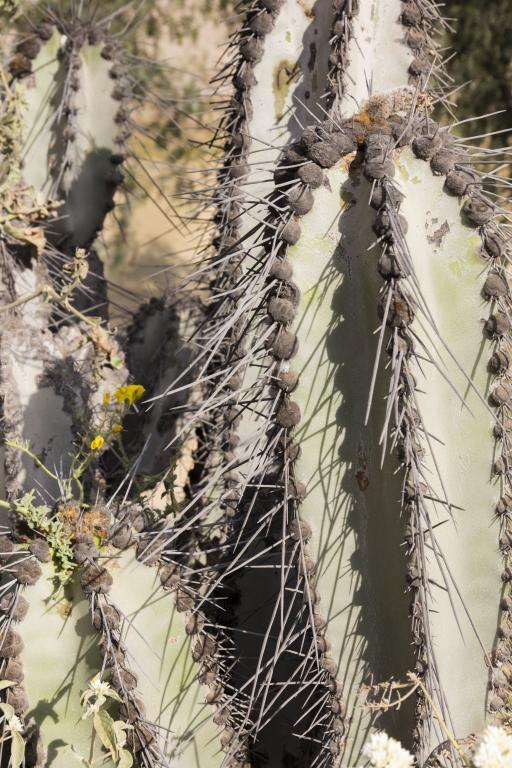
Stem with spines

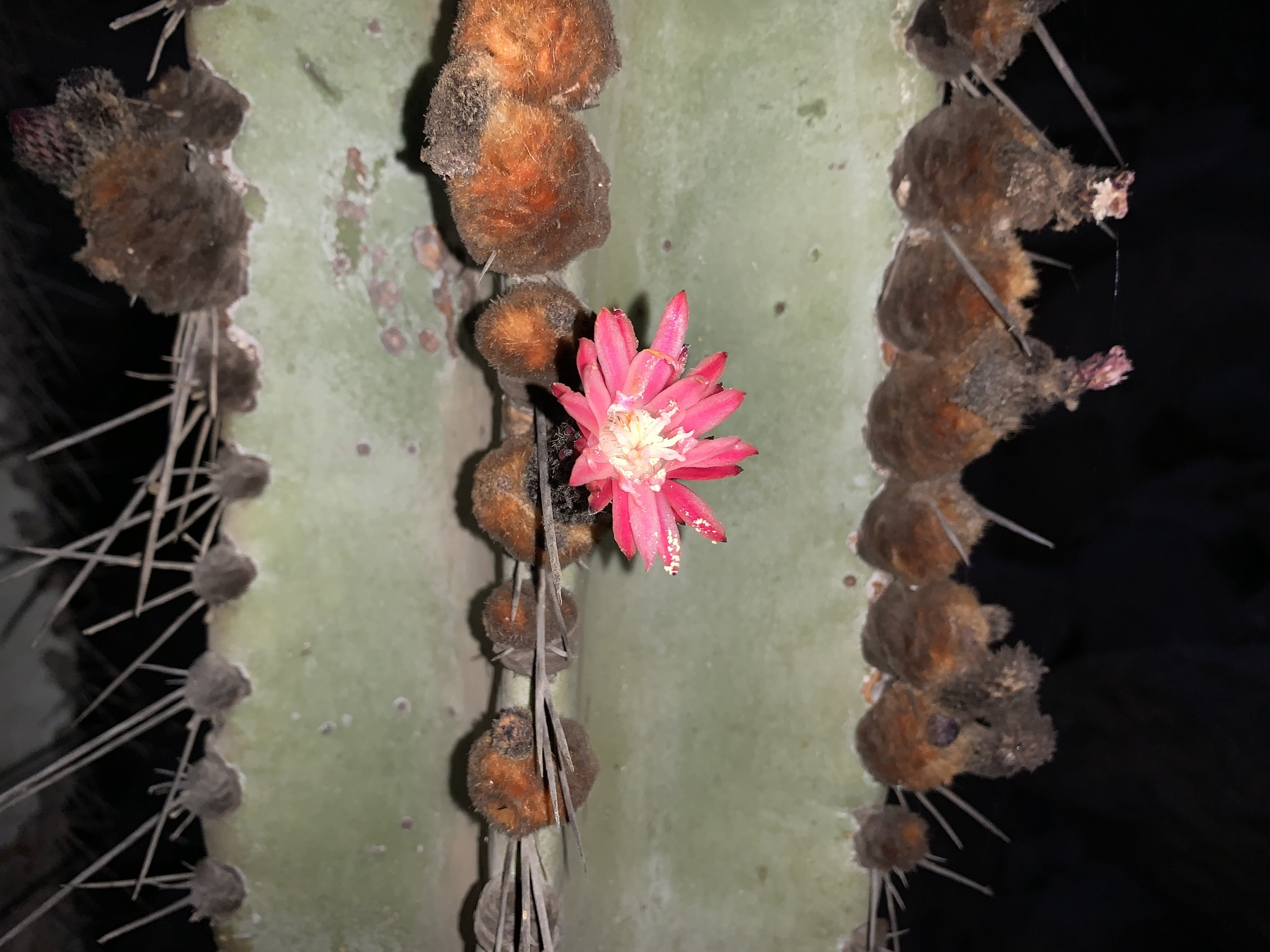
Flower

== Distribution ==
Neoraimondia arequipensis is endemic to Peru, where it is found in many regions of the country, including Arequipa, Ayacucho, Cajamarca, Hauncavelica, Lima, Lambayique and Piura. It commonly grows in rocky coastal habitats, desert scrub and inter-Andean valleys at altitudes of between 0 and 2,800 meters above sea level.

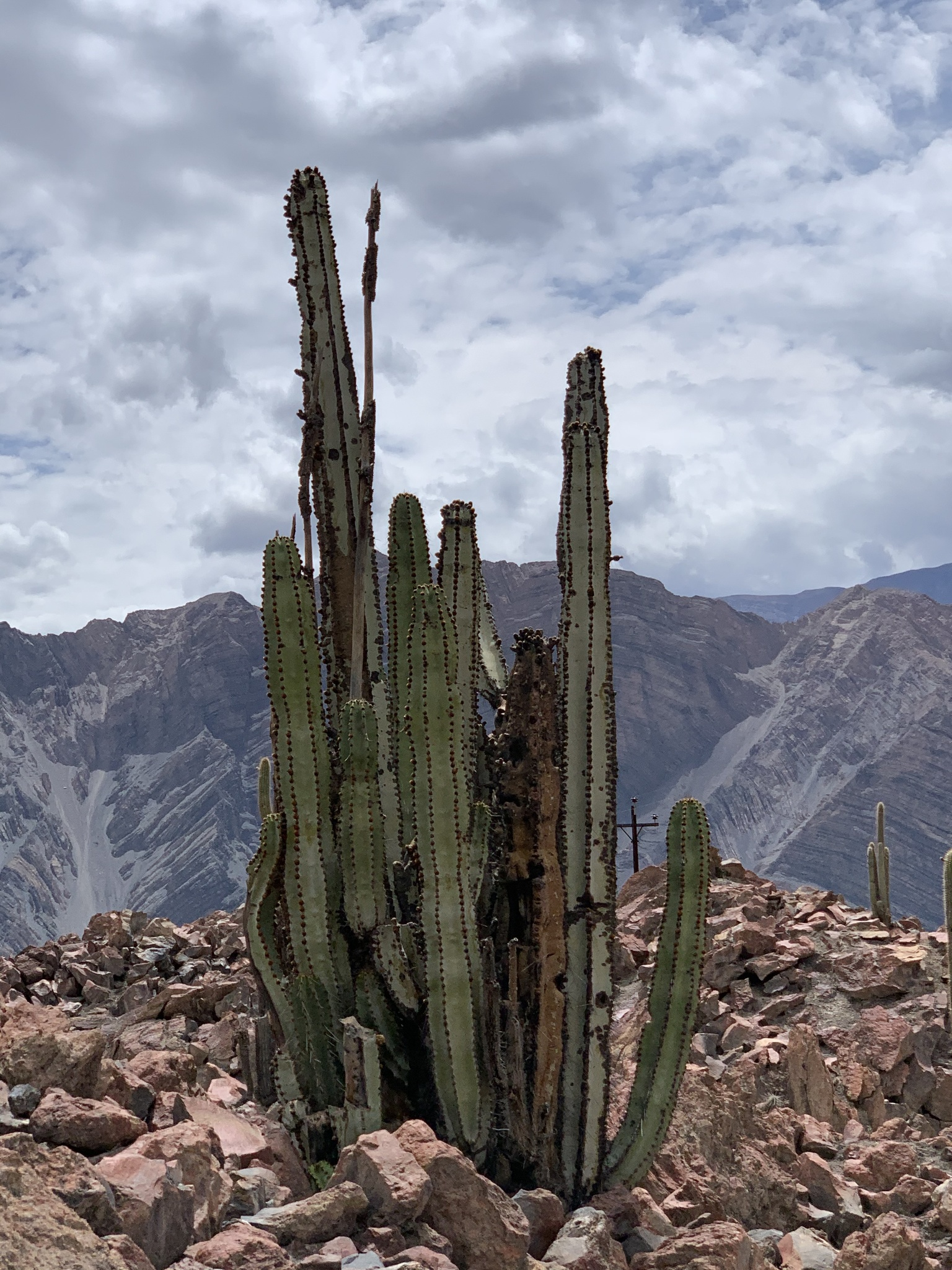
Plant growing in Ayo, Peru

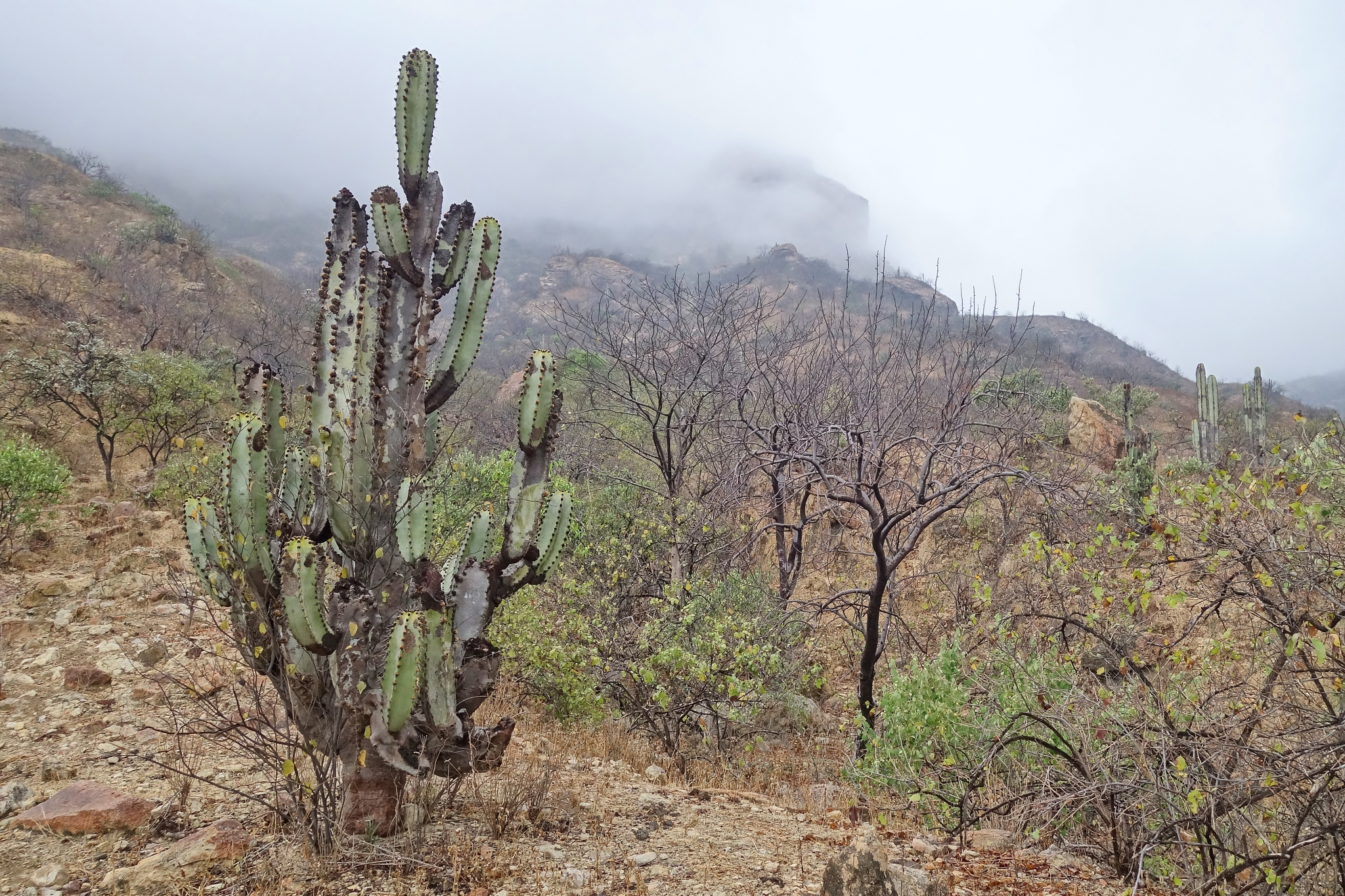
Habitat in Salas, Peru

== Taxonomy ==
The species was first described as Cereus arequipensis in 1833 by Franz Julius Ferdinand Meyen who named it after the Peruvian city of Arequipa where it was discovered. It was later placed in the genus Neoraimondia by Curt Backeberg in 1937.

== Conservation status ==
This species is listed as "least concern" on the IUCN Red List of Threatened Species. It is widely distributed and has a stable population, however in the southern part of its distribution, it faces localised threats such as harvesting for firewood, harvesting for medicinal purposes and habitat clearing for mining. These threats are insufficient to warrant a higher threat category.

== Uses ==
N. arequipensis is harvested for firewood for brick ovens. It is also used as a medicinal plant, where the epidermis is used as a remedy for menopause. It is also used locally as an ornamental plant.
