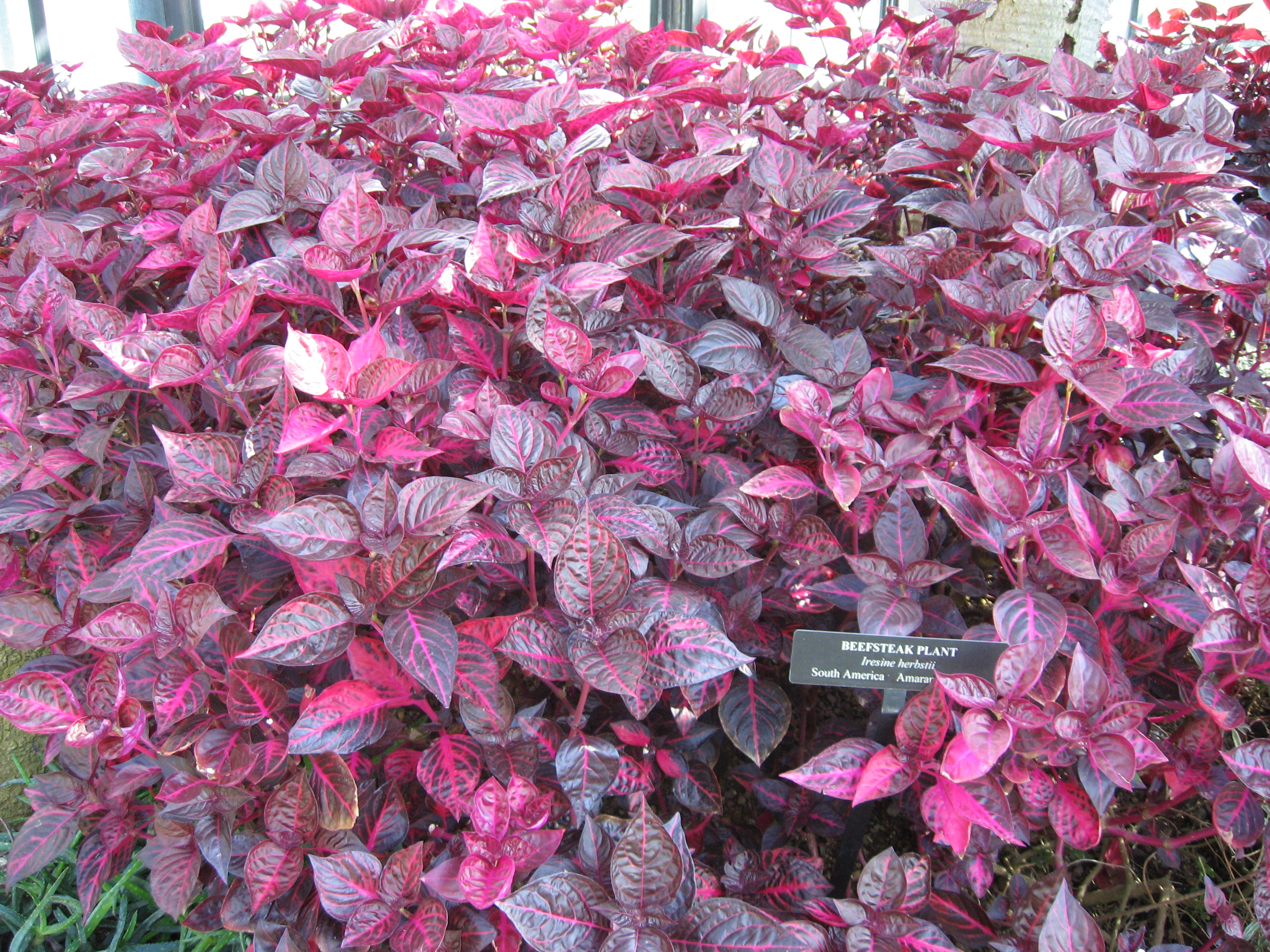

Scientific classification
- Kingdom: Plantae
- Clade: Tracheophytes
- Clade: Angiosperms
- Clade: Eudicots
- Order: Caryophyllales
- Family: Amaranthaceae
- Genus: Iresine
- Species: I. herbstii

Binomial name
- Iresine herbstii Hook.

Synonyms
- Iresine diffusa f. herbstii (Hook.) Pedersen

= Iresine herbstii =

Species of flowering plant

Iresine herbstii, or Herbst's bloodleaf, is a species of flowering plant in the family Amaranthaceae that is native to Brazil. Some call this plant the chicken gizzard plant and beefsteak plant.

== Description ==
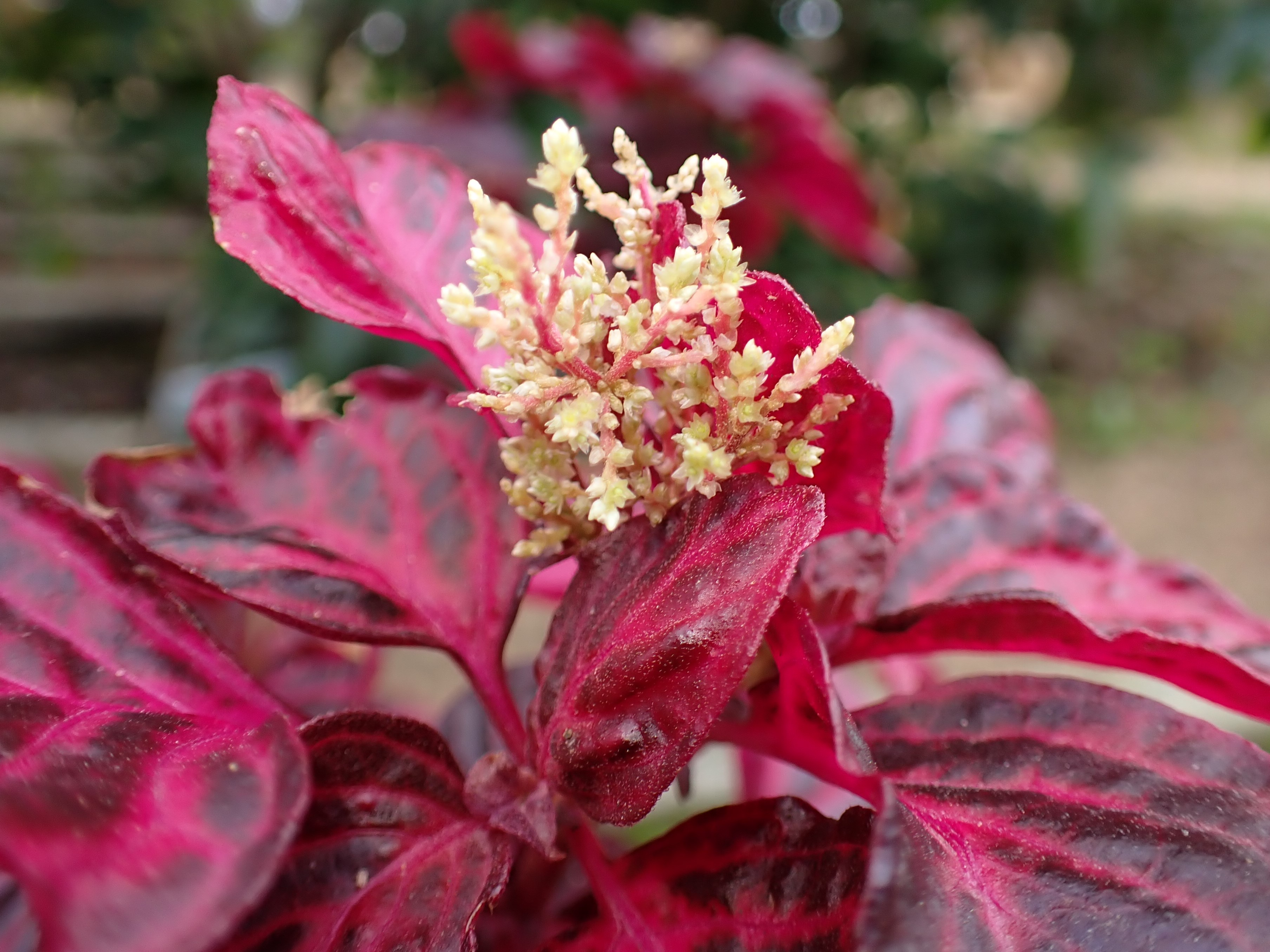
Stalkless inflorescences

It is an evergreen, perennial herbaceous plant that can reach heights of 1 to 2 meters; in cultivation it is pruned to a height of a few decimeters. All parts of the plant can be more or less reddish, depending on the variety. The plants are hairy with multicellular trichomes. The fleshy, mostly reddish stems are branched and upright to creeping. The opposite leaves are stalked and simple. The petioles are 2 to 3 cm long. The circular, egg-shaped to heart-shaped leaf blades are 2 to 6 cm long. The leaf veins are often lighter than the rest of the leaf surface, which gives some varieties an attractive leaf pattern. The leaf tip can be pointed to the bifid. The leaf edge is smooth.

Iresine herbstii are dioecious. Terminal and lateral, compound inflorescences are formed, which are made up of spike-like partial inflorescences with many flowers; they are up to 20 cm long. The membranous, shiny bracts and bracts are egg-shaped and 1 to 1.5 mm long. The very small, stalkless flowers are unisexual. There are only five membranous, about 1 to 1.25 mm large perianth leaves; they are usually white, yellowish-white or greenish. The male flowers usually have five fertile stamens. The stamens are fused at their base. The spherical, somewhat compressed ovary contains only one ovule. There is at most a short (about 0.2 mm) style. The fruits are spherical to compressed and contain only one seed.

== Cultivation ==
Its leaves make it a popular ornamental plant. There are many varieties whose leaves or most parts of the plant are green, red or purple. For example, Iresine herbstii aureoreticulata is green, but mixed colors are also possible. It is often found in gardens, but it cannot tolerate cold and is kept cool in the home or greenhouse over the winter. It is therefore most commonly seen as a potted plant for the windowsill. If Iresine herbstii suffers from drought, it can react much more sensitively than other plants and become extremely limp, but it regains its turgor pressure as soon as it has water available again.

It can be easily propagated by cuttings. It also quickly takes root in a glass of water (not only at the node, but at various points on the stem). It is often cultivated as an annual and repeatedly re-grown.

== Gallery ==
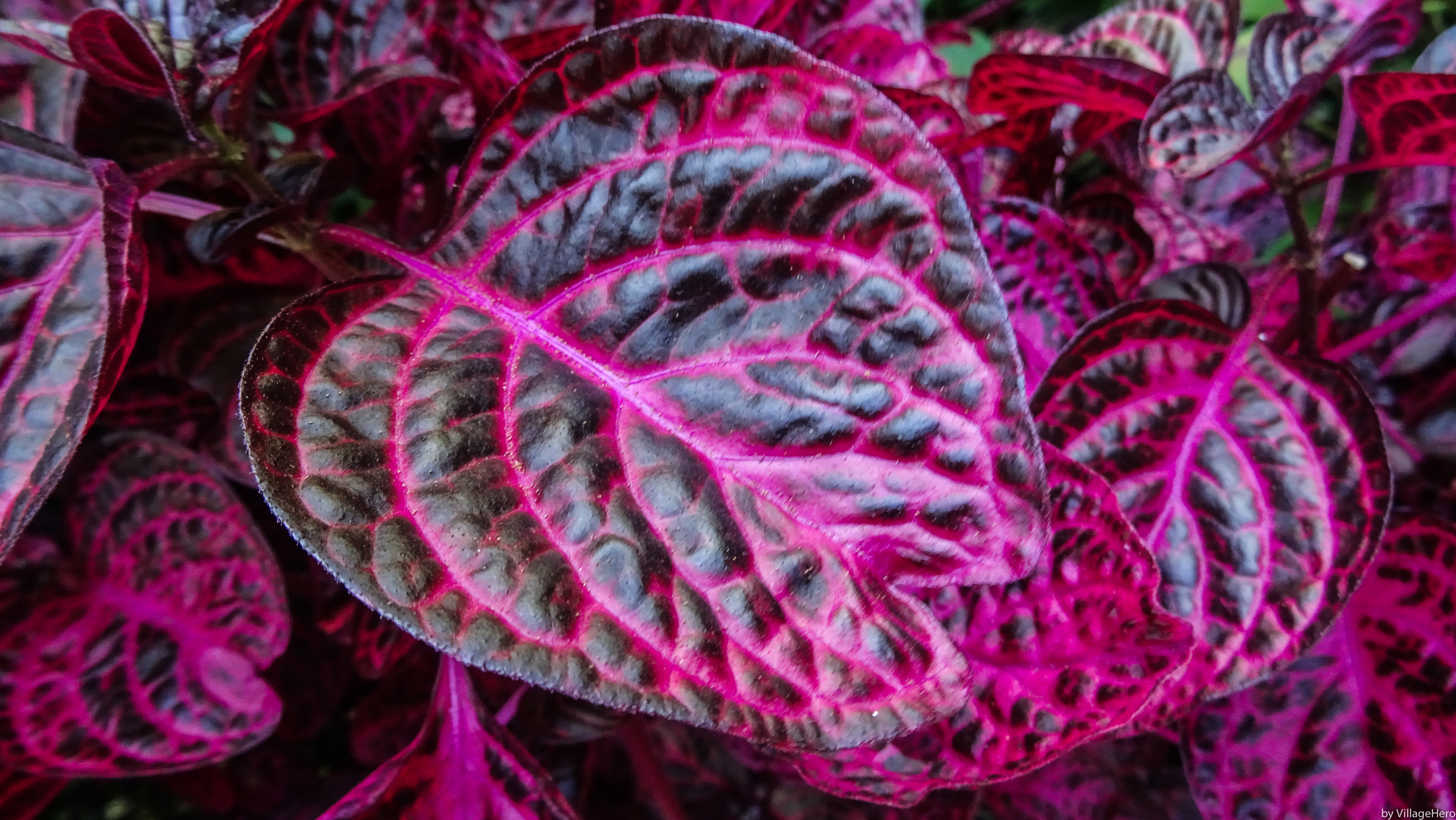
Iresine herbstii in Funchal, Madeira

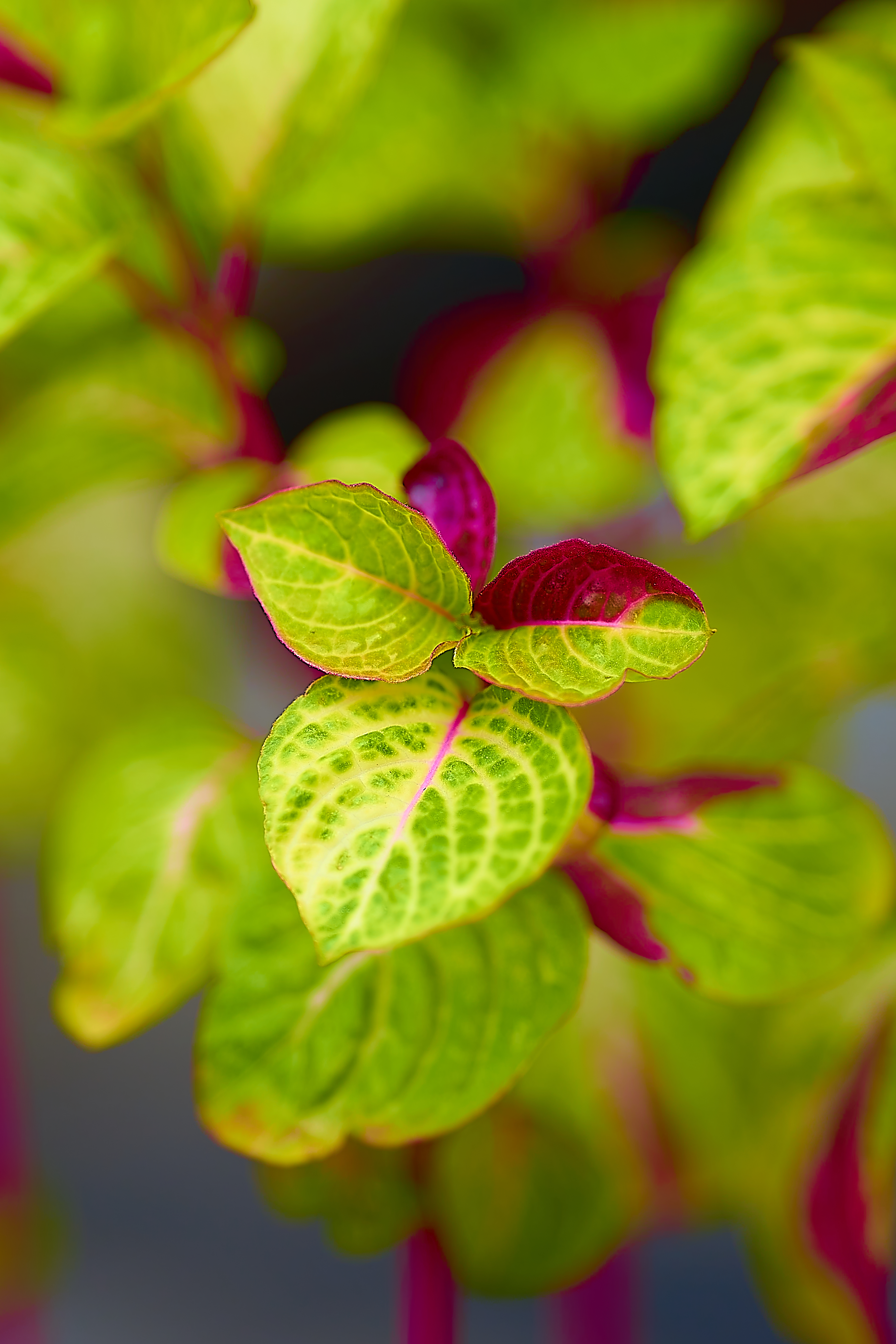
Iresine herbstii in Athens, Greece

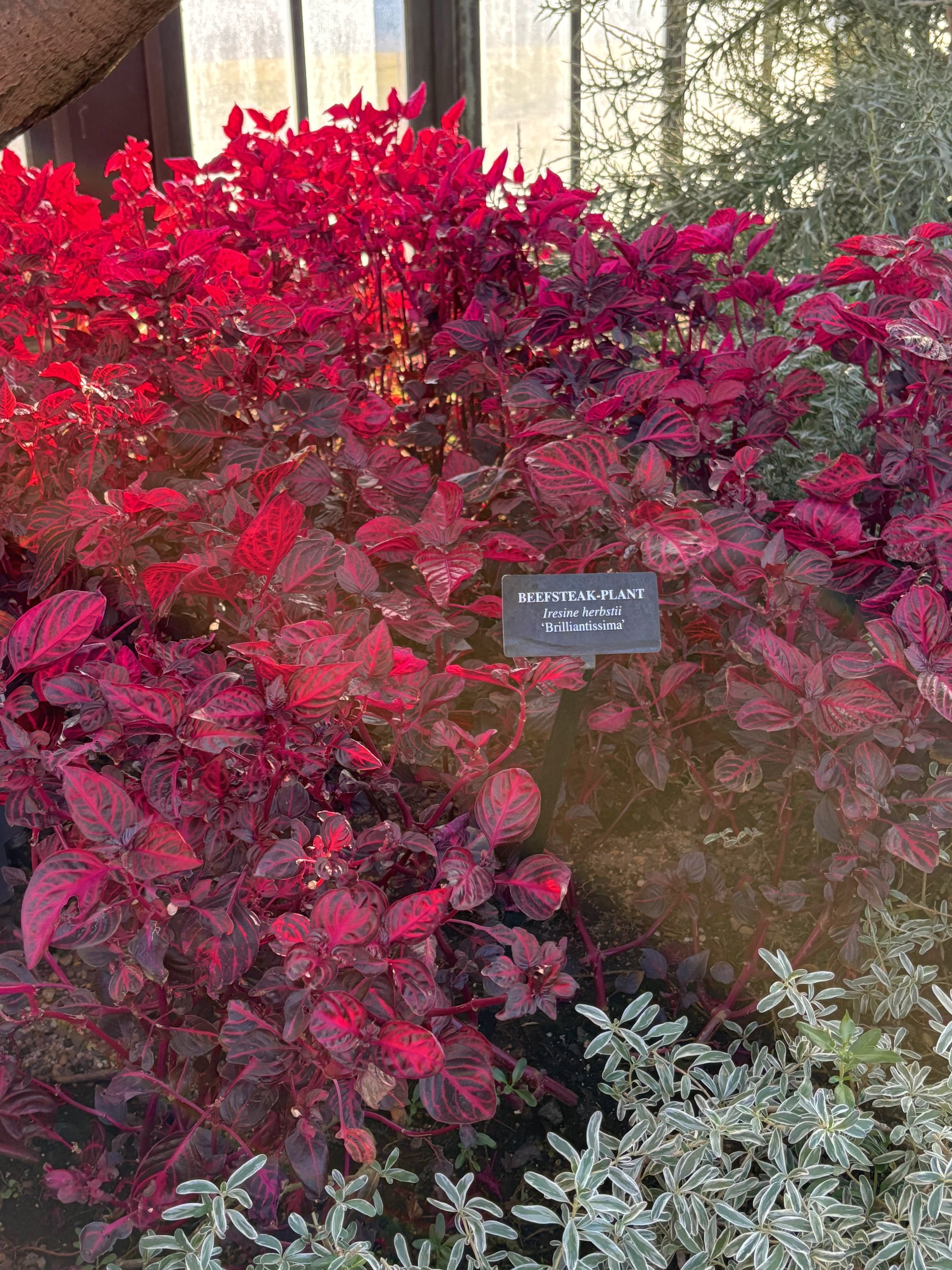
Iresine herbstii at Longwood Gardens in Pennsylvania, USA
