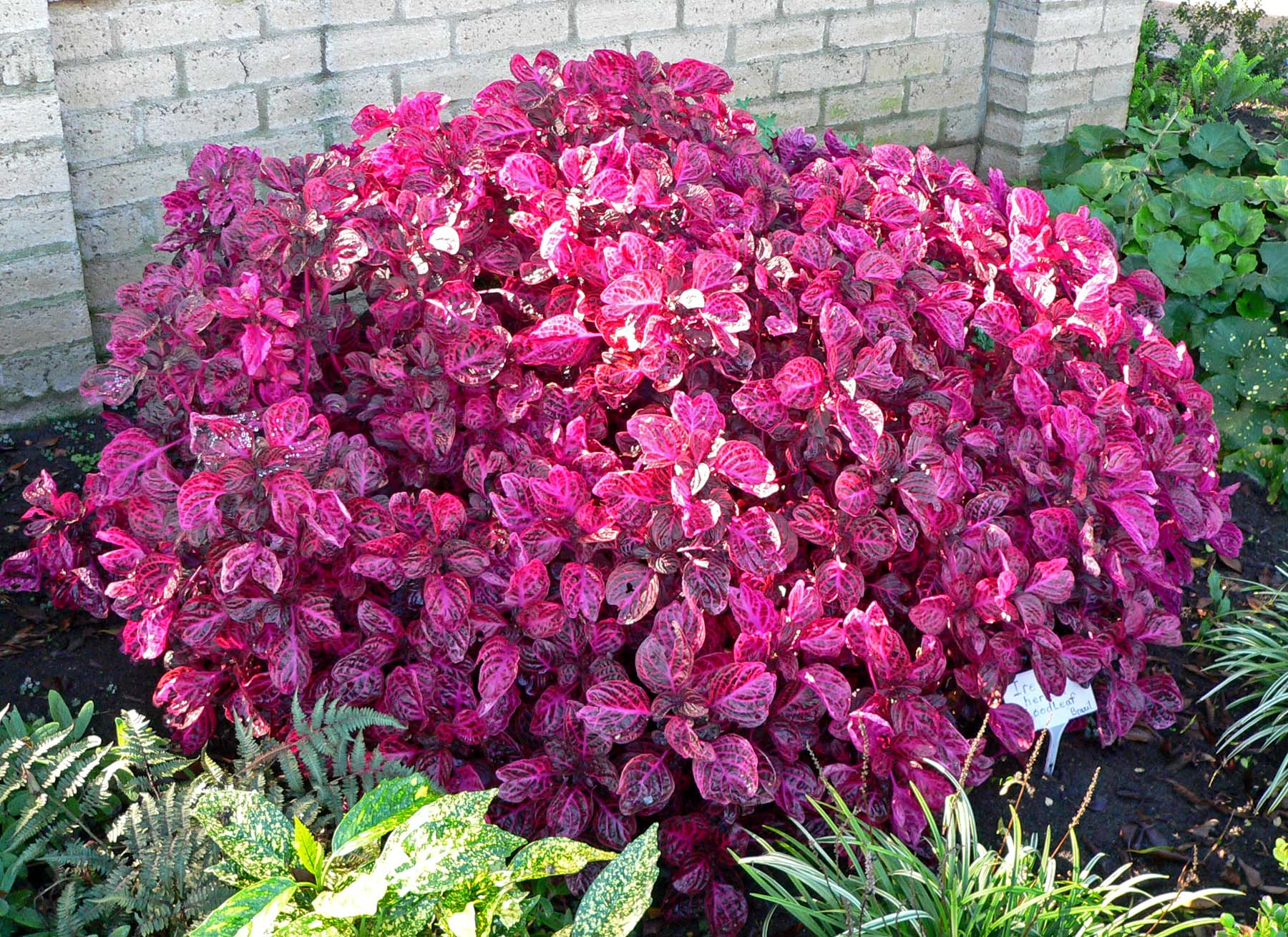
- Iresine herbstii

Scientific classification
- Kingdom: Plantae
- Clade: Tracheophytes
- Clade: Angiosperms
- Clade: Eudicots
- Order: Caryophyllales
- Family: Amaranthaceae
- Subfamily: Gomphrenoideae
- Genus: Iresine; P.Browne

Species
- See text.

Synonyms
- Crucita L.; Cruzeta Loefl.; Dicraurus Hook.f.; Gonufas Raf.; Ireneis Moq.; Irenella Suess.; Rosea Mart.; Woehleria Griseb.; Xerandra Raf.

= Iresine =

Genus of flowering plants

Iresine is a genus of flowering plants in the family Amaranthaceae. It contains 20 to 25 species, all of which are native to the American tropics. The generic name is derived from the Greek word εριος (erios), meaning "wooly", referring to the trichome-covered flowers. Bloodleaf is a common name for those species that have colored foliage, and these are often cultivated as ornamental plants. Some species are additives to versions of the hallucinogenic drink ayahuasca.

== Species ==
As of April 2022, Plants of the World Online accepted the following species:

- Iresine ajuscana Suess. & Beyerle
- Iresine alternifolia S.Watson
- Iresine angustifolia Euphrasén – White snowplant
- Iresine arbuscula Uline & W.L.Bray
- Iresine arrecta Standl.
- Iresine borschii Zumaya & Flores Olv.
- Iresine cassiniiformis S.Schauer
- Iresine chrysotricha (Suess.) Borsch, Flores Olv. & Kai Müll.
- Iresine cubensis Borsch, Flores Olv. & Kai Müll.
- Iresine diffusa Humb. & Bonpl. ex Willd. (= Iresine celosia, Iresine celosioides, Iresine canescens, Iresine paniculata (L.) Kuntze, Iresine elongata) – Juba's bush
- Iresine discolor Greenm.
- Iresine domingensis Urb.
- Iresine flavescens Humb. & Bonpl. ex Willd. – Yellow bloodleaf
- Iresine flavopilosa Suess.
- Iresine hartmanii Uline
- Iresine hebanthoides Suess.
- Iresine herbstii Hook. ex Lindl. – Herbst's bloodleaf
- Iresine heterophylla Standl. – Standley's bloodleaf
- Iresine interrupta Benth.
- Iresine jaliscana Uline & W.L.Bray
- Iresine latifolia (M.Martens & Galeotti) Benth. & Hook.f.
- Iresine laurifolia Suess.
- Iresine leptoclada (Hook.f.) Henrickson & S.D.Sundb. – Texas shrub
- Iresine nigra Uline & W.L.Bray
- Iresine orientalis G.L.Nesom
- Iresine palmeri (S.Watson) Standl. – Palmer's bloodleaf
- Iresine pedicellata Eliasson (Ecuador)
- Iresine pringlei S.Watson
- Iresine rhizomatosa Standl. – Rootstock bloodleaf
- Iresine rotundifolia Standl.
- Iresine rzedowskii Zumaya, Flores Olv. & Borsch
- Iresine schaffneri S.Watson
- Iresine sousae Zumaya, Borsch & Flores Olv.
- Iresine stricta Standl.
- Iresine valdesii Zumaya, Flores Olv. & Borsch

=== Formerly placed here ===
- Aerva javanica (Burm.f.) Juss. ex Schult. (as I. javanica Burm.f. or I. persica Burm.f.)
- Hebanthe grandiflora (Hook.) Borsch & Pedersen (as I. grandiflora Hook.)
- Pedersenia macrophylla (R.E.Fr.) Holub (as I. macrophylla R.E.Fr.)
- Pedersenia argentata (Mart.) Holub (as I. argentata (Mart.) D.Dietr. or I. elatior Sieber ex Moq.)
- Pfaffia glomerata (A.Spreng.) Pedersen (as I. glomerata A.Spreng.)
