= Trans-Mexican Volcanic Belt pine–oak forests =

Tropical and subtropical coniferous forests ecoregion in Mexico

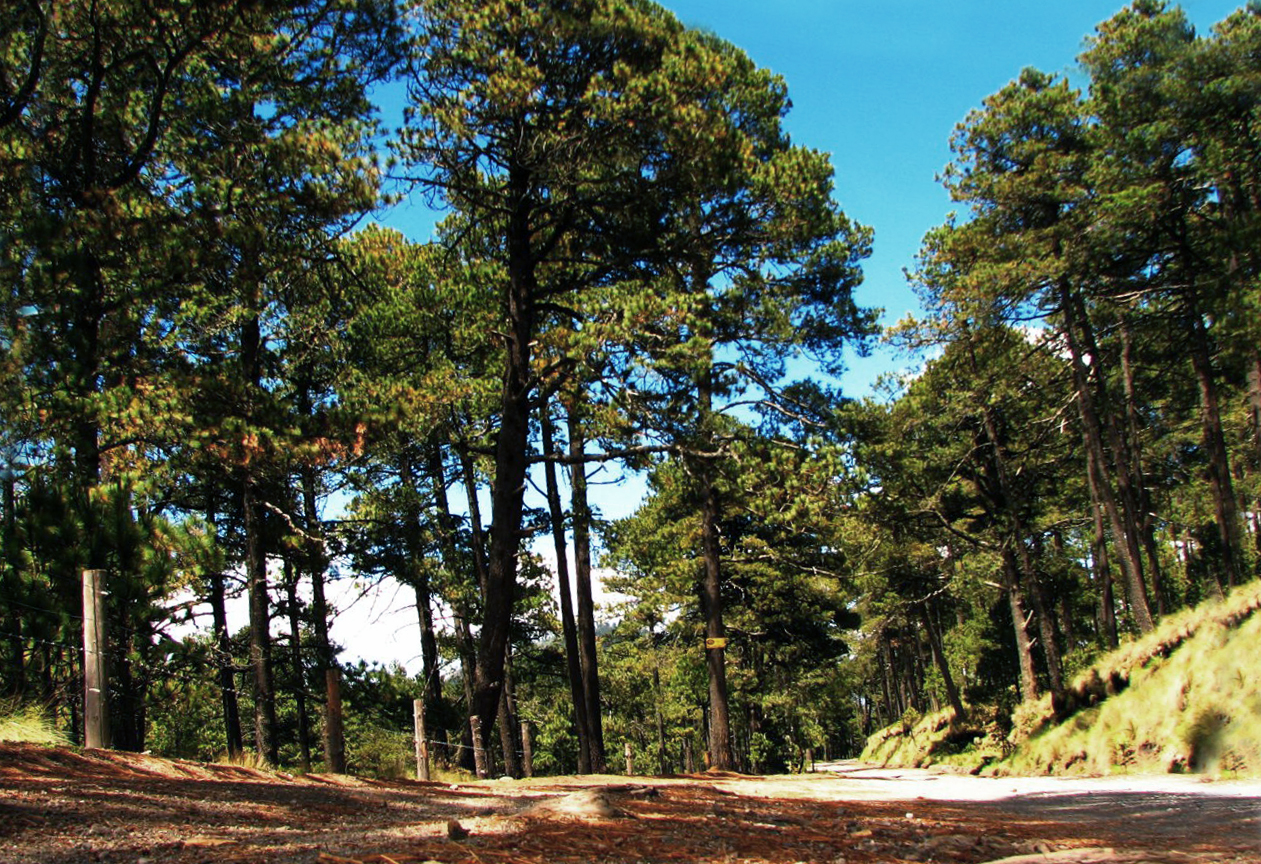
- pine–oak forest in Iztaccíhuatl–Popocatépetl National Park, Puebla state

- location of the Trans-Mexican Volcanic Belt pine–oak forests ecoregion

Ecology
- Realm: Neotropical
- Biome: Tropical and subtropical coniferous forests
- Borders: List: Jalisco dry forests; Balsas dry forests; Bajío dry forests; Central Mexican matorral; Veracruz montane forests; Tehuacán Valley matorral; Central Mexican matorral; Veracruz montane forests; Oaxacan montane forests; Zacatonal

Geography
- Area: 92,503 km^{2} (35,716 mi^{2})
- Country: Mexico
- States: List: Aguascalientes; Colima; Guanajuato; Guerrero; Hidalgo; Jalisco; Mexico; Mexico City; Michoacan; Morelos; Nayarit; Puebla; Querétaro; San Luis Potosí; Tlaxcala; Veracruz; Zacatecas

Conservation
- Conservation status: Critical/endangered
- Protected: 17.85%

The Trans-Mexican Volcanic Belt pine–oak forests is a subtropical coniferous forest ecoregion of the Trans-Mexican Volcanic Belt of central Mexico.

== Setting ==
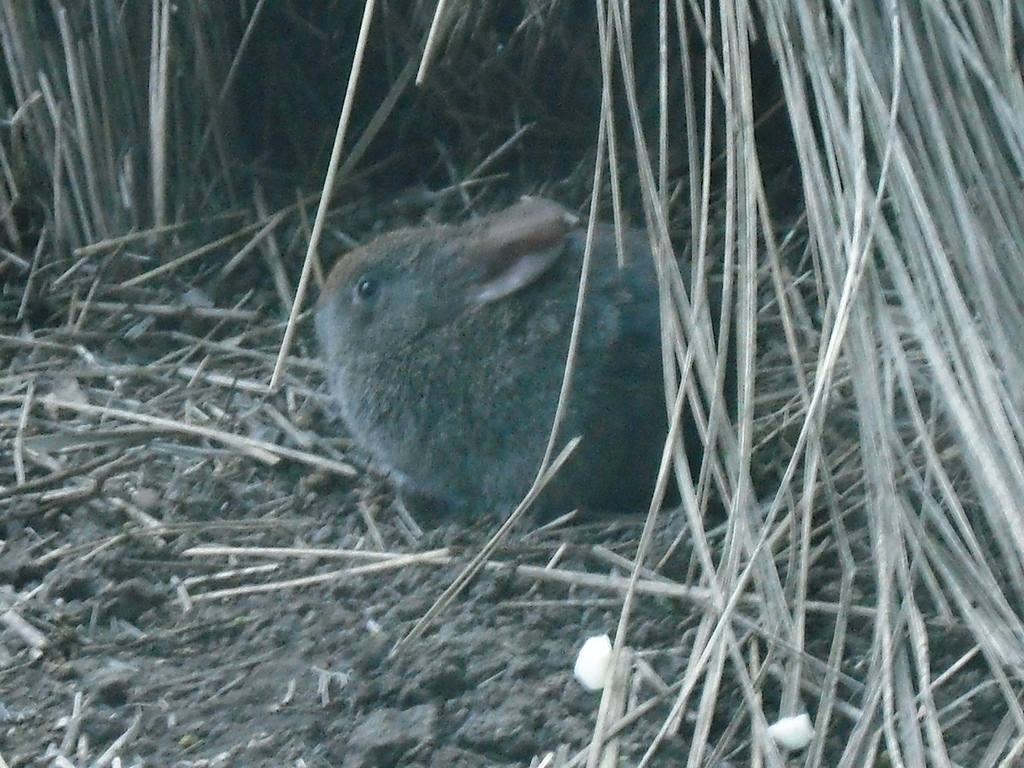
The Volcano rabbit inhabits the region

The Trans-Mexican Volcanic Belt pine–oak forests occupy an area of 92,503 square kilometers (35,716 sq mi), extending from Jalisco state in the west to Veracruz in the east.

The main mass of the volcanic belt extends east to west through the states of Jalisco, Michoacán, México, Morelos, Tlaxcala, Puebla, and Veracruz. The ecoregion includes the smaller mountain ranges which rise from the Mexican Plateau, including the Sierra de Santa Rosa, Sierra de Lobos, and Sierra de Pénjamo in Guanajuato, and northwards to El Gogorrón National Park in San Luis Potosí.

The pine–oak forests are surrounded by tropical dry forests at lower elevations to the west, northwest, and south; the Jalisco dry forests to the west and southwest; the Balsas dry forests to the south in the basin of the Balsas River, and the Bajío dry forests to the northwest in the basin of the Río Grande de Santiago and the lower Rio Lerma. The Central Mexican matorral lies to the north of the range in the high basins of the Plateau, including the Valley of Mexico and the upper reaches of the Lerma around Toluca. The Tehuacán Valley matorral lies in the rain shadow valley to the southeast in Puebla and Tlaxcala states. To the east, the moist Veracruz montane forests and Oaxacan montane forests are the transition between the pine–oak forests and the lowland tropical forests along the Gulf of Mexico.

Pockets of montane grassland and shrubland, known as Zacatonal, grow at high elevations among the pine–oak forests.

== Flora ==
The chief plant communities are pine forests, pine–oak forests, oak forests, pine–cedar forests, pine–fir forests, and zacatonal. The plant communities vary with elevation and rainfall.

Pine forests are generally found between 2,275 and 2,600 m. Pine–oak forests occur between 2,470 and 2,600 m. Pine–cedar forests can be found above 2,700 m. Pine–fir forests occur above 3000 m.

In the pine forests, Montezuma pine (Pinus montezumae) is generally predominant, with smooth-bark Mexican pine (P. pseudostrobus) predominant in more humid areas, and Hartweg's pine (P. hartwegii) and P. tecote in dry areas with shallow soils. Pinus veitchii is endemic to the central portion of the ecoregion, which grows in pine–oak and mixed conifer forests from approximately 2500 to 3200 meters elevation, where it is often emergent.

Pine–fir forests are composed almost entirely of Hartweg's pine (Pinus hartwegii) and sacred fir (Abies religiosa).

The western portion of the ecoregion, in western Jalisco and Colima states, is home to several endemic species. Quercus iltisii is found in the mountains of Jalisco and Colima. Quercus cualensis is known only from the Sierra el Cuale in western Jalisco between 1,800 and 2,300 meters elevation, and is endangered. Quercus tuitensis is found only in the lower montane forests of Jalisco's Sierra el Tuito. Magnolia iltisiana is found in the Manantlán and Cacoma sierras of Jalisco and near Morelia in Michoacán. Acer binzayedii is known only from the Sierra de Manantlán. Pinus jaliscana is also endemic to western Jalisco, where it is found mostly in the Sierra el Cuale and Sierra el Tuito.

== Fauna ==
The Transvolcanic jay, (Aphelocoma ultramarina), Sierra Madre sparrow (Xenospiza baileyi) and the green-striped brushfinch (Atlapetes virenticeps) are near-endemic species, limited to the pine–oak forests of the Transvolcanic Range and the southern Sierra Madre Occidental. Other native birds include the great horned owl (Bubo virginianus), long-tailed wood partridge (Dendrortyx macroura), white-tipped dove (Leptotila verreauxi), Montezuma quail (Cyrtonyx montezumae), banded quail (Philortx fasciatus), northern bobwhite (Colinus virginianus), and grey-barred wren (Campylorhynchus megalopterus).

The volcano rabbit (Romerolagus diazi) and the Mexican volcano mouse (Neotomodon alstoni) are endemic to the ecoregion.

=== Monarch butterflies ===
The Volcanic Belt pine–oak forests of eastern Michoacán and western México states is the winter habitat of monarch butterflies (Danaus plexippus), which migrate from temperate regions of North America east of the Rocky Mountains. The Mariposa Monarca Biosphere Reserve is within this ecoregion.

== Protected areas ==
17.85% of the ecoregion is in protected areas. Protected areas include:

- Barranca del Cupatitzio National Park
- Bosencheve National Park
- Cañón del Río Blanco National Park
- Cerro de Garnica National Park
- Chichinautzin Biological Corridor
- Ciénegas del Lerma Flora and Fauna Protection Area
- Cofre de Perote National Park (Nauhcampatépetl)
- Cumbres del Ajusco National Park
- Desierto del Carmen National Park (Nixcongo)
- Desierto de los Leones National Park
- Fuentes Brotantes de Tlalpan National Park
- El Gogorrón National Park
- Insurgente Miguel Hidalgo y Costilla National Park
- Insurgente José María Morelos National Park
- Iztaccíhuatl–Popocatépetl National Park
- El Jabalí Flora and Fauna Protection Area
- Lagunas de Zempoala National Park
- Lomas de Padierna National Park
- Los Remedios National Park
- La Malinche National Park (Matlalcuéyatl)
- Monarch Butterfly Biosphere Reserve
- Nevado de Toluca Flora and Fauna Protection Area
- Pico de Orizaba National Park
- Pico de Tancítaro Flora and Fauna Protection Area
- La Primavera Biosphere Reserve
- Rayón National Park
- Sacromonte National Park
- Sierra de los Agustinos Sustainable Use Area
- Sierra de Huautla Biosphere Reserve
- Sierra de Lobos Sustainable Use Area
- Sierra de Manantlán Biosphere Reserve
- Sierra de Quila Flora and Fauna Protection Area
- Sierra de Vallejo Biosphere Reserve
- El Tepozteco National Park
- Volcán Nevado de Colima National Park
- Xicoténcatl National Park
- Zona Protectora Forestal los terrenos constitutivos de las cuencas de los ríos Valle de Bravo, Malacatepec, Tilostoc y Temascaltepec

== See also ==
- Pine-oak Forests of Puebla, Mexico
- Conifers of Mexico
- List of ecoregions in Mexico
