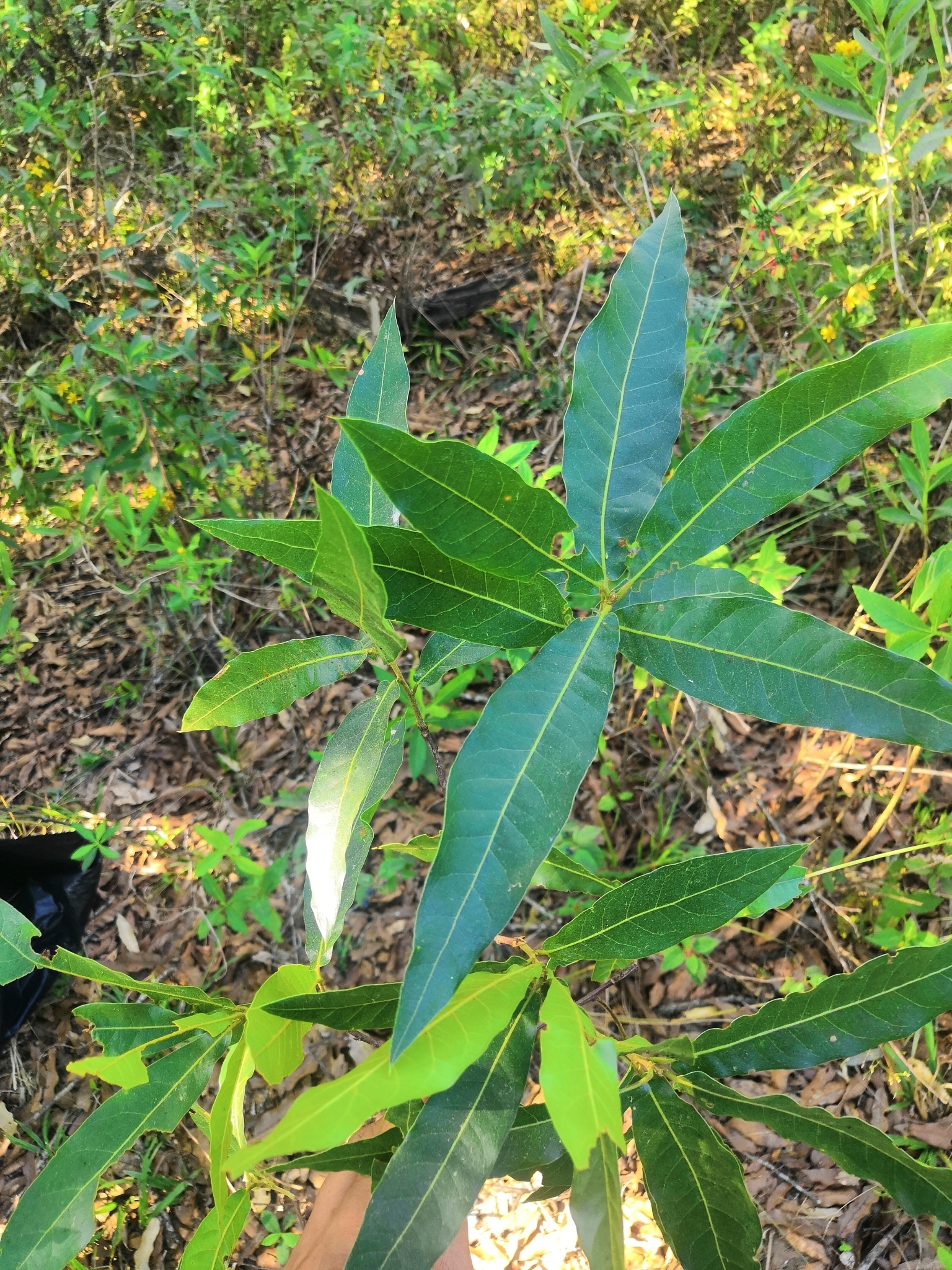

Conservation status
- Near Threatened (IUCN 3.1)

Scientific classification
- Kingdom: Plantae
- Clade: Embryophytes
- Clade: Tracheophytes
- Clade: Spermatophytes
- Clade: Angiosperms
- Clade: Eudicots
- Clade: Rosids
- Order: Fagales
- Family: Fagaceae
- Genus: Quercus
- Subgenus: Quercus subg. Quercus
- Section: Quercus sect. Lobatae
- Species: Q. iltisii

Binomial name
- Quercus iltisii L.M.González 2003

= Quercus iltisii =

Species of oak tree

Quercus iltisii is a species of oak tree native to western Mexico, where it is found in a small portion of Jalisco and Colima states.

== Description ==
Quercus iltisii is an evergreen tree up to 25 metres (82 feet) tall, with a trunk sometimes as much as 100 centimetres (39 inches) in diameter. The leaves are thin, flat, narrowly lance-shaped, hairless on the upper surface but hairy on the underside, up to 18 cm (7 in) long.

== Range and habitat ==
Quercus iltisii is native to the Pacific slope of the coastal mountains of western Jalisco and northern Colima states, which are considered either the westernmost portion of the Trans-Mexican Volcanic Belt or the northwesternmost Sierra Madre del Sur. The species has an estimated area of occupancy (AOO) of 76 to 475 km^{2} and an estimated extent of occurrence (EOO) of 9,094 km^{2}.

The species is found in a range of forest types between 330 and 1,500 meters elevation, including tropical semi-deciduous dry forests at lower elevations, and lower montane pine–oak forests and humid cloud forests (also known as montane mesophytic forests) at higher elevations. It is fairly common across its limited range. Associated tree species include Quercus aristata, Quercus castanea, Quercus elliptica, Quercus glaucescens, Pinus oocarpa, Pinus maximinoi, Pinus jaliscana, Pinus gordoniana, Clethra rosei, Magnolia iltisiana, and Carpinus tropicalis. It is a common canopy tree the cloud forests above El Durazno from 950 to 1,200 meters elevation in the southern Sierra de Manantlán.

== Conservation ==
Quercus iltisii is threatened with habitat loss from deforestation. Much of its lower montane pine–oak and cloud forest habitats have been deforested for livestock pasture, agriculture including coffee and maize, timber harvesting including illegal logging, mining, road building, and urbanization. Its conservation status is assessed as near-threatened. A portion of its range is protected in Sierra de Manantlán Biosphere Reserve.
