= World Network of Biosphere Reserves in Latin America and the Caribbean =

Under UNESCO’s Man and the Biosphere Programme, there are 125 biosphere reserves recognized as part of the World Network of Biosphere Reserves in Latin America and the Caribbean (as of April, 2016). These are distributed across 21 countries in the region.

== The list ==
Below is the list of biosphere reserves in Latin America and the Caribbean, organized by country/territory, along with the year these were designated as part of the World Network of Biosphere Reserves.

=== Argentina ===
- San Guillermo (1980)
- Laguna Blanca (1982)
- Costero del Sur (1984)
- Ñacuñán (1986)
- Pozuelos (1990)
- Yabotí (1995)
- Mar Chiquita (1996)
- Delta del Paraná (2000)
- Riacho Teuquito (2000)
- Laguna Oca del Río Paraguay (2001)
- Las Yungas (2002)
- Andino Norpatagonica (2007)
  - Lanín National Park
  - Nahuel Huapi National Park
  - Los Arrayanes National Park
  - Lago Puelo National Park
  - Los Alerces National Park
- Pereyra Iraola (2007)
- Valdés (2014)
- Patagonia Azul (2015)

=== Bolivia ===
- Pilon-Lajas (1977)
- Ulla Ulla (1977)
- Beni (1986)

=== Brazil ===
- Mata Atlântica (including São Paulo Green Belt) (1993)
- Cerrado (1993)
- Pantanal (2000)
- Caatinga (2001)
- Central Amazon (2001)
- Espinhaço Range (2005)

=== Chile ===
- Fray Jorge (1977)
- Juan Férnandez (1977)
- Torres del Paine (1978)
- Laguna San Rafael (1979)
- Lauca (1981)
- Araucarias (1983)
- La Campana-Peñuelas (1984)
- Cabo de Hornos (2005)
- Bosques Templados Lluviosos de los Andes Australes (2007)
- Corredor Biológico Nevados de Chillán - Laguna del Laja (2011)

=== Colombia ===
- Cinturón Andino (1979)
  - Cueva de los Guácharos
  - Puracé
  - Nevado del Huila
- El Tuparro (1979)
- Sierra Nevada de Santa Marta (1979)
- Ciénaga Grande de Santa Marta (2000)
- Seaflower (2000)

=== Costa Rica ===
- La Amistad International Park (1982)
- Cordillera Volcánica Central (1988, extended in 2010)
- Aqua y Paz (2007)
- Savegre Reserve (2017)

=== Cuba ===
- Sierra del Rosario (1984)
- Cuchillas del Toa (1987)
- Península de Guanahacabibes (1987)
- Baconao (1987)
- Ciénaga de Zapata (2000)
- Buenavista (2000)

=== Dominican Republic ===
- Jaragua-Bahoruco-Enriquillo (2002) (merged with adjacent Haiti's La Selle in 2017)

=== Ecuador ===
- Archipiélago de Colón (Galápagos) (1984)
- Yasuni (1989)
- Sumaco (2000)
- Podocarpus-El Condor (2007)
- Macizo del Cajas (2013)
- Bosque Seco (2014)
- Bosques de Paz (2017, shared with Peru)
- Choco Andino de Pichincha (2018)

=== El Salvador ===
- Apaneca-Llamatepec (2007)
  - Coatepeque Caldera
  - Izalco
- Xiriualtique Jiquilisco (2007)
- Trifinio Fraternidad Transboundary Biosphere Reserve (El Salvador/Guatemala/Honduras) (2011)

=== Guadeloupe ===
- Guadeloupe National Park

=== Guatemala ===
- Maya (1990)
- Sierra de las Minas (1992)
- Trifinio Fraternidad Transboundary Biosphere Reserve (El Salvador/Guatemala/Honduras) (2011)

=== Haiti ===
- La Selle (2012) (merged with adjacent Jaragua-Bahoruco-Enriquillo, Dominican Republic, in 2017.)
- La Hotte (2016)

=== Honduras ===
- Río Plátano (1980)
- Trifinio Fraternidad Transboundary Biosphere Reserve (El Salvador/Guatemala/Honduras) 2011 (extended in 2016)
- Cacique Lempira, Señor de las Montañas (2015)
- San Marcos de Colón (2017)

=== Mexico ===
- Mapimí (1977)
- La Michilía (1977)
- Montes Azules (1979)
- El Cielo (1986)
- Sian Ka'an (1986)
- Sierra de Manantlán Biosphere Reserve (1988)
- Calakmul (1993)
- El Triunfo (1993)
- El Vizcaíno (2021)
- Alto Golfo de California (1993)
- Alto Golfo de California (1995)
- Sierra Gorda (2001)
- Banco Chinchorro (2003)
- Sierra La Laguna (2003)
- Ría Celestún (2004)
- Ría Lagartos (2004)
- Cumbres de Monterrey (2006)
- Huatulco (2006)
- La Encrucijada (2006)
- La Primavera (2006)
- La Sepultura (2006)
- Laguna Madre and Río Bravo Delta (2006)
- Los Tuxtlas (2006)
- Maderas del Carmen (2006)
- Mariposa Monarca (2006)
- Pantanos de Centla (2006)
- Selva El Ocote (2006)
- Sierra de Huautla (2006)
- Volcán Tacaná (2006)
- Arrecife Alacranes (2006)
- Barranca de Metztitlán (2006)
- Chamela-Cuixmala (2006)
- Cuatrocienagas (2006)
- Sistema Arrecifal Veracruzano (2006)
- Sierra de Álamos–Río Cuchujaqui (2007)
- Islas Marietas (2008)
- Lagunas de Montebello (2009)
- Naha-Metzabok (2010)
- Los Volcanes (2010)
- Islas Marías (2010)
- Tehuacán-Cuicatlán (2012)
- Isla Cozumel (2016)

=== Nicaragua ===
- Bosawas (1997)
- Río San Juan (2003)
- Ometepe Island (2010)

=== Panama ===
- Darién National Park (1983)
- La Amistad International Park (2000)

=== Paraguay ===
- Bosque Mbaracayú (2000)
- El Chaco (2005)
- Itaipu (2017), part of Alto Paraná Atlantic forests
- Sur del Alto Paraná (2026)

=== Peru ===
- Huascarán (1977)
- Manu (1977)
- Noroeste Amotapes–Manglares (1977, expanded and renamed 2016)
  - Cerros de Amotape National Park
  - El Angolo Game Preserve
  - Tumbes National Reserve
  - Tumbes Mangals National Sanctuary
- Oxapampa-Ashaninka-Yanesha (2010)
  - Yanachaga–Chemillén National Park
  - San Matías–San Carlos Protection Forest
  - Yanesha Communal Reservation
  - El Sira Communal Reserve
- Gran Pajatén (2016)
  - Rio Abiseo National Park
- Bosques de Paz (2017, shared with Ecuador)

=== Saint Kitts and Nevis ===
- St Mary's (2011)

=== Uruguay ===
- Bañados del Este (1976)
- Bioma Pampa-Quebradas del Norte (2014)

=== Venezuela ===
- Alto Orinoco-Casiquiare (1993)
- Delta del Orinoco (2009)
