= Biosphere reserves of Mexico =

The biosphere reserves of Mexico are protected natural areas. Some are designated by the national government, while others are internationally designated by UNESCO.

== National biosphere reserves ==
As of September 2021, the following areas have been designated biosphere reserves by the Mexican Government.

- Alto Golfo de California Biosphere Reserve, Baja California
- Sian Ka'an Reefs, Quintana Roo
- Bahía de los Ángeles Biosphere Reserve, Baja California
- Baja California Pacific Islands Biosphere Reserve
- Barranca de Metztitlán Biosphere Reserve, Hidalgo
- Banco Chinchorro Biosphere Reserve, Quintana Roo
- Calakmul Biosphere Reserve, Campeche
- Chamela-Cuixmala Biosphere Reserve, Jalisco
- Deep Mexican Caribbean Biosphere Reserve
- Deep Mexican Pacific Biosphere Reserve
- El Pinacate y Gran Desierto de Altar Biosphere Reserve, Sonora
- El Triunfo Biosphere Reserve, Chiapas
- El Vizcaíno Biosphere Reserve, Baja California Sur
- Guadalupe Island Biosphere Reserve, Baja California
- Islas Marías Biosphere Reserve, Nayarit
- Janos Biosphere Reserve, Chihuahua
- La Encrucijada Biosphere Reserve, Chiapas
- La Michilía Biosphere Reserve, Durango
- La Sepultura Biosphere Reserve, Chiapas
- Lacan-Tun Biosphere Reserve, Chiapas
- Los Petenes Biosphere Reserve
- Los Tuxtlas Biosphere Reserve, Veracruz
- Mapimí Biosphere Reserve, Durango
- Marismas Nacionales Biosphere Reserve, Nayarit and Sinaloa
- Monarch Butterfly Biosphere Reserve, Michoacán and State of Mexico
- Montes Azules Biosphere Reserve, Chiapas
- Ojo de Liebre Lagoon Biosphere Reserve, Baja California Sur
- Pantanos de Centla Biosphere Reserve, Campeche and Tabasco
- Ría Celestun Biosphere Reserve, Yucatán
- Ría Lagartos Biosphere Reserve, Yucatán
- San Pedro Mártir Island Biosphere Reserve, Sonora
- Selva El Ocote Biosphere Reserve, Chiapas
- Sian Ka'an Biosphere Reserve, Quintana Roo
- Sierra del Abra Tanchipa Biosphere Reserve, San Luis Potosí
- Sierra Gorda Biosphere Reserve, Querétaro and San Luis Potosí
- Sierra Gorda de Guanajuato Biosphere Reserve, Guanajuato
- Sierra de Huautla Biosphere Reserve, Morelos and Guerrero
- Sierra La Laguna Biosphere Reserve, Baja California
- Sierra de Manantlán Biosphere Reserve, Jalisco and Colima
- Sierra de San Juan Biosphere Reserve, Nayarit
- Sierra de Tamaulipas Biosphere Reserve, Tamaulipas
- Sierra de Vallejo Biosphere Reserve, Jalisco
- Tehuacán-Cuicatlán Biosphere Reserve, Oaxaca and Puebla
- Whale Shark Biosphere Reserve (Tiburón Ballena), Quintana Roo
- Volcán Tacaná Biosphere Reserve, Chiapas
- Zicuirán-Infiernillo Biosphere Reserve, Michoacán

== UNESCO biosphere reserves in Mexico ==
UNESCO has designated certain natural protected areas in Mexico as international biosphere reserves through its Man and the Biosphere Programme. Some are also designated biosphere reserves by the Mexican government, while others have a different national designation (national park, flora and fauna protection area, etc.).
