= Zacatonal =

Montane grasslands and shrublands ecoregion of central Mexico

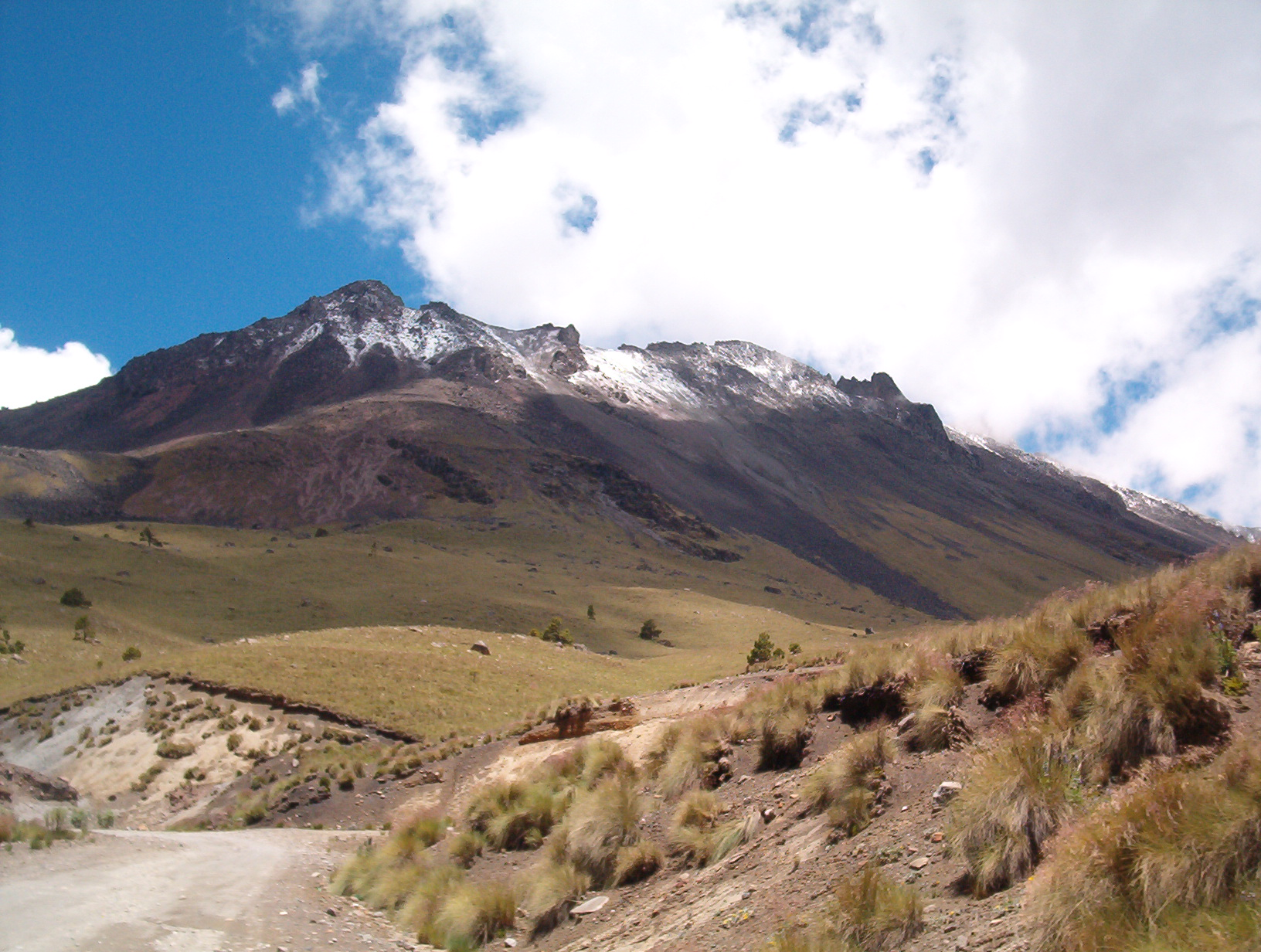
- Zacatonal on Nevado de Toluca

Ecology
- Realm: Neotropical
- Biome: montane grasslands and shrublands
- Borders: Trans-Mexican Volcanic Belt pine-oak forests
- Bird species: 204
- Mammal species: 48

Geography
- Area: 306 km^{2} (118 mi^{2})
- Country: Mexico

Conservation
- Conservation status: Relatively stable/intact

The Zacatonal is a montane grassland and shrubland ecoregion of central Mexico.

== Geography ==
The Zacatonal consists of several enclaves of grassland and shrubland occupying the highest peaks of the Trans-Mexican Volcanic Belt, covering about 306 square kilometers (118 sq mi).

Zacatonal is found above 3500 meters elevation on the volcanoes Popocatépetl, Iztaccihuatl, Malinche, Nevado de Toluca, Cofre de Perote, Pico de Tancítaro, and Pico de Orizaba. Zacatonal is surrounded by the Trans-Mexican Volcanic Belt pine-oak forests ecoregion at lower elevations.

== Climate ==
The climate is temperate and subhumid at lower elevations, becoming alpine and subhumid at the highest elevations.

== Flora ==
The predominant plant community is grassland, ranging from subalpine to alpine.

Open forest of Hartweg's pine (Pinus hartwegii) and/or Montezuma pine (Pinus montezumae) marks the transition between the lower-elevation pine-oak forests and the subalpine grasslands at about 3500 meters elevation. Grassland dominated by Toluca fescue (Festuca tolucensis) and Toluca reedgrass (Calamagrostis tolucensis) grows as an understory among the pines, in open Juniperus monticola woodland, or as open grassland. Other grasses and forbs include Arenaria bryoides, Descurainia impatiens, Draba jorullensis, Lupinus montanus, Muhlenbergia pusilla, M. quadridentata, Oxalis sp., Pedicularis orizabae, Penstemon gentianoides, Poa annua, Potentilla staminea, Sicyos parviflorus, and Trisetum spicatum. At 3800 meters elevation Muhlenbergia quadridentata becomes the dominant grass, with Calamagrostis tolucensis dominant between 3800 and 4200 meters.

The transition from subalpine to alpine grasslands occurs between 4200 and 4300 meters elevation. Alpine grasslands are dominated by the grasses Festuca tolucensis and Arenaria bryoides. Other alpine zone plants include species of Carex, Cerastium, Cirsium, Draba, Eryngium, Gnaphalium, Lupinus, Luzula, Oxylobus, Phacelia, Plantago, Potentilla, Ranunculus, and Senecio, together with ferns, mosses, and lichens.

The flora of the Zacatonal is distinct from both temperate North America's alpine grasslands and the alpine páramo of Central and South America, and includes many endemic species.

== Fauna ==
The Sierra Madre sparrow (Xenospiza baileyi) is found in the transition zone between the Zacatonal and pine forests. Native mammals include the Mexican volcano mouse (Neotomodon alstoni), volcano harvest mouse (Reithrodontomys chrysopsis), and volcano rabbit (Romerolagus diazi), and Cryptotis goldmani alticola, a subspecies of Goldman's broad-clawed shrew.

== Conservation and threats ==
Many of the grasslands are in a degraded state from overgrazing by livestock or unregulated burning. In 1935 the Mexican government placed nearly 4,000 km^{2} of the mountains surrounding the Valley of Mexico under protection, including both Zacatonal and lower-elevation pine-oak forests.

== See also ==
- List of ecoregions in Mexico
