= Ocote =

Ocote is a common name for various species of pine trees in the genus Pinus that occur in the Spanish-speaking Americas—Latin America.

They include:

- Pinus apulcensis
- Pinus ayacahuite
- Pinus cooperi
- Pinus devoniana
- Pinus durangensis
- Pinus gordoniana
- Pinus greggii
- Pinus hartwegii
- Pinus herrerae
- Pinus jaliscana
- Pinus leiophylla
- Pinus lumholtzii
- Pinus maximinoi
- Pinus montezumae
- Pinus oocarpa
- Pinus patula
- Pinus pringlei
- Pinus pseudostrobus
- Pinus rzedowskii
- Pinus tecunumanii
- Pinus teocote

== See also ==
- Pinus taxa by common names
- Plant common names
