= El Gogorrón National Park =

National park in Mexico

Gogorrón National Park
- IUCN category II (national park)
- Location within Mexico
- Location: San Luis Potosí, Mexico
- Nearest city: San Luis Potosí
- Coordinates: 21.98°N 101.02°W
- Area: 380.1 km^{2} (146.8 sq mi)
- Designation: National park
- Designated: 1936
- Administrator: National Commission of Natural Protected Areas

Gogorrón National Park is protected natural area in the state San Luis Potosí, Mexico.

The size of the protected area is 250 km^{2}. The park is surrounded by the elevations in the Sierras de Bernalejo and La Cuesta and the nearby Altamira River. The name of the area is coming from Hacienda El Gogorrón, who made this place a resort. On 22 September 1936 the area becomes a protected area and national park.

== Flora and fauna ==
=== Flora ===
Representatives of species: Pinion (Pinus cembroides), Pine (Pinus montezumae), Encino (Quercus intricata), Oak (Quercus polymorpha), Encino (Quercus rugosa), Encino (Quercus diversifolia), (Quercus potosina), Nopal (Opuntia spp.).

=== Fauna ===
Representatives of species: Black-tailed Rattlesnake (Crotalus molossus), Wild Duck (Anas platyrhynchos), Tecolote pocero (Athene cunicularia), White-tailed deer (Odocoileus virginianus).

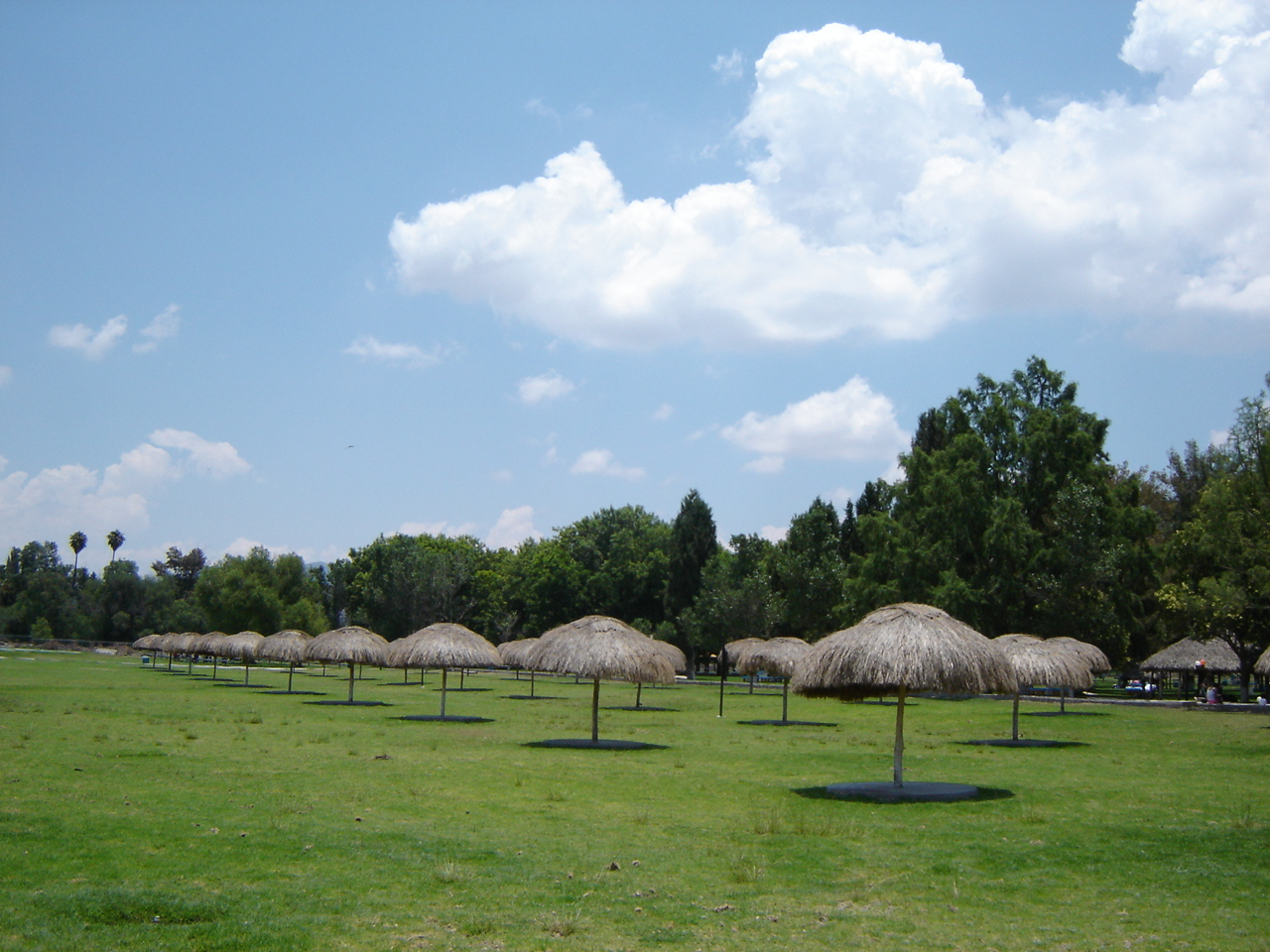

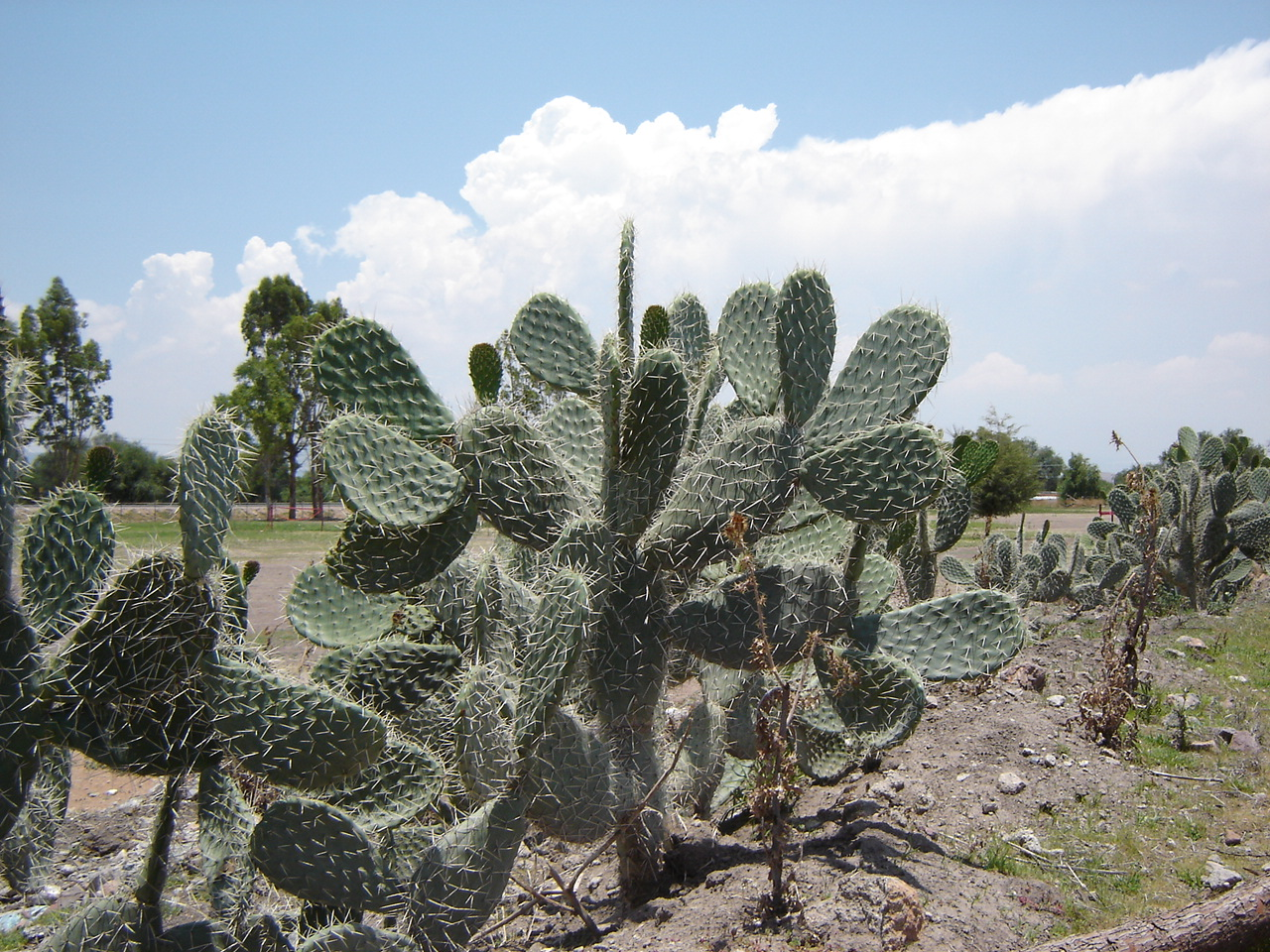
Cactuses in the park

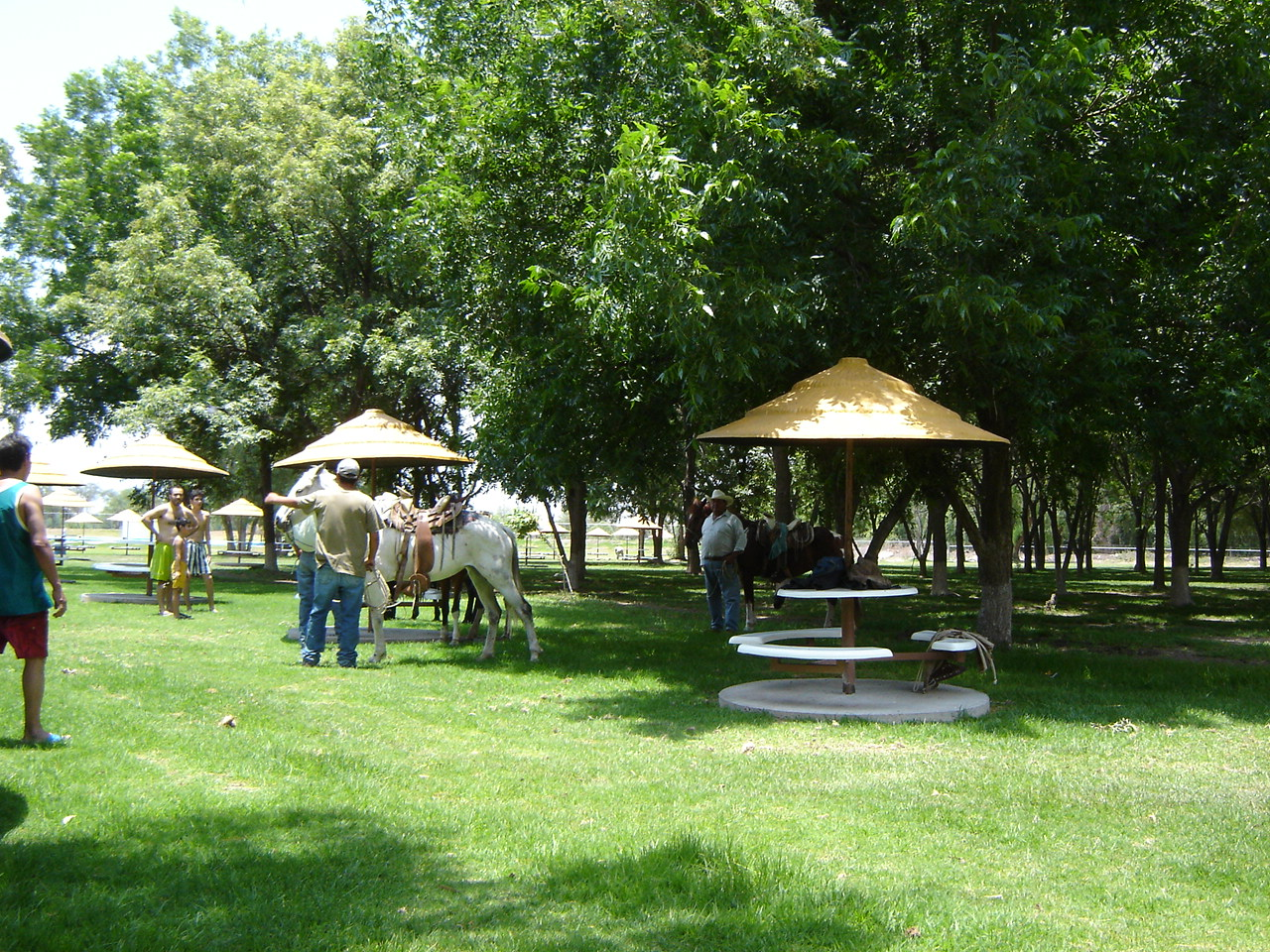
Horse Riding in Gogorrón National Park
