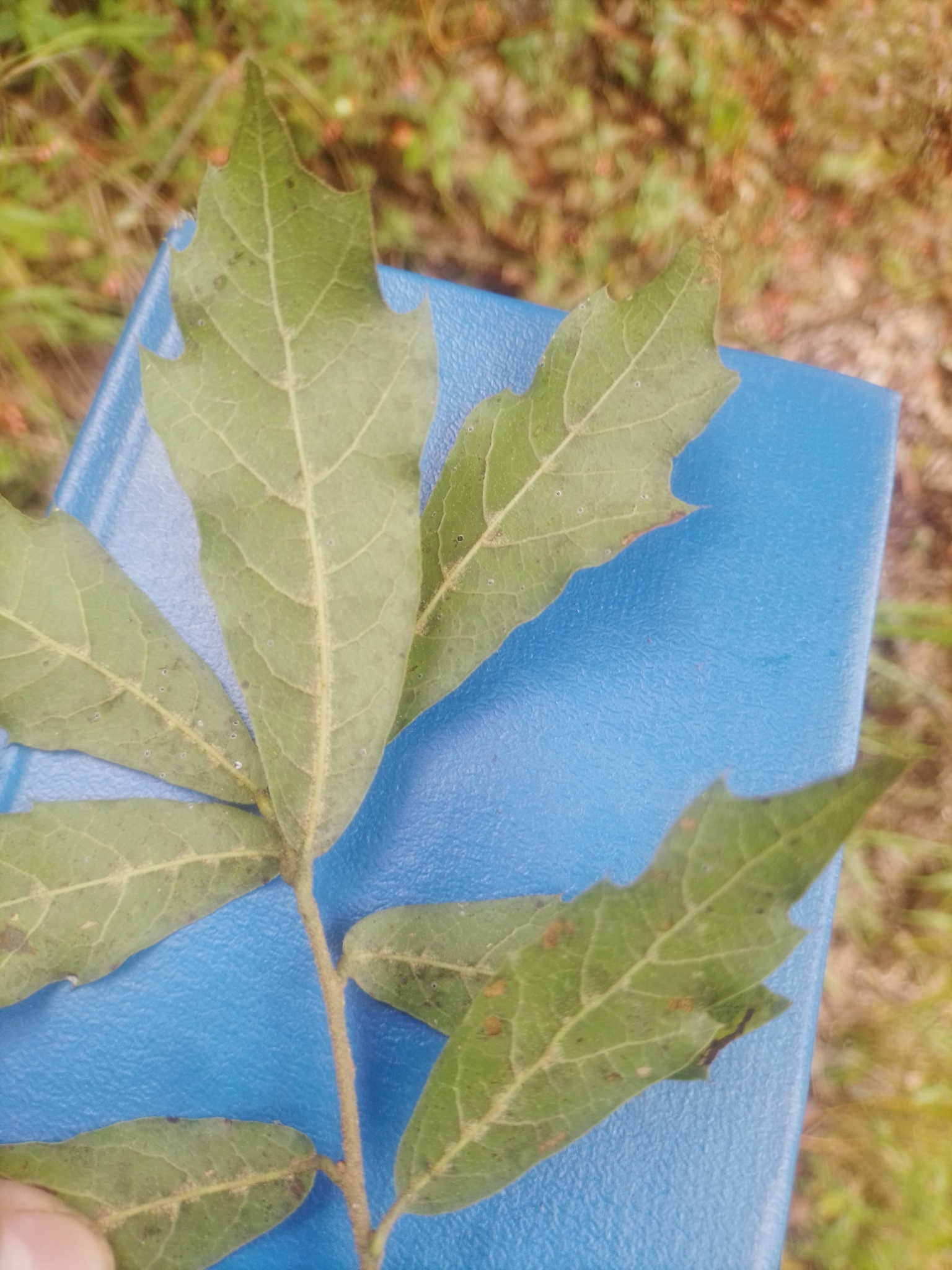

Conservation status
- Least Concern (IUCN 3.1)

Scientific classification
- Kingdom: Plantae
- Clade: Tracheophytes
- Clade: Angiosperms
- Clade: Eudicots
- Clade: Rosids
- Order: Fagales
- Family: Fagaceae
- Genus: Quercus
- Subgenus: Quercus subg. Quercus
- Section: Quercus sect. Quercus
- Species: Q. martinezii

Binomial name
- Quercus martinezii C.H.Mull.

= Quercus martinezii =

Species of oak tree

Quercus martinezii is a species of oak found in southwestern and central Mexico. It has been found in Nayarit, Jalisco, Michoacán, Guerrero, and Oaxaca states. It is placed in Quercus section Quercus.

== Description ==
It is a tall forest tree up to 25 metres (82 feet) tall with a trunk 50 centimetres (20 inches) or more in diameter. The leaves are thick and stiff, gray-green on the upper surface, lighter on the underside, lance-shaped or egg-shaped with irregular teeth.

== Range and habitat ==
Quercus martinezii is native to montane forests in the mountains of west-central and southern Mexico. It is found in the Sierra de San Juan of western Nayarit, the western Trans-Mexican Volcanic Belt of Jalisco, Michoacán, and Mexico states, and the Sierra Madre del Sur of Michoacán, Guerrero, and Oaxaca states.

The tree is generally found in cloud forests, and occasionally in humid oak forest and pine–oak forests, between 1,800 and 2,600 meters elevation.

== Conservation and threats ==
The population size and trends of Quercus martinezii have not been quantitatively studied. Its observed populations are generally low-density or scarce. It is threatened with habitat loss from deforestation across much of its range. There are populations in several protected areas, including the Sierra de San Juan Biosphere Reserve in Nayarit, the Sierra de Manantlán Biosphere Reserve in Jalisco.
