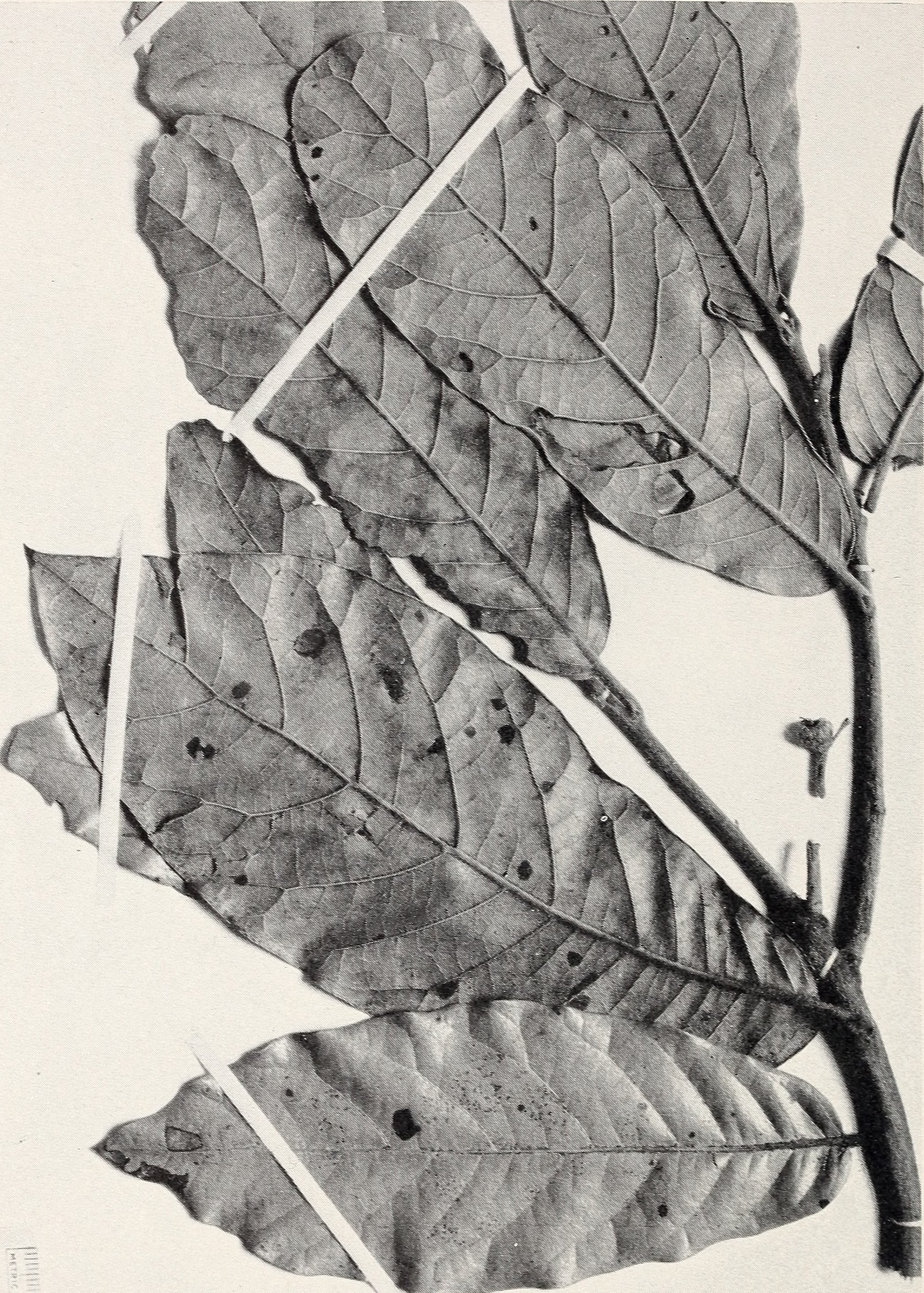

Conservation status
- Least Concern (IUCN 3.1)

Scientific classification
- Kingdom: Plantae
- Clade: Embryophytes
- Clade: Tracheophytes
- Clade: Spermatophytes
- Clade: Angiosperms
- Clade: Eudicots
- Clade: Rosids
- Order: Fagales
- Family: Fagaceae
- Genus: Quercus
- Subgenus: Quercus subg. Quercus
- Section: Quercus sect. Lobatae
- Species: Q. elliptica

Binomial name
- Quercus elliptica Née

Synonyms
- List: Quercus atrescentirhachis Trel.; Quercus botryocarpa Trel.; Quercus chiquihuitillonis Trel.; Quercus coccinata Trel.; Quercus comayaguana Trel.; Quercus exaristata Trel.; Quercus guayabalana Trel.; Quercus hondurensis Trel.; Quercus lanceolata M.Martens & Galeotti ex A.DC.; Quercus langlassei Trel.; Quercus linguifolia Liebm.; Quercus nectandrifolia Liebm.; Quercus oajacana Liebm.; Quercus peradifolia E.F.Warb.; Quercus porriginosa Trel.; Quercus pubinervis M.Martens & Galeotti; Quercus salicifolia var. oajacana (Liebm.) Wenz.; Quercus yoroensis Trel.; Quercus yoroensis var. aguanana Trel.

= Quercus elliptica =

Species of oak tree

Quercus elliptica is a Mesoamerican species of oak tree. It is widespread across central and southern Mexico and Central America from Sinaloa and Hidalgo south as far as Nicaragua. It is classified in Quercus sect. Lobatae.

== Description ==
Quercus elliptica is a tree growing up to 15 metres (49 feet) tall with a trunk as much as 70 centimetres (28 inches) in diameter. The leaves are thick and leathery, up to 12 cm (4 3/4 in) long, elliptical with wavy edges but no teeth or lobes.

== Habitat and range ==
Quercus elliptica is found in oak forests, cloud forests, and pine–fir (Abies) forests from 300 to 2400 meters elevation. It is mostly restricted to granite soils. Quercus elliptica is often dominant and common where it is found.

Quercus elliptica ranges across central and southern Mexico. Its range extends from the central Sierra Madre Occidental of Sinaloa in the northwest through western Nayarit, including Sierra de San Juan, and western Jalisco, including the Sierra de Vallejo and Sierra de Manantlán. It also ranges through the Sierra Madre del Sur and Sierra Madre de Oaxaca of Guerrero and Oaxaca states. There are populations in the Trans-Mexican Volcanic Belt of Michoacán and Mexico states. In Chiapas it is found in the Sierra Madre de Chiapas and Chiapas Highlands, including Lagunas de Montebello National Park.

There are only two citations in Guatemala, in the Sierra de las Minas and in Camotán. It is also found in the Maya Mountains of Belize, and in the highlands of El Salvador, Honduras, and Nicaragua.

== Conservation ==
Because of its wide range and abundant populations it is rated Least Concern. Despite habitat loss in parts of its range its population is considered stable.

Phytophthora cinnamomi, the fungal parasite known as Sudden Oak Death, has been found in Quercus elliptica.
