= Quercus tuitensis =

Conservation status
- Vulnerable (IUCN 3.1)

Scientific classification
- Kingdom: Plantae
- Clade: Embryophytes
- Clade: Tracheophytes
- Clade: Spermatophytes
- Clade: Angiosperms
- Clade: Eudicots
- Clade: Rosids
- Order: Fagales
- Family: Fagaceae
- Genus: Quercus
- Subgenus: Quercus subg. Quercus
- Section: Quercus sect. Lobatae
- Species: Q. tuitensis

Binomial name
- Quercus tuitensis L.M.González

Species of oak tree

Quercus tuitensis is a species of oak. It is endemic to the Sierra el Tuito of Jalisco state in western Mexico.

== Description ==
Quercus tuitensis is a small to medium-sized deciduous tree, growing 8 to 10 meters high, and occasionally to 15 meters high. Its trunk grows to 25-30 cm in diameter, and occasionally up to 60 cm.

== Range and habitat ==
Quercus tuitensis is known only from the Sierra el Tuito mountains in Talpa de Allende municipality, southeast of Puerto Vallarta.

Its habitat is open, and generally drier, oak or oak–pine forests from 980 to 1400 meters elevation, above the lower-elevation tropical dry subdeciduous forests. It is found in seasonally-humid canyons (barrancas), typically on deep well-drained granitic and ferruginous soils.
