= Quercus diversifolia =

Conservation status
- Endangered (IUCN 3.1)

Scientific classification
- Kingdom: Plantae
- Clade: Embryophytes
- Clade: Tracheophytes
- Clade: Spermatophytes
- Clade: Angiosperms
- Clade: Eudicots
- Clade: Rosids
- Order: Fagales
- Family: Fagaceae
- Genus: Quercus
- Subgenus: Quercus subg. Quercus
- Section: Quercus sect. Quercus
- Species: Q. diversifolia

Binomial name
- Quercus diversifolia Née

Synonyms
- Quercus ambigua Bonpl.; Quercus bonplandiana Sweet; Quercus tomentosa var. diversifolia (Née) A.DC.

Species of oak tree

Quercus diversifolia is an uncommon North American species of oak native to central Mexico. It is a small tree native to Mexico State in central Mexico, and possibly to the neighboring states of Puebla and Guanajuato. It grows in humid montane pine, pine–oak, and oyamel forests from 2,500 to 2,800 metres elevation.

Quercus diversifolia is a shrub or small tree 3–4.2 metres (10–14 feet) tall. The leaves are green on the upper surface, yellow-brown on the underside, with wavy edges.
