= Jalisco dry forests =

Tropical dry broadleaf forest ecoregion in Mexico

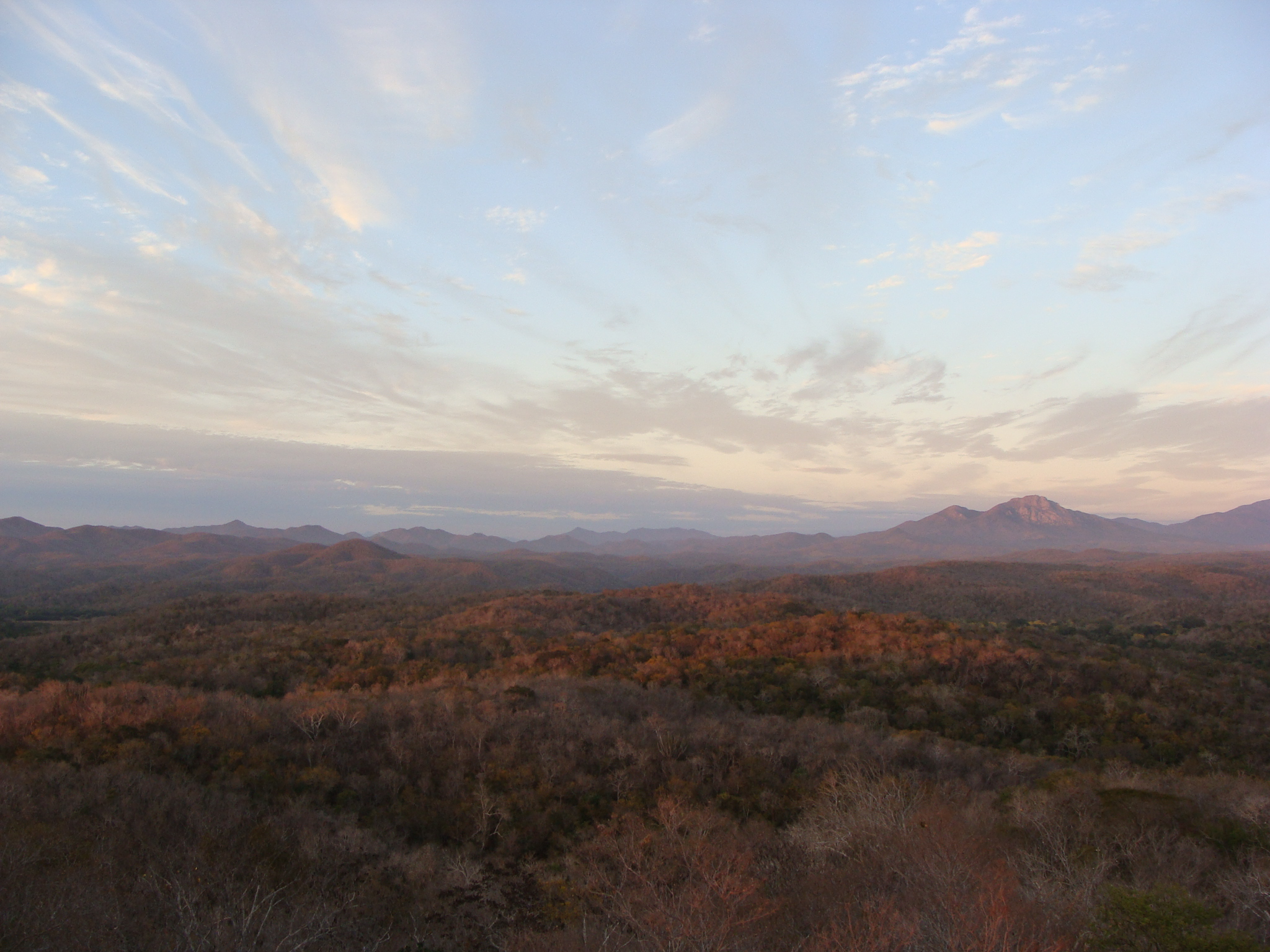
- dry forest in Chamela-Cuixmala Biosphere Reserve

- Ecoregtion territory (in green)

Ecology
- Realm: Neotropical
- Biome: tropical and subtropical dry broadleaf forests
- Borders: List: Bajío dry forests; Balsas dry forests; Sierra Madre del Sur pine-oak forests; Sierra Madre Occidental pine-oak forests; Sinaloan dry forests; Southern Pacific dry forests; Trans-Mexican Volcanic Belt pine-oak forests

Geography
- Area: 25,445 km^{2} (9,824 sq mi)
- Country: Mexico
- States: Colima; Jalisco; Michoacán, Nayarit

Conservation
- Conservation status: Critical/endangered
- Global 200: Mexican dry forests
- Protected: 9%

The Jalisco dry forests is a tropical dry broadleaf forest ecoregion in southwestern Mexico.

== Geography ==
The Jalisco dry forests occupy the coastal lowlands and foothills of Nayarit, Jalisco, Colima, and Michoacán states. The ecoregion mostly lies close to the coast, from San Blas in Nayarit to the mouth of the Balsas River in Michoacán, however the dry forests follow the valleys of the Armería and Tuxpan rivers far inland. The Pacific Ocean lies to the west and south, and the ecoregion includes the Islas Marías off the west coast of Nayarit. The higher-elevation pine-oak forests of the Sierra Madre del Sur and Trans-Mexican volcanic belt lie inland. The Sinaloan dry forests lie to the north, and the Southern Pacific dry forests lie to the southeast across the Balsas River.

Cities in the ecoregion include Puerto Vallarta, Manzanillo, and Colima.

== Climate ==
The climate is tropical and subhumid. Rainfall averages 730–1200 mm per year, falling mostly during the June through October rainy season.

== Flora ==
The principal vegetation in the ecoregion is tropical dry forest. Many trees lose their leaves during the winter dry season. The mature forests have a multi-layered structure, with a middle layer of trees from 15–20 meters high, and an upper layer 20–30 meters high. The layers are characterized by different species, with Astronium graveolens, Bernoullia flammea, Sideroxylon cartilagineum, Bursera arborea, Calophyllum brasiliense, Dendropanax arboreus, Ficus cotinifolia, and Swietenia humilis in the middle layer, and Cordia alliodora, Croton pseudoniveus, Lonchocarpus lanceolatus, Trichilia trifolia, and Caesalpinia eriostachys in the upper layer. Columnar and arborescent cacti are common, including Opuntia excelsa and species of Pachycereus, Stenocereus, and Cephalocereus. Creepers are common in the understory, and there are few epiphytes. Palm forests of Attalea guacuyule occur along the coast.

The forests are among the most diverse in the Neotropics, with about 1200 species of plants, of which 16% are endemic. Magnolia vallartensis is a Critically Endangered endemic tree which inhabits humid streamside gallery forests around Puerto Vallarta.

== Fauna ==
Of the ecoregion's 724 species of vertebrates, 233, or 29%, are endemic.

20% of the mammal species are endemic to the ecoregion, and 27% are endangered. Endemic species include Mexican shrew (Megasorex gigas), trumpet-nosed bat (Musonycteris harrisoni), Michoacan deer mouse (Osgoodomys banderanus), Chamela rat (Hodomys alleni), and Magdalena rat (Xenomys nelsoni).

The ecoregion in home to 300 bird species. There are several near-endemic species, including the Mexican parrotlet (Forpus cyanopygius), rufous-bellied chachalaca (Ortalis wagleri), and San Blas jay (Cyanocorax sanblasianus). 55% of the bird species are year-round residents, and 45% are winter migrants from the Nearctic.

51% of reptile species and 58% of amphibians are endemic.

== Protected areas ==
Currently 9% of the ecoregion is in protected areas. A 2017 assessment found that 1,713 km^{2}, or 7%, of the ecoregion was in protected areas, and approximately 29% of the unprotected area is still forested. Protected areas include Chamela-Cuixmala Biosphere Reserve, Islas Marías Biosphere Reserve, Sierra de San Juan Biosphere Reserve, Sierra de Vallejo Biosphere Reserve, Sierra de Manantlán Biosphere Reserve, Sierra de Quila Flora and Fauna Protection Area, and Cuenca Alimentadora del Distrito Nacional de Riego 043 Estado de Nayarit natural resources protection area.

== See also ==
- List of ecoregions in Mexico
