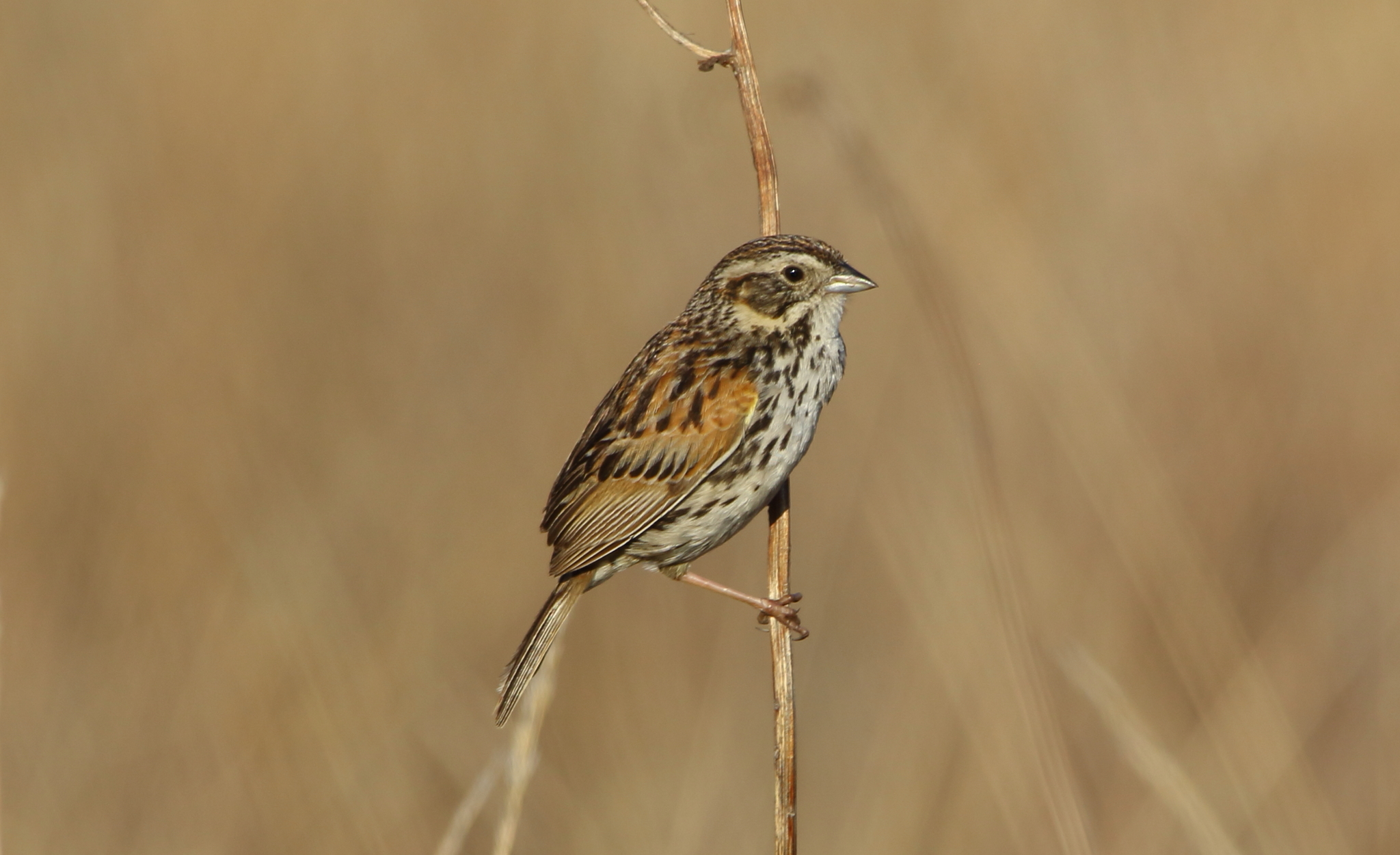

Conservation status
- Endangered (IUCN 3.1)

Scientific classification
- Kingdom: Animalia
- Phylum: Chordata
- Class: Aves
- Order: Passeriformes
- Family: Passerellidae
- Genus: Xenospiza; Bangs, 1931
- Species: X. baileyi

Binomial name
- Xenospiza baileyi Bangs, 1931

Subspecies
- Xenospiza baileyi baileyi; Xenospiza baileyi sierrae Pitelka, 1947

Synonyms
- Ammodramus baileyi

= Sierra Madre sparrow =

Species of bird

The Sierra Madre sparrow (Xenospiza baileyi), also known as Bailey's sparrow, is an endangered, range-restricted, enigmatic American sparrow. It is endemic to Mexico and is threatened with extinction through habitat loss.

== Etymology ==
The genus name Xenospiza is from the Ancient Greek xénos (ξένος), "a stranger", and spíza (σπίζα), "finch". The species name baileyi is a dedication to Alfred M. Bailey, who collected the 1931 specimen for Outram Bangs.

== History and taxonomy ==
The Sierra Madre sparrow was first discovered by scientists in the Sierra de Bolaños near Bolaños, Jalisco, in 1889. The eight specimens shot then were not recognized as what they were, but believed to be aberrant Savannah or Mexican Plateau song sparrows, or hybrids. Only when another bird was taken near the city of Durango in 1931 was it recognized as a valid and distinct species.

The southern population was discovered only in 1945, but has been observed since then in several areas around Distrito Federal, Morelos, and Estado de México. Between 1951, when 5 were taken near El Salto, and 2004, when a small population was rediscovered in the same area, the northern population from Jalisco and Durango states was not found and believed to have disappeared. Meanwhile, the proposed subspecies X. b. sierrae for the southern population was recognized to be based on individual variation and hence invalid; nonetheless, there is no gene flow between the populations and they constitute two separate ESUs.

It is the sole species in the genus Xenospiza; the genus is closely related to Melospiza and is restricted to high altitude alpine grassland habitats.

== Distribution and habitat ==
The species is endemic to some mountain ranges in and near the Sierra Madre Occidental, Mexico. It is restricted to bunchgrass and marshland habitat (zacatonal) in volcanic mountain ranges, at elevations of 2,300–3,050 metres (7,550–10,010 ft); the lower part of the range is occupied by the northern, and the higher part by the southern population.

Habitat information for the northern population is scant, with pine, oak, and Arbutus (probably Arizona Madrone, A. arizonica) trees being mentioned. Better details are available for the more extensively studied southern population. The dominant bunchgrass species are Festuca amplissima, Peruvian feather grass (Stipa ichu), a muhly grass (Muhlenbergia affinis), and Muhlenbergia macroura. Small woods of Montezuma Pine (Pinus montezumae) and (probably) Lumholtz' Pine (P. lumholtzii) occur on elevated terrain.

== Status and conservation ==
It is highly threatened due to clearance of its habitat for creating pastures. Its conservation status on the IUCN Red List is Endangered. This is because the species occurs in less than 5000 km², and its range, available habitat, and population size are shrinking (BirdLife International 2004). Despite the rediscovery of the northern population, no more than a handful of individuals are known to remain, and further research to locate additional subpopulations is urgently needed. In any case, the species will probably be uplisted to Critically Endangered soon; of the 4 subpopulations known, only one (near La Cima) seems reasonably numerous.
