= Sierra del Abra Tanchipa Biosphere Reserve =

- IUCN category Ia (strict nature reserve)
- Location within Mexico
- Location: San Luis Potosí, Mexico
- Nearest city: Ciudad Valles
- Coordinates: 22°13′N 98°57′W
- Area: 167.58 km^{2} (64.70 sq mi)
- Designation: biosphere reserve
- Designated: 1994
- Administrator: National Commission of Natural Protected Areas

Sierra del Abra Tanchipa Biosphere Reserve is a protected natural area in northeastern Mexico. It is located in the Huasteca Potosina region of San Luis Potosí state, in the eastern foothills of the Sierra Madre Oriental.

== Geography ==
The reserve protects an area of 167.58 km^{2} in the Sierra del Abra Tanchipa. The Sierra extends north–south, the easternmost of the Sierra Madre Oriental ranges. The Gulf Coastal Plain lies to the east, between the Sierra and the Gulf of Mexico. Elevations in the reserve range from 300 to 850 meters. The Sierra presents a steep escarpment on the east, facing the coastal plain, and descends gradually to the west.

The Sierra is composed mostly of sedimentary limestone, a porous rock that facilitates rainwater infiltration into groundwater basins and sub-surface drainage.

The Sierra is drained by tributaries of the Río Verde, which is part of the Pánuco River system.

== Climate ==
The climate is tropical, and includes warm humid (Aw1) and warm subhumid (Aw2) Köppen climates. Average annual temperature is 24 °C. Mean annual rainfall in the reserve ranges from 1,200 mm to 1,500 mm, and is greatest in the summer months.

== Flora and fauna ==
The reserve is in the Veracruz moist forests ecoregion, which extends across the Gulf coastal plain and foothills of southern Tamaulipas, eastern San Luis Potosí, and northern Veracruz states. The reserve is in the transition zone between the tropical (Neotropical) and temperate (Nearctic) biogeographic realms of the Americas, and is home to animals and plants characteristic of both realms and some specific to the transition zone.

Plant communities vary with elevation, rainfall, exposure, soil, and disturbance by human activities. Typical plant communities include low deciduous forest, the low semi-deciduous forest, medium semi-deciduous forest, and medium semi-evergreen forest. Deciduous trees typically lose their leaves during the winter dry season to reduce water loss. 420 species of vascular plants have been recorded in the reserve.

279 species of birds have been recorded in the reserve, representing 54 families in 23 orders. 64% are permanent resident species, and the rest are migratory species. 37 species are classified in some at-risk category, and 22% of the recorded species have a medium or high sensitivity to habitat disturbance. 54.12% of bird species have a Neotropical affinity, 26.88% a Nearctic affinity, and 19% are transitional or general to both.

== Conservation ==
The reserve was established in 1994 by the Mexican government. It is managed as a strict nature reserve (IUCN protected area category Ia).
