= Volcán Tacaná Biosphere Reserve =

UNESCO Biosphere Reserve in Chiapas, Mexico

- IUCN category VI (protected area with sustainable use of natural resources)
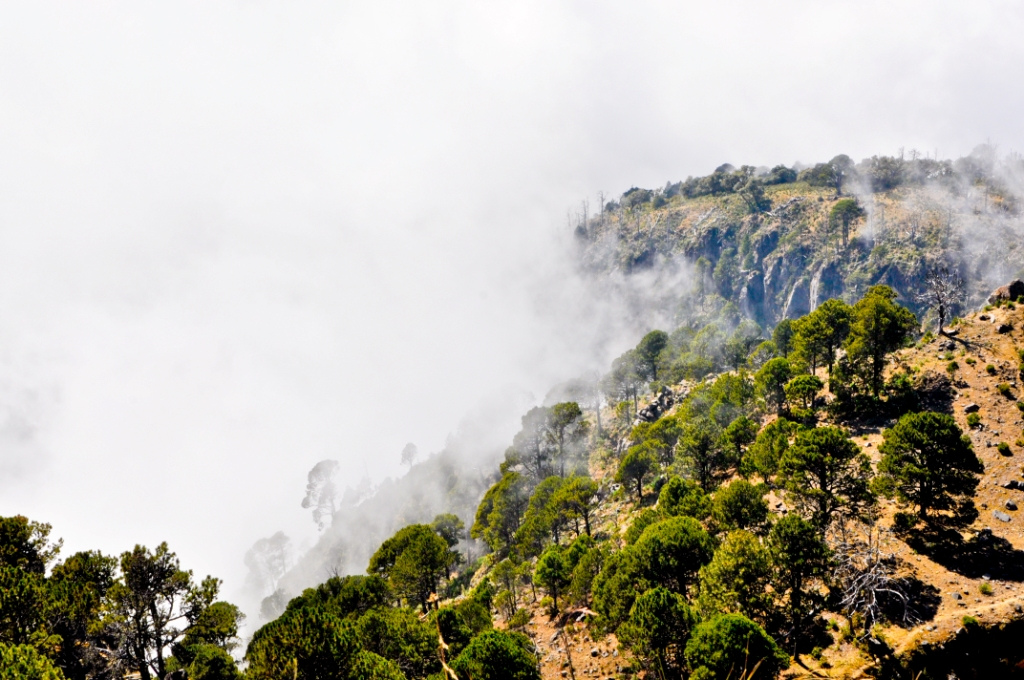
- On the slopes of Volcán Tacaná

- Location within Mexico
- Location: Chiapas, Mexico
- Coordinates: 15°4′12″N 92°4′48″W
- Area: 6,378 hectares (24.63 sq mi)
- Designation: Biosphere reserve
- Designated: 2003 (national) 2006 (international)
- Governing body: National Commission of Natural Protected Areas

The Volcán Tacaná Biosphere Reserve (Spanish: Reserva de Biosfera Volcán Tacaná) (established 2006) is a UNESCO Biosphere Reserve at the Tacaná Volcano in Chiapas, Mexico, on the border with Guatemala. The volcano is part of the Central America Volcanic Arc (Nucleo Centroamericano). The 6,378 hectares (24.63 sq mi) reserve contains fragile ecosystems very rich in wild flora and fauna species of cultural, scientific, economic and biological relevance. Its rich biodiversity and high endemism are found particularly in the high mountain ecosystem and landscapes and in the volcanic edifice which presents geophysical features of great scientific and aesthetic value. Average annual rainfall can amount to 2,000–5,000 millimetres (79–197 in), as in the case of Soconusco.

Human activities in the reserve include coffee-growing, flower-growing, bee-keeping, agriculture and tourism.

== Ecological characteristics ==
The reserve is a rich reservoir of endemic and other species of Central and South American origin which, in Mexico, are only to be found in this area. The topography is rugged with ecosystems of evergreen medium altitude forests, cloud forests and pine, oak and fir forests. It is the only place in the country where two ecosystems are represented: the Tropical Páramo and the Chusqueal ecosystems.

The Volcán Tacana Biosphere Reserve harbors a rich variety of endemic species of flora (Chusquea martinezi) and fauna (Cyllopsis spp. Limanopoda cinna, Dalla sp. Lepidoptera-Rhopalocera). Included among the biota of the volcano are a significant number of charismatic or protected species, such as the Canaco tree (Chiranthodendron derbianus) and the Ornate hawk-eagle (Spizaetus ornatos). There are innumerable species of orchids and bromeliads.

== Flora and fauna ==
According to the National Biodiversity Information System of Comisión Nacional para el Conocimiento y Uso de la Biodiversidad (CONABIO) in Volcán Tacaná Biosphere Reserve there are over 2,455 plant and animal species from which 185 are in at risk category and 48 are exotics.

== Sources ==
This article incorporates text from a free content work (license statement/permission). Text taken from UNESCO - MAB Biosphere Reserves Directory, UNESCO, UNESCO.
