= Chamela-Cuixmala Biosphere Reserve =

Biosphere reserve in Jalisco, Mexico

Coordinates: 19.4877°N 104.995°W

- IUCN category Ia (strict nature reserve)(core zone)
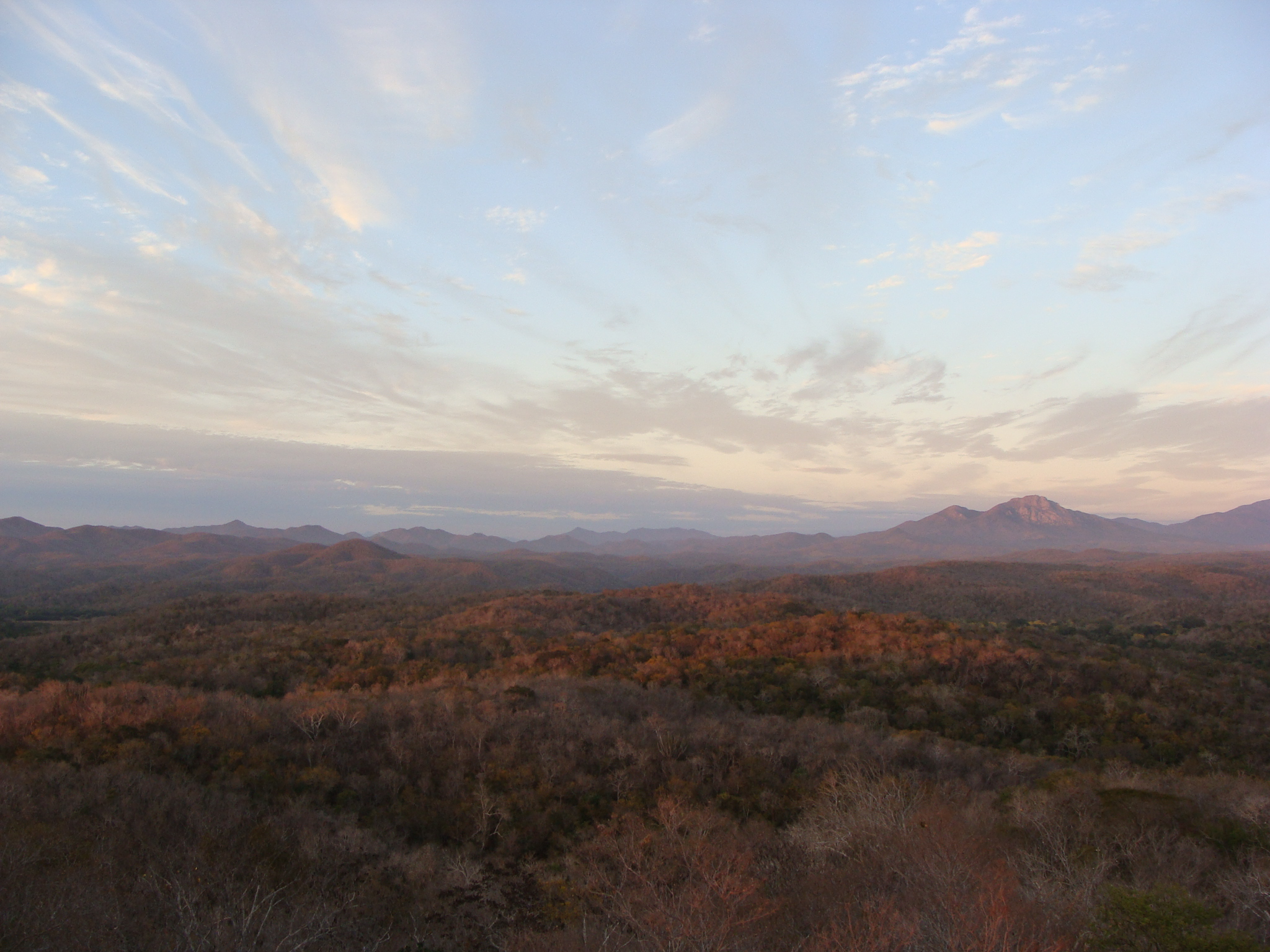
- View north over tropical dry forest within Chamela-Cuixmala
- Area: 131.42 km^{2} (50.74 sq mi)
- Designation: Biosphere reserve
- Designated: 1994 (national) 2006 (international)
- Administrator: National Commission of Natural Protected Areas and National Autonomous University of Mexico

Ramsar Wetland
- Official name: Reserva de la Biosfera Chamela-Cuixmala
- Designated: 2 February 2004
- Reference no.: 1334

The Chamela-Cuixmala Biosphere Reserve is a biosphere reserve on the Pacific coast of the Mexican state of Jalisco. The park was founded in 1993 and covers 131.42 square kilometres in La Huerta Municipality. The land is mountainous and contains dry tropical forest and rolling hills and alluvial plains.

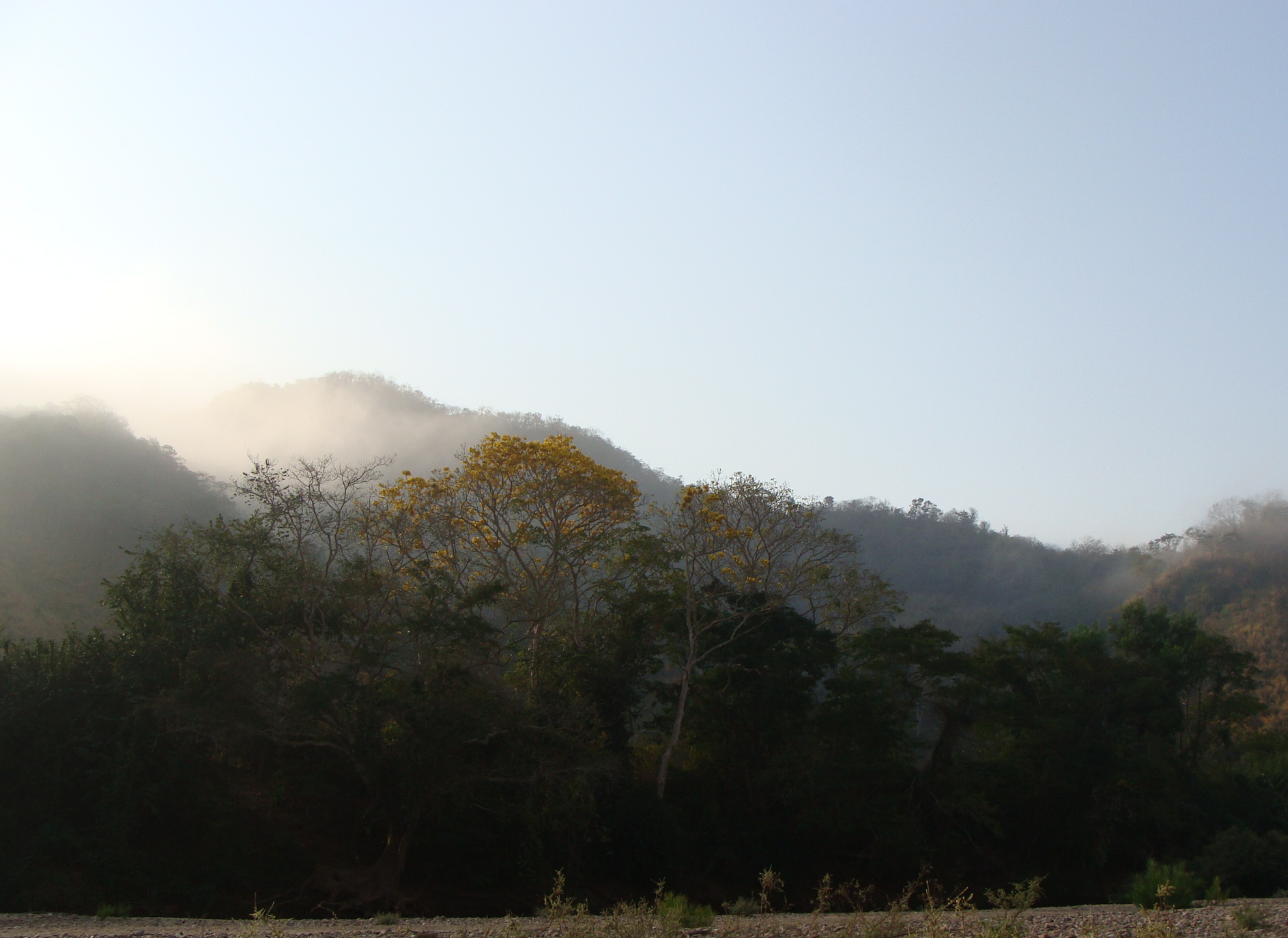
Riparian forest along the Cuixmala River

== Wildlife ==
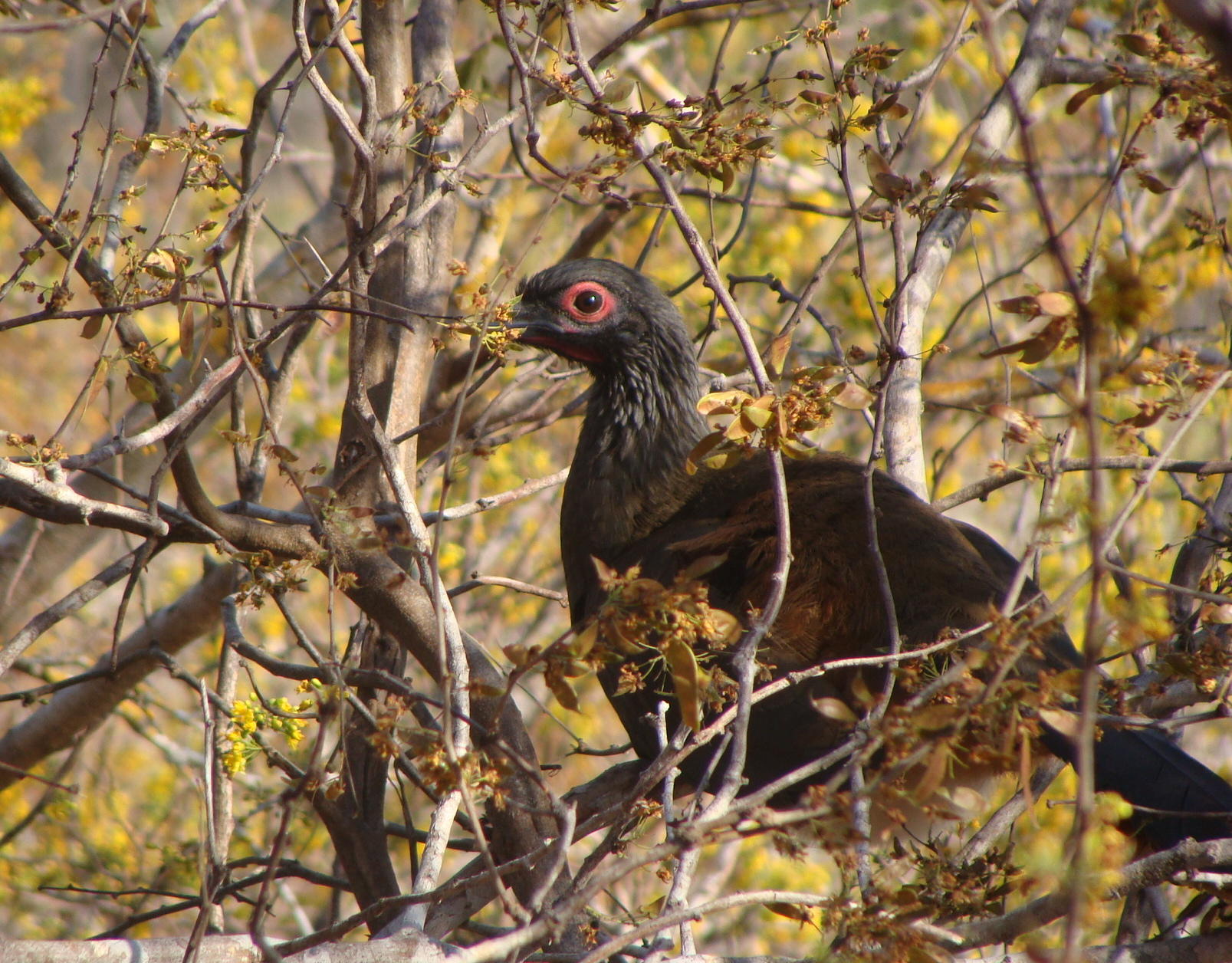
West Mexican Chachalaca, a Pacific Slope endemic, roosting in the forest canopy

Wildlife includes the jaguar, puma, ocelot, jaguarundi, coyote, coati, armadillo, skunk, white tailed deer, peccary, American crocodile, geckos, potoos, hawks, kites, storks, vultures, boas, vipers, coral snakes, toads, frogs, sea turtles, opossums, macaws, and woodpeckers. In addition, the Pacific Slope region of Mexico and the reserve itself supports a high diversity of neotropical migratory bird species during the winter.

== Protection ==
An area of 63.23 km^{2} was designated a biosphere reserve in 1994 by the Mexican government. This area, also known as the core zone (zona nucleo), is managed as a strict nature reserve. The UNESCO biosphere reserve, designated in 2006, encompasses an area of 131.42 km^{2} which overlaps the national biosphere reserve, and extends into Chamela Bay and its islands. The UNESCO reserve includes a larger core area of 82.08 km^{2}, buffer areas of 49.34^{2}, and transitional areas of 12.16 km^{2}.

Both the National Autonomous University of Mexico (UNAM) and the Cuixmala Ecological Foundation, A.C, own most of the land in the reserve. The reserve is threatened by development projects in bordering tracts.

== Biological Station UNAM ==
In 1971, the Biology Institute of the National Autonomous University of Mexico, built a research station.

The main objectives were:

- Preserve the surrounding ecosystems.
- Study the ecosystems structure and function.
- Offer services that help develop investigation and science communication.
