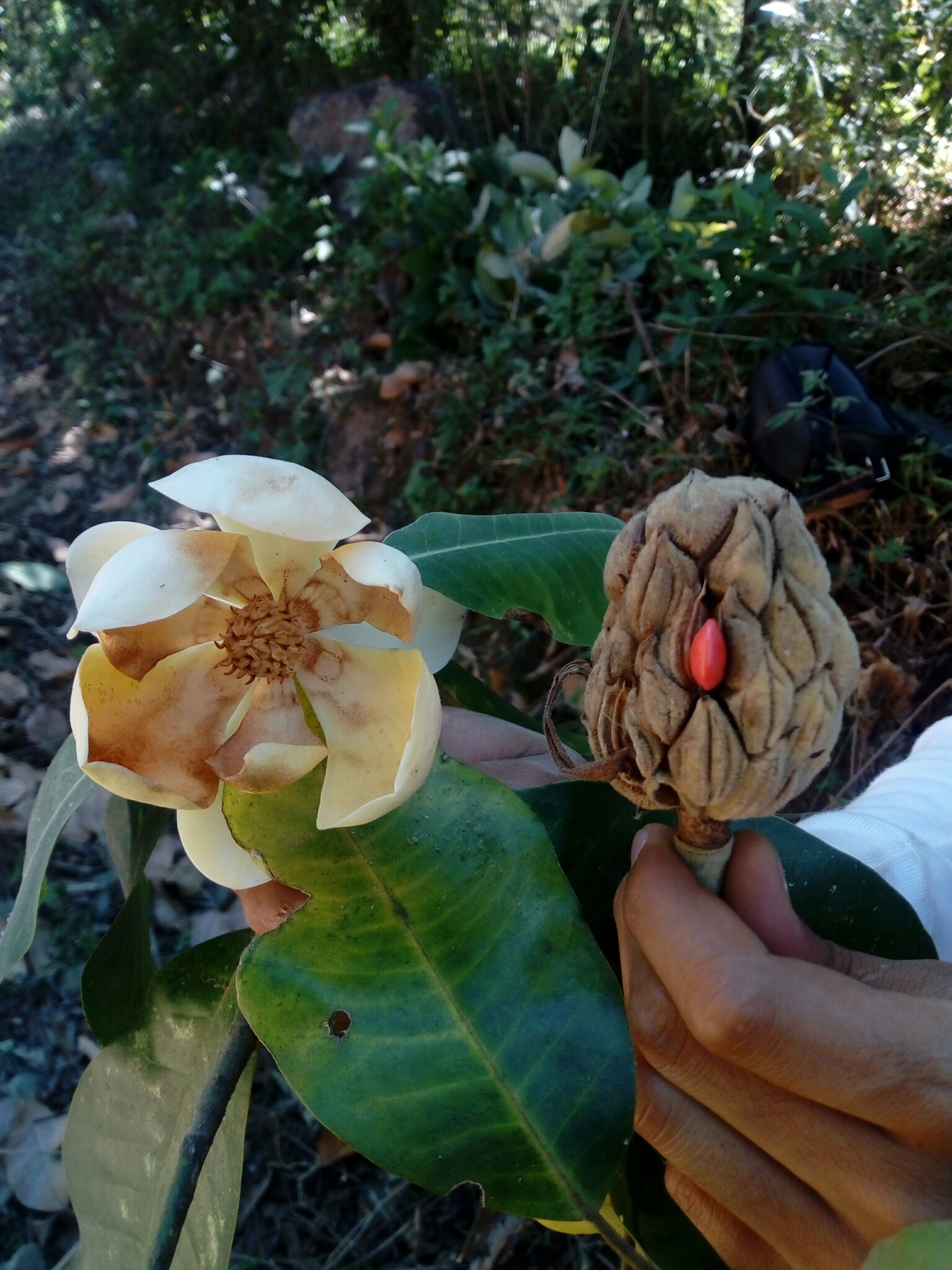

Conservation status
- Vulnerable (IUCN 3.1)

Scientific classification
- Kingdom: Plantae
- Clade: Embryophytes
- Clade: Tracheophytes
- Clade: Spermatophytes
- Clade: Angiosperms
- Clade: Magnoliids
- Order: Magnoliales
- Family: Magnoliaceae
- Genus: Magnolia
- Section: Magnolia sect. Magnolia
- Species: M. iltisiana

Binomial name
- Magnolia iltisiana A.Vázquez

= Magnolia iltisiana =

Species of flowering plant

Magnolia iltisiana is a species of plant in the family Magnoliaceae. It is endemic to Mexico. Common names include ahuatoso and yoloxochitl.

== Description ==
Magnolia iltisiana is a large evergreen tree. It grows up to 40 meters high. with a trunk up to 60–150 cm in diameter.

== Range and habitat ==
Magnolia iltisiana is known from a few localities in the Sierra de Manantlán and Sierra de Cacoma in Jalisco state, and near Morelia in Michoacán, between 800 and 2,400 meters elevation.

In the Manantlán and Cacoma sierras, it grows in moist to very humid montane cloud forests, mostly in ravines and on drier south-facing steep slopes exposed to wind action. It is a canopy tree, and often found in association with oaks (Quercus spp.) and Acer binzayedii.

The species has an area of occupancy (AOO) of less than 500 km^{2}.

== Conservation ==
Magnolia iltisiana has a declining population, and suffers from habitat loss, chiefly from logging for timber and forest clearance for cattle pasture. Its conservation status is assessed as Vulnerable. The populations near Morelia in Michoacán are severely fragmented. The populations in the Cacoma and Manantlán sierras are less fragmented, and many are within the Sierra de Manantlán Biosphere Reserve protected area.
