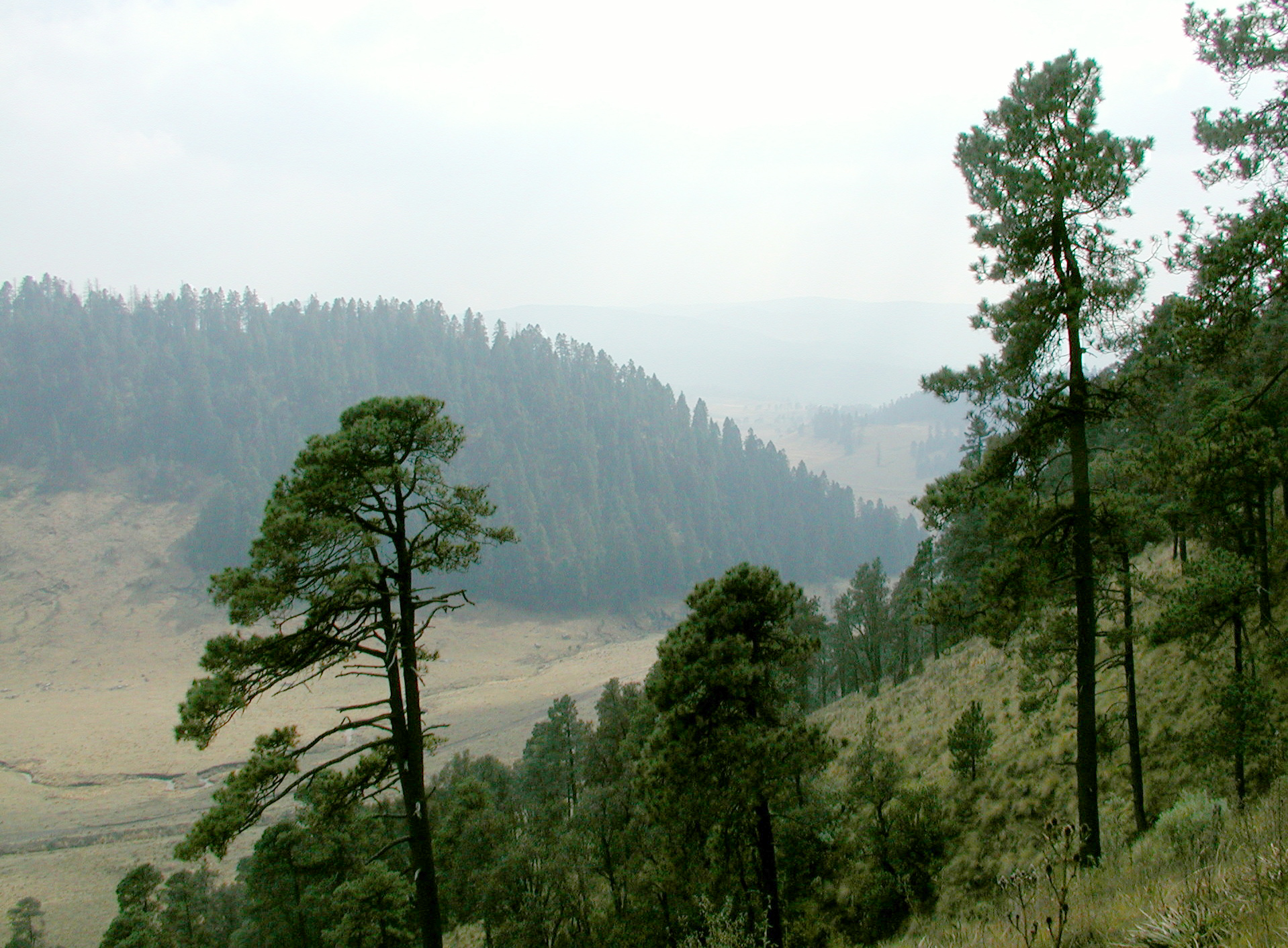
- Hartweg's pines in Marquesa National Forest, between Mexico City and Toluca, Mexico, at about 3,500 m elevation

Conservation status
- Least Concern (IUCN 3.1)

Scientific classification
- Kingdom: Plantae
- Clade: Tracheophytes
- Clade: Gymnospermae
- Division: Pinophyta
- Class: Pinopsida
- Order: Pinales
- Family: Pinaceae
- Genus: Pinus
- Subgenus: P. subg. Pinus
- Section: P. sect. Trifoliae
- Subsection: P. subsect. Ponderosae
- Species: P. hartwegii

Binomial name
- Pinus hartwegii Lindl.
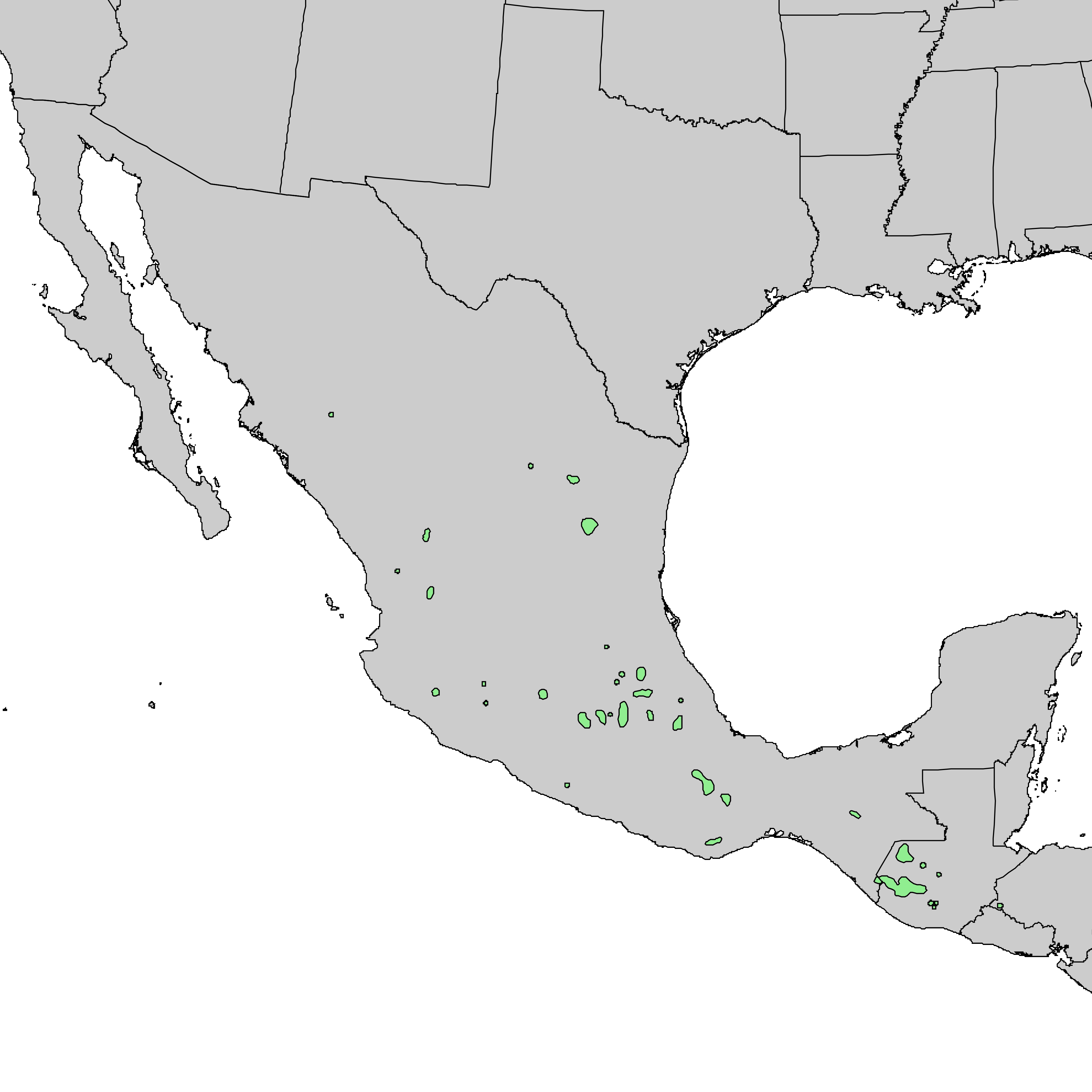
- Native range

= Pinus hartwegii =

Species of conifer

Pinus hartwegii (syn. P. rudis, P. donnell-smithii), Hartweg's pine, the Mexican mountain pine, or pino de las alturas, is a pine native to the mountains of Mexico and Central America east to Honduras. It is named after Karl Theodor Hartweg, who described it in 1838.

== Distribution ==
Pinus hartwegii is a very high elevation species, growing at elevations of 2,500–4,300 metres (8,200–14,100 ft). It forms the alpine tree line on most of Mexico's higher mountains. It grows on both the Sierra Madre Occidental and Sierra Madre Oriental (mountain ranges) (29° North latitude) from Chihuahua State and Nuevo León (26°) to the highest peaks in the mountain ranges on the El Salvador—Honduras border (15° North latitude). In the Sierra Madre Occidental this pine grows with very dry winters and a very heavy rainy season in summer, with constant frosts from October to March.

This pine does not acquire the dwarfed and contorted shape shared by many species at high elevation. Even at the alpine tree line, this tree is not damaged by the cold and wind-blown ice present at that elevation. Consequently, Pinus hartwegii has been studied as an evolutionarily unique member on tree line ecophysiology.

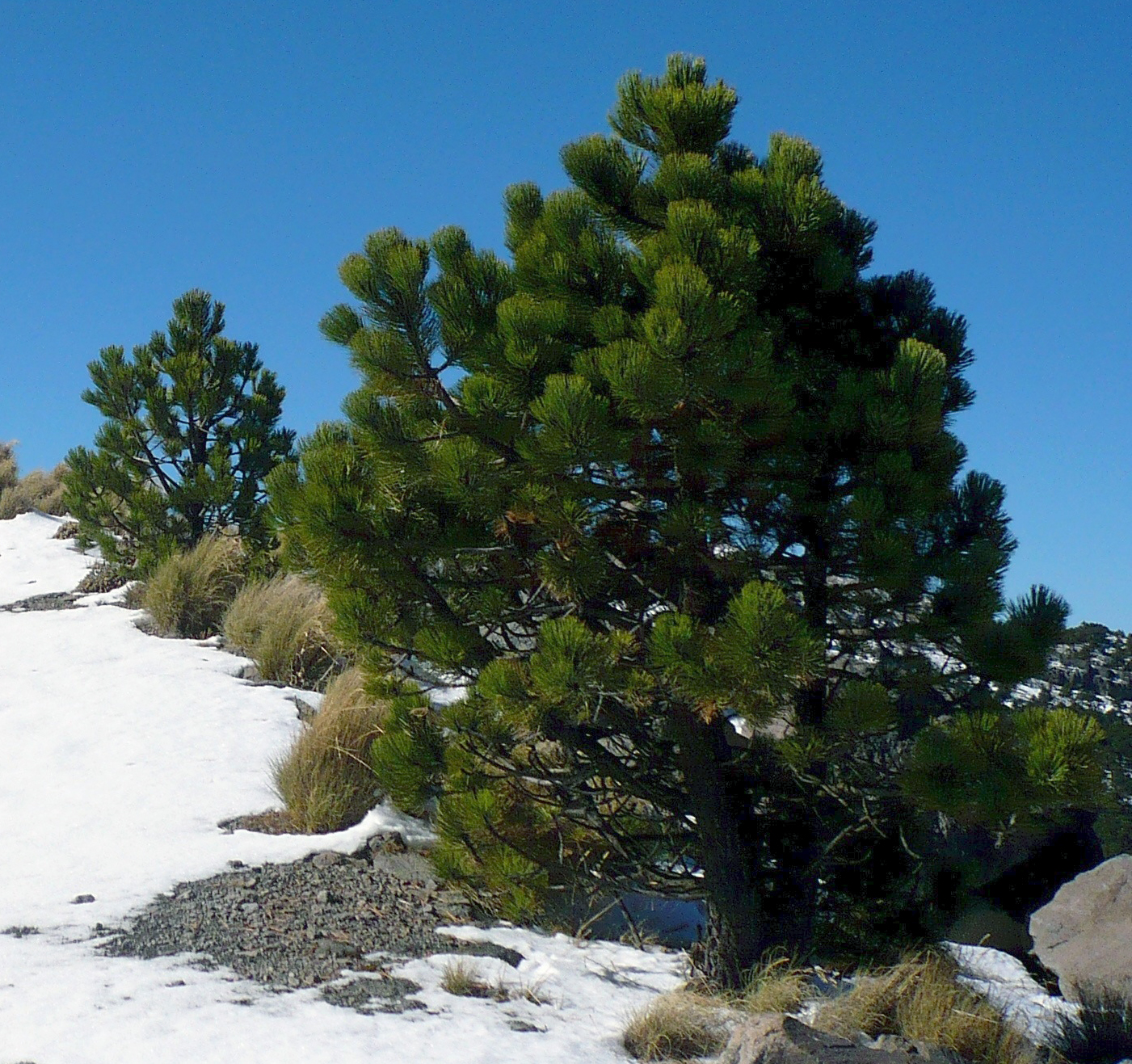
P. hartwegii at treeline (4030m), Cofre de Perote, Mexico

== Description ==
Pinus hartwegii is an evergreen tree reaching 20–30 metres (66–98 ft) in height, with a broad, rounded crown. The bark is thick, dark grey-brown, and scaly or fissured. The leaves are needle-like, dark green, five (occasionally four) per fascicle, 10–20 cm long and 1.2-1.5 mm thick, the persistent fascicle sheath 1.5–2 cm long.

The cones are ovoid, 6–13 cm long, black or very dark purple, opening when mature in spring to 5–7 cm broad. The seeds are winged, 5–6 mm long with a 1.5-2.5 cm wing. Pollination is in late spring, with the cones maturing 20–22 months after.

It is closely related to Pinus montezumae (Montezuma pine), differing from it in the shorter leaves, black (not brown) and smaller cones; it replaces Montezuma pine at high elevations, and often hybridises with it where they meet at middle elevations.
