= Sierra de San Juan Biosphere Reserve =

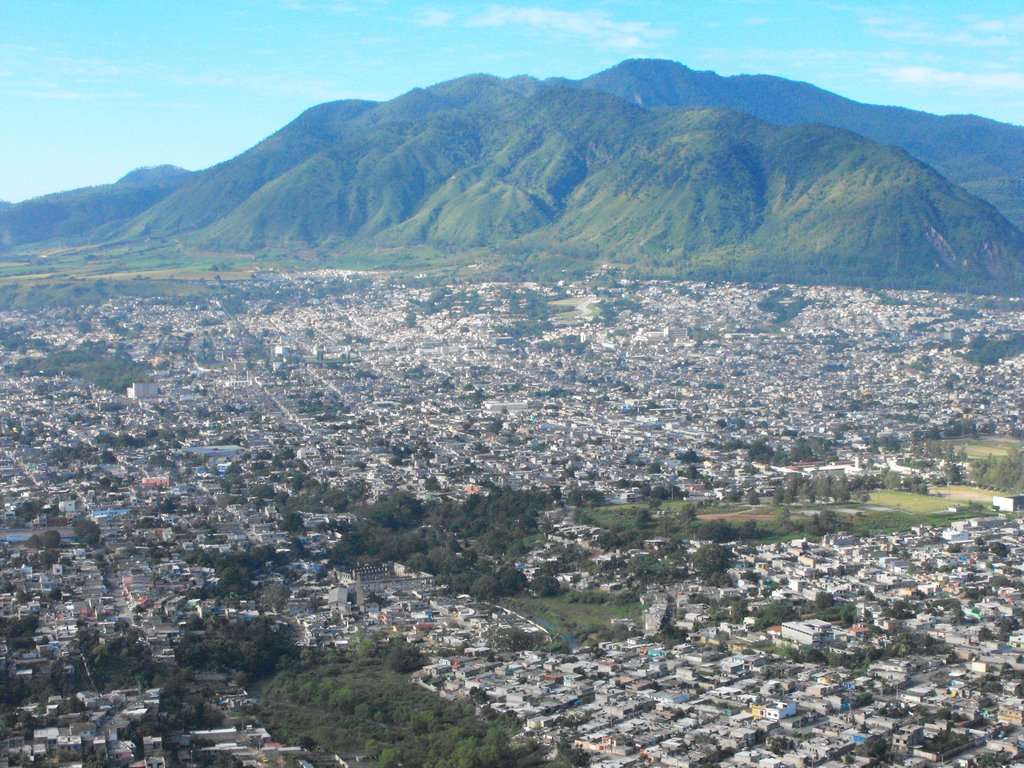
- The Sierra de San Juan, with Tepic in the foreground

- Location within Mexico
- Nearest city: Tepic
- Coordinates: 21°28′30″N 104°57′45″W
- Area: 19,801 ha (76.45 sq mi)
- Designated: 2003

The Sierra de San Juan Biosphere Reserve is a protected area in Nayarit state of western Mexico. It was established in 2003, and has an area of 198.01 km^{2}. It lies just southwest of the city of Tepic. It protects a portion of the Sierra de San Juan, a mountain range which lies between Tepic and the Pacific Ocean.

== Geography ==
The reserve protects the Sierra de San Juan, a western extension if the Trans-Mexican Volcanic Belt. The westward slopes of the range of the Sierra descend towards the Pacific coast, which is only 22 km away. The eastern slopes drain into the valley of the Mololoa River, a northward-flowing tributary of the Río Grande de Santiago. The city of Tepic lies on the Mololola immediately east of the Sierra. The southern Sierra Madre Occidental lies about 15 km north of the Sierra de San Juan.

=== Geology ===
There are twin volcanic peaks in the reserve, Volcán San Juan and Cerro Alto. Cerro Alto is the older and taller of the two, at 2240 meters elevation. Volcán San Juan has an oval-shaped caldera, one by four kilometers, which formed in an eruption about 15,000 years ago. These stratovolcanoes are the westernmost major volcanoes in the Trans-Mexican Volcanic Belt.

== Climate ==
The climate is subhumid and semi-warm at lower elevations, from 900 to 1600 meters. The proximity to the ocean moderates the climate. Rainfall and humidity is generally higher on the coastal westward slopes, while the eastward interior slopes are drier. Above 1600 meters the climate is temperate subhumid, with frequent mists year-round. Average annual rainfall varies from 1300 to 1800 mm.

== Flora and fauna ==
Plant communities vary with elevation, topography, and degree of human disturbance. Natural vegetation at higher elevations includes dry and humid oak forest, pine forest, cloud forest, and grassland. These higher-elevation forests are a southern outlier of the Sierra Madre Occidental pine–oak forests. Dry forests are found at lower elevations, with the Jalisco dry forests along the coast to the west, and the Sinaloan dry forests in the valleys of the Mololoa and Río Grande de Santiago to the east and north.

1250 plant species have been recorded within a 400 km^{2} area, including 30% of Nayarit's total plant species. Native plants include many rare, limited-range, and locally endemic species, including Magnolia pacifica, a limited-range cloud forest native found in the coastal mountains of Nayarit and adjacent Jalisco.

Over 200 bird species have been observed in the reserve, including 17 species of hummingbirds. Native birds include Mexican woodnymph (Thalurania ridgwayi), crested guan (Penelope purpurascens), prairie falcon (Falco mexicanus), common black hawk (Buteogallus anthracinus), hooded oriole (Icterus cucullatus), bumblebee hummingbird (Selasphorus heloisa).

34 mammal species have been recorded in the reserve.

== Conservation ==
The reserve was created in 1987 by the State of Nayarit. The area was decreed a reserva de conservación y equilibrio ecológico y regeneración del medio ambiente (reserve for conservation, ecological balance, and environmental regeneration). Extraction of construction materials was banned, as was any activity which damaged the flora and fauna. The reserve included all portions of the range above the 980 meter contour. and had an area of 25,977 hectares.

71% of the land in the reserve belonged to ejidos (communal agricultural land used and managed by local communities and owned by the Mexican government), with 21% belonging to small private owners, 6% by communities, and 3% urban. The reserve included many cultivated areas, including coffee, banana, sugarcane, and fruit tree plantations. 15,273 people lived within the reserve boundaries, particularly in the northeast where the city of Tepic lay close to the reserve boundary. The reserve was created without much consultation with local people, who feared their land would be appropriated by the government, and the government of Nayarit didn't create a management plan in the early years.

In 2003 the reserve was redesignated a Special Biosphere Reserve, and the boundaries were adjusted. On the drier northern and eastern slopes the lower boundary was raised to the 1080-meter contour, which left some urbanized and cultivated areas outside the reserve. On the western and southern slopes the 980-meter contour was retained. After the boundary adjustment the reserve has an area of 198.01 km^{2} (19801 ha).
