= Sierra de Vallejo =

Protected natural area of western Mexico

Sierra de Vallejo Biosphere Reserve
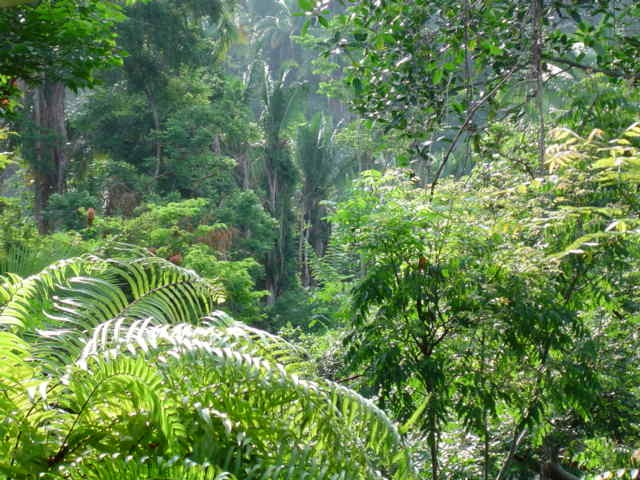
- Location: Nayarit, Mexico
- Nearest city: Puerto Vallarta
- Area: 549.35 km^{2} (212.11 sq mi)
- Designation: Biosphere reserve
- Established: 2004

Sierra de Vallejo Biosphere Reserve is a protected natural area of western Mexico. It protects the Sierra de Vallejo, a Pacific coastal mountain range in southern Nayarit state. The reserve was established in 2004, and covers an area of 549.35 km^{2}.
