= Islas Marías Biosphere Reserve =

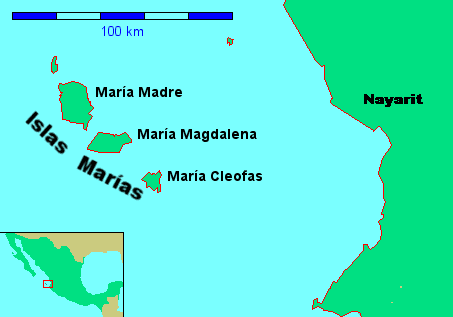
- Location: Islas Marías, Nayarit, Mexico
- Coordinates: 21°41′0″N 107°2′0″W
- Area: 641,284.73 hectares (2,476.0142 sq mi)
- Established: 2010

The Islas Marías (or Mary's Island) Biosphere Reserve (established 2010) is a UNESCO Biosphere Reserve located in the Islas Marías in the municipality (municipio) of San Blas, Nayarit, Mexico. The 641,284.73 hectares (2,476.0142 sq mi) reserve includes ecosystems with a great wealth of species of biological, economic, scientific and cultural relevance. Its biological wealth is to be found in the dry forests of its landscape, in the mangroves, the succulent rosette scrubland, the reefs, coasts and pelagic environments it harbors.

== Human activities ==
Since 1905 the Islas Marías Federal Prison has operated on María Madre Island, using the island’s natural resources. The prison colony is mainly engaged in agriculture, animal husbandry, forest harvesting and fishing. In this respect, in order to protect and conserve the reserve’s natural resources and the ecological processes that take place there, it is important to promote sustainable resource use and guarantee ecosystem conservation and integrity to enable the population of the Penitentiary Colony to remain on the island in the long term.

One of the strategic lines established in the reserve’s Conservation and Management Plan is to include environmental conservation in the social re-adaptation process promoted by the penitentiary authorities, by involving the inhabitants of the penitentiary in natural resource protection and sustainable management activities.

== Ecological characteristics ==
Because of its isolation for over eight million years, Islas Marías' importance as an ecosystem is manifest in its function as a reservoir to Mexico of endemic species. Fifty-four species of land and marine fauna are protected under some risk category and of these, 19 are endemic. Regarding the flora, 11 endemic or restricted distribution taxa have been recorded, together with six species (one endemic) that are included in a risk category according to NOM-059-SEMARNAT-2001. Furthermore, the reserve is an important refuge, nesting and feeding site for large colonies of sea birds.

The marine environment is highly productive, reflected in the great diversity of organisms to be found, such as coral reefs, reef-fish, sharks, rays, turtles and marine mammals.

== Flora and fauna ==
According to the National Biodiversity Information System of Comisión Nacional para el Conocimiento y Uso de la Biodiversidad (CONABIO) in Islas Marías Biosphere Reserve there are over 945 plant and animal species from which 29 are in at risk category and 12 are exotics.

== Sources ==
This article incorporates text from a free content work. Licensed under CC-BY-SA IGO 3.0. Text taken from "UNESCO - MAB Biosphere Reserves Directory". "Licensing page".
