= Pinus jaliscana =

Conservation status
- Near Threatened (IUCN 3.1)

Scientific classification
- Kingdom: Plantae
- Clade: Tracheophytes
- Clade: Gymnosperms
- Division: Pinophyta
- Class: Pinopsida
- Order: Pinales
- Family: Pinaceae
- Genus: Pinus
- Subgenus: P. subg. Pinus
- Section: P. sect. Trifoliae
- Subsection: P. subsect. Australes
- Species: P. jaliscana

Binomial name
- Pinus jaliscana Perez de la Rosa

Species of conifer

Pinus jaliscana, the Jalisco pine, is a species of conifer in the family Pinaceae.

A pine, it is endemic to southwestern Mexico, native to the Pacific slopes of the Sierra Madre del Sur within western Jalisco state, with populations in the Sierra de Cuale and Sierra el Tuito and south of Villa Purificación from 700 to 2,000 meters elevation. It is threatened by habitat loss.

== Sources ==
- IUCN Red List of all Threatened Species
