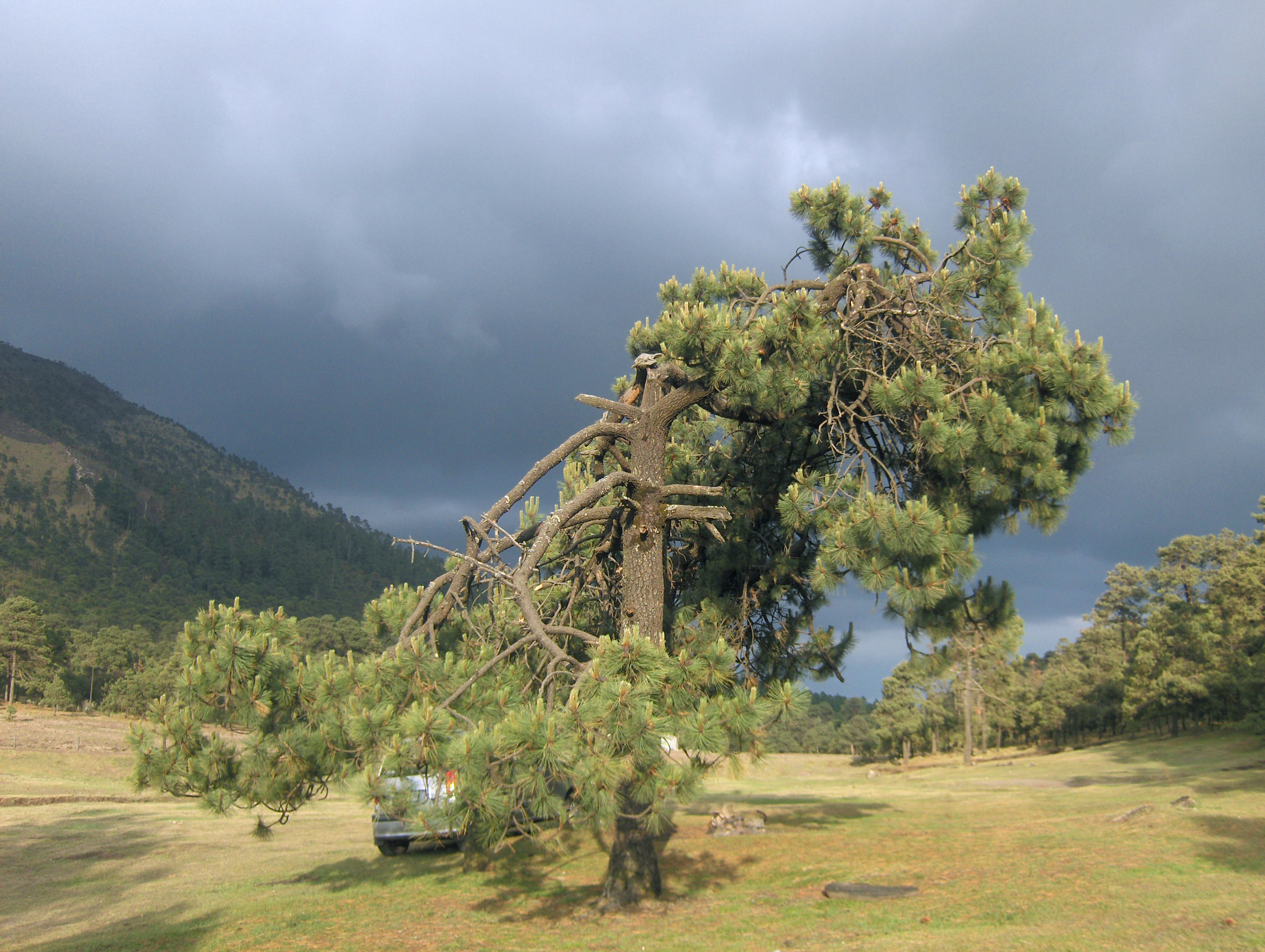
- Pinus montezumae near Ajusco, Mexico

Conservation status
- Least Concern (IUCN 3.1)

Scientific classification
- Kingdom: Plantae
- Clade: Tracheophytes
- Clade: Gymnospermae
- Division: Pinophyta
- Class: Pinopsida
- Order: Pinales
- Family: Pinaceae
- Genus: Pinus
- Subgenus: P. subg. Pinus
- Section: P. sect. Trifoliae
- Subsection: P. subsect. Ponderosae
- Species: P. montezumae

Binomial name
- Pinus montezumae Lamb.
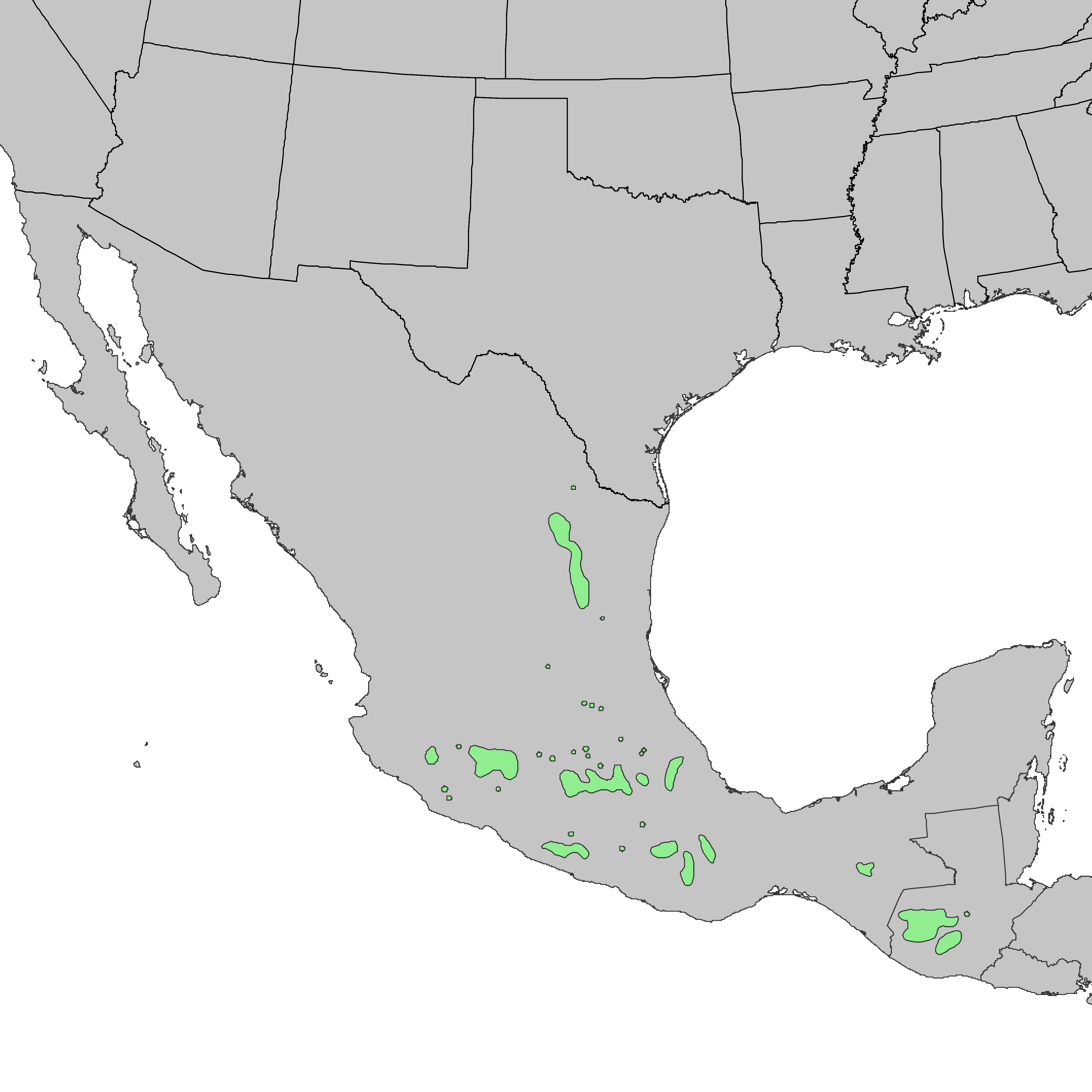
- Natural range of Pinus montezumae

= Pinus montezumae =

Species of conifer

Pinus montezumae, known as the Montezuma pine, is a species of conifer in the family Pinaceae. It is native to Mexico and Central America, where it is one of many pines known as ocote.

== Description ==
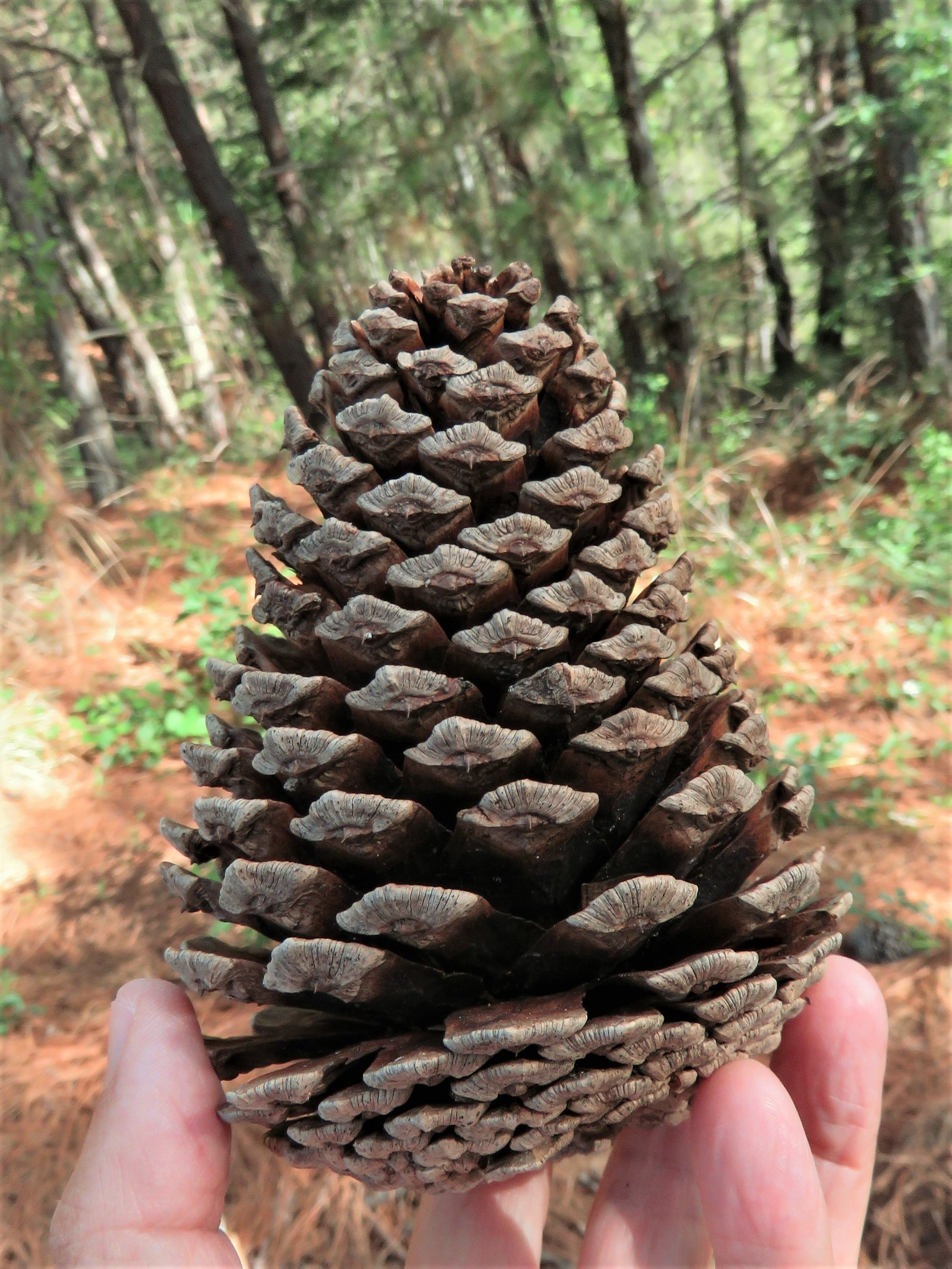
Cone, from Mesa del Oso, Nuevo León, Mexico

The tree grows about 35 m high and 80 cm in trunk diameter; occasionally it may reach a height of 40 m and diameter of 1 m. It has a rounded crown. The bark is dark brown. The needles are in fascicles of 5, 20–35 cm long, dark green to glaucous bluish-green. The cones are 8–20 cm long and 5–10 cm broad when open, with stiff scales.

== Distribution ==
It is found from the Mexican states of Nuevo León (26° N. Lat.) to the north and Jalisco (22° N. Lat.) in the west, to Guatemala (15° N. Lat.) in the south. It occurs on both mountain ranges of the Sierra Madre Oriental and Sierra Madre Occidental. It grows at altitudes from 2000–3200 m above sea level. It is found in areas receiving between 800–1000 mm rainfall per year. In most of the tree's habitat, rain falls mostly in summer, but in the state of Veracruz, precipitation is spread year round and the climate is very wet. However, specimens from the state of Jalisco grow in semi-arid places. It occurs in warm temperate to cool climates (18 °C to 10 °C). At the highest altitudes of its distribution, it usually receives snow in the winter.

== Taxonomy ==
Pinus montezumae is currently considered monotypic, with no subspecies or varieties; a pine treated as a variety of it as Pinus montezumae var. gordoniana by some authors, is now restored as originally described as a separate species Pinus gordoniana.

== Uses and cultivation ==
The wood is yellowish-brown white, with the heartwood being light brown, hard, heavy and used for construction. It is appreciated for its resin. The resin is so flammable that a cut branch will burn as a torch emitting black smoke when ignited; for this reason, it is very common in Mexico to use ocote wood as a fire starter for campfires and barbecues. Growth is slow in the first three or six years, after this stage it is a fast-growing tree. The cities of Ocotlán in Jalisco Mexico and Ocotal in Nicaragua derive their names from this tree. It is planted in plantages in South Africa and Queensland, Australia at mid altitudes; in Kenya, Malawi, Botswana, Zimbabwe and Bolivia at high altitudes. Trees planted in New Zealand and New South Wales, Australia near sea level have done very well.

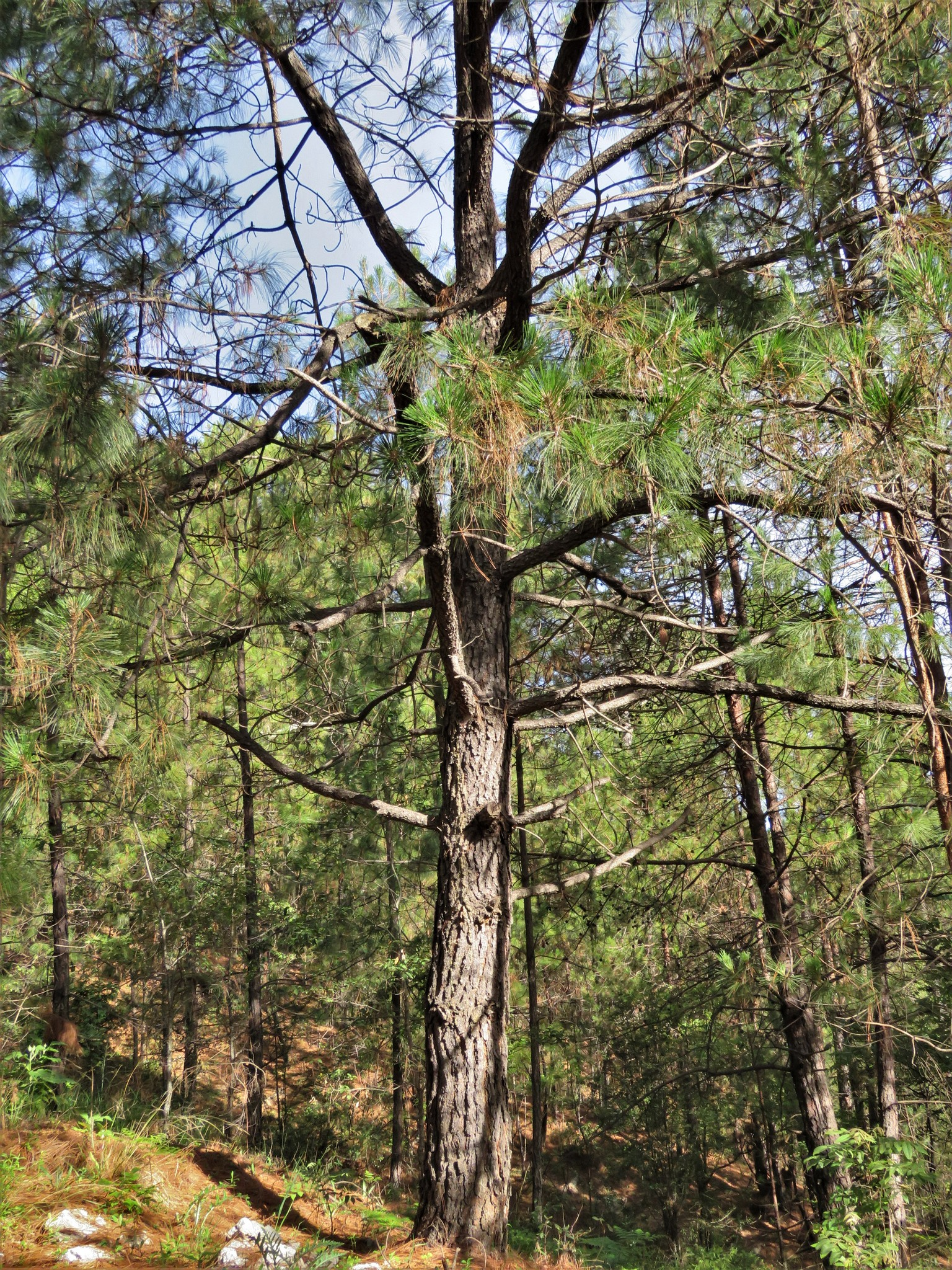
Tree at Mesa del Oso, Nuevo León, Mexico

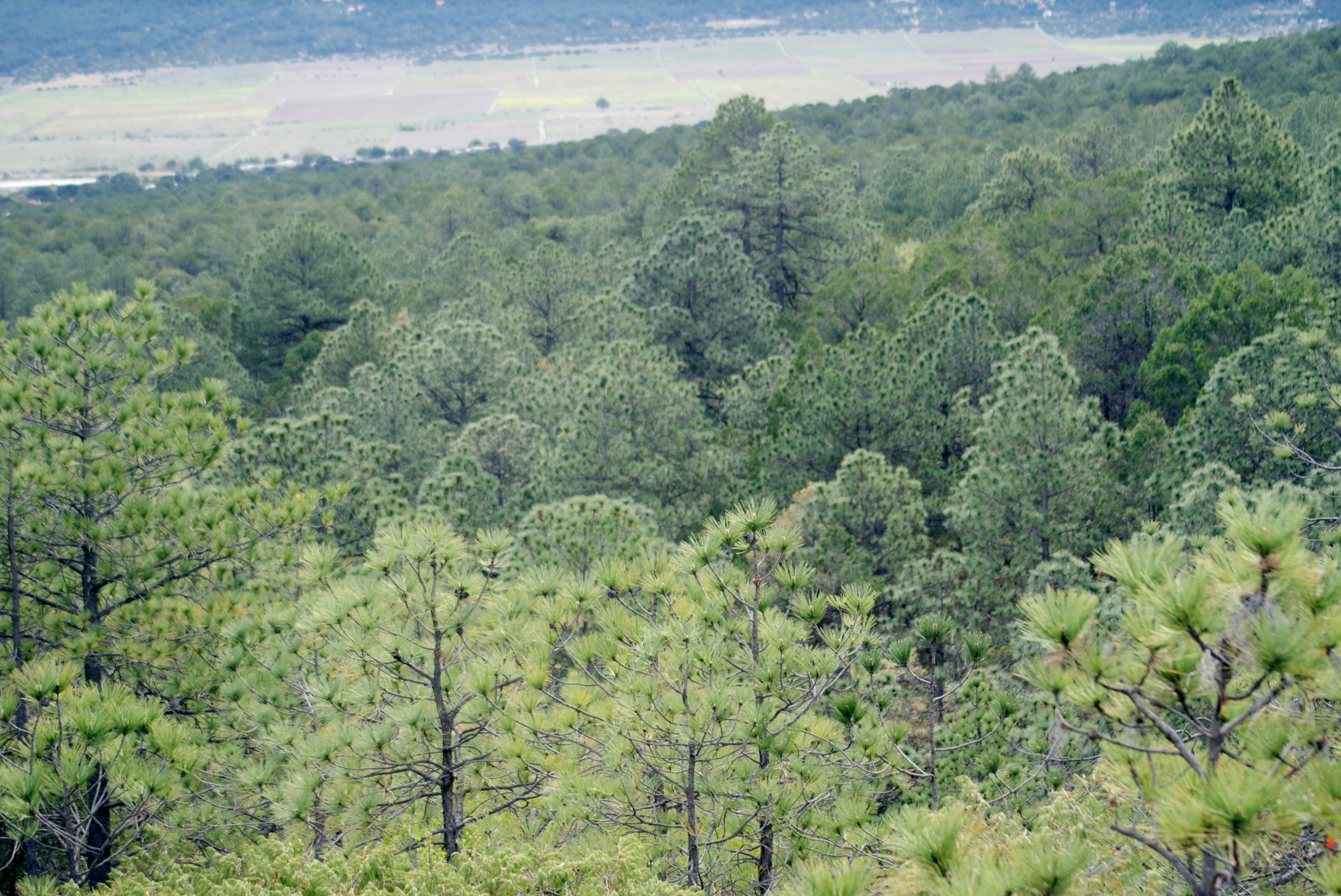
Pinus montezumae forest near Saltillo in Coahuila
