= Balsas dry forests =

Tropical dry broadleaf forest ecoregion in Mexico

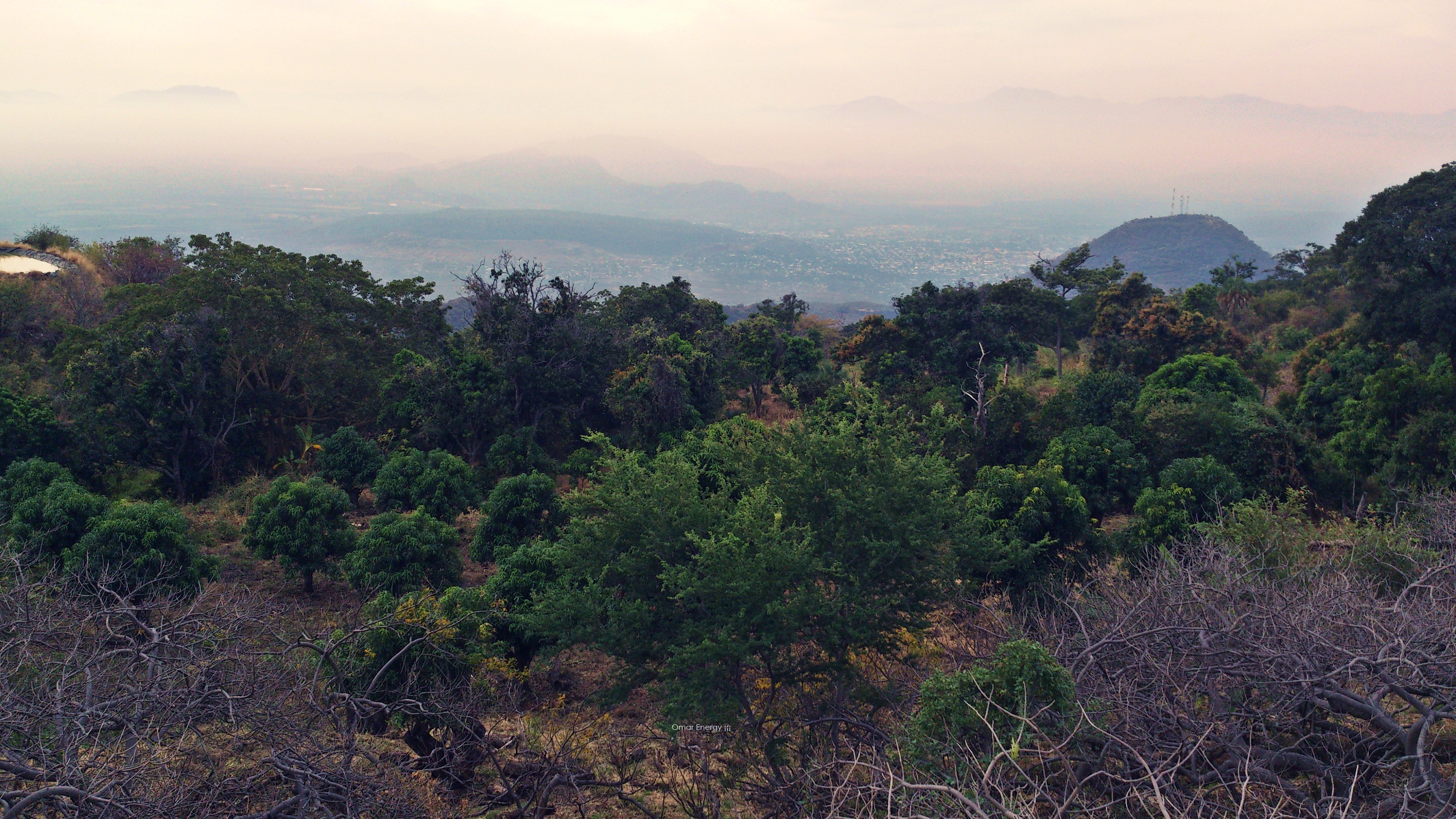
- Dry forest near Apatzingán, Michoacán, Mexico

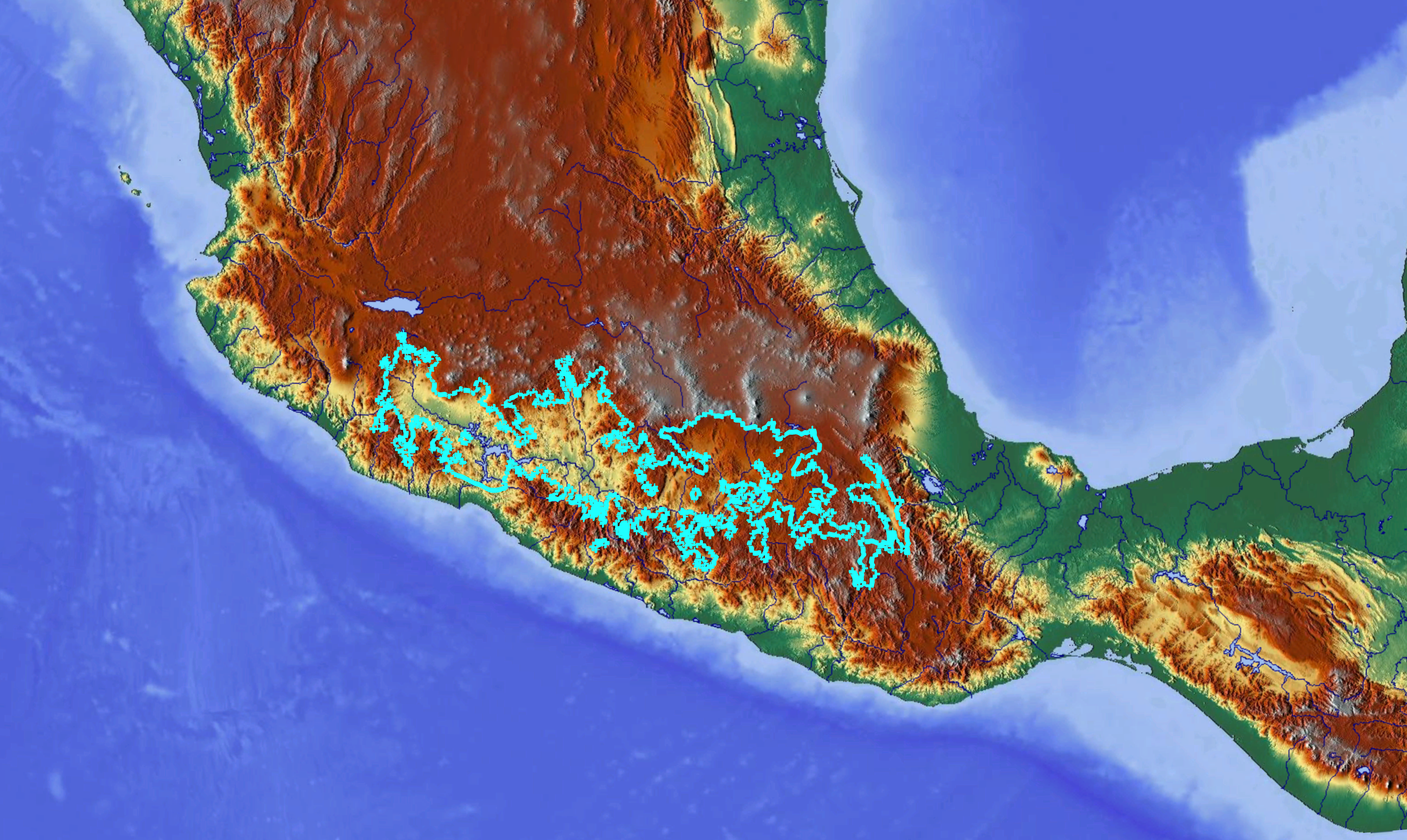
- location of the Balsas dry forests ecoregion encircled in turquoise on a relief map

Ecology
- Realm: Neotropical
- Biome: tropical and subtropical dry broadleaf forests
- Borders: List: Sierra Madre del Sur pine-oak forests; Sierra Madre de Oaxaca pine-oak forests; Southern Pacific dry forests; Tehuacán Valley matorral; Trans-Mexican Volcanic Belt pine-oak forests

Geography
- Area: 37,384 km^{2} (14,434 sq mi)
- Country: Mexico
- States: Guerrero; Mexico; Michoacan; Morelos; Oaxaca; Puebla

Conservation
- Conservation status: Critical/endangered
- Global 200: Mexican dry forests
- Protected: 10.9%%

The Balsas dry forests is a tropical dry broadleaf forest ecoregion located in western and central Mexico.

== Geography ==
The Balsas dry forests occupy the basin of the Balsas River. The ecoregion covers an area of 62,400 square kilometers (24,100 sq mi). The Balsas basin, and the Balsas dry forests, extend east and west between the ranges of the Trans-Mexican Volcanic Belt to the north and the Sierra Madre del Sur to the south.

The Balsas dry forests ecoregion extends across portions of the states of Michoacán, Guerrero, Mexico, Morelos, Puebla, and Oaxaca.

=== surrounding ecoregions ===
The surrounding mountains are home to pine-oak forests: the Trans-Mexican Volcanic Belt pine-oak forests to the north and northwest, the Sierra Madre del Sur pine-oak forests to the south, and the Sierra Madre de Oaxaca pine-oak forests to the east. The xeric Tehuacán Valley matorral lies to the northeast. The Balsas dry forests meet the coastal Southern Pacific dry forests where the Balsas breaks through the Sierra Madre del Sur on its way to the Pacific Ocean.

== Climate ==
The climate of the Balsas dry forests is tropical and subhumid. Rainfall is less than 120 centimeters (47 inches) per year and seasonal, with a dry season that can last up to eight months.

== Flora ==
Plant communities include tropical deciduous forest (selva baja caducifolia or bosque tropical caducifolio) and thorn forest (bosque espinoso), with tropical semideciduous forest (selva mediana subcaducifolia or subperennifolia) in drainages and other areas with deeper soils and more soil moisture.

Characteristic trees include several species of Bursera – Bursera longipes, B. morelensis, B.odorata, etc. – commonly known as palo mulato, fragrant bursera (Bursera fagaroides), and chupandra (Cyrtocarpa procera). Other common trees include pochote (Ceiba parvifolia), brasiletto or mexican logwood (Haematoxylum brasiletto), Lysiloma microphylla, and cazahuate (Ipomoea murucoides). Cacti are common, including species of Pachycereus and Cephalocereus.

The herbaceous layer is generally sparse, with the grasses sideoats grama (Bouteloua curtipendula), Rothrock's grama (Bouteloua barbata var. rothrockii), and Hilaria semplei.

The Balsas dry forests share many species in common with Mexico's Pacific coastal dry forests. Many plant species are endemic to the ecoregion. About 45% of the species at a site in Cañón del Zopilote, Guerrero, and 30% of species at a site in Infiernillo, Michoacán are found only in the Balsas basin. About half of the 45 species of Bursera found in the ecoregion are endemic. The ecoregion is also home to diverse species of Brongniartia, Desmodium, Ipomoea, and Mammillaria.

== Fauna ==
Native mammals include the jaguar (Pantera onca), jaguarundi (Herpailurus yagouaroundi), ocelot (Leopardus pardalis), collared peccary (Tayassu tajacu), coyote (Canis latrans), grey fox (Urocyon cinereoargenteus), white-nosed coati (Nasua narica), and silky pocket mouse (Perognathus flavus), California myotis (Myotis californicus), long-legged myotis (Myotis volans) and western yellow bat (Dasypterus xanthinus).

The Balsas screech owl (Megascops seductus), banded quail (Philortyx fasciatus), black-chested sparrow (Peucaea humeralis), and dusky hummingbird (Phaeoptila sordida) are near-endemic bird species.

Portions of the ecoregion are part of several Important Bird Areas, including Sierra de Taxco–Nevado de Toluca, Cañón del Zopilote, Valle de Tehuacán–Cuicatlán, Cañón de Lobos, Sierra de Huautla, and Papalutla-Tecaballo.

== Protected areas ==
10.9% of the ecoregion is in protected areas. A 2017 assessment found that 1,451 km^{2}, or 4%, of the ecoregion was protected.

Protected areas include:

- Boquerón de Tonalá Flora and Fauna Protection Area
- Chichinautzin Biological Corridor Flora and Fauna Protection Area
- El Tepozteco National Park
- Grutas de Cacahuamilpa National Park
- Sierra de Huautla Biosphere Reserve
- Sierra de Nanchititla Natural Park
- Tehuacán-Cuicatlán Biosphere Reserve
- Zicuirán-Infiernillo Biosphere Reserve

== See also ==
- List of ecoregions in Mexico
