= Sierra de Huautla =

Mountain range and protected area in central Mexico

Sierra de Huautla Biosphere Reserve
- IUCN category VI (protected area with sustainable use of natural resources)
- Location within Mexico
- Location: Morelos, Mexico
- Coordinates: 18°27′N 98°59′W
- Area: 590.31 km^{2} (227.92 sq mi)
- Designation: Biosphere reserve (national and international)
- Designated: 1999 (national) 2006 (international)
- Administrator: National Commission of Natural Protected Areas

The Sierra de Huautla is a mountain range and biosphere reserve in central Mexico. Located in southern Morelos, the Sierra de Huautla is a southern extension of the Trans-Mexican Volcanic Belt range into the Balsas Basin. The dry forests of Sierra are home to a diverse community of animals and plants, and the reserve's outstanding biodiversity is recognized by UNESCO.

== Geography ==
The Sierra de Huautla consists of hills and mountains from 700 to over 2400 meters elevation. They generally run east–west, extending into the Balsas Basin and connecting to the main mass of the Trans-Mexican Volcanic Belt on the northwest. They form the southern boundary of Morelos and extend into adjacent Guerrero and Puebla states. The highest peak is 2440 m.

The Amacuzac River, a tributary of the Balsas River, runs from north to south and bisects the range.

The biosphere reserve covers the central portion of the range, with an area of 590.31 km^{2}. It is mostly within Morelos, with portions extending into Guerrero and Puebla.

== Climate ==
The climate is tropical, warm, and subhumid, with an annual mean temperature of 24 °C. Average annual rainfall is 885 mm, with a wet and a dry season. Temperatures are generally cooler and rainfall higher at higher elevations.

== Flora and fauna ==
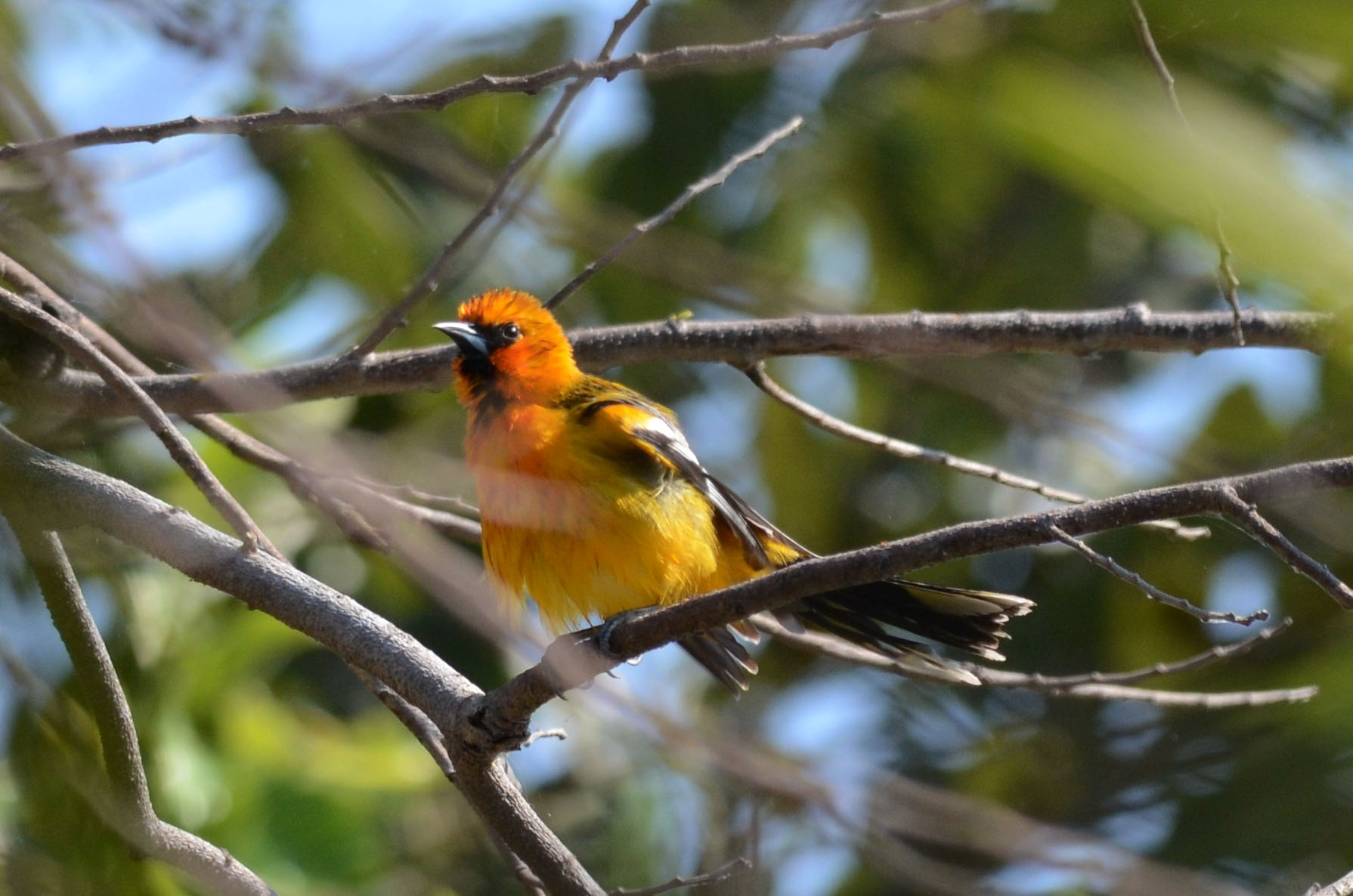
Streak-backed oriole (Icterus pustulatus) in Balneario Las Huertas, Tlaquiltenango, Morelos

According to the National Biodiversity Information System of Comisión Nacional para el Conocimiento y Uso de la Biodiversidad (CONABIO) in Sierra de Huautla Biosphere Reserve there are over 2,465 plant and animal species from which 63 are in at risk category and 88 are exotics.

The flora varies with elevation, soils, and exposure. The reserve has 939 species of native vascular plants, including several endemic and limited-range species.

The main plant community at lower elevations is tropical dry forest. The forests have a low open canopy, and many trees lose their leaves during the dry season. Dominant tree genera include Conzattia, Lysiloma, Bursera, Ceiba, Acacia, and Mimosa. There are evergreen gallery forests along rivers and streams.

Pine–oak forests occur at higher elevations, mostly west of the Amacuzac River.

The reserve is home to 71 species of mammals, 208 species of birds, 53 species of reptiles, 18 species of amphibians, 14 species of fish, and 44 species of butterflies, including the short-horned baronia butterfly (Baronia brevicornis brevicornis).

Native mammals include puma (Puma concolor), ocelot (Leopardus pardalis), margay (Leopardus wiedii), bobcat (Lynx rufus) and jaguarundi (Herpailurus yagouaroundi), grayish mouse opossum (Tlacuatzin canescens canescens), Allen's yellow bat (Rhogeessa alleni), slender yellow bat (Rhogeessa gracilis), little yellow bat (Rhogeessa parvula major), and Mexican long-tongued bat (Choeronycteris mexicana).

Native birds include a diverse mix of southern tropical dry forest and montane pine–oak forest species, including the red-tailed hawk (Buteo jamaicensis), common black hawk (Buteogallus anthracinus), ferruginous pygmy owl (Glaucidium brasilianum), Balsas screech owl (Megascops seductus), black-vented oriole (Icterus wagleri), hooded oriole (Icterus cucullatus), blue mockingbird (Melanotis caerulescens), military macaw (Ara militaris), rufous-backed thrush (Turdus rufopalliatus), pileated flycatcher (Xenotriccus mexicanus), banded quail (Philortyx fasciatus), grey-breasted woodpecker (Melanerpes hypopolius), black-chested sparrow (Peucaea humeralis), rusty-crowned ground sparrow (Melozone kieneri), happy wren (Pheugopedius felix), West Mexican chachalaca (Ortalis poliocephala), golden-cheeked woodpecker (Melanerpes chrysogenys), dusky hummingbird (Cynanthus sordidus), and Cabanis's seedeater (Amaurospiza concolor). The Sierra is designated an important bird area, as it is home to both globally-threatened species and limited-range species.

== Conservation ==
In 1993 the state of Morelos designated a portion of the Sierra a State Ecological Conservation Area, with an area of 313.14 km^{2}. In 1999 the Mexican government redesignated the ecological conservation area a biosphere reserve, and expanded it to 590.31 km^{2}. UNESCO declared it an international biosphere reserve in 2006.

The main economic activities of people living in and around the reserve are subsistence agriculture and livestock raising. A silver mine in the area closed in the 1990s. Many local people have migrated to cities in Mexico and the United States. There are some local initiatives to grow fruit crops and develop ecotourism to provide a livelihood for local communities.
