= Polystemma atreyui =

Scientific classification
- Kingdom: Plantae
- Clade: Tracheophytes
- Clade: Angiosperms
- Clade: Eudicots
- Clade: Asterids
- Order: Gentianales
- Family: Apocynaceae
- Genus: Polystemma
- Species: P. atreyui

Binomial name
- Polystemma atreyui Pío-León, L.O.Alvarado & S.Islas

Species of flowering plant

Polystemma atreyui is a species of flowering plant in the family Apocynaceae. It is a perennial climbing plant with green to blackish-brown flowers. The species is native to Mexico, and was described in 2024.

== Taxonomy ==
Polystemma atreyui was described by Juan Fernando Pío-León, Leonardo Osvaldo Alvarado-Cárdenas, and Sofia Islas-Hernández in 2024.

== Distribution ==
Polystemma atreyui is native to the seasonally dry tropical biome of Sinaloa and Durango, Mexico. It grows in tropical deciduous forests, at elevations of 30–650 metres (98–2,133 ft).

Polystemma atreyui is found near Bursera grandifolia, Bursera laxiflora, Guazuma ulmifolia, Haematoxylum brasiletto, Jatropha curcas, Ipomoea arborescens, Lysiloma divaricatum, Maclura tinctoria, and Randia.

== Description ==
Polystemma atreyui is a perennial climbing plant. The stems are cylindrical, and have long, simple trichomes.

The leaves are ovate, 3.2–6.4 centimetres (1.3–2.5 in) long, and 2.4–5.3 centimetres (0.94–2.09 in) wide. The leaves have lobes which are 6–8 millimetres (0.24–0.31 in) long, and 1.0–1.3 centimetres (0.39–0.51 in) wide. The leaf edges are smooth. The leaves grow on 4–6 centimetres (1.6–2.4 in) long stems.

The inflorescences are corymbiform cymes with six to ten flowers. The inflorescence stems are 5.5–10.0 millimetres (0.22–0.39 in) long. The flowers are green to blackish-brown, divided into five parts, and grow on 2.1–3.03 millimetres (0.083–0.119 in) long stems. The calyx has sepals which are fused at the base, and a 0.6–1.0 millimetre (0.024–0.039 in) long tube. The calyx lobes are lanceolate, 3.3–4.1 millimetres (0.13–0.16 in) long, and 1.2–1.5 millimetres (0.047–0.059 in) wide. The corolla is circular and flattened, and 2.7–3.2 centimetres (1.1–1.3 in) wide. The corolla tube is 2.5–4.3 millimetres (0.098–0.169 in) long, and 2.8–3.1 millimetres (0.11–0.12 in) wide. The plant flowers from late July to early September.

Mature fruits have been observed in October.

Polystemma atreyui is similar to Polystemma galindoi.

== Etymology ==
Polystemma atreyui is named after Atreyu, a character from The Neverending Story. The describing authors wrote that the character's story was "similar to [their] own work as botanists".
