= Southern Pacific dry forests =

Tropical dry broadleaf forest ecoregion in Mexico

- Location of the Southern Pacific dry forests

Ecology
- Realm: Neotropical
- Biome: tropical and subtropical dry broadleaf forests
- Borders: List: Balsas dry forests; Central American pine–oak forests; Chimalapas montane forests; Jalisco dry forests; Petén–Veracruz moist forests; Sierra Madre de Chiapas moist forests; Sierra Madre de Oaxaca pine–oak forests; Sierra Madre del Sur pine–oak forests

Geography
- Area: 67,266 km^{2} (25,972 sq mi)
- Country: Mexico
- States: Guerrero; Oaxaca, Chiapas

Conservation
- Conservation status: Critical/endangered
- Global 200: Mexican dry forests
- Protected: 6,459 km² (10%)

The Southern Pacific dry forests is a tropical dry broadleaf forest ecoregion in southern Mexico.

== Geography ==
The Southern Pacific dry forests occupy the coastal lowlands and foothills along the Pacific coast of Southern Mexico. The Balsas River marks the western boundary of the ecoregion. The ecoregion extends inland to include the Oaxaca Valley. The ecoregion ranges from sea level to 1400 meters elevation. The ecoregion is bounded on the north by mountains, including the Sierra Madre del Sur, Sierra Madre de Oaxaca, and the Sierra Madre de Chiapas, which are home to montane pine-oak forests and moist forests.

Cities in the ecoregion include Oaxaca, Acapulco, and Zihuatanejo.

== Climate ==
The climate is tropical and semi-arid to sub-humid. Rainfall averages 800 mm per year, falling mostly during the summer rainy season.

== Flora ==
The typical vegetation in the ecoregion is tropical dry deciduous forest. Most trees lose their leaves during the winter dry season. Characteristic trees of the lowlands, typically on limestone-derived soils, are Brosimum alicastrum, Sideroxylon persimile, Godmania aesculifolia, Manilkara zapota, Pterocarpus acapulcensis, Licania arborea, Tabebuia palmeri, Pseudobombax palmeri, Bombax ellipticum, and Plumeria rubra. Foothill forests on soils derived from igneous rocks include Lysiloma divaricatum, Bursera excelsa, and Bursera fagaroides, with Ceiba aesculifolia, Comocladia macrophylla, and Trichilia americana.

The southeastern portion of the ecoregion, along the border of Oaxaca and Chiapas, has a subhumid climate, and average annual rainfall of 1040-1600 mm per year. Characteristic trees of the subhumid forests are plumajillo (Alvaradoa amorphoides), cacho de toro (Bucida macrostachya), brasil (Haematoxylum brasiletto), carnero (Coccoloba floribunda), mulato (Bursera simaruba), copalillo (Bursera bipinnata) and mezquite (Neltuma juliflora).

== Protected areas ==
A 2017 assessment found that 6,459 km², or 10%, of the ecoregion is in protected areas. Approximately 28% of the unprotected area is still forested. Protected areas include La Sepultura Biosphere Reserve, Huatulco National Park, and Lagunas de Chacahua National Park.

== See also ==
- List of ecoregions in Mexico
