= Chimalapas montane forests =

Tropical moist broadleaf forest ecoregion in Mexico

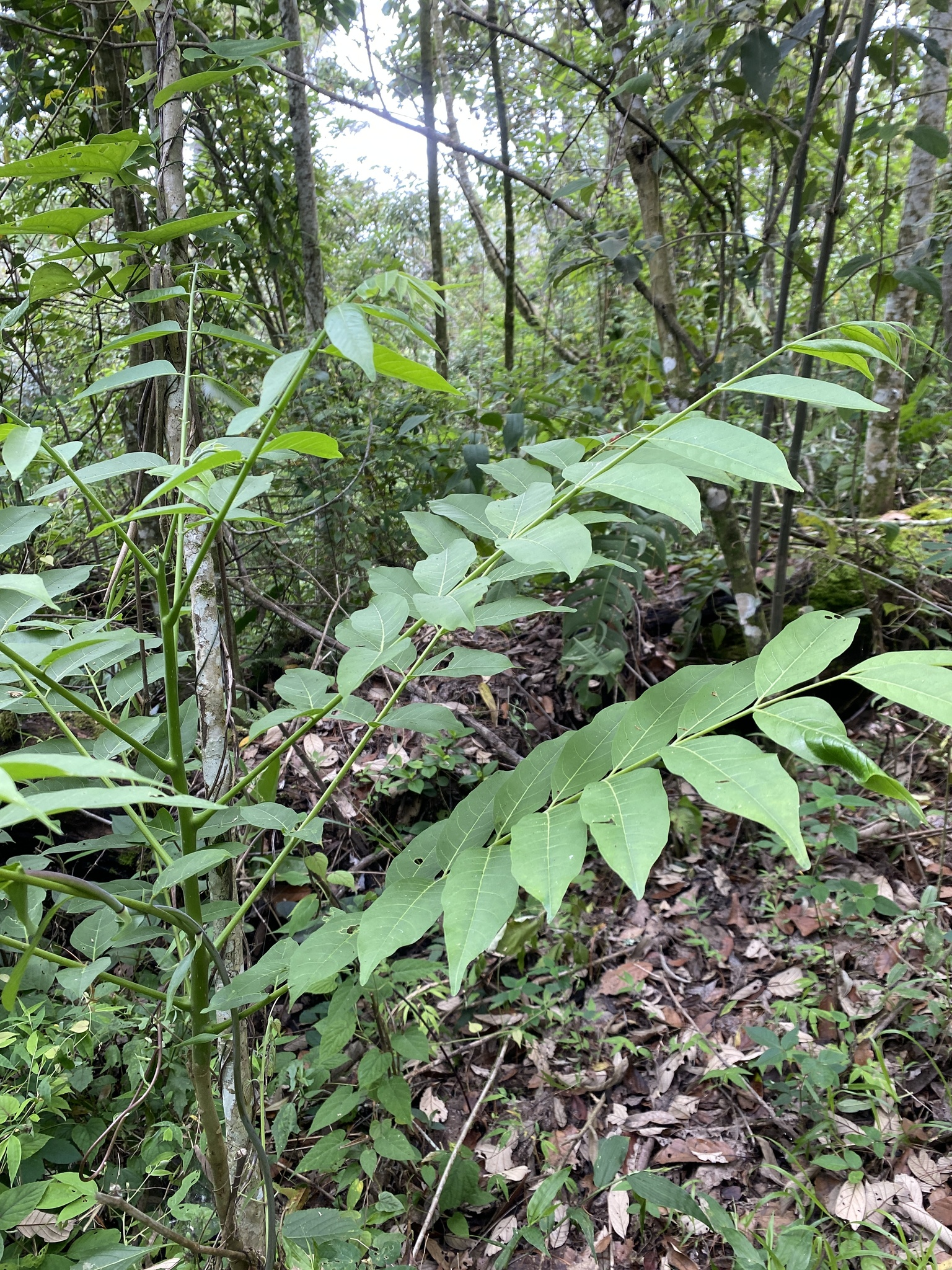
- Mountain forest of Chimalapas in Oaxaca, Mexico

- Location of the Chimalapas montane forests ecoregion

Ecology
- Realm: Neotropical
- Biome: tropical and subtropical moist broadleaf forests
- Borders: List: Central American pine–oak forests; Chiapas Depression dry forests; Petén–Veracruz moist forests; Sierra Madre de Oaxaca pine-oak forests; Southern Pacific dry forests

Geography
- Area: 2,077 km^{2} (802 sq mi)
- Country: Mexico
- States: Chiapas; Oaxaca

Conservation
- Conservation status: Relatively stable/intact
- Protected: 278 km^{2} (13%)

The Chimalapas montane forests is a tropical moist broadleaf forest ecoregion in southern Mexico. It includes the montane tropical forests of the Chimalapas region on the boundary between Chiapas and Oaxaca.

== Geography ==
The Chimalapas region is in the Isthmus of Tehuantepec, and the region's mountains form part of the divide between Mexico's Pacific watersheds to the south and the Gulf of Mexico watersheds to the north. The montane forests are bounded by the lowland Petén–Veracruz moist forests on the north. The Chiapas Depression dry forests lie to the northeast. The montane forests adjoin the Sierra Madre de Oaxaca pine–oak forests on the west, and the Central American pine–oak forests to the east. The Southern Pacific dry forests lie to the south between the mountains and the Pacific Ocean.

== Climate ==
The climate of the ecoregion is tropical and humid. The forests have a cooler climate than the surrounding lowlands, and average annual temperatures decrease with elevation.

== Flora ==
The characteristic plant community is montane tropical evergreen moist forest, also known as cloud forest.

== Fauna ==
In the ecoregion, 281 species of birds have been recorded. They include the solitary eagle (Harpyhaliaetus solitarius), great curassow (Crax rubra), highland guan (Penelopina nigra), wood stork (Mycteria americana), keel-billed motmot (Electron carinatum), southern mealy amazon (Amazona farinosa), and chestnut-headed oropendola (Psarocolius wagleri).

== Protected areas ==
A 2017 assessment found 278 km², or 13%, of the ecoregion is in protected areas. They include El Cordón del Retén Voluntary Conservation Area (153.29 km²).

== Chimalapas Conflict ==
During 2011, the problem in the Chimalapas between Oaxaca and Chiapas over territory boundaries erupted, after more than 45 years in the dispute over the Chimalapas jungles. These have been confrontations between Zoque Chimalapas Oaxacans and Chiapan settlers established on the Oaxaca-Chiapas border.

The Zoque natives who inhabit the Chimalapas of today, to ratify their ownership of those jungles, paid the Spanish crown 25 thousand gold pesos, the same ones that Domingo Pintado delivered in a large morro gourd. That is how the legend and history tell it, recounting that in the remote year of 1685, that character bought 360 square leagues for the people of Santa María Chimalapa, Oaxaca.

Chimalapas was given that name after the Spanish conquest, following the old foundational genealogies of many places whose toponymy was established by naming them for the first time.

These testimonies base the ancestral ownership of the two Oaxacan municipalities located in that microregion of the Isthmus of Tehuantepec: Santa María and San Miguel Chimalapas. Both municipalities have had titles to those lands since March 24, 1687; March 15, 1850; and September 17, 1883. The ownership of the Oaxacan Zoque peoples over that territory was ratified to them with a presidential resolution in 1967, based on their original titles. Due to that antiquity, both populations demanded and achieved municipal status. Furthermore, the ILO Convention 169, signed by Mexico, recognizes the colonial documents as valid.

== See also ==
- List of ecoregions in Mexico
- Chimalapas territory conflict
- Selva Zoque
