= Bursera hollickii =

Conservation status
- Critically Endangered (IUCN 3.1)

Scientific classification
- Kingdom: Plantae
- Clade: Embryophytes
- Clade: Tracheophytes
- Clade: Spermatophytes
- Clade: Angiosperms
- Clade: Eudicots
- Clade: Rosids
- Order: Sapindales
- Family: Burseraceae
- Genus: Bursera
- Species: B. hollickii

Binomial name
- Bursera hollickii (Britton) Fawc. & Rendle 1920

Synonyms
- Terebinthus hollickii Britton 1908; Elaphrium hollickii (Britton) Rose 1911

Species of flowering plant

Bursera hollickii is a species of plant in the Burseraceae family. It is endemic to Jamaica, and listed as critically endangered.

Bursera hollickii is a tree up to 6 metres (20 ft) tall with a trunk up to 25 cm (9.8 in) in diameter. Bark is reddish-gray outside, red inside. Leaves are up to 12 cm (4.7 in) long, clustered at the ends of twigs, thick and leathery with 3-7 leaflets. Flowers are in elongated racemes.
