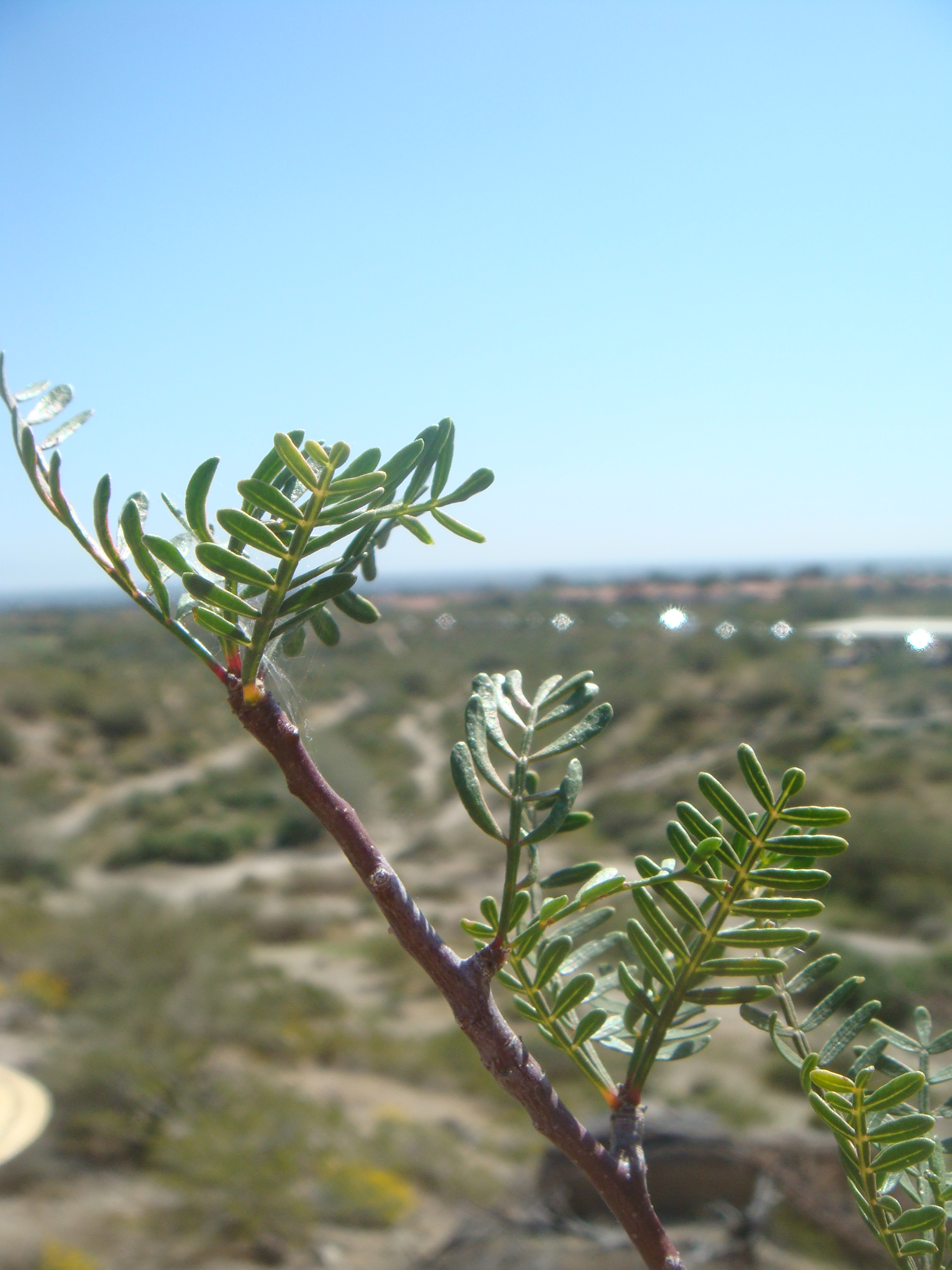

Conservation status
- Least Concern (IUCN 3.1)

Scientific classification
- Kingdom: Plantae
- Clade: Tracheophytes
- Clade: Angiosperms
- Clade: Eudicots
- Clade: Rosids
- Order: Sapindales
- Family: Burseraceae
- Genus: Bursera
- Species: B. microphylla

Binomial name
- Bursera microphylla Gray 1861
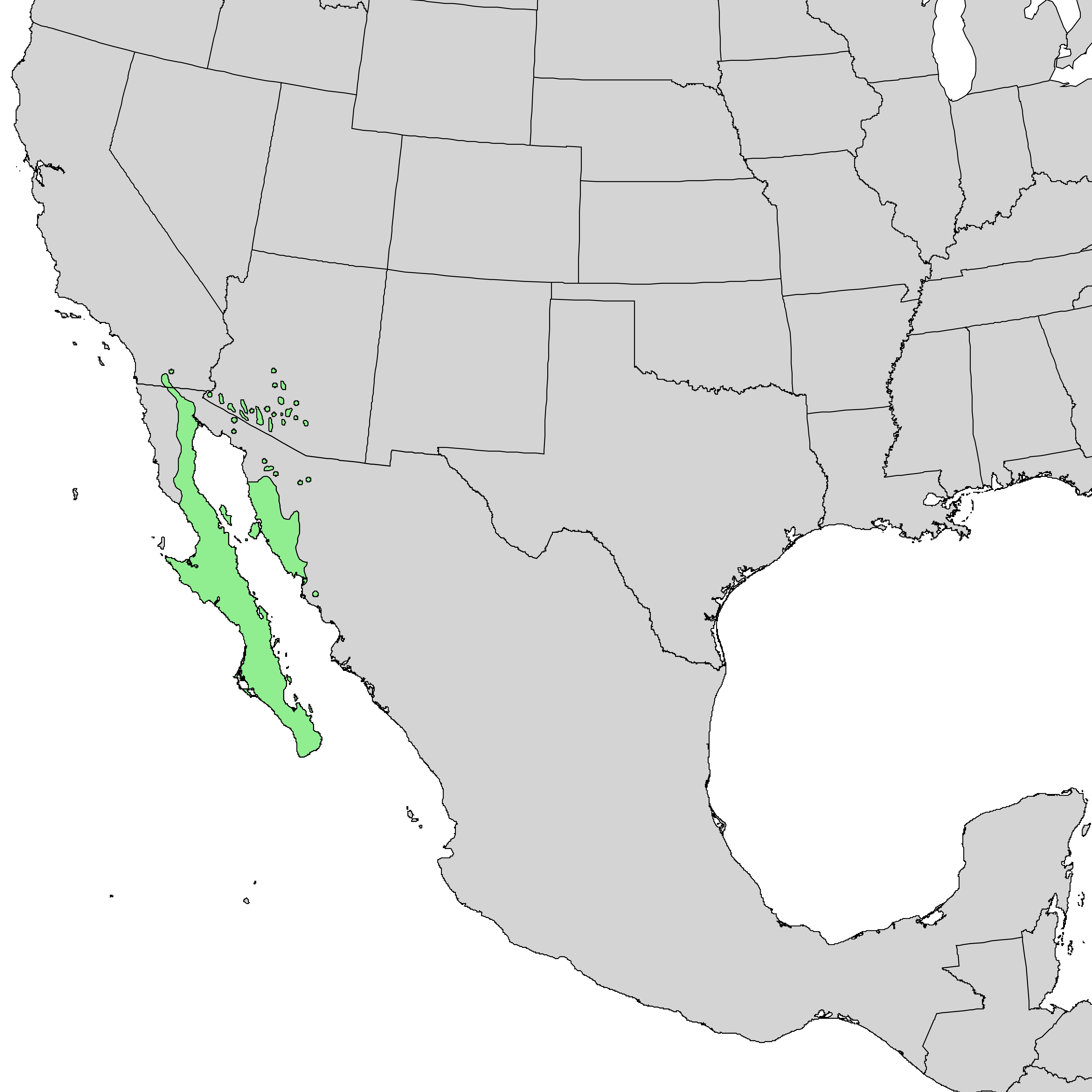
- Natural range of Bursera microphylla

Synonyms
- Elaphrium microphyllum (A. Gray) Rose; Terebinthus microphylla (A. Gray) Rose

= Bursera microphylla =

Species of flowering plant

Bursera microphylla, known by the common name elephant tree in English or 'torote' in Spanish, is a tree in the genus Bursera. It grows into a distinctive sculptural form, with a thickened, water-storing or caudiciform trunk. It is found in the southwestern United States and northwestern Mexico.

== Distribution ==
Bursera microphylla is the most northerly member of the Burseraceae in North America and also perhaps the most xeromorphic (desert-adapted) species within the genus as it thrives in the extremely arid desert hills and mountains in northwest Sonora. This tree is native to northwestern Mexico (Baja California, Baja California Sur, Sinaloa, Sonora and Zacatecas) and the southwestern United States (southern California and Arizona; especially in desert regions. This species can be found within Organ Pipe Cactus National Monument, Cabeza Prieta National Wildlife Refuge, Ironwood Forest National Monument, Sonoran Desert National Monument, El Pinacate y Gran Desierto de Altar Biosphere Reserve, Islas del Golfo de California Biosphere Reserve, Cabo Pulmo National Park, El Vizcaíno Biosphere Reserve, Valle de los Cirios Natural Protected Area, and Sierra de San Pedro Mártir National Park, and Anza-Borrego Desert State Park.

A few individuals can be found in the Fish Creek Badlands of Anza-Borrego Desert State Park, in a location between the Vallecito Mountains and Ocotillo Wells. This small population represents the northernmost extent of the distribution of this species. They are also found throughout South Mountain Park and Preserve, south of downtown Phoenix on the rocky slopes of the Gila, Ma Ha Tuak, and Guadalupe ranges of the Salt River Mountains.

== Description ==
Bursera microphylla is generally a small tree with a thickened trunk and relatively small branching structure in comparison to the trunk size; it is semi-succulent and stores water in the conductive and parenchymal tissues of the trunk, lower limbs, and wood. Shreve (1964) classified the plant as a sarcocaulescent tree. The sarcocaulescent habit acts as a buffer against variation in environmental water balance (Turner et al., 1995). The leaves are alternate, without stipules, and are mostly once-pinnate or twice-pinnate but can be unifoliate or trifoliate in some species (Rzedowski and Kruse 1979). Bursera microphylla reaches up to 10 m (33 ft) in height and its bark is light gray to white, with younger branches having a reddish color. The light foliage is made up of long, straight, flat, legume-like leaves composed of paired leaflets. It flowers in rounded yellow buds which open into small, star-shaped, white or cream flowers. The fruit is a drupe containing a yellow stone.

The leaves are characterized as deciduous, including those on species that occur in tropical subhumid and humid forests (Becerra 2005). As a response to rain and warmer temperatures, B. hindsiana, B. laxiflora, and other more tropical species in Sonora begin to leaf out at any time of the year. Most species are drought deciduous, but B. microphylla keeps their leaves year-round, except under conditions of drought and cold weather. Most of the Sonoran Burseras flower in June and July, just before or just as the leaves are produced. This is probably in response to a lack of rainfall earlier in the summer before the monsoon season as this species is found in the region of Sonora, which lies at the western edge of an area, which regularly experiences summer monsoon storms.

The fruits of species in the genus Bursera are small, drupe-like capsules, each with a single-seed. In B. microphylla, the fruits develop rapidly and ripen gradually, a few at a time, and in some species many fruits remain on the trees as they begin to flower the following summer. Birds appear to be primarily responsible for seed dispersal in Bursera. Gray Vireos and Ash- throated Flycatchers feed heavily on the ripe fruits of B. microphylla in the Puerto Lobos region of Sonora, Mexico during the winter months. The winter range of the Gray Vireo in Sonora closely matches the distribution of Bursera microphylla. Birds do not appear to eat the unripe fruit. Rodents sometimes gather fruits and seeds of Bursera. Ants have been observed carrying away seeds of B. microphylla. It has been suggested that the exfoliating papery bark of many of the trivalvate species may serve to attract the attention of birds and other animals from a distance as it rustles in the breeze (Rzedowski and Kruse 1979).

== Uses ==
- The Cahuilla Indian people of the Colorado Desert region of California reportedly used the red sap of the elephant tree for treating skin disorders and other diseases.
- Seri use the plant in many ways, including the wood for boxes.
- It is popular as a landscape plant in the southwestern US in the low warm desert where it does not freeze.

== Gallery ==
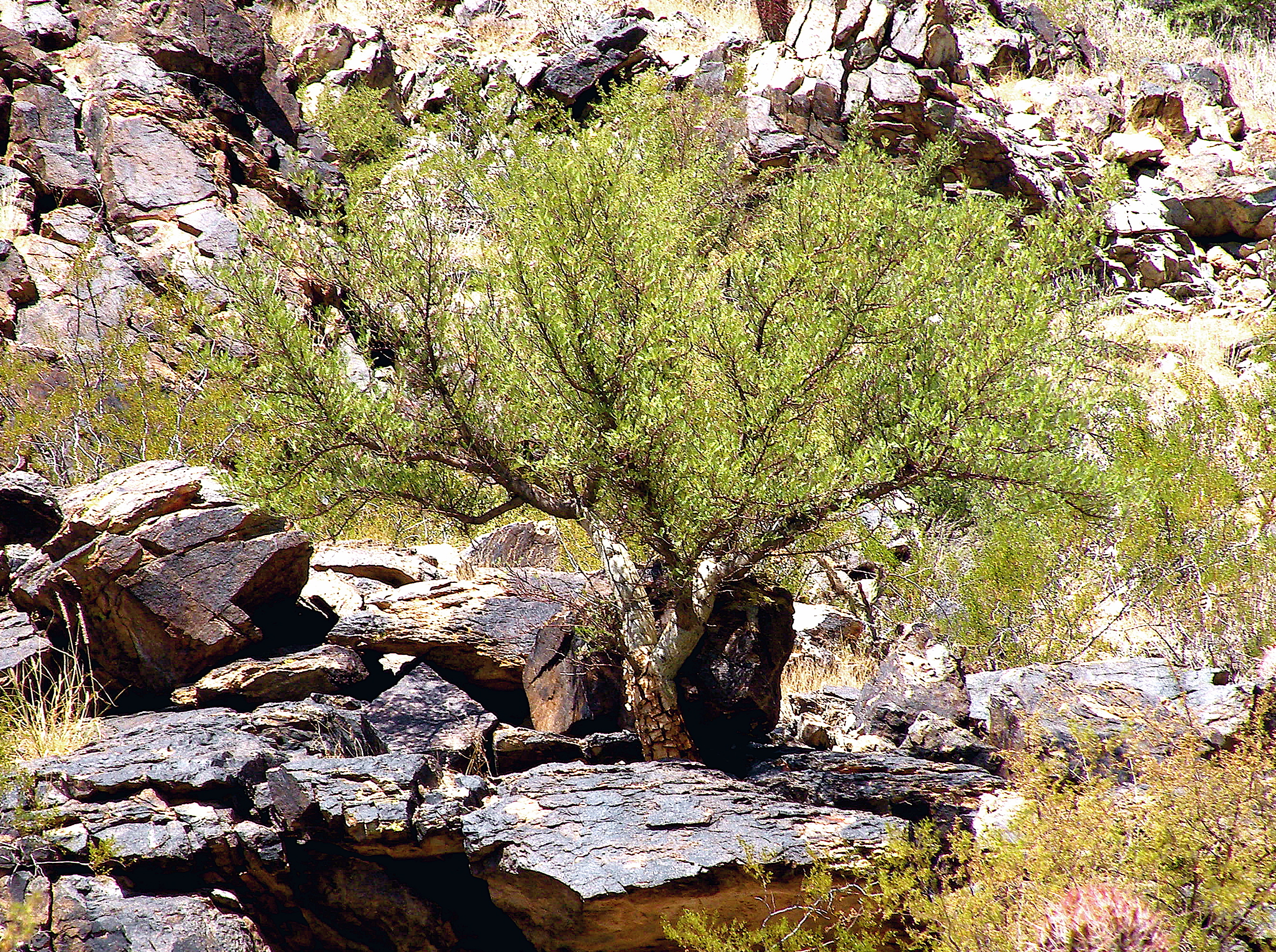
Bursera microphylla on southern slope at South Mountain Municipal Park, Phoenix, Arizona. October 2008. (C. Cordova)

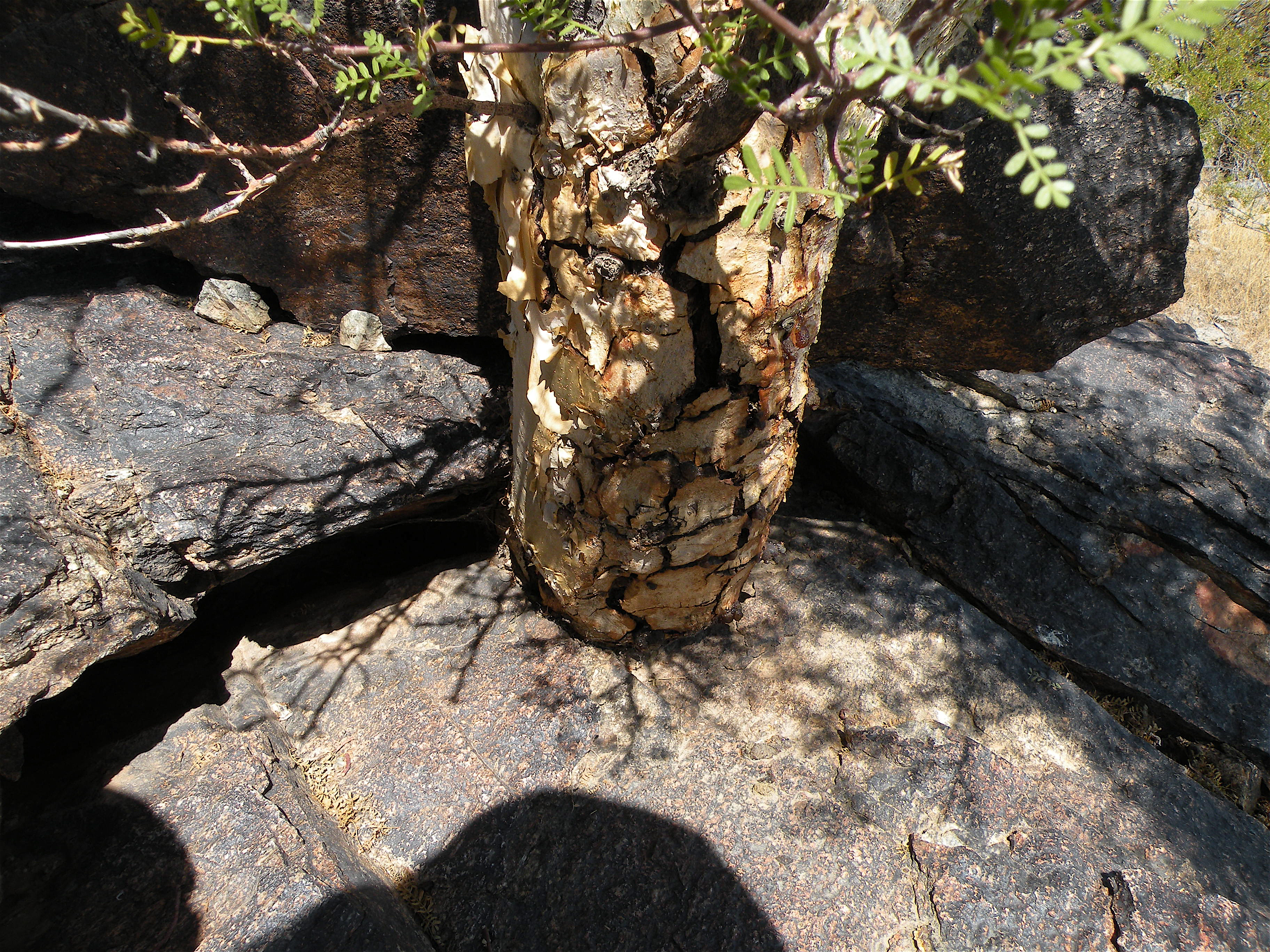
Bursera microphylla growing on a granite boulder at South Mountain Municipal Park, Phoenix, Arizona. October 2008. (C. Cordova)

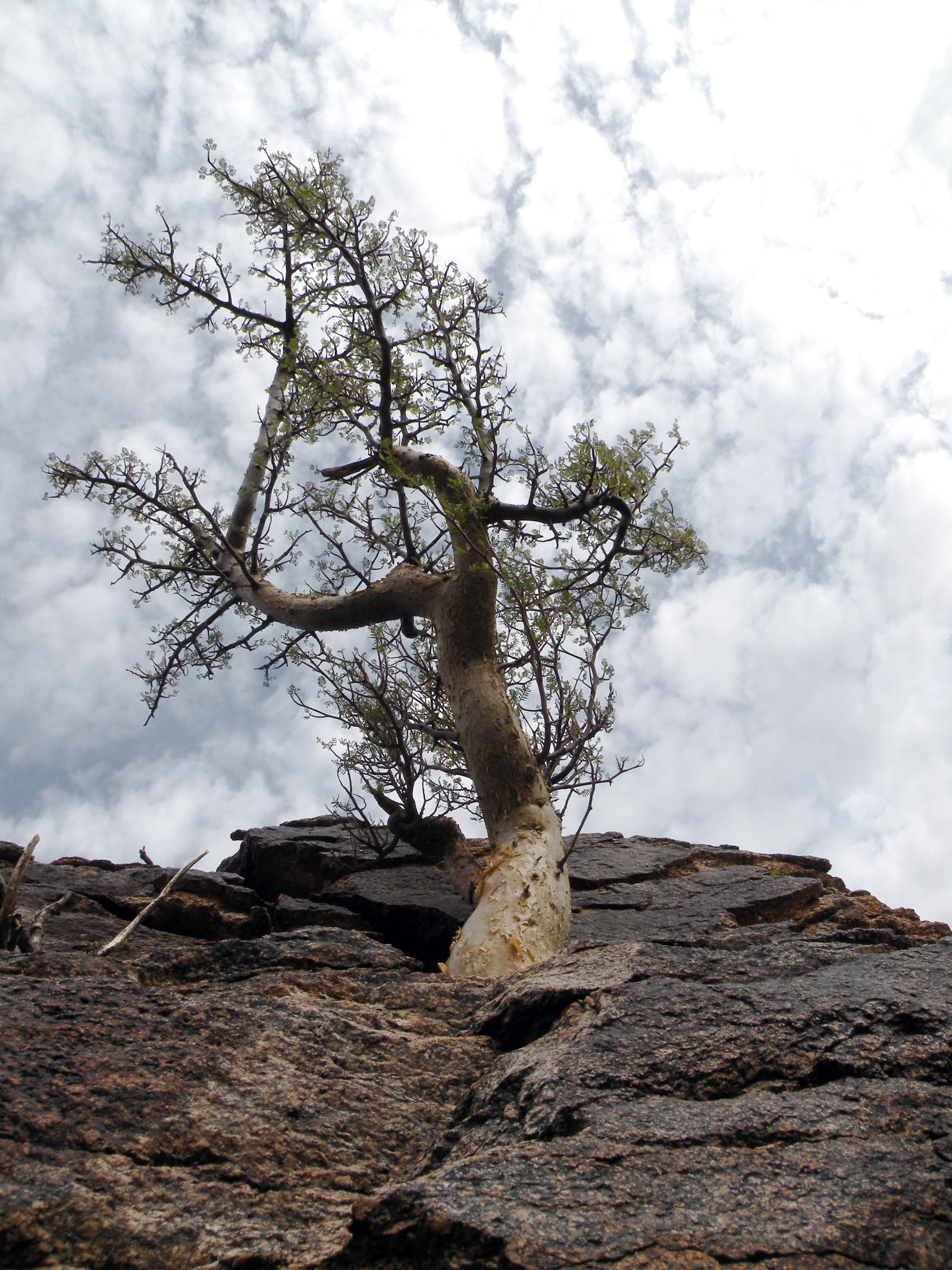
Bursera microphylla growing on a granite boulder at South Mountain Municipal Park, Phoenix, Arizona. January 2010. (C. Cordova)

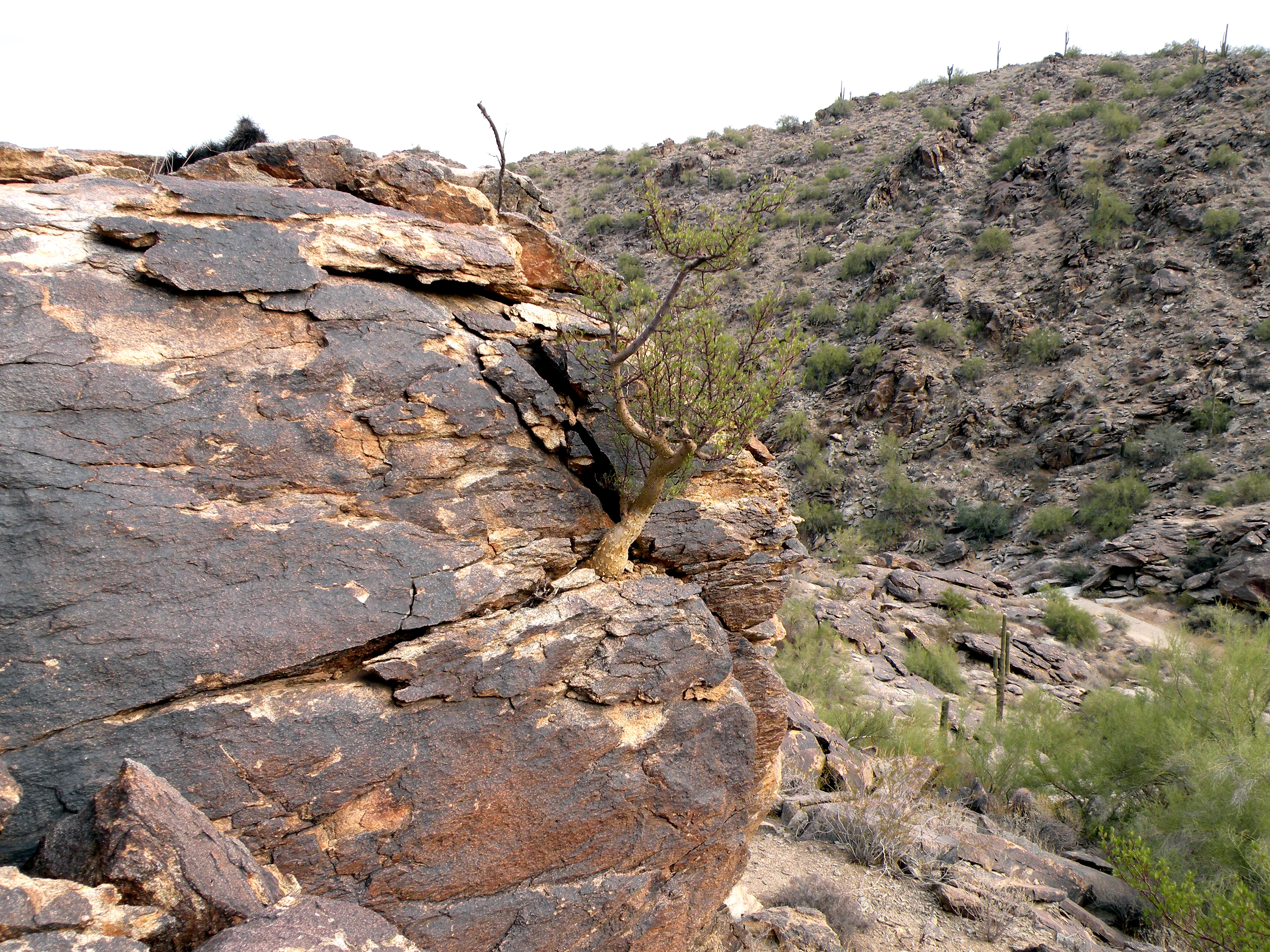
Bursera microphylla growing on a granite boulder at South Mountain Municipal Park, Phoenix, Arizona. January 2010. (C. Cordova)

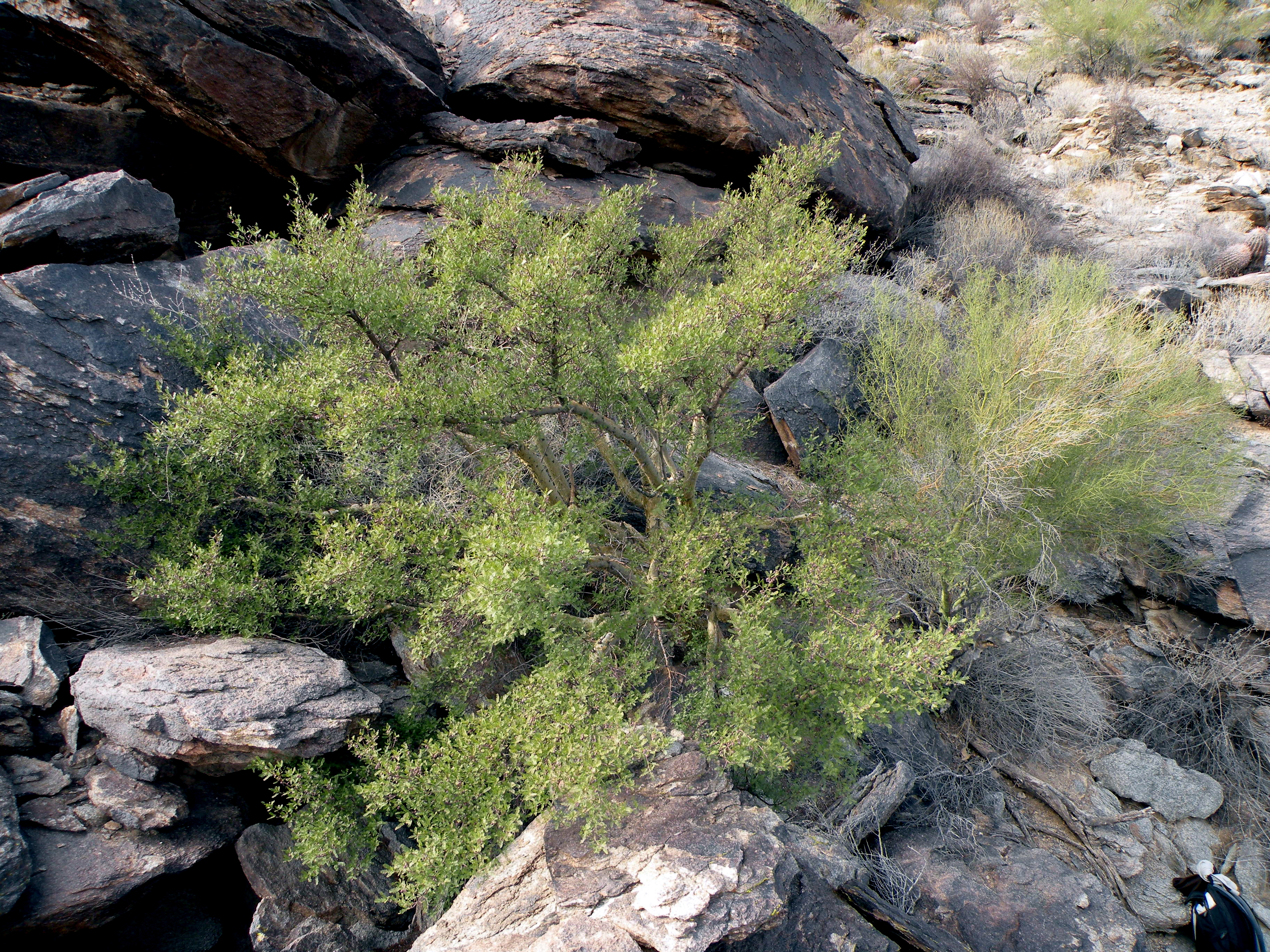
Bursera microphylla growing on granite boulders at South Mountain Municipal Park, Phoenix, Arizona. January 2010. (C. Cordova)

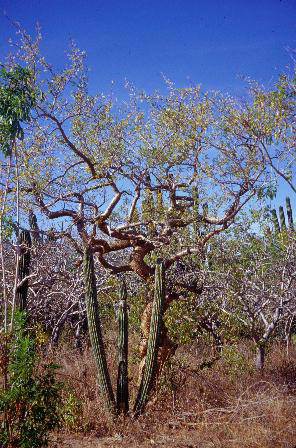
Bursera microphylla in Baja California, Mexico

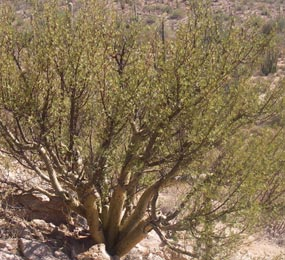
Bursera microphylla in the Sonoran Desert, Arizona, U.S.

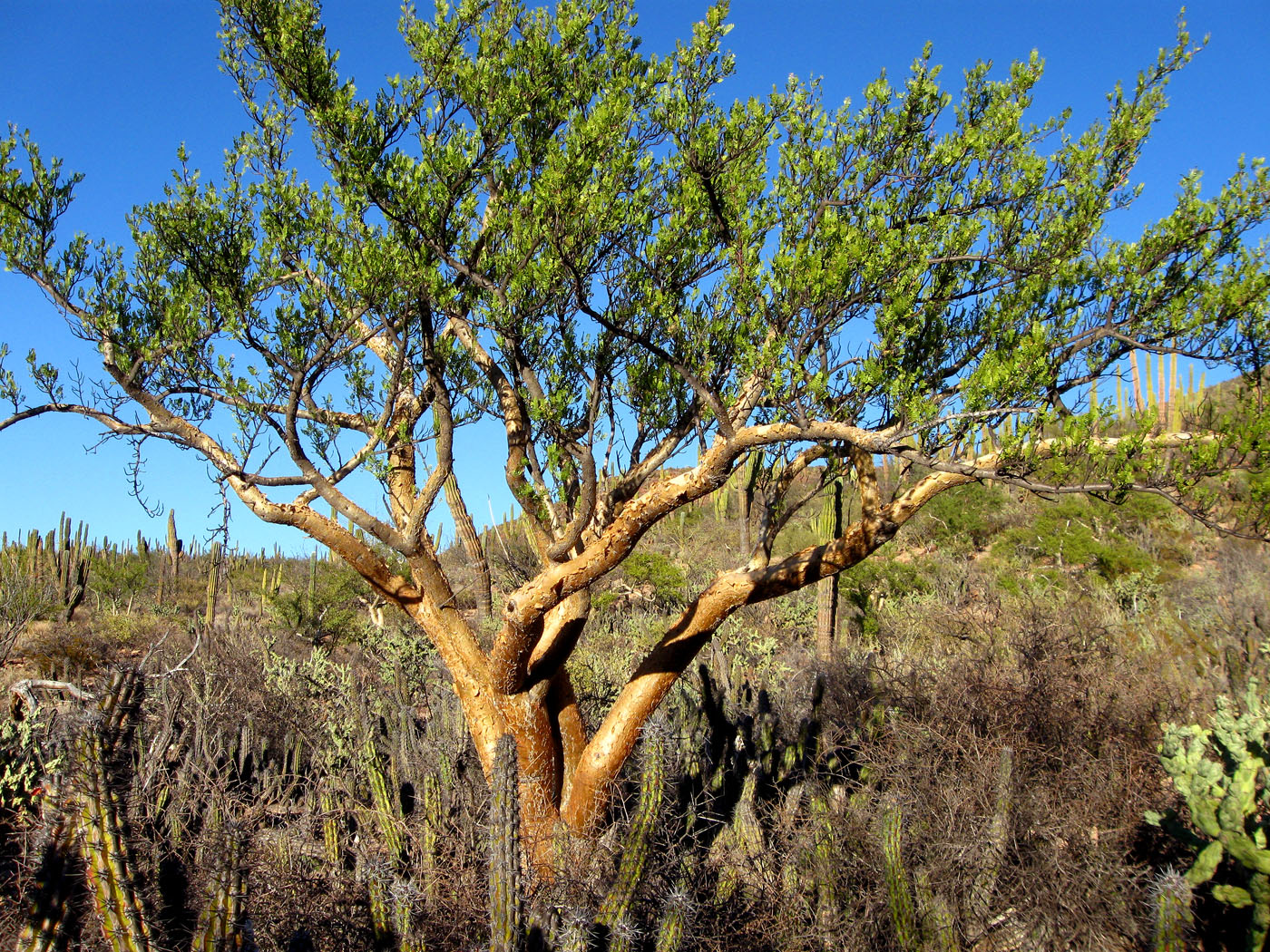
Bursera microphylla in the Vizcaino Desert, Baja California Sur, Mexico

== See also ==
- Bursera fagaroides
