= Polystemma cordatum =

Scientific classification
- Kingdom: Plantae
- Clade: Tracheophytes
- Clade: Angiosperms
- Clade: Eudicots
- Clade: Asterids
- Order: Gentianales
- Family: Apocynaceae
- Genus: Polystemma
- Species: P. cordatum

Binomial name
- Polystemma cordatum (Brandegee) L.O.Alvarado

Synonyms
- Matelea cordata (Brandegee) Woodson; Microdactylon cordatum Brandegee

Species of plants

Polystemma cordatum, synonym Microdactylon cordatum, is a species of plants in the family Apocynaceae, native to the States of Puebla and Oaxaca in Mexico. As Microdactylon cordatum it was the only species in the monotypic genus Microdactylon.
