= Bursera malacophylla =

Conservation status
- Vulnerable (IUCN 2.3)

Scientific classification
- Kingdom: Plantae
- Clade: Tracheophytes
- Clade: Angiosperms
- Clade: Eudicots
- Clade: Rosids
- Order: Sapindales
- Family: Burseraceae
- Genus: Bursera
- Species: B. malacophylla

Binomial name
- Bursera malacophylla B.L.Rob. 1902

Synonyms
- Bursera graveolens subsp. malacophylla (B.L.Rob.) A.Weeks & Tye; Bursera graveolens forma malacophylla (B.L.Rob.) J.F.Macbr.

Species of flowering plant

Bursera malacophylla is a species of plant in the Burseraceae family. It is endemic to Ecuador, found only in the Galápagos Islands, and listed as "vulnerable."

Bursera malacophylla is a tree with grayish-brown bark. Leaves are pinnately compound with 7 or 9 leaflets.
