= Bursera tonkinensis =

Conservation status
- Vulnerable (IUCN 2.3)

Scientific classification
- Kingdom: Plantae
- Clade: Tracheophytes
- Clade: Angiosperms
- Clade: Eudicots
- Clade: Rosids
- Order: Sapindales
- Family: Burseraceae
- Genus: Bursera
- Species: B. tonkinensis

Binomial name
- Bursera tonkinensis Guillaum 1907

Species of flowering plant

Bursera tonkinensis is a species of plant in the Burseraceae family. It is endemic to Vietnam and listed as "vulnerable."
