= Bursera aromatica =

Conservation status
- Vulnerable (IUCN 3.1)

Scientific classification
- Kingdom: Plantae
- Clade: Tracheophytes
- Clade: Angiosperms
- Clade: Eudicots
- Clade: Rosids
- Order: Sapindales
- Family: Burseraceae
- Genus: Bursera
- Species: B. aromatica

Binomial name
- Bursera aromatica Proctor 1967

Species of flowering plant

Bursera aromatica is a species of plant in the Burseraceae family. It is endemic to Jamaica.
