= Bursera lancifolia =

Conservation status
- Least Concern (IUCN 3.1)

Scientific classification
- Kingdom: Plantae
- Clade: Embryophytes
- Clade: Tracheophytes
- Clade: Spermatophytes
- Clade: Angiosperms
- Clade: Eudicots
- Clade: Rosids
- Order: Sapindales
- Family: Burseraceae
- Genus: Bursera
- Species: B. lancifolia

Binomial name
- Bursera lancifolia (Schltdl.) Engl. 1880

Synonyms
- List: Elaphrium lancifolium Schltdl. 1843; Bursera trijuga Ramírez; Elaphrium fragile (S.Watson) Rose; Elaphrium trijugum (Ramírez) Rose; Terebinthus lancifolia W.Wight ex Rose; Terebinthus trijuga (Ramirez) Rose

Species of flowering plant

Bursera lancifolia is a Mexican species of trees in the frankincense family in the soapwood order. It is widespread in western Mexico from Sonora to Oaxaca.

Bursera lancifolia is a small tree. Leaves are pinnately compound with 3-7 leaflets, hairless with small teeth along the edges.
