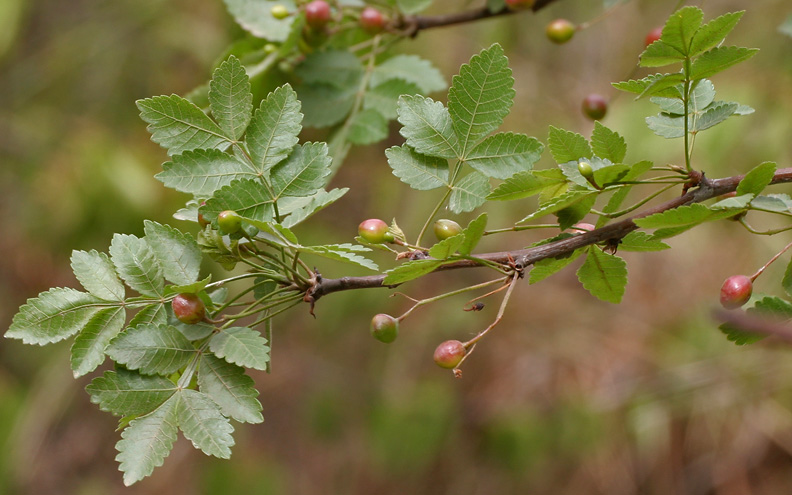

Conservation status
- Least Concern (IUCN 3.1)

Scientific classification
- Kingdom: Plantae
- Clade: Tracheophytes
- Clade: Angiosperms
- Clade: Eudicots
- Clade: Rosids
- Order: Sapindales
- Family: Burseraceae
- Genus: Bursera
- Species: B. penicillata

Binomial name
- Bursera penicillata (Sessé & ex DC.) Engl., 1880

Synonyms
- List: Amyris penicillata Spreng.; Bursera mexicana Engl.; Elaphrium delpechianum (Poiss. ex Engl.) Rose; Elaphrium mexicanum (Engl.) Rose; Elaphrium penicillatum Sessé & Moc. ex DC. 1824; Terebinthus delpechiana (Poiss. ex Engl.) Rose; Terebinthus mexicana (Engl.) W. Wight ex Rose

= Bursera penicillata =

Species of flowering plant

Bursera penicillata is a Mexican species of trees in the frankincense family in the soapwood order. It is widespread in much of Mexico from Sonora and Chihuahua to Oaxaca and Veracruz.

Bursera penicillata is a small tree. Leaves are pinnately compound with 7-9 leaflets.
