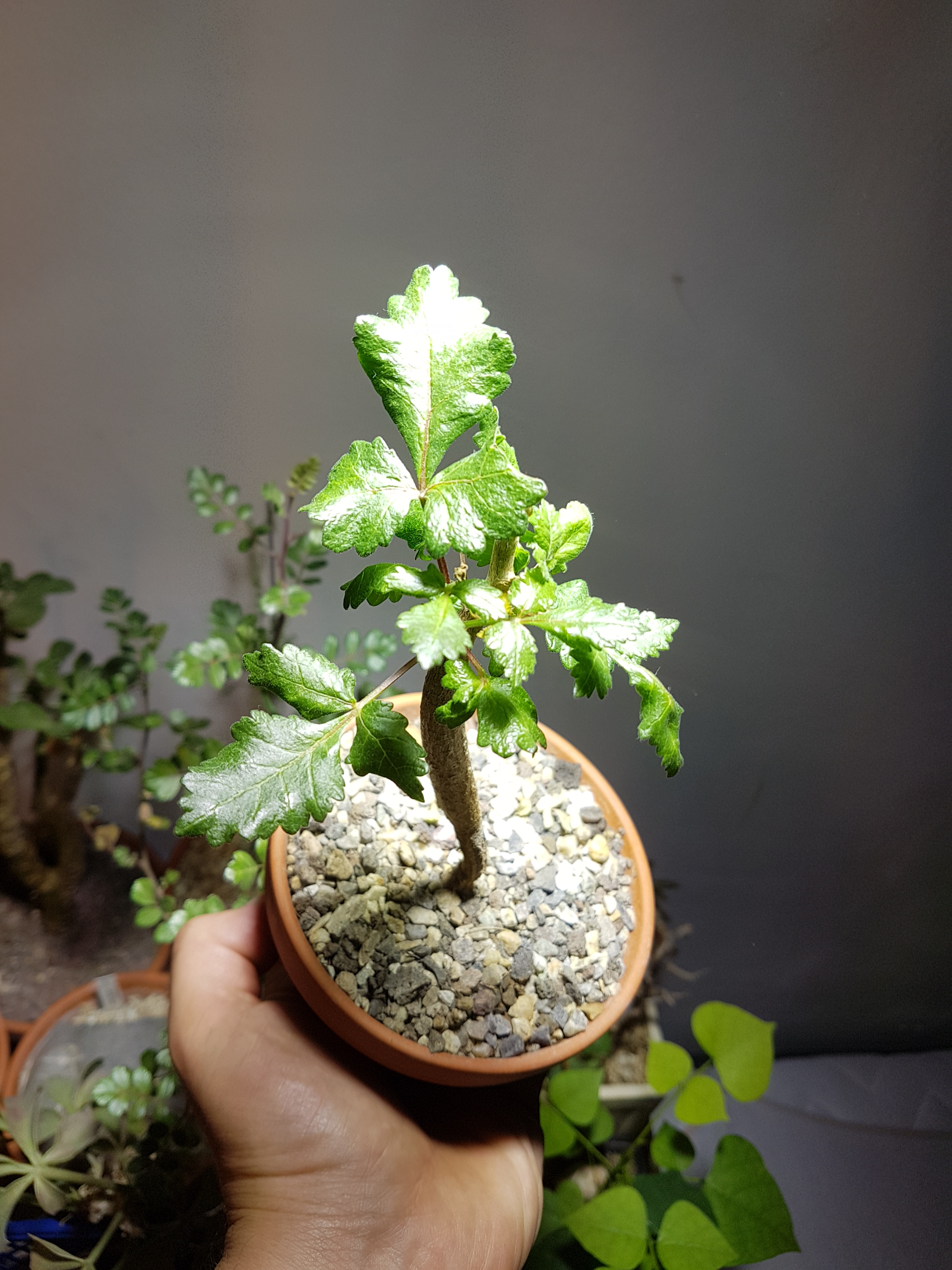

Conservation status
- Least Concern (IUCN 3.1)

Scientific classification
- Kingdom: Plantae
- Clade: Embryophytes
- Clade: Tracheophytes
- Clade: Spermatophytes
- Clade: Angiosperms
- Clade: Eudicots
- Clade: Rosids
- Order: Sapindales
- Family: Burseraceae
- Genus: Bursera
- Species: B. hindsiana

Binomial name
- Bursera hindsiana (Benth.) Engl. 1883 not Brandegee 1891

Synonyms
- List: Elaphrium hindsianum Benth. 1844; Bursera goldmanii (Rose) Engl.; Bursera hindsiana var. rhoifolia (Benth.) Engl.; Bursera macdougalii (Rose) Engl.; Bursera rhoifolia (Benth.) I.M.Johnst.; Elaphrium goldmanii Rose; Elaphrium goldmani Rose; Elaphrium macdougalii (Rose) Rose; Elaphrium rhoifolium Benth.; Terebinthus rhoifolia Rose

= Bursera hindsiana =

Species of flowering plant

Bursera hindsiana, known by the common name red elephant tree is a Mexican tree species in the frankincense family in the soapwood order. It grows in Sonora and in both of the states of Baja California. This includes several of the islands in the Gulf of California.

Bursera hindsiana is a small tree. Bark is brown on the first-year branches, gray on the older stems. Leaves are pinnately compound with 5 or 7 leaflets, rarely more than 3 cm (1.2 in) long, hairy on both sides.
