= Bursera lunanii =

Conservation status
- Near Threatened (IUCN 2.3)

Scientific classification
- Kingdom: Plantae
- Clade: Tracheophytes
- Clade: Angiosperms
- Clade: Eudicots
- Clade: Rosids
- Order: Sapindales
- Family: Burseraceae
- Genus: Bursera
- Species: B. lunanii

Binomial name
- Bursera lunanii (Spreng.) C.D.Adams & Dandy ex Proctor 1982

Synonyms
- Amyris lunanii Spreng. 1825; Bursera simplicifolia DC.; Elaphrium jamaicense Rose; Elaphrium simplicifolium (DC.) Schltdl.; Terebinthus simplicifolia Britton

Species of flowering plant

Bursera lunanii is a species of plant in the family Burseraceae. It is endemic to Jamaica and listed as "near threatened".
