= Bursera cerasifolia =

Scientific classification
- Kingdom: Plantae
- Clade: Tracheophytes
- Clade: Angiosperms
- Clade: Eudicots
- Clade: Rosids
- Order: Sapindales
- Family: Burseraceae
- Genus: Bursera
- Species: B. cerasifolia

Binomial name
- Bursera cerasifolia Brandegee 1891

Synonyms
- Elaphrium cerasifolium (Brandegee) Rose; Elaphrium cerasiifolium (Brandegee) Rose; Bursera cerasiifolia Brandegee

Species of flowering plant

Bursera cerasifolia is an uncommon North American species of trees in the Frankincense Family in the soapwood order. It has been found only in the State of Baja California Sur in northwestern Mexico.

Bursera cerasifolia is a shrub or small tree 4–8 meters tall. Leaves are simple (not compound), 4–6 cm long, usually crowded together at the tips of branches. Drupes are hairless and egg-shaped.
