= Tehuacán Valley matorral =

Xeric shrubland ecoregion in Mexico

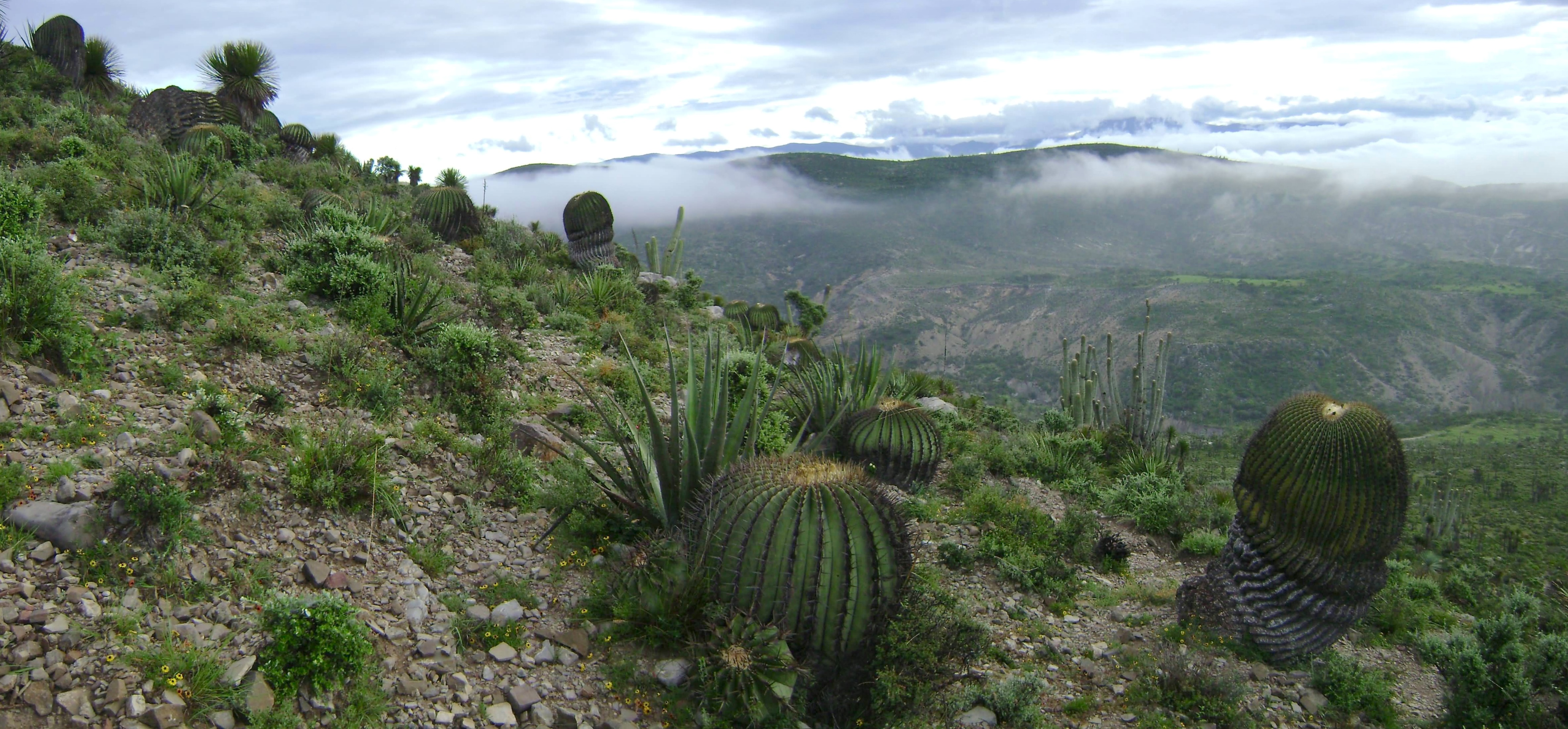
- Landscape near San Antonio Texcala, Puebla, Mexico

- Map of the Tehuacán Valley matorral

Ecology
- Realm: Neotropical
- Biome: deserts and xeric shrublands
- Borders: Balsas dry forests; Sierra Madre de Oaxaca pine-oak forests; Sierra Madre del Sur pine-oak forests; Trans-Mexican Volcanic Belt pine-oak forests

Geography
- Area: 9,842 km^{2} (3,800 mi^{2})
- Country: Mexico
- States: Oaxaca; Puebla; Tlaxcala

Conservation
- Conservation status: Critical/endangered
- Protected: 1,594 km^{2} (16%)

The Tehuacán Valley matorral is a xeric shrubland ecoregion, of the deserts and xeric shrublands biome, located in eastern Central Mexico.

Matorral is a Spanish word, along with tomillares, for shrubland, thicket or bushes. The term is used alone for a Mediterranean climate ecosystem in Southern Europe.

== Geography ==
The Tehuacán Valley matorral ecoregion occupies the Tehuacán Valley, Oriental Basin, and adjacent valleys, covering parts of the states of Tlaxcala, Puebla and Oaxaca. The valleys lie in the rain shadow of the surrounding mountain ranges, and are drier than the surrounding ecoregions.

=== Adjacent ecoregions ===
The Tehuacán Valley matorral is bounded by the Trans-Mexican Volcanic Belt pine-oak forests to the northwest, north, and northeast, the Sierra Madre de Oaxaca pine-oak forests to the east, and by the Balsas dry forests to the southeast, south, and southwest.

== Flora ==
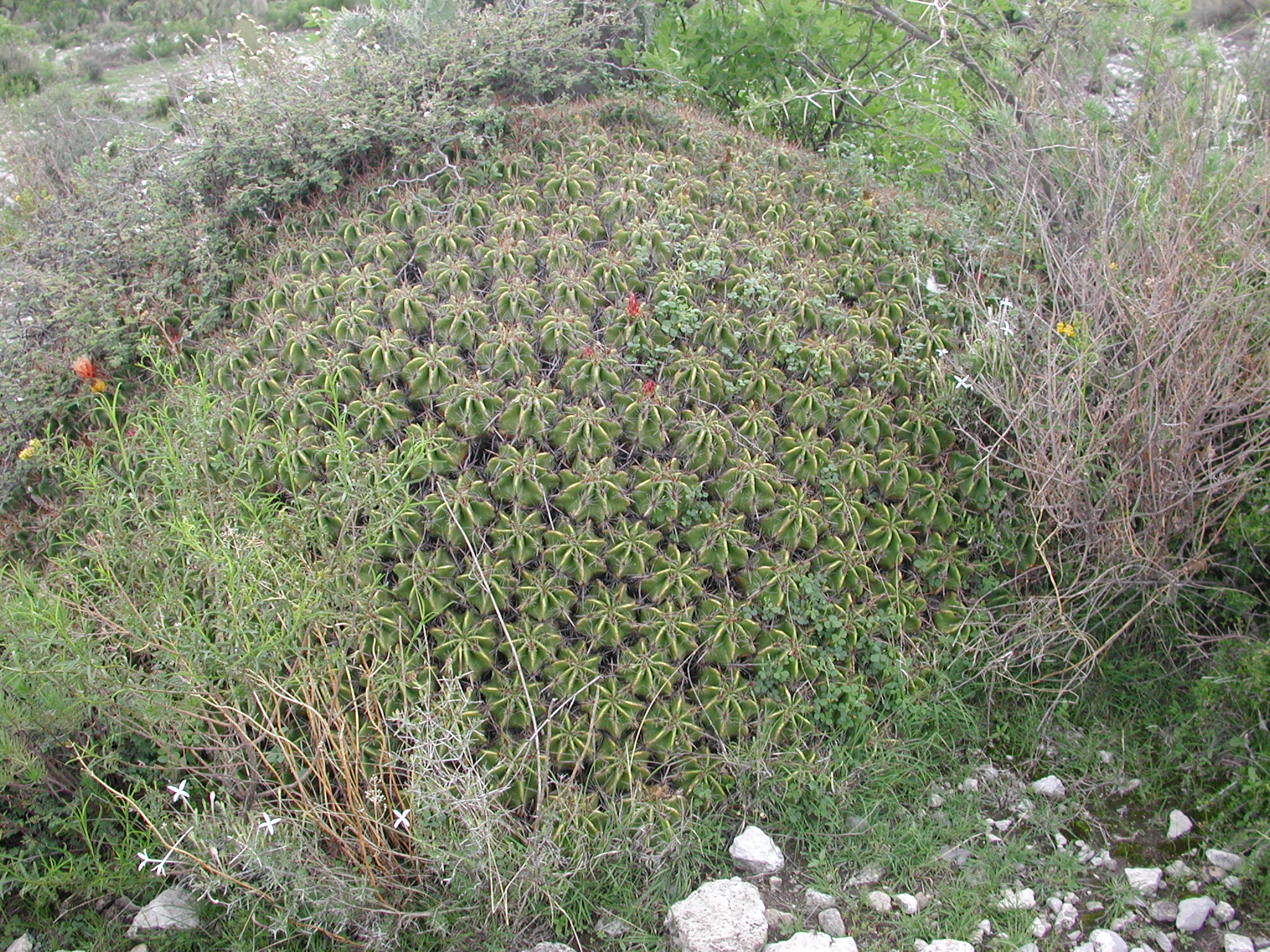
Xeric vegetation in Tehuacán Valley.

The Tehuacán Valley matorral is a center of plant diversity, with over 2700 species, of which approximately 30% are endemic. It is a center of diversity for species of Agave, Hechtia, Salvia, and cactus.

The ecoregion has a number of distinct plant communities.

== Fauna ==
The ecoregion is notable for its diversity of birds and bats. Of the 90 species of birds present, 10 are endemic, including the ocellated thrasher (Toxostoma ocellatum), and bridled sparrow (Aimorphilla mystacalis). 34 species of bats inhabit the ecoregion, of which 18 are endangered, vulnerable, or rare.

== Protected areas ==
A 2017 assessment found that 1,594 km^{2}, or 16%, of the ecoregion is in protected areas. Protected areas include the Tehuacán-Cuicatlán Biosphere Reserve.

== See also ==
- List of ecoregions in Mexico
- Matorral
