= Bursera stenophylla =

Conservation status
- Least Concern (IUCN 3.1)

Scientific classification
- Kingdom: Plantae
- Clade: Embryophytes
- Clade: Tracheophytes
- Clade: Angiosperms
- Clade: Eudicots
- Clade: Rosids
- Order: Sapindales
- Family: Burseraceae
- Genus: Bursera
- Species: B. stenophylla

Binomial name
- Bursera stenophylla Sprague & L.Riley 1923

Synonyms
- Elaphrium stenophyllum (Sprague & Riley) J.G.Ortega

Species of flowering plant

Bursera stenophylla is a Mexican species of trees in the frankincense family in the soapwood order. It has been found in the States of Sonora, Chihuahua, and Sinaloa in northwestern Mexico.

Bursera stenophylla is a small tree. Leaves are bipinnately compound, up to 13 cm (5.1 in) long.
