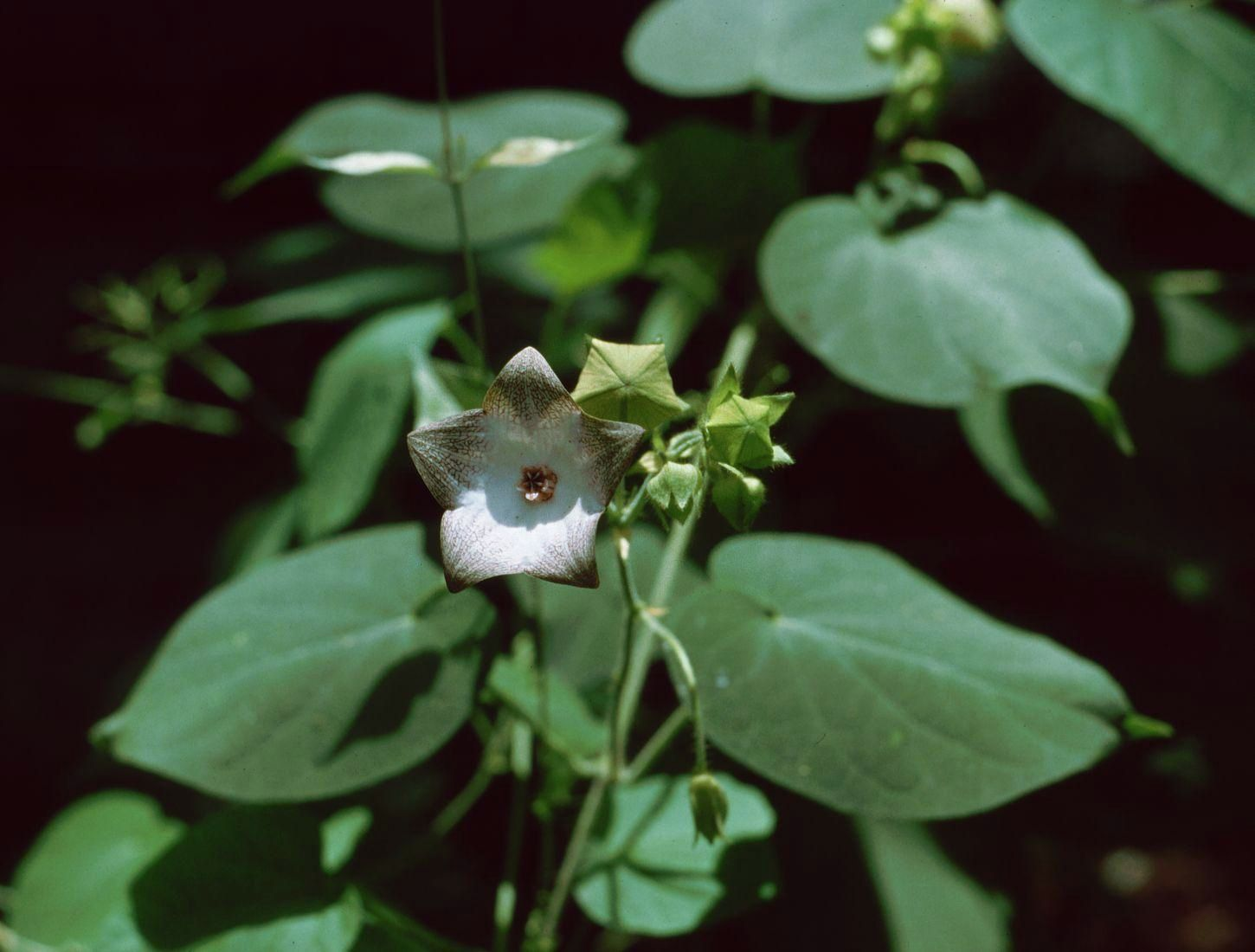
- Polystemma guatemalense

Scientific classification
- Kingdom: Plantae
- Clade: Tracheophytes
- Clade: Angiosperms
- Clade: Eudicots
- Clade: Asterids
- Order: Gentianales
- Family: Apocynaceae
- Subfamily: Asclepiadoideae
- Tribe: Asclepiadeae
- Genus: Polystemma; Decne.

Species
- See text.

= Polystemma =

Genus of plants

Polystemma is a genus of flowering plants of the family Apocynaceae first established as a genus in 1844. It is native to Mexico and Central America.

== Species ==
As of October 2026, Plants of the World Online accepted the following species:

- Polystemma adenocardium (Standl.) L.O.Alvarado & S.Islas
- Polystemma angustilobum (B.L.Rob. & Greenm.) L.O.Alvarado & S.Islas
- Polystemma atreyui Pío-León, L.O.Alvarado & S.Islas
- Polystemma calcicola (Greenm.) Morillo
- Polystemma canisferum McDonnell & Fishbein
- Polystemma cervantesii (Lozada-Pérez & L.O.Alvarado) L.O.Alvarado & S.Islas
- Polystemma cordatum (Brandegee) L.O.Alvarado
- Polystemma cordifolium (A.Gray) McDonnell & Fishbei
- Polystemma fishbeinianum V.W.Steinm. & W.D.Stevens
- Polystemma fruticosum (Brandegee) L.O.Alvarado & S.Islas
- Polystemma fuscum (Decne.) C.Cerv., S.Arias & L.O.Alvarado
- Polystemma galindoi Pío-León, L.O.Alvarado & S.Islas
- Polystemma guatemalense (Schltr.) W.D.Stevens
- Polystemma horconesense C.D.Sánchez, L.O.Alvarado & S.Islas
- Polystemma leopardum L.O.Alvarado, García-Mend., D.Sandoval & Lozada-Pérez
- Polystemma luridum (Decne.) C.Cerv., Flores Olv. & L.O.Alvarado
- Polystemma magallanesii (E.J.Lott) Morillo
- Polystemma mirandae Lozada-Pérez
- Polystemma petiolare (A.Gray) L.O.Alvarado & S.Islas
- Polystemma pilosum (Benth.) Morillo
- Polystemma pueblense (Brandegee) L.O.Alvarado & S.Islas
- Polystemma purpusii (Brandegee) L.O.Alvarado & S.Islas
- Polystemma quercetorum (Standl.) Morillo
- Polystemma stevensii G.M.Hern.-Barón, Trujillo-Juárez & V.W.Steinm.
- Polystemma tristiflorum (Standl.) L.O.Alvarado & S.Islas
- Polystemma umbellatum (Brandegee) L.O.Alvarado & S.Islas
- Polystemma viridiflorum Decne.
