= Bursera filicifolia =

Conservation status
- Vulnerable (IUCN 3.1)

Scientific classification
- Kingdom: Plantae
- Clade: Embryophytes
- Clade: Tracheophytes
- Clade: Spermatophytes
- Clade: Angiosperms
- Clade: Eudicots
- Clade: Rosids
- Order: Sapindales
- Family: Burseraceae
- Genus: Bursera
- Species: B. filicifolia

Binomial name
- Bursera filicifolia Brandegee 1908

Synonyms
- Bursera laxiflora subsp. filicifolia (Brandegee) Felger & C.H.Lowe; Bursera laxiflora var. filicifolia (Brandegee) Felger & Lowe; Elaphrium filicifolium (Brandegee) Rose

Species of flowering plant

Bursera filicifolia is an uncommon North American species of trees in the Frankincense Family in the soapwood order. It has been found only in the States of Sonora and Baja California Sur in northwestern Mexico.

Bursera filicifolia is a shrub or small tree with gray bark unlike the red bark of the closely related B. laxiflora. Leaves are pinnately compound with 9-19 leaflets, hairy on both sides. Drupes are hairless and egg-shaped.
