= Bursera laxiflora =

Conservation status
- Near Threatened (IUCN 3.1)

Scientific classification
- Kingdom: Plantae
- Clade: Embryophytes
- Clade: Tracheophytes
- Clade: Spermatophytes
- Clade: Angiosperms
- Clade: Eudicots
- Clade: Rosids
- Order: Sapindales
- Family: Burseraceae
- Genus: Bursera
- Species: B. laxiflora

Binomial name
- Bursera laxiflora S. Watson 1889 not Kuntze 1891

Synonyms
- Bursera concinna Sandwith; Elaphrium concinnum (Sandwith) J.G.Ortega; Elaphrium laxiflorum (S.Watson) Rose; Terebinthus laxiflora (S. Watson) Rose

Species of flowering plant

Bursera laxiflora is a North American species of trees in the frankincense family in the soapwood order, native to northwestern Mexico. It is fairly common in Sonora (including Tiburón Island) with additional populations in Sinaloa, Baja California Sur, and Socorro Island. There is a report of the species being found in the United States, but it is from the property of the Arizona-Sonora Desert Museum west of Tucson, most likely a cultivated or escaped specimen.

Bursera laxiflora is a small tree with red bark unlike the gray bark of the closely related B. filicifolia. The trunk can reach a diameter of up to 30 centimetres (12 in). Leaves are pinnately compound with 5-9 leaflets, with short hairs on both sides. Drupes are egg-shaped and somewhat flattened.
