= Bursera grandifolia =

Conservation status
- Least Concern (IUCN 3.1)

Scientific classification
- Kingdom: Plantae
- Clade: Tracheophytes
- Clade: Angiosperms
- Clade: Eudicots
- Clade: Rosids
- Order: Sapindales
- Family: Burseraceae
- Genus: Bursera
- Species: B. grandifolia

Binomial name
- Bursera grandifolia (Schltdl.) Engl. 1880

Synonyms
- List: Elaphrium grandifolium Schltdl. 1843; Bursera grandifolia forma robusta Bullock; Bursera occidentalis (Rose) L.Riley; Elaphrium cinereum (Engl.) Rose; Elaphrium occidentale Rose; Terebinthus grandifolia (Schltdl.) Rose

Species of flowering plant

Bursera grandifolia is a Mexican species of trees in the frankincense family in the soapwood order. It is widespread across much of Mexico from Sonora to the Yucatán Peninsula, and found also in Central America as far south as Costa Rica.

Bursera grandifolia has leaves that are pinnately compound with 5 leaflets, each leaflet egg-shaped and 5–7 cm long, hairy on the underside but not on the topside. Drupes are egg-shaped with a few scattered hairs.
