= Sierra Madre de Oaxaca pine–oak forests =

Tropical coniferous forest ecoregion in Mexico

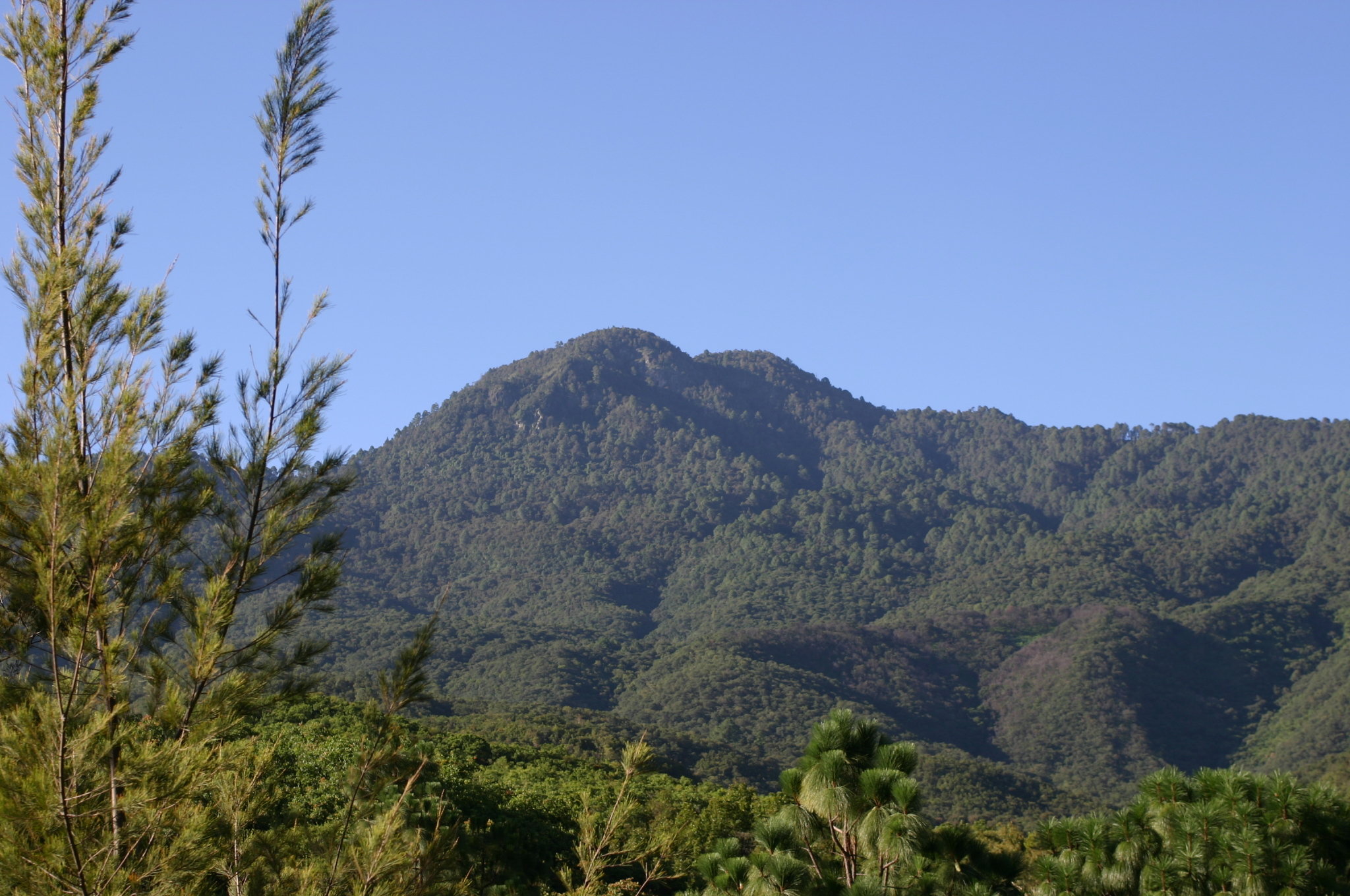
- Cerro San Felipe, located in Benito Juárez National Park, is important as the water source for the city of Oaxaca

- Location of the Sierra Madre de Oaxaca pine–oak forests ecoregion

Ecology
- Realm: Neotropical
- Biome: tropical and subtropical coniferous forests
- Borders: List: Tehuacán Valley matorral; Trans-Mexican Volcanic Belt pine–oak forests; Oaxacan montane forests; Petén–Veracruz moist forests; Southern Pacific dry forests; Sierra Madre del Sur pine–oak forests; Balsas dry forests
- Bird species: 447
- Mammal species: 176

Geography
- Area: 14,300 km^{2} (5,500 sq mi)
- Country: Mexico

Conservation
- Conservation status: Critical/endangered
- Habitat loss: 15.078%
- Protected: 6.43%

The Sierra Madre de Oaxaca pine–oak forests is a tropical and subtropical coniferous forests ecoregion in Southern Mexico.

It occupies the Sierra Madre de Oaxaca, a mountain range which lies mostly within the state of Oaxaca, and extends north into Puebla and Veracruz states. It is one of a chain of pine–oak forest ecoregions extending along the American Cordillera from Oregon and California in the north to Nicaragua in the south.

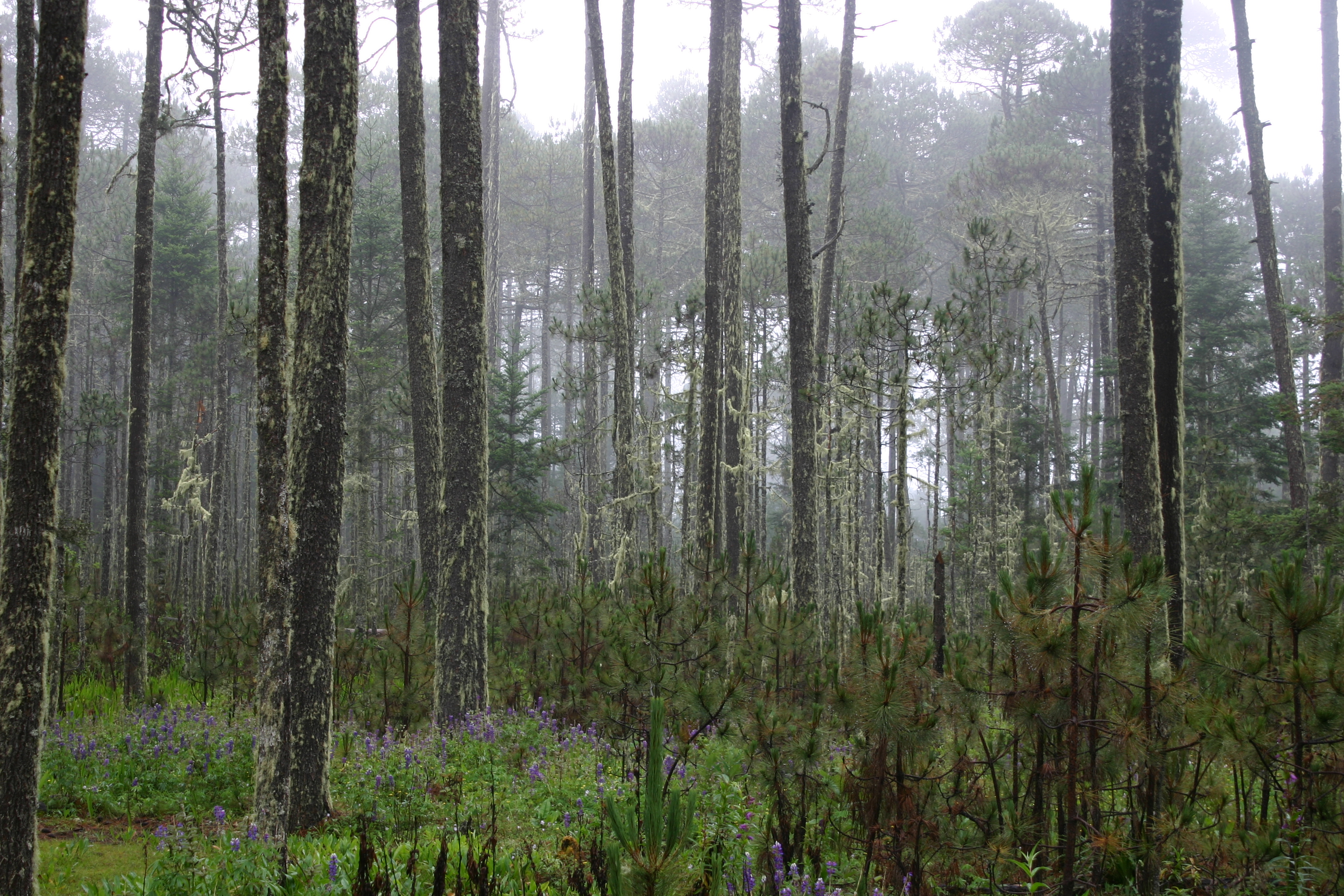
Pine Forest between San Isidro Llano Grande and San Miguel Cajonos, in the Sierra Madre de Oaxaca.

== Geography ==
The ecoregion covers an area of 14,300 square kilometers (5,500 sq mi), lying above 1,600 metres (5,200 ft) elevation. The Sierra Madre de Oaxaca runs northeast-southwest, extending 300 kilometres (190 mi) from Pico de Orizaba in the northeast to the Isthmus of Tehuantepec in the southeast. Peaks in the Sierra Madre de Oaxaca average 2,500 metres (8,200 ft) meters in elevation, with some peaks exceeding 3,000 metres (9,800 ft). The range intercepts humid air moving west from the Gulf of Mexico.

=== Adjacent ecoregions ===
The Gulf Coastal Plain lies to the east, and a series of river valleys separate the Sierra Madre de Oaxaca from the Sierra Madre del Sur to the southwest and the Trans-Mexican Volcanic Belt to the northwest. The ecoregion is bounded on the east by the humid Oaxacan montane forests, which lie below 1,600 metres (5,200 ft) elevation. To the east, the xeric Tehuacán Valley matorral occupies the Tehuacán valley to the northwest, the Jalisco dry forests occupy the upper basin of the Santo Domingo River, which lies in the rain shadow of the Sierra, and the Southern Pacific dry forests lie to the south along the Pacific coast, extending into the upper basin of the Tehuantepec River and the Valley of Oaxaca. The dry forests separate the Sierra Madre de Oaxaca pine–oak forests from the Sierra Madre del Sur pine–oak forests to the southwest.

== Flora ==
The associated vegetation of the pine–oak forests varies with elevation and exposure. Besides the pines (Pinus spp.) and oaks (Quercus spp.) trees, the forests can have a great diversity of bromeliads, orchids, ferns.

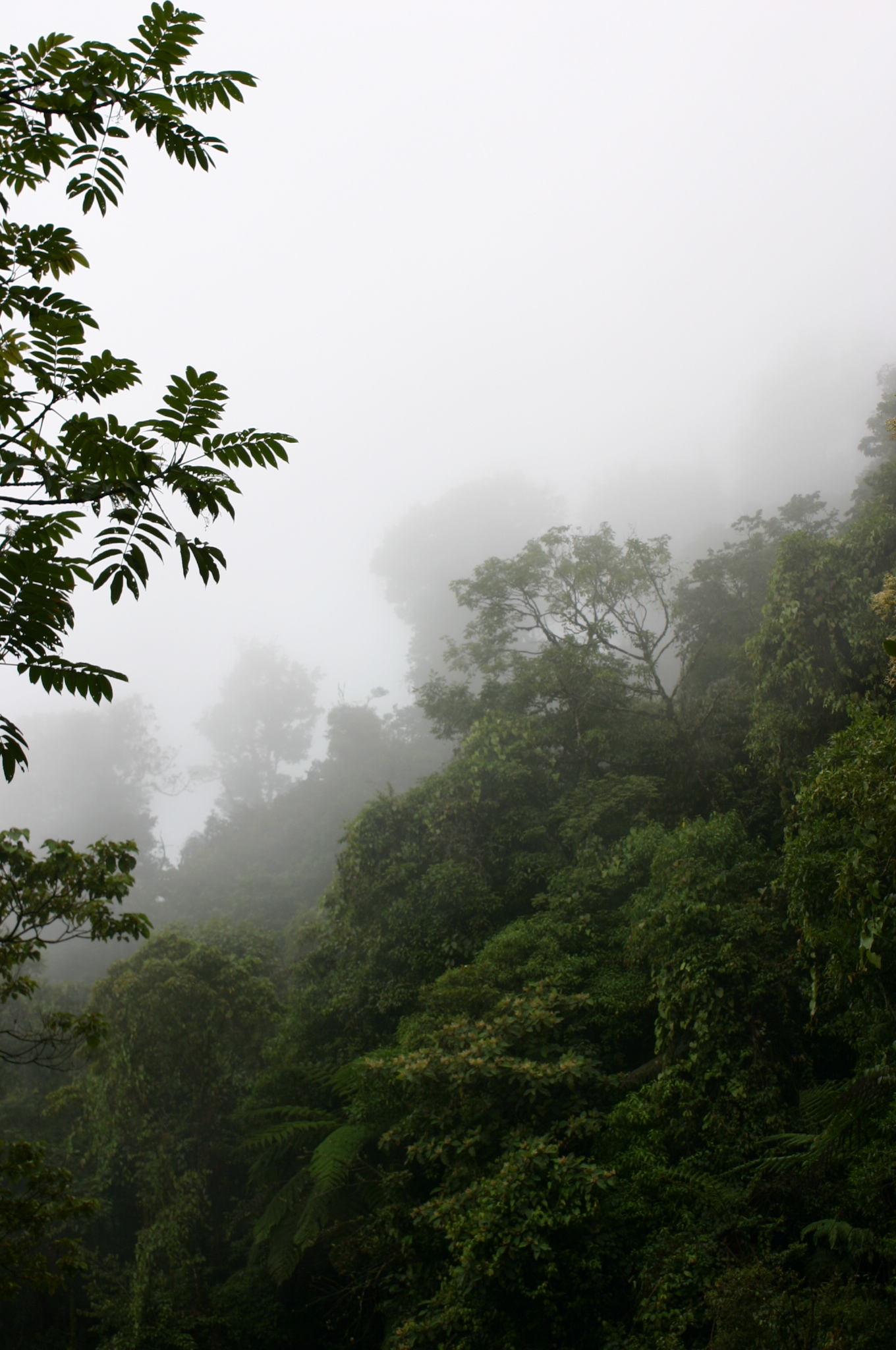
The communal land of the Chinantec Community of Santiago Comaltepec contains cloud forest.

== Fauna ==
The forests of the Sierra Madre de Oaxaca are one of the last remaining habitats with jaguar and puma in Mexico.

== People ==
The pine–oak forests of the Sierra Madre de Oaxaca have been inhabited for a millennium by indigenous cultures. The primary cultures are of the Mazatec, Zapotec, Mixe, Cuicatec, and Chinantec peoples.

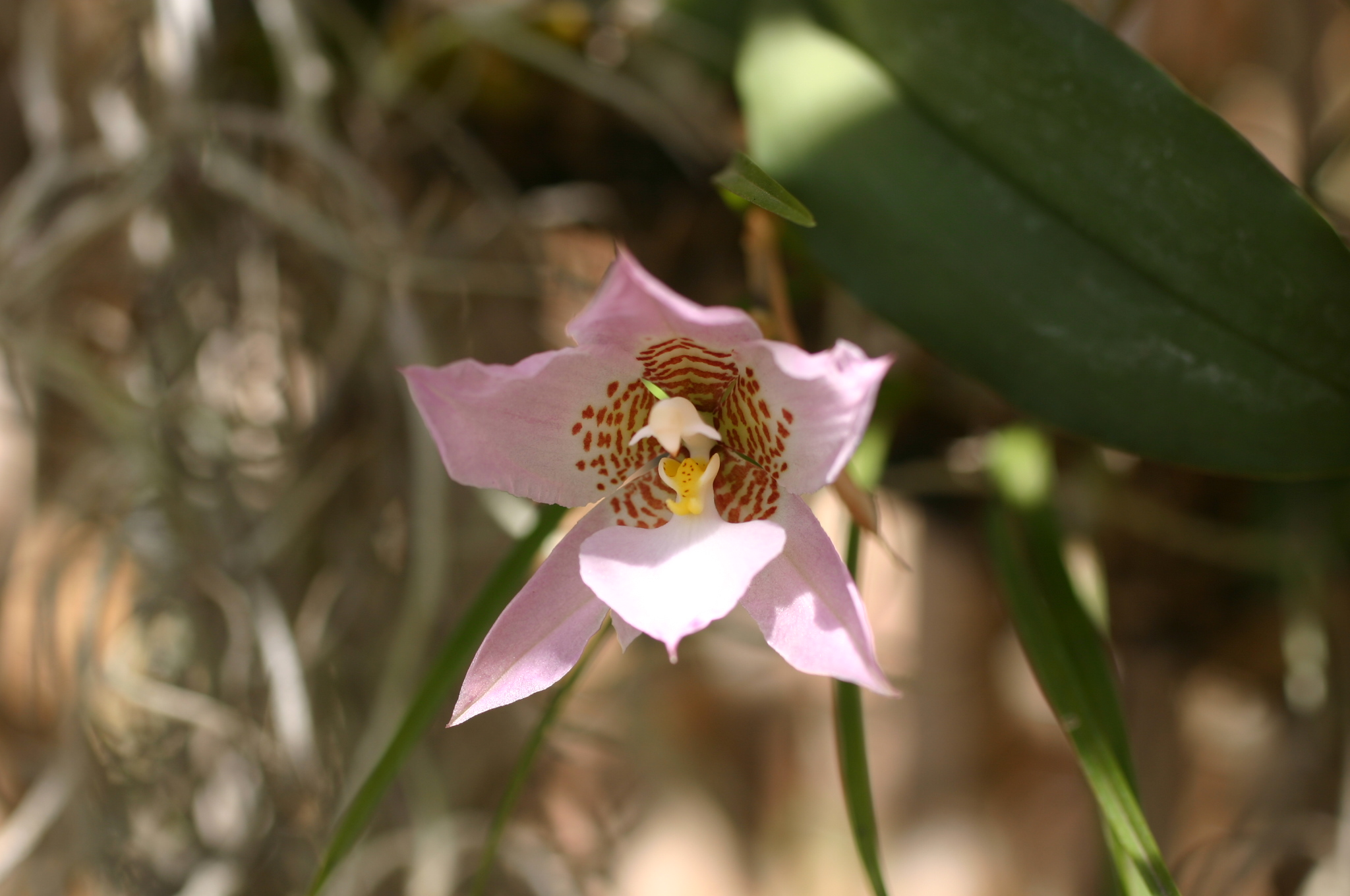
Rhynchostele cervantesii ssp. membranacea is one of the many orchids that inhabit the high forests of the Sierra Madre de Oaxaca.

== Conservation and threats ==
Some of the Sierra Madre de Oaxaca pine–oak forest habitats/areas are among the better conserved forests in Mexico. However, only a small fraction its virgin/old growth forests are protected by the Federal government, within Benito Juárez National Park (Parque Nacional Benito Juárez) located north of Oaxaca city.

Most conservation in the Sierra Madre de Oaxaca is controlled by indigenous communities. For example, Santiago Comaltepec's vast expanse of cloud forests is considered some of the best conserved cloud forests in the world. Many communities, notably Ixtlán de Juárez and the Pueblos Mancomunados, among others, strive to conserve their forest through projects including sustainable forestry and selective logging, ecotourism, education projects, and the prohibition of private property within their communities (thus hampering unsustainable development and industry by foreign or outside agents).

The forests are under threat by foreign investment, and by mining and logging commissions to foreign companies from the Oaxaca state government.

== Protected areas ==
6.43% of the ecoregion is in protected areas. Protected areas include Benito Juárez National Park, Cañón del Río Blanco National Park, Tehuacán-Cuicatlán Biosphere Reserve, Hierve El Agua State Park, and the El Bejucal y la Chichihua, La Cruz – Corral de Piedra, La Tierra del Faisán, Comunitaria Santo Domingo Cacalotepec, (Parcela) 70 Z-1 P1-1 (Ejido Chivela), and Nopalera del Rosario voluntary conservation areas.

== See also ==
- Conifers of Mexico
- List of ecoregions in Mexico
- Sierra Madre de Oaxaca topics
- Trees of Southern Mexico
