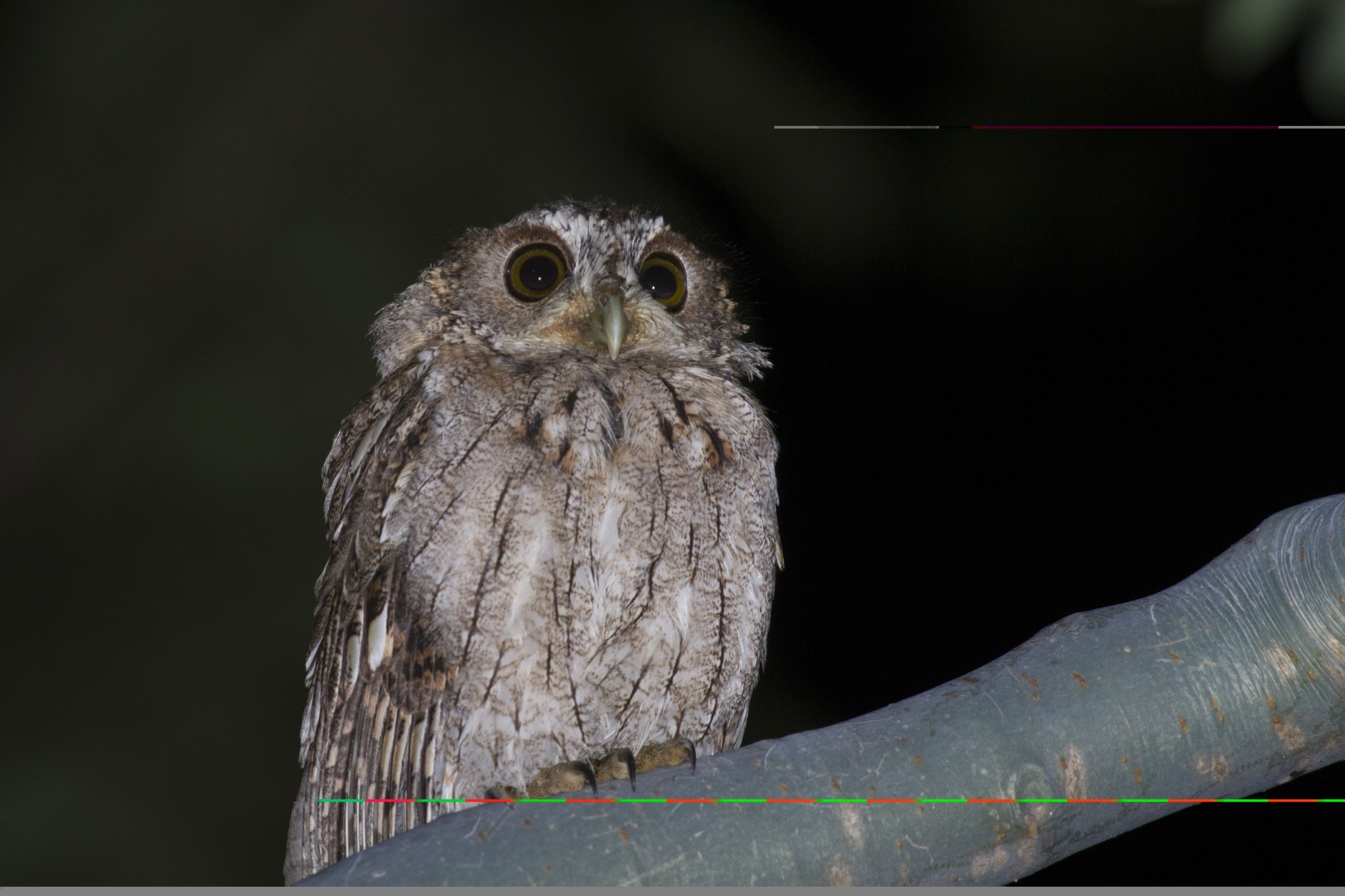

Conservation status
- Least Concern (IUCN 3.1)
- CITES Appendix II (CITES)

Scientific classification
- Kingdom: Animalia
- Phylum: Chordata
- Class: Aves
- Order: Strigiformes
- Family: Strigidae
- Genus: Megascops
- Species: M. seductus

Binomial name
- Megascops seductus (Moore, RT, 1941)

Synonyms
- Otus seductus R. T. Moore, 1941

= Balsas screech owl =

Species of owl

The Balsas screech owl (Megascops seductus) is a species of owl in the family Strigidae. It is endemic to Mexico.

== Taxonomy and systematics ==
The Balsas screech owl is monotypic.

== Description ==
The Balsas screech owl is among the larger members of genus Megascops; it is 24 to 27 cm (9.4 to 10.6 in) long and weighs between 150 and 174 g (5.3 and 6.1 oz). Its facial disc is grayish brown with brownish markings and a darker border. Its "ear" tufts are short. The crown and upperparts are also grayish brown; the crown has darker streaks and the upperparts have a pinkish blush and dark streaks and other marks. The closed wing shows two bands of whitish spots. The underparts are paler than the upperparts and have narrow dark streaks and faint vermiculation.

== Distribution and habitat ==
The Balsas screech owl is endemic to interior southwestern Mexico. Its range is centered on the valley of the Balsas River from southern Jalisco southeast into central Guerrero. It inhabits arid open and semi-open areas such as deciduous woodland with cactus, thorn forest, and secondary forest. It can also be found in tropical scrublands and the edges of cultivated areas. In elevation it ranges from 600 to 1,500 m (2,000 to 4,900 ft).

== Behavior ==
=== Feeding ===
Like most other screech owls, the Basas screech owl is nocturnal. Its hunting methods have not been described, but its diet apparently includes insects, other arthropods, and small vertebrates.

=== Breeding ===
Very little is known about the Balsas screech owl's breeding phenology. It is assumed to nest in cavities in trees and cacti like others of its genus.

=== Vocalization ===
Both sexes of the Balsas screech owl perform a territorial song described as "a rather loud series of gruff notes accelerating to a trill ('bouncing-ball' rhythm), book-book-bokbokbobobobrrrrr". A possible courtship song is "a series of gruff, screaming 'whinny' trills".

== Status ==
The IUCN has assessed the Balsas screech owl as being of Least Concern. Until 2014 it had been considered Near Threatened. However, its population is unknown and is suspected to be in decline due to habitat loss and degradation.
