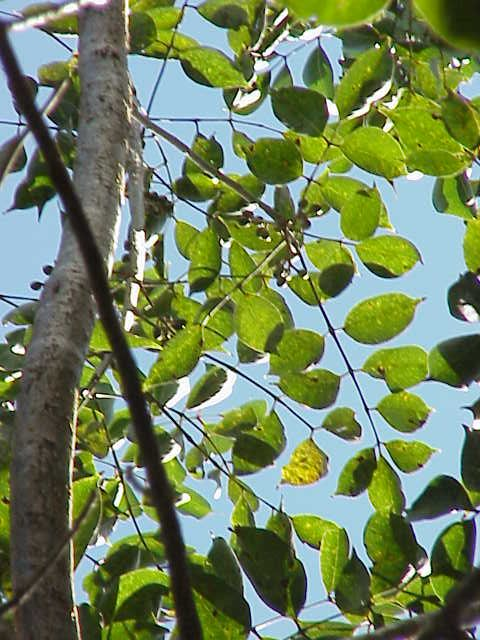
- Bursera simaruba

Scientific classification
- Kingdom: Plantae
- Clade: Tracheophytes
- Clade: Angiosperms
- Clade: Eudicots
- Clade: Rosids
- Order: Sapindales
- Family: Burseraceae
- Genus: Bursera; Jacq. ex L.

Type species
- Bursera simaruba (L.) Sarg.

Species
- About 100, see text.

Synonyms
- Elaphrium Jacq.

= Bursera =

Genus of flowering plants

Bursera is a genus with about 100 described species of flowering shrubs and trees varying in size up to 25 m (82 ft) high. It is the type genus for Burseraceae. The trees are native (often for many species endemic) to the Americas, from the southern United States south through to northern Argentina, in tropical and warm temperate forest habitats. It is named after the 17th-century Danish botanist Joachim Burser.

Several Mexican species (such as B. aloexylon and B. delpechiana) produce a type of wood known as linaloe (from Mexican Spanish lináloe, from Latin lignum aloes, lit. 'wood of the aloe' or 'aloeswood'). They contain the aromatic oil linalool.

A number of species from tropical Asia were once included in this genus, but are now treated in the genus Protium.

== Species ==
- Bursera aloexylon (Schiede ex Schltdl.) Engl.
- Bursera arida
- Bursera aptera
- Bursera aromatica Proctor
- Bursera atenuata
- Bursera aspleniifolia
- Bursera bicolor
- Bursera biflora
- Bursera bipinnata
- Bursera bolivarii
- Bursera bonetti
- Bursera cerasifolia
- Bursera chemapodicta
- Bursera cinera
- Bursera citronella
- Bursera compacta
- Bursera copallifera
- Bursera coyucensis
- Bursera crenata
- Bursera cuneata
- Bursera denticulata
- Bursera discolor
- Bursera diversifolia
- Bursera epinnata
- Bursera excelsa (Kunth) Engl.
- Bursera fagaroides (Kunth) Engl.
- Bursera filicifolia
- Bursera fragantissima
- Bursera fragilis
- Bursera galeottiana Engl.
- Bursera glabrifolia (Kunth) Engl.
- Bursera grandifolia
- Bursera graveolens (Kunth) Triana & Planch. (Palo Santo)
- Bursera heliae
- Bursera heteresthes
- Bursera hindsiana
- Bursera hintonii
- Bursera hollickii (Britton) F. & R.
- Bursera infiernidialis
- Bursera instabilis
- Bursera isthmica
- Bursera kerberii
- Bursera krusei
- Bursera lancifolia
- Bursera laurihuertae
- Bursera laxiflora
- Bursera leptophloeos Engl.
- Bursera linanoe (La Llave) Rzed., Calderón & Medina(=Bursera delpechiana Poiss. ex Engl. )
- Bursera longipes
- Bursera lunanii (Spreng) Adams & Dandy
- Bursera macvaughiana
- Bursera malacophylla B.L.Rob.
- Bursera medranoana
- Bursera microphylla A.Gray – Elephant tree
- Bursera mirandae
- Bursera morelensis
- Bursera multifolia
- Bursera multijuga
- Bursera nesopola
- Bursera occulta
- Bursera palaciosii
- Bursera palmeri
- Bursera penicillata (DC.) Engl.
- Bursera ribana
- Bursera ruticola
- Bursera rzedowski
- Bursera sarcopoda
- Bursera sarukhanii
- Bursera schlechtendalii Engl.
- Bursera simaruba (L.) Sarg. – Gumbo-limbo
- Bursera staphyleoides
- Bursera stenophylla
- Bursera submoniliformis
- Bursera suntui
- Bursera tecomaca
- Bursera tomentosa
- Bursera tonkinensis Guillaum.
- Bursera trifoliolata
- Bursera trimera
- Bursera vasquezyanesii
- Bursera vejar-vazquezii
- Bursera velutina
- Bursera xochipalensis

list sources :

=== Formerly placed here ===
- Canarium paniculatum (Lam.) Benth. ex Engl. (as B. paniculata Lam.)
- Protium serratum (Wall. ex Colebr.) Engl. (as B. serrata Wall. ex Colebr.)

== Uses ==
- Caranna, medicinal gum

== Gallery ==
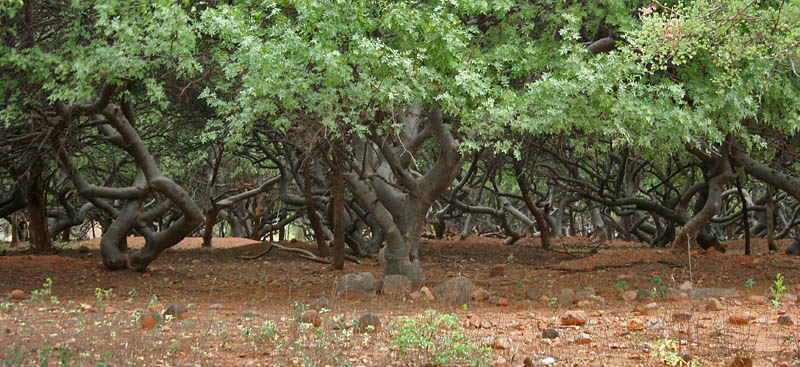
Bursera penicillata trunks

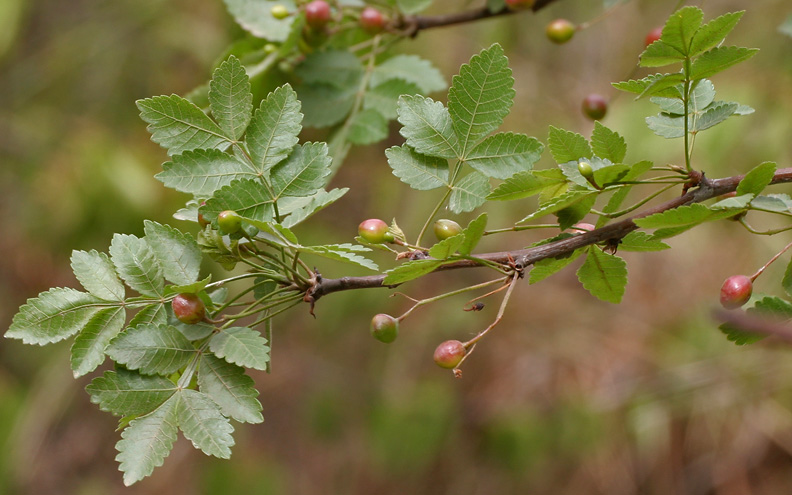
Bursera penicillata fruits and leaves

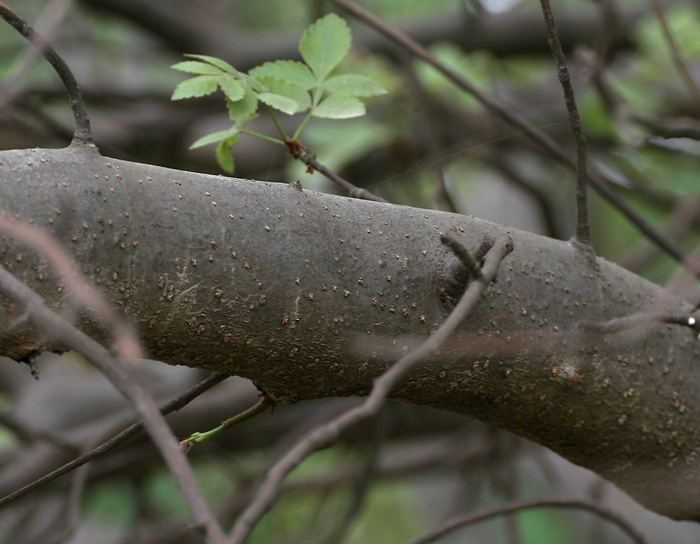
Bursera penicillata trunk
