= Sierra Madre del Sur pine–oak forests =

Tropical coniferous forest ecoregion in Mexico

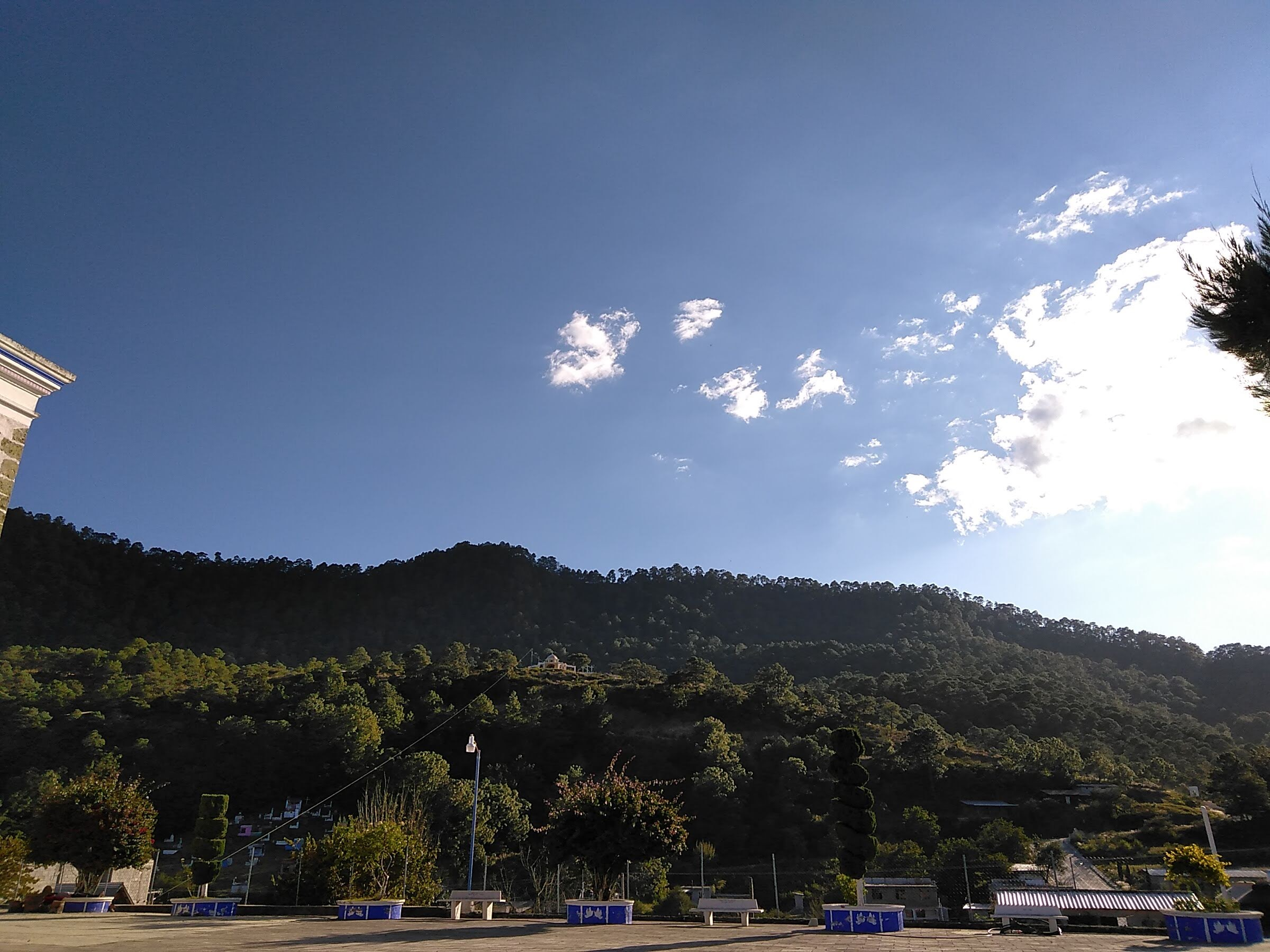
- Near Tlaxiaco, Oaxaca, Mexico

- Location of the Sierra Madre del Sur pine–oak forests

Ecology
- Realm: Neotropical
- Biome: tropical and subtropical coniferous forests
- Borders: Balsas dry forests; Tehuacan Valley matorral; Sierra Madre de Oaxaca pine–oak forests; Southern Pacific dry forests
- Bird species: 330
- Mammal species: 151

Geography
- Area: 61,200 km^{2} (23,600 mi^{2})
- Country: Mexico

Conservation
- Habitat loss: 10.689%
- Protected: 2.9%

The Sierra Madre del Sur pine–oak forests is a subtropical coniferous forest ecoregion in the Sierra Madre del Sur mountain range of southern Mexico.

== Setting ==
The Sierra Madre del Sur pine–oak forests occupy an area of 61,200 square kilometers (23,600 sq mi), within the states of Michoacán, Guerrero, and Oaxaca.

The pine–oak forests occupy the higher slopes of the Sierra Madre del Sur range, which runs east and west parallel to Mexico's southern Pacific Coast. The forests are surrounded by tropical dry forests at lower elevations; the Jalisco dry forests to the west; the Balsas dry forests to the north, in the basin of the Balsas River, and the Southern Pacific dry forests to the south and east along the Pacific coast.

== Flora ==
The chief plant communities are oak forests, cloud forests, pine–oak forests, and fir forests. The plant communities vary with elevation and rainfall.

The oak forests occur between 1900 and 2500 metres elevation (6,200-8,200 feet). Quercus magnoliifolia and Quercus castanea are the predominant tree species, with individuals of Pinus montezumae. Orchids and bromeliads grow as epiphytes.

Cloud forests grow at 2300 metres (7,500 feet). Predominant tree species are Abies guatemalensis, Abies religiosa, Quercus uxoris, Pinus ayacahuite, and Cupressus lusitanica.

Pine–oak forests grow at 2400–2500 metres (7,900-8,200 feet). Predominant tree species are Quercus magnoliifolia, Q. castanea, Q. obtusata, Pinus herrerae, P. pseudostrobus, P. pringlei, P. ayacahuite, P. rzedowskii, and Arbutus xalapensis.

Fir forests grow above 3,000 metres (9,800 feet).

31 species of oaks are native to the ecoregion, including Q. mulleri, Q. nixoniana, Q. rubramenta, Q. salicifolia, Q. uxoris, and Q. martinezii.

The trees Aiouea cinnamomoidea, Magnolia guerrerensis, Magnolia krusei, Magnolia vazquezii, Quercus mulleri, Quercus obtusanthera, and Quercus salasiae are endemic to the ecoregion.

== Fauna ==
There are 160 native species of birds in the ecoregion, of which 28 are endemic to the Sierra Madre del Sur. Endemic birds include the short-crested coquette (Lophornis brachylophus), white-tailed hummingbird (Eupherusa poliocerca), Oaxaca hummingbird (Eupherusa cyanophrys) and white-throated jay or Omiltemi jay (Cyanolyca mirabilis). Other native birds include the amethyst-throated hummingbird (Lampornis amethystinus), Steller's jay (Cyanocitta stelleri), ruddy foliage-gleaner (Clibanornis rubiginosus), russet nightingale-thrush (Catharus occidentalis), and collared towhee (Pipilo ocai).

== Protected areas ==
2.9% of the ecoregion is in protected areas. Protected areas in the ecoregion include the Zicuirán-Infiernillo and Tehuacán-Cuicatlán biosphere reserves, General Juan Álvarez National Park, Boquerón de Tonalá Flora and Fauna Protection Area, Omiltemi Ecological State Park, and the Campo Verde, Iliatenco, Cafetal San Juanito (Pluma Hidalgo), Cafetal Soconusco, Cerro Azul, Concepción Vista Hermosa, El Corozal, and El Borbollón, La Pandura y La Yerbabuena voluntary conservation areas.

== See also ==
- List of ecoregions in Mexico
- Conifers of Mexico
