= Pinus georginae =

- Foliage and cone, Jalisco

Scientific classification
- Kingdom: Plantae
- Clade: Tracheophytes
- Clade: Gymnosperms
- Division: Pinophyta
- Class: Pinopsida
- Order: Pinales
- Family: Pinaceae
- Genus: Pinus
- Subgenus: P. subg. Pinus
- Section: P. sect. Trifoliae
- Subsection: P. subsect. Australes
- Species: P. georginae

Binomial name
- Pinus georginae Pérez de la Rosa (2009)

Species of conifer

Pinus georginae, known (in Spanish) as Pino chino, is a species of small to medium-sized pine in the family Pinaceae. It was first described by Pérez de la Rosa in 2009, and was named after Georgina Vargas Amado, who was with Pérez de la Rosa at the time of the tree's collection and description.

== Description ==
Pinus georginae on average reaches 15–20 metres (49–66 ft) tall, and 30–35 cm (12–14 in) trunk diameter, with a crooked trunk and a low-lying, thick, generally rounded crown. The bark is in pale to dark grey rectangular plates, with twigs at 4–6 mm (0.16–0.24 in) thick. The leaves are needle-like, produced in fascicles of 3–5, and are 15–17 cm (5.9–6.7 in) long. The cones are very similar to those of Pinus praetermissa, produced on curved peduncles 16–20 mm (0.63–0.79 in) long and 4–5 mm (0.16–0.20 in) thick. The cones are globose with a pointed apex, 6–8 cm (2.4–3.1 in) long and 6–7 cm (2.4–2.8 in) diameter, with 75-85 seed scales per cone; after opening, they fall with part of the peduncle still attached. The bark flakes easily. Pollination occurs in June and July; cone maturation takes up to two years. Seed dispersal is throughout March and April. The seeds are 6.5–7.3 mm (0.26–0.29 in) long, and germinate after some of the first rains in June.

== Taxonomy ==
It is classified in the subsection Pinus subsect. Australes. It is very similar to P. praetermissa and is closely related to it; it may be of hybrid origin between P. praetermissa and P. leiophylla.

== Distribution and ecology ==
Pinus georginae is found throughout parts of west-central Jalisco, Mexico, at the convergence of the Sierra Madre Occidental, Trans-Mexican Volcanic Belt, Sierra Madre del Sur, and the Mexican Altiplano (Mexican Plateau).

It grows exclusively in the Subtropical Biome, which is the same for many other Mexican endemic pines.

Primarily, the species is known to grow throughout the towns of Atenguillo, Cuautla, and Mascota, at altitudes of 1,400–1,700 m (4,600–5,600 ft) in intermountain valleys, specifically south of the Rio Ameca river basin, with scattered individuals and some spread out stands.

The general area where Pinus georginae occurs in Jalisco averages 932 mm (36.7 in) of rain every year, with dry-temperate seasons of 21.6 °C (70.9 °F).

The species population occurs in pine-oak forests found near and within close proximities of natural grasslands. It is found growing with other species of pine, such as Pinus gordoniana, Pinus devoniana, Pinus oocarpa, Pinus lumholtzii, and Pinus luzmariae.

It is also seen growing beside two species of oak, Quercus resinosa and Quercus obtusata.

Pinus georginae, besides Pinus praetermissa, is also closely related to Pinus luzmariae, a sympatric pine species that likely diverged from Pinus georginae during the Early Pleistocene Period.

The species is often parasitized by Cladocolea cupulata, a species of parasitic mistletoe.

== Classification and conservation ==
Pinus georginae was originally included under Pinus praetermissa (which it closely resembles), but was later assigned to a new taxon, as basic genetic analysis experiments showed that Pinus georginae is a distinct species.

No conservation status has been established for Pinus georginae yet, and is currently listed as "Not Evaluated" by many sources, although deforestation and wildfires may be common threats to its range.

== Uses ==
Lumber from Pinus georginae is of a low quality, and can easily break because of the species' low trunk, hence lumber production is very limited. The species is extremely resinous though, producing large amounts of resin, which is harvested by locals in small quantities and sold at local markets. Brush from the tree could be used as a fire starter, but that generally isn't likely because of the species rarity and scarceness throughout the region and its range.
