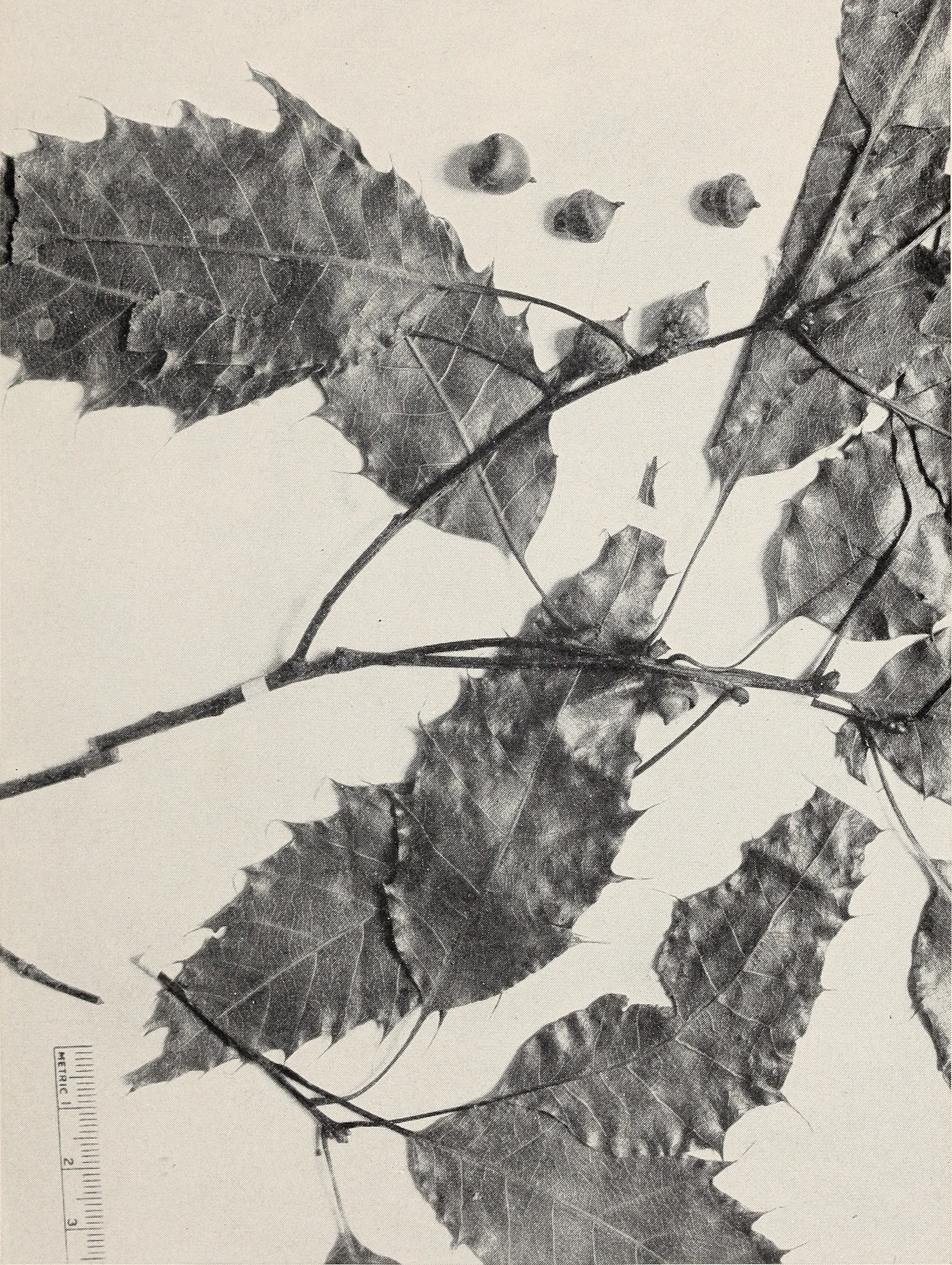

Conservation status
- Data Deficient (IUCN 3.1)

Scientific classification
- Kingdom: Plantae
- Clade: Embryophytes
- Clade: Tracheophytes
- Clade: Spermatophytes
- Clade: Angiosperms
- Clade: Eudicots
- Clade: Rosids
- Order: Fagales
- Family: Fagaceae
- Genus: Quercus
- Subgenus: Quercus subg. Quercus
- Section: Quercus sect. Lobatae
- Species: Q. paxtalensis

Binomial name
- Quercus paxtalensis C.H.Mull.

= Quercus paxtalensis =

Species of oak tree

Quercus paxtalensis is a species of oak endemic to Mexico.

== Description ==
Quercus paxtalensis is a tree which grows from 12 to 18 meters tall, and occasionally to 30 meters tall.

== Range and habitat ==
Quercus paxtalensis is found in the mountains of southern Mexico, including the Sierra Madre Oriental, Sierra Madre de Oaxaca, and Sierra Madre del Sur of Hidalgo, Oaxaca, Tamaulipas and Veracruz states, and the Chiapas Highlands and Sierra Madre de Chiapas of Chiapas state.

This species is native to montane forests, including cloud forest, oak forest, pine–oak forest, and high-elevation tropical dry forest from 1,100 to 1,800 meters elevation. It is associated with Clethra sp., Liquidambar styraciflua, Quercus corrugata, Quercus delgadoana, and Podocarpus matudae.

Subpopulations tend to be small. The species is threatened with habitat loss from frequent fires, livestock grazing, and logging.
