= Quercus meavei =

Conservation status
- Endangered (IUCN 3.1)

Scientific classification
- Kingdom: Plantae
- Clade: Embryophytes
- Clade: Tracheophytes
- Clade: Spermatophytes
- Clade: Angiosperms
- Clade: Eudicots
- Clade: Rosids
- Order: Fagales
- Family: Fagaceae
- Genus: Quercus
- Subgenus: Quercus subg. Quercus
- Section: Quercus sect. Lobatae
- Species: Q. meavei

Binomial name
- Quercus meavei S.Valencia, Sabas & O.J.Soto

Species of flowering plant

Quercus meavei is a species of oak. It is a tree native to central and eastern Mexico, in the southern Sierra Madre Oriental and eastern Trans-Mexican Volcanic Belt of San Luis Potosí, Veracruz, Hidalgo, and Puebla states. It large tree that can grow up to 30 meters tall. It grows in humid montane rain forest and oak forest from 1,630 to 2,250 meters elevation, often in association with Liquidambar styraciflua, Quercus corrugata, Q. sartorii, Q. delgadoana, Carpinus tropicalis, and Fagus mexicana.
