= Magnolia yoroconte =

Conservation status
- Vulnerable (IUCN 3.1)

Scientific classification
- Kingdom: Plantae
- Clade: Embryophytes
- Clade: Tracheophytes
- Clade: Spermatophytes
- Clade: Angiosperms
- Clade: Magnoliids
- Order: Magnoliales
- Family: Magnoliaceae
- Genus: Magnolia
- Section: Magnolia sect. Magnolia
- Species: M. yoroconte

Binomial name
- Magnolia yoroconte Dandy

Species of tree

Magnolia yoroconte is a species of tree in the family Magnoliaceae. It is native to Guatemala, Belize, and Honduras, and to Chiapas and Veracruz in southern Mexico.

== Description ==
Magnolia yoroconte is a large tree, and can live up to 100 years.

== Distribution and habitat ==
Magnolia yoroconte is known from Guatemala, Belize, and Honduras. It has an estimated extent of occurrence (EOO) of over 68,000 km^{2}. Its range includes Columbia Forest Reserve in Toledo District of southern Belize. There are 11 known subpopulations in Guatemala, each with few trees, and separated from one another by over 100 km.

It inhabits cloud forests and submontane forests, particularly along rivers, from 400 up to 2,120 meters elevation.

Populations recorded in Chiapas have now been assigned to new species, Magnolia faustinomirandae and Magnolia zamudioi. It has also been reported in Veracruz, Mexico, but its presence there is unconfirmed and may be another species.

== Conservation ==
The species has a declining population, and is threatened by deforestation, habitat loss, and timber over-harvesting. Its area and habitat quality are estimated to have declined by 30% over the last three generations. The species is of conservation concern in Guatemala and Honduras. Its conservation status is assessed as vulnerable.
