= Yellowbelly voiceless tree frog =

Conservation status
- Endangered (IUCN 3.1)

Scientific classification
- Kingdom: Animalia
- Phylum: Chordata
- Class: Amphibia
- Order: Anura
- Family: Hylidae
- Genus: Charadrahyla
- Species: C. altipotens

Binomial name
- Charadrahyla altipotens (Duellman, 1968)

Species of amphibian

The yellowbelly voiceless tree frog (Charadrahyla altipotens) is a species of frog in the family Hylidae endemic to Mexico.

It inhabits the Pacific slopes of the Sierra Madre del Sur in southern Oaxaca, between 1,300 and 2,000 meters elevation. It is known from two subpopulations, one near San Agustín Loxicha and the other north of the San Gabriel Mixtepec. Its extent of occurrence (EOO) is 2,240 km^{2}, but may occur more widely than currently recorded.

It prefers rocky streams with abundant vegetation in montane pine-oak forests and cloud forests.

It is threatened by habitat loss.
