= Charadrahyla pinorum =

Conservation status
- Vulnerable (IUCN 3.1)

Scientific classification
- Kingdom: Animalia
- Phylum: Chordata
- Class: Amphibia
- Order: Anura
- Family: Hylidae
- Genus: Charadrahyla
- Species: C. pinorum

Binomial name
- Charadrahyla pinorum (Taylor, 1937)

Synonyms
- Hyla pinorum Taylor, 1937; Exerodonta pinorum (Taylor, 1937)

Species of frog

Charadrahyla pinorum is a species of frog in the family Hylidae. It is endemic to the Pacific slopes of Sierra Madre del Sur between central Guerrero and southwestern and central Oaxaca, Mexico. Common names pine wood treefrog and Mexican pine woods treefrog have been proposed for it. Its closest relative is probably Charadrahyla juanitae.

== Description ==
Adult males measure 29–33 mm (1.1–1.3 in) and adult females, based on a single specimen only, 35 mm (1.4 in) in snout–vent length; both Charadrahyla pinorum and Charadrahyla juanitae are small in comparison to other Charadrahyla . The snout in males is rounded in dorsal profile and truncate to rounded in lateral profile. The tympanum is not visible. Adult males have vocal slits. Coloration typically includes conspicuous orange to salmon flash colors, but may occasionally be just gray. Chocolate brown to black middorsal stripe is either complete or entirely absent.

== Habitat and conservation ==
Charadrahyla pinorum occurs in cloud forests, tropical semi-deciduous montane forests, and pine-oak forests at elevations of 700–1,400 m (2,300–4,600 ft) above sea level. It is often found in shallow water or on low vegetation alongside mountain streams. The tadpoles develop in streams. They have been seen to feed on mangos fallen into a stream and being predated by crabs and Belostoma diving bugs.

Charadrahyla pinorum is an uncommon species. It is threatened by habitat loss caused by small-scale agriculture, livestock, and illegal logging. Chytridiomycosis might also be a threat. It is not known to occur in protected areas.
