= Quercus nixoniana =

Conservation status
- Endangered (IUCN 3.1)

Scientific classification
- Kingdom: Plantae
- Clade: Embryophytes
- Clade: Tracheophytes
- Clade: Spermatophytes
- Clade: Angiosperms
- Clade: Eudicots
- Clade: Rosids
- Order: Fagales
- Family: Fagaceae
- Genus: Quercus
- Subgenus: Quercus subg. Quercus
- Section: Quercus sect. Lobatae
- Species: Q. nixoniana

Binomial name
- Quercus nixoniana S.Valencia & Lozada-Pérez

Species of oak tree

Quercus nixoniana is an endangered species of oak tree native to southern Mexico. It is found in humid mountain forests of southwestern Mexico, in the states of Jalisco, Guerrero, and Oaxaca.

== Description ==
Quercus nixoniana is a medium-sized to large tree, growing 20 to 25 meters tall at maturity. Leaves are narrow, lanceolate, and glabrous. Acorns mature within a year.

== Range and habitat ==
Quercus nixoniana has a fragmented distribution in the Sierra Madre del Sur and western Trans-Mexican Volcanic Belt of southwestern Mexico. It is known from four locations – in the eastern Sierra el Cuale and Sierra de Manantlán of southern Jalisco, in the upper basin of the Atoyac River in the Sierra Madre del Sur of Guerrero, and in the Sierra de Miahuatlán of southern Oaxaca. It has an estimated area of occupancy (AOO) of 40 km^{2}.

The tree is native to cloud forests and humid pine–oak and oak forests between 1,300 and 2,300 meters elevation. Associated trees include Carpinus tropicalis and species of Meliosma, Sloanea, Symplocos, Styrax and Tilia.

== Conservation and threats ==
Quercus nixoniana has a limited range, with four widely separated populations. It is threatened by habitat loss from logging, including illegal logging, and conversion of forests to agriculture. Stands of Q. nixoniana were selectively logged in the Sierra de Manantlán during the 1960s. Much of the Sierra de Manantlán is now a biosphere reserve, but the other populations are outside protected areas.
