= Dioscorea juxtlahuacensis =

Scientific classification
- Kingdom: Plantae
- Clade: Tracheophytes
- Clade: Angiosperms
- Clade: Monocots
- Order: Dioscoreales
- Family: Dioscoreaceae
- Genus: Dioscorea
- Species: D. juxtlahuacensis

Binomial name
- Dioscorea juxtlahuacensis (O. Téllez & Dávila) Caddick & Wilkin

Synonyms
- Nanarepenta juxtlahuacensis O. Téllez & Dávila

Species of herbaceous vine

Dioscorea juxtlahuacensis is a plant species endemic to a small area in the State of Oaxaca in southern Mexico. It is known only from the Santiago Juztlahuaca District in the Sierra Madre del Sur mountains, where it grows in deciduous oak-juniper forests at elevations of 1500–1700 m.

Dioscorea juxtlahuacensis is a perennial vine spreading by means of underground rhizomes, trailing on the ground or twining onto other vegetation up to 60 cm above ground. Leaves are heart-shaped, up to 3 cm long and 4 cm wide. Staminate (male) inflorescences are up to 10 cm long, with 1-4 green flowers, formed in the axils of the leaves. Pistillate (female) inflorescences are shorter, only about 1.5 cm long. Seeds are about 1.1 mm long, with an intricate web of raised decorations on the surface.
