= Charadrahyla tecuani =

Conservation status
- Data Deficient (IUCN 3.1)

Scientific classification
- Kingdom: Animalia
- Phylum: Chordata
- Class: Amphibia
- Order: Anura
- Family: Hylidae
- Genus: Charadrahyla
- Species: C. tecuani

Binomial name
- Charadrahyla tecuani (Campbell, Blancas-Hernández, and Smith, 2009 )

Species of frog

Charadrahyla tecuani is a frog in the family Hylidae. It is endemic to Mexico. Scientists have seen it solely in the type locality in the Sierra Madre del Sur mountains.
