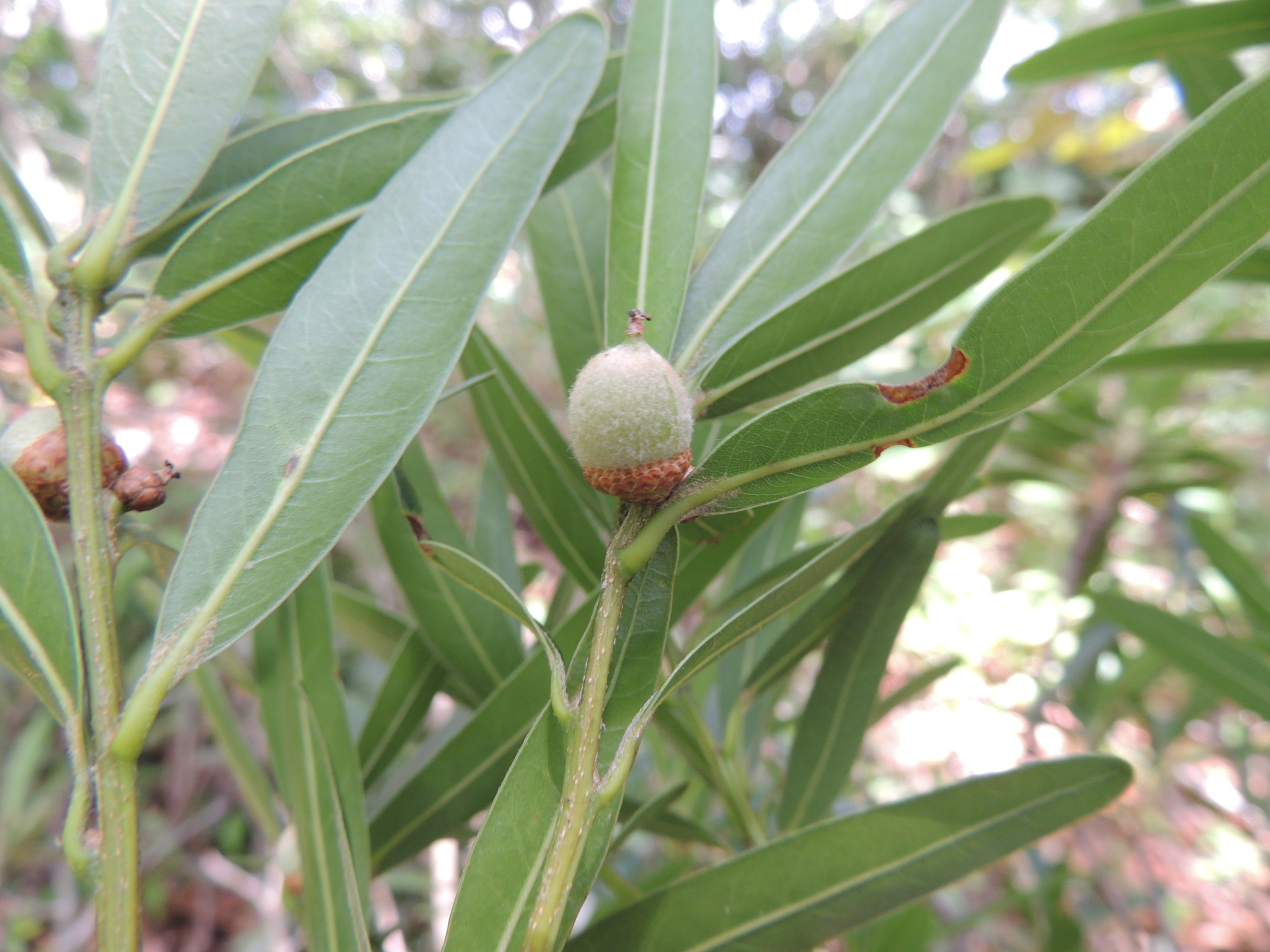

Conservation status
- Critically Endangered (IUCN 3.1)

Scientific classification
- Kingdom: Plantae
- Clade: Embryophytes
- Clade: Tracheophytes
- Clade: Spermatophytes
- Clade: Angiosperms
- Clade: Eudicots
- Clade: Rosids
- Order: Fagales
- Family: Fagaceae
- Genus: Quercus
- Subgenus: Quercus subg. Quercus
- Section: Quercus sect. Lobatae
- Species: Q. mulleri

Binomial name
- Quercus mulleri Martínez

= Quercus mulleri =

Species of oak tree

Quercus mulleri is a rare Mexican species of oak. It has been found only in a small area of the Sierra de Miahuatlán, a sub-range of the Sierra Madre del Sur in southern Oaxaca state.

== Description ==
Quercus mulleri is a small- to medium-sized tree, growing to 12 to 15 meters in height at maturity, and occasionally to 20 meters. It has glossy green leaves, which form a dense crown.

== Habitat and range ==
Quercus mulleri is currently known from a single small population in Miahuatlán District of southern Oaxaca. Here it is found in montane conifer–oak forest on rugged terrain at approximately 1850 meters elevation. The population is estimated at 138 mature individuals, and the species' extent of occurrence (EOO) and area of occupancy (AOO) are both estimated at 4 km^{2}, but may be much smaller, as the known population consists of two patches of trees covering several acres. It was described in 1953 from two other locations, but is no longer found there.

== Conservation and threats ==
Quercus mulleri has a very low population and very limited range, and its conservation status is assessed Critically Endangered. The tree has low reproductive success, creating few acorns and few seedlings. A recent genetic analysis suggests the species is a self-incompatible outbreeder, and may be a relict population from the Pleistocene.

The species' habitat is threatened by logging of Pinus patula in the surrounding area. Its current occurrence site has no formal protection. Recent construction of a road to the species' remaining habitat is likely to increase human disturbance.
