= Quercus salasiae =

Scientific classification
- Kingdom: Plantae
- Clade: Embryophytes
- Clade: Tracheophytes
- Clade: Angiosperms
- Clade: Eudicots
- Clade: Rosids
- Order: Fagales
- Family: Fagaceae
- Genus: Quercus
- Subgenus: Quercus subg. Quercus
- Section: Quercus sect. Lobatae
- Species: Q. salasiae

Binomial name
- Quercus salasiae S.Valencia & O.J.Soto

Species of flowering plant

Quercus salasiae is a species of oak. It is a tree native to the southern Mexican states of Chiapas, Guerrero, and Oaxaca. It grows in the Sierra Madre del Sur from 500 to 1,820 meters elevation.

The species was described by Susana Valencia Ávalos and Oscar Javier Soto Arellano in 2025. It was formerly considered a synonym of Quercus crispifolia. Q. crispifolia differs in having narrowly elliptic leaves, adaxially raised veins, an acute or cuneate base, a long acuminate apex, and an acorn to more than 3 cm long. The species name honors Silvia Salas, a biologist who intensively collected in the state of Oaxaca, including this species.
