= Cladocolea cupulata =

Scientific classification
- Kingdom: Plantae
- Clade: Tracheophytes
- Clade: Angiosperms
- Clade: Eudicots
- Order: Santalales
- Family: Loranthaceae
- Genus: Cladocolea
- Species: C. cupulata

Binomial name
- Cladocolea cupulata Kuijt

Species of plant

Cladocolea cupulata is a species of dioecious, parasitic mistletoe in the family Loranthaceae. The natural range of Cladocolea cupulata is throughout parts of Jalisco, Mexico, where it is known to specifically grow on pine trees (Pinus spp.), such as, Pinus lumholtzii, Pinus herrerae, Pinus gordoniana, Pinus jaliscana, and Pinus georginae.

On average, most parasitized pine trees have 1-5 mistletoe growing on them. It has long, narrow leaves (that tend to grow inwards), with saddle-like peduncles that hold four flowers or so, and a long set of stems similar to other species in the genus. No official conservation status has been assigned to this species yet, although it would most likely check under “Least Concern” if the species were to be evaluated.
