= Charadrahyla sakbah =

Conservation status
- Endangered (IUCN 3.1)

Scientific classification
- Kingdom: Animalia
- Phylum: Chordata
- Class: Amphibia
- Order: Anura
- Family: Hylidae
- Genus: Charadrahyla
- Species: C. sakbah

Binomial name
- Charadrahyla sakbah Jiménez-Arcos, Calzada-Arciniega, Alfaro-Juantorena, Vázquez-Reyes, Blair & Parra-Olea, 2019

Species of frog

Charadrahyla sakbah, the Mixteca cloud-forest tree frog, is a frog in the family Hylidae. It is endemic to Mexico. Scientists know it exclusively from the type locality: 1390 meters above sea level in the western Sierra Madre del Sur, in Oaxaca.

The adult male frog measures 81.15–85.75 mm in snout-vent length and the adult female frog 67.91–73.21 mm. Its large size distinguishes it from other members of the genus. They have hypertrophied webbed skin between their toes. Only frogs from this part of the world have webbing of this kind.
