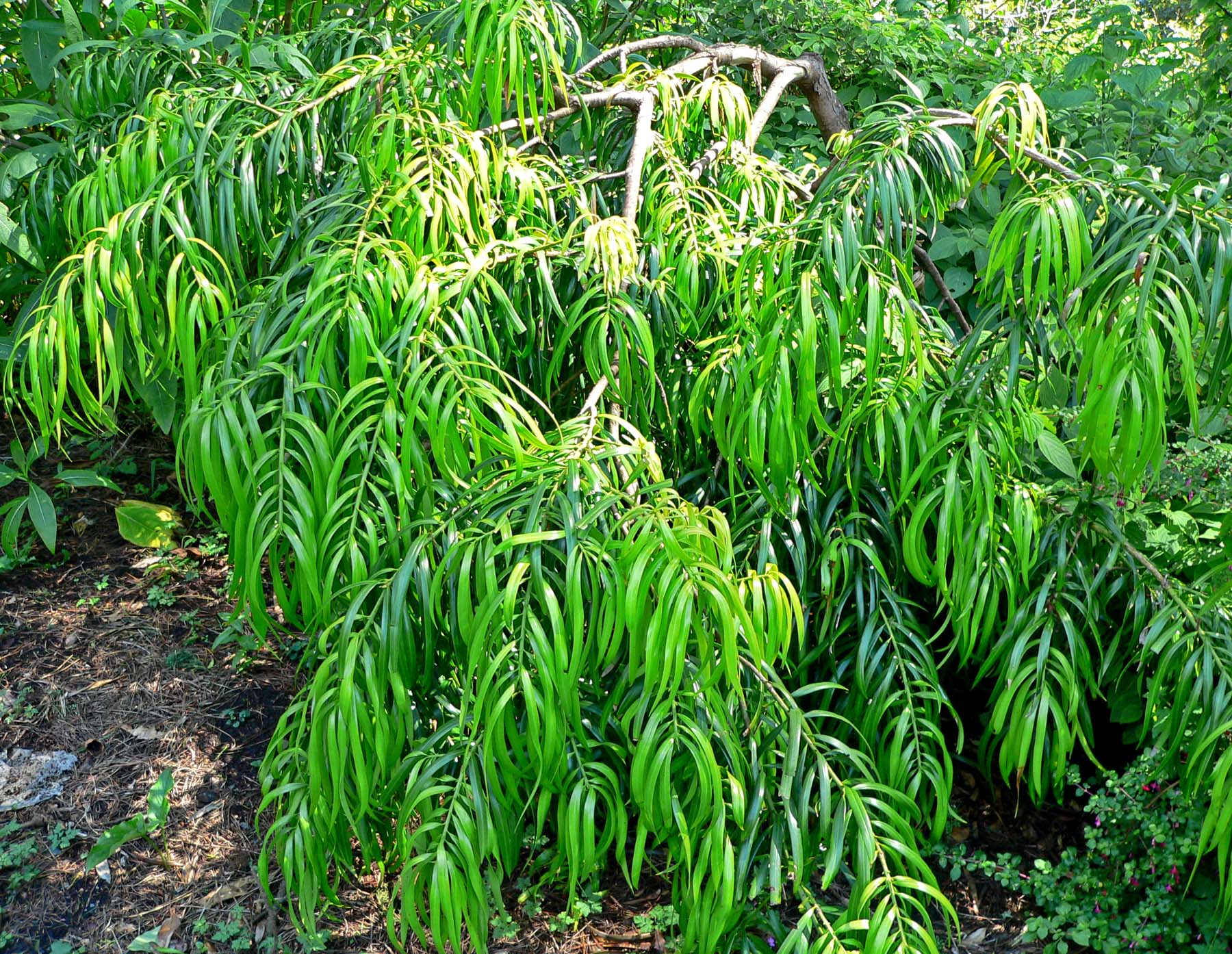

Conservation status
- Vulnerable (IUCN 3.1)

Scientific classification
- Kingdom: Plantae
- Clade: Tracheophytes
- Clade: Gymnosperms
- Division: Pinophyta
- Class: Pinopsida
- Order: Araucariales
- Family: Podocarpaceae
- Genus: Podocarpus
- Species: P. matudae

Binomial name
- Podocarpus matudae Lundell

Synonyms
- Podocarpus reichei J.Buchholz & N.E.Gray; Podocarpus matudai Lundell [orth. error]

= Podocarpus matudae =

Species of conifer

Podocarpus matudae is a species of conifer in the family Podocarpaceae. It is native to Guatemala, El Salvador, Honduras and Mexico.

== Description ==
Podocarpus matudae is a large tree growing to 30 m or more in height, with a trunk diameter of up to 1.5 m. The trunk is usually monopodial and erect. Young trees have thin, smooth, light brown-coloured bark which becomes scaly and grey in colour with age and weathering. Branches tend to be spreading or ascendent, with trees forming a large domed crown with age. Branchlets are straight and slender, with fine grooves formed from leaf bases of fallen foliage.

The flattened leaves can be lanceolate, straight or slightly falcate in shape, even on the same branchlet and have a leathery texture with a prominent, but narrow midrib. Saplings and young plants have longer and wider foliage than mature trees: leaves may be up to 20 cm in length and 17 mm in width in saplings, reduced to between 5–14 cm x 8–13 mm in mature trees.

Solitary cylindrical pollen cones develop at leaf base axils, and when fully grown, may be 30-34 mm in length and 4-5 mm in width. Seed cones are also solitary, held on short peduncles arising from leaf base axils and become swollen, red and succulent before turning a brown-purple colour. Seeds are 6-8 mm in length, slightly flattened and oval-shaped becoming dark brown when dried.

== Habitat and range ==
Podocarpus matudae is found in the mountains in eastern, southern, and western Mexico and northern Central America, where it inhabits cloud forests between 800 and 2400 meters elevation. It grows in moist areas with mild temperatures and average annual rainfall of 1,500 to 3,000 mm, including frequent fog at higher altitudes. Podocarpus matudae generally grows in small and scattered stands among other forest trees, typically oaks (Quercus spp.), along with species of Liquidambar, Magnolia, Ostrya, and Clethra. It is also found in ravines and along streams in montane pine–oak forests. In Jalisco and Nayarit in western Mexico, it is typically associated with Clusia salvinii, Pinus herrerae, Pinus gordoniana, Abies guatemalensis, and Acer sp.

Its range includes the east-facing slopes of the Sierra Madre Occidental and Sierra Madre de Oaxaca from Tamaulipas to northern Oaxaca states, and the coastal Sierra de Los Tuxtlas mountains in Veracruz. It is also found in the Chiapas Highlands of Mexico's Chiapas state and in the Sierra Madre de Chiapas of Chiapas, Guatemala, and El Salvador. These eastern and southern populations are classed as subspecies Podocarpus matudae subsp. matudae.

The population from the mountains of Jalisco and Nayarit states in western Mexico is considered a separate subspecies, Podocarpus matudae subsp. jaliscanus.

== Naming ==
The species name (matudae) is a specific epithet honouring the Japanese-Mexican botanist Eizi Matuda who collected and documented many indigenous Mexican plants, particularly from the state of Chiapas, but also elsewhere across Mexico and the Americas. Matuda also founded the Matuda Herbarium, now a part of the National Herbarium of Mexico, at Universidad Nacional Autonoma de Mexico (UNAM) in Mexico City. The type specimen for Podocarpus matudae was collected by Matuda himself.
