= Charadrahyla nephila =

Conservation status
- Endangered (IUCN 3.1)

Scientific classification
- Kingdom: Animalia
- Phylum: Chordata
- Class: Amphibia
- Order: Anura
- Family: Hylidae
- Genus: Charadrahyla
- Species: C. nephila

Binomial name
- Charadrahyla nephila (Mendelson and Campbell, 1999)

Synonyms
- Hyla nephila Mendelson and Campbell, 1999

Species of frog

Charadrahyla nephila is a species of frog in the family Hylidae. It is endemic to Mexico and occurs in the Sierra de Juárez and Sierra Mixe in the northern Oaxacan highlands; there is also a questionable record from the Sierra de los Tuxtlas, Veracruz. Prior to its description, it was mixed with Hyla chaneque (now Charadrahyla chaneque). The specific name nephila is derived from Greek nephos ("cloud") and philia ("fondness"), referring to the cloud forest habitat of this species. Common name Oaxacan cloud-forest treefrog has been coined for it.

== Description ==
Adult males measure 53–62 mm (2.1–2.4 in) and adult females 60–81 mm (2.4–3.2 in) in snout–vent length. The body is slender. The snout is rounded. The tympanum is distinct and rounded but dorsally obscured by the thick supra-tympanic fold. The fingers and the toes are long, slender, and partially webbed, bearing large terminal discs (slightly smaller in the fingers than in the toes). Dorsal skin is smooth. Coloration is sexually dimorphic: females have reddish brown ground color, whereas that of males gray-brown to mauve. Both sexes have large, irregular blotches on the dorsum. The blotches are usually greenish and bordered with dark brown, but are sometimes uniformly dark brown in some large males. The limbs have dark crossbars. The iris varies from pale copper to bronze and has fine black reticulations.

== Habitat and conservation ==
Charadrahyla nephila inhabits mesic cloud forests at elevations of 680–2,256 m (2,231–7,402 ft) above sea level. It is commonly found in or near streams and low vegetation. Breeding presumably takes place in streams. It is nocturnal.

Charadrahyla nephila is a common species, but its habitat is suffering from a high degree of disturbance. Tadpoles have been found with symptoms indicative of chytridiomycosis, representing an additional threat. It is not known to occur in any protected area.
