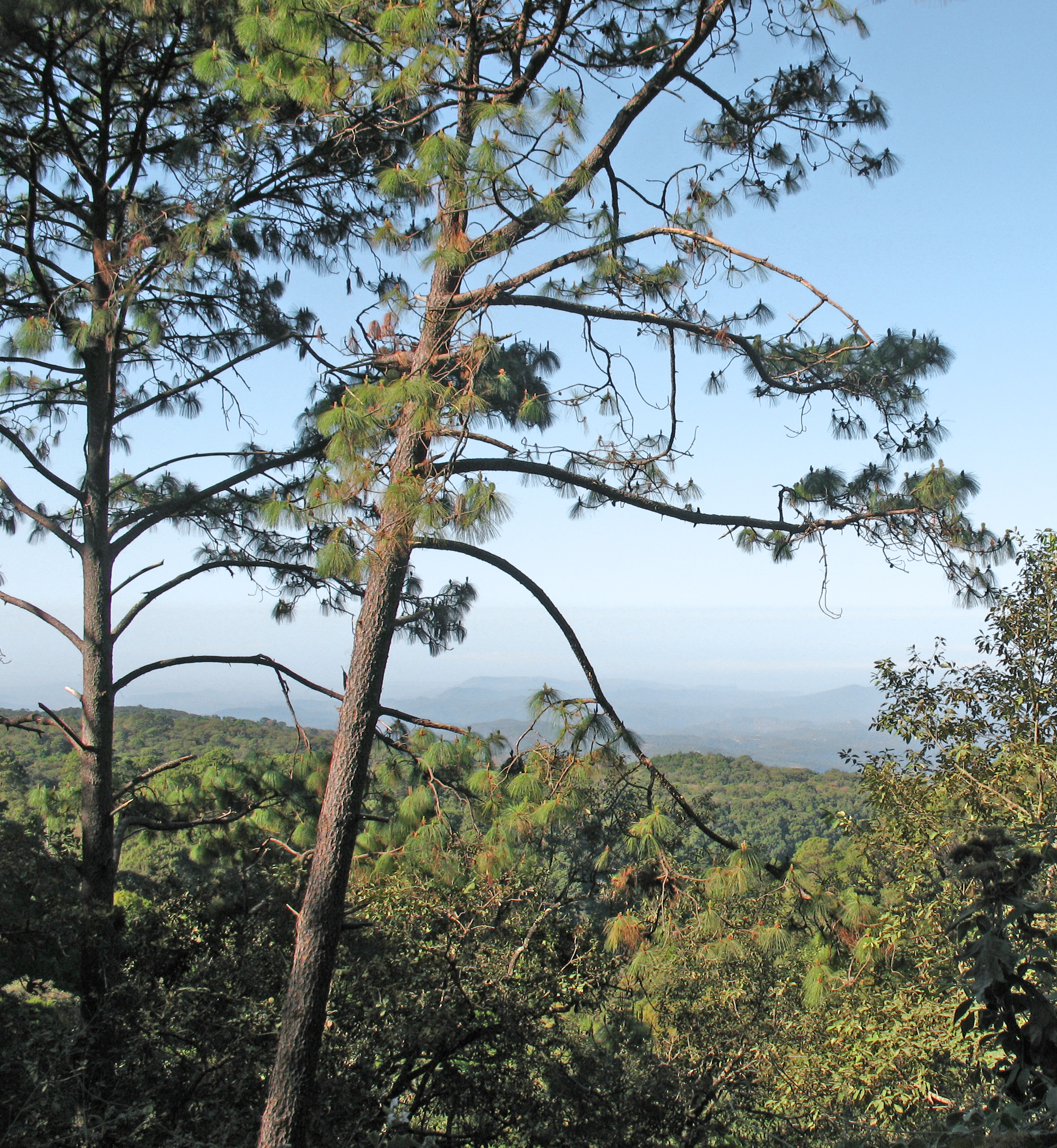

Conservation status
- Least Concern (IUCN 3.1)

Scientific classification
- Kingdom: Plantae
- Clade: Tracheophytes
- Clade: Gymnospermae
- Division: Pinophyta
- Class: Pinopsida
- Order: Pinales
- Family: Pinaceae
- Genus: Pinus
- Subgenus: P. subg. Pinus
- Section: P. sect. Trifoliae
- Subsection: P. subsect. Ponderosae
- Species: P. gordoniana

Binomial name
- Pinus gordoniana Hartw. ex Gord. (1847)
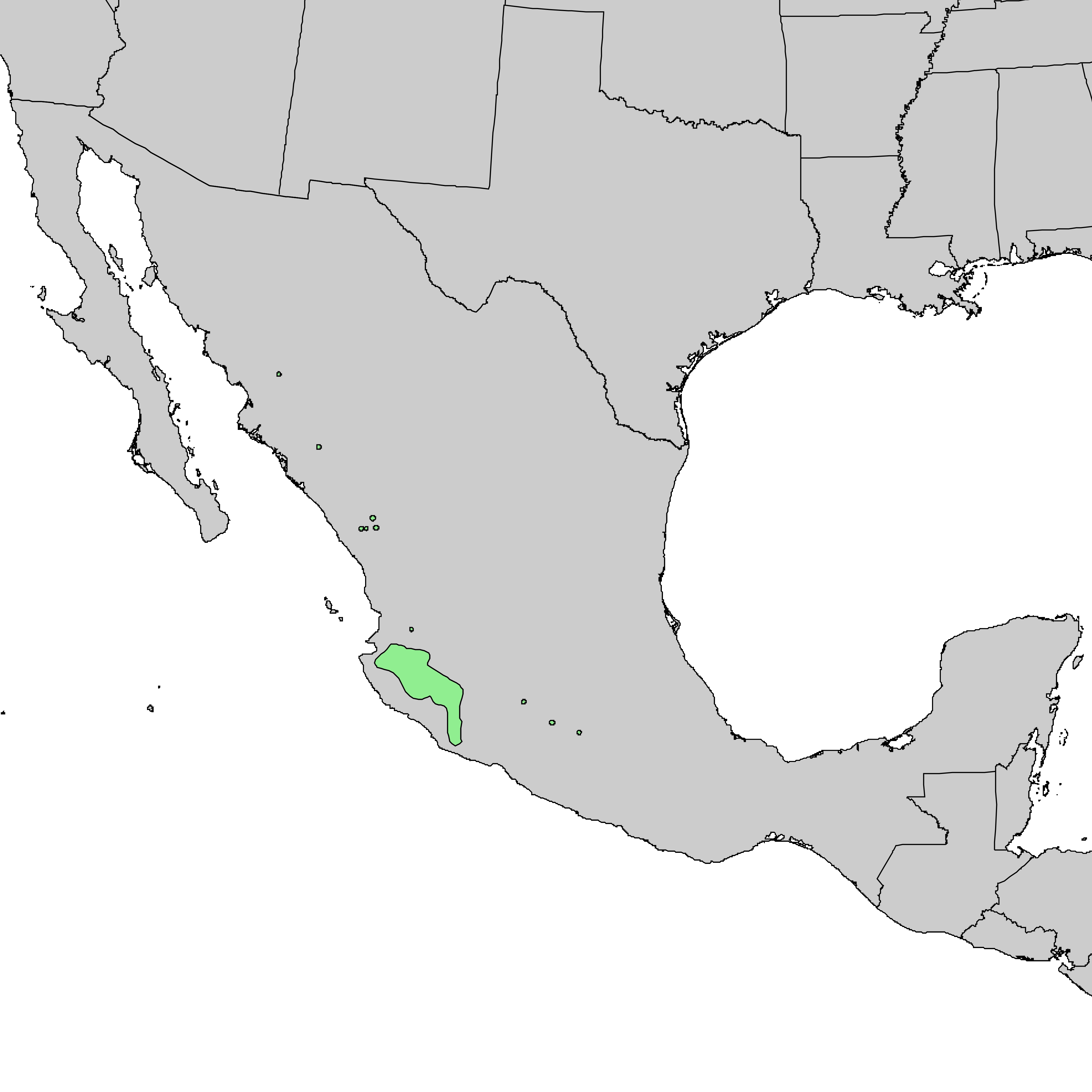
- Natural range of Pinus gordoniana

Synonyms
- Pinus douglasiana Martínez (1943); Pinus montezumae var. gordoniana (Hartweg) Silba (1990)

= Pinus gordoniana =

Species of conifer

Pinus gordoniana (Gordon's pine; syn. Pinus douglasiana) is a species of evergreen conifer in the family Pinaceae, endemic to Mexico. Another common name is Douglas pine, but that name is sometimes applied to the unrelated species Pseudotsuga menziesii which is usually known as Douglas-fir.

== Description ==
Pinus gordoniana is typically a tall tree, up to 35–45 m in height, with a single straight trunk up to 100 cm in diameter at the base. In mature trees the trunk is often clear of branches for 2/3 of the tree's height. The crown is pyramidal in young trees, becoming rounded in older trees, and varying from dense to open. In young trees and new branches the bark is smooth and red-brown. As trees mature the bark becomes rough and scaly, and divided into large irregular plates by deep fissures. The leaves are in fascicles of five, 20–35 cm long; the cones are orange-brown, 7–12 cm long, the scales with a rugose, radially striated surface.

== Habitat and range ==
Pinus gordoniana inhabits the mountains of western and central Mexico, where it grows between 1100–2700 m elevation.

It is found in the southern Sierra Madre Occidental up to the crest of the mountains along the border of Sinaloa and Durango, in the western Trans-Mexican Volcanic Belt in the states of Nayarit, Jalisco, Michoacán, México and Morelos, and locally in the Sierra Madre del Sur of Guerrero and Oaxaca.

It is often found with other pines, including Pinus pseudostrobus, Pinus herrerae, Pinus leiophylla, Pinus lawsonii, and Pinus ayacahuite in the southern part of its range. At lower elevations it is sometimes found with Pinus oocarpa, and with Pinus devoniana on drier sites. In some areas oaks (Quercus spp.) are co-dominant canopy trees, especially in areas which have been logged of pines. In high-elevation, high-rainfall sites in the Sierra Madre Occidental, it occurs with species of Abies, Picea, and Cupressus lusitanica.

It is parasitized by the mistletoe Cladocolea cupulata and the dwarf mistletoe Arceuthobium globosum subsp. grandicaule.

== Conservation and use ==
The tree is harvested commercially for timber. It is assessed as Least Concern in the IUCN Red List.
