= Magnolia krusei =

Conservation status
- Endangered (IUCN 3.1)

Scientific classification
- Kingdom: Plantae
- Clade: Embryophytes
- Clade: Tracheophytes
- Clade: Spermatophytes
- Clade: Angiosperms
- Clade: Magnoliids
- Order: Magnoliales
- Family: Magnoliaceae
- Genus: Magnolia
- Section: Magnolia sect. Magnolia
- Species: M. krusei

Binomial name
- Magnolia krusei J.Jiménez Ram. & Cruz Durán

Species of flowering plant

Magnolia krusei is a species of plant in the family Magnoliaceae. It is endemic to Mexico.

== Description ==
Magnolia krusei is a medium-sized to large tree, growing ups to 25 meters high with a trunk diameter of 50 to 100 cm. It is similar in appearance to Magnolia iltisiana and M. tamaulipana, but differs from those related species in its smaller flowers and follicles. The seeds are spread by birds.

== Range and habitat ==
Magnolia krusei is known from one location in the Sierra Madre del Sur of central Guerrero state, around Acahuizotla and San Roque in the mountains south of Chilpancingo. A second population may occur further east in the Sierra Madre del Sur of neighboring Oaxaca state. Its known population has an estimated area of occupancy of only 10 to 500 km^{2}. The area of potential forest remaining in the area is 9,120 km^{2}.

It is found in montane cloud forests dominated by oaks (Quercus spp.) on soils derived from shale rocks between 1140 and 1600 meters elevation.

== Conservation ==
The species threatened by habitat loss from forest clearance, including for illegal crops. Its known populations are outside protected areas, and there is no plan for the species' conservation. It is assessed as endangered.
