= Spine-fingered tree frog =

Conservation status
- Endangered (IUCN 3.1)

Scientific classification
- Kingdom: Animalia
- Phylum: Chordata
- Class: Amphibia
- Order: Anura
- Family: Hylidae
- Genus: Charadrahyla
- Species: C. trux

Binomial name
- Charadrahyla trux (Adler & Dennis, 1972)

Species of amphibian

The spine-fingered tree frog (Charadrahyla trux) is a species of frog in the family Hylidae endemic to Mexico. Its natural habitat is subtropical or tropical moist montane forests and rivers. It is found in the Sierra Madre del Sur of Guerrero state, on Cerro Teotepec between 1,450 and 2,415 meters elevation, and northwest of Asoleadero. Its extent of occurrence (EOO) is 478 km^{2}.

As it is thought to be restricted to a limited area, and to be threatened by habitat loss and possibly chytridiomycosis, it is currently classified as endangered.
