= Charadrahyla esperancensis =

Conservation status
- Vulnerable (IUCN 3.1)

Scientific classification
- Kingdom: Animalia
- Phylum: Chordata
- Class: Amphibia
- Order: Anura
- Family: Hylidae
- Genus: Charadrahyla
- Species: C. esperancensis

Binomial name
- Charadrahyla esperancensis Canseco-Márquez, Ramírez-González, and González-Bernal, 2017

Species of amphibian

Charadrahyla esperancensis, the Esperanza tree frog, is a frog in the family Hylidae. It is endemic to Mexico. Scientists have seen it in Oaxaca at 1640 meters above sea level.

== Morphology ==
The adult male frog measures 44.3 to 48.9 mm in snout-vent length.

This frog has smooth skin on the dorsal side of its back and legs and granular skin on its ventrum. The top of the head and top of the back are either light brown or olive green in color. The sides of the head have dark brown masking from the nose to the tympanum. The sides of the frog's body are dark brown with irregular yellow spots. The tops of the legs are light brown with darker brown transverse stripes. The legs also have yellow spots. This climbing disks on the frog's toes are dark in color than the rest of the toe. The ventrum is light in color.

== Etymology ==
"Esperanza" is "hope" in Spanish. Scientists named after the place where they saw the frog: La Esperanza in Sierra Juarez.

== Conservation ==
This frog is classified as vulnerable to extinction. Possible causes include habitat loss, habitat fragmentation and the resulting reduced genetic diversity, disturbances from motor vehicle traffic, disease, general urbanization, and both climate change and the resulting increased UVB exposure.

Residents near La Esperanza have conserved 4000 hectares of land to preserve habitat for this frog and other species.
