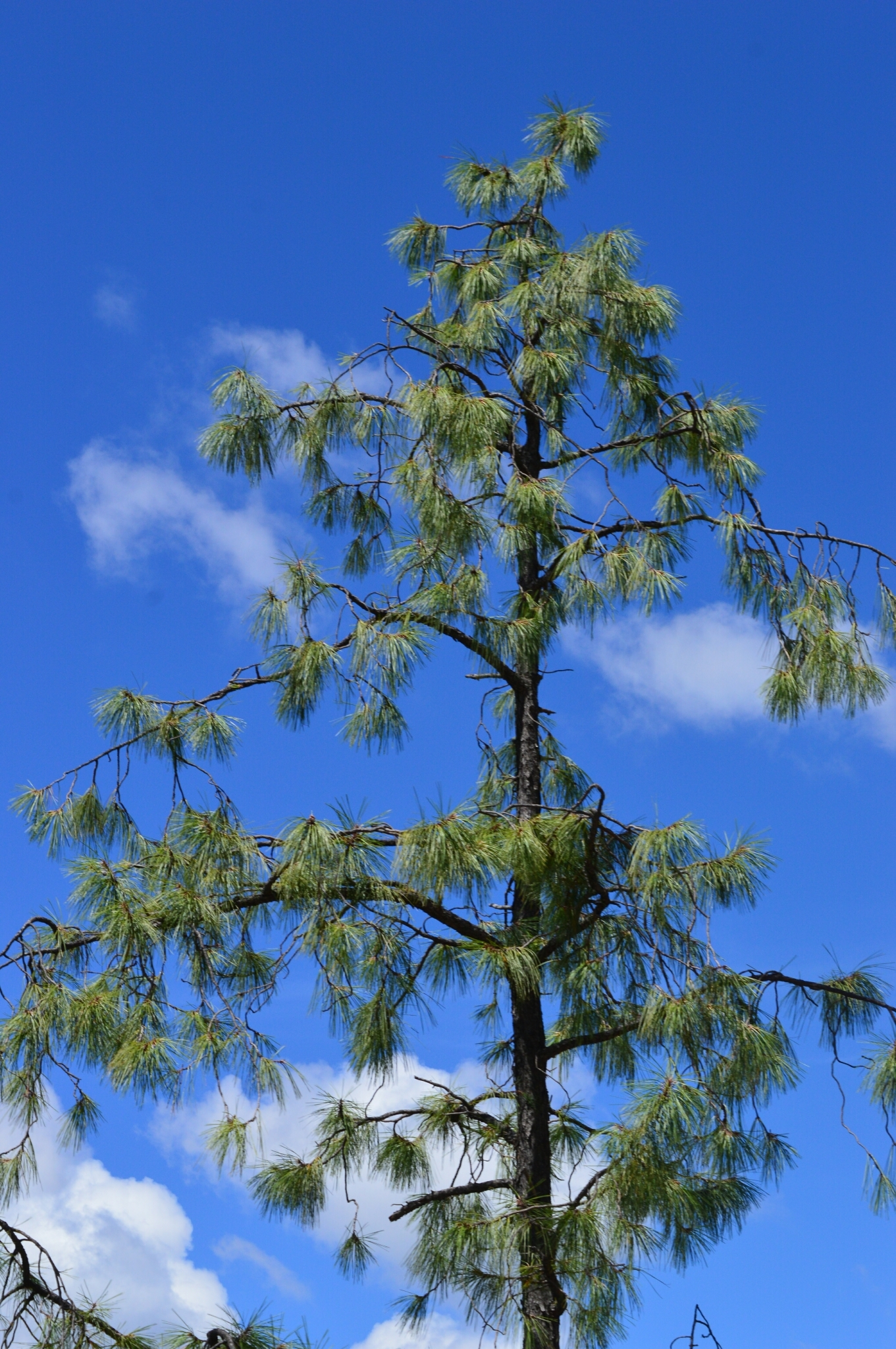

Conservation status
- Least Concern (IUCN 3.1)

Scientific classification
- Kingdom: Plantae
- Clade: Tracheophytes
- Clade: Gymnosperms
- Division: Pinophyta
- Class: Pinopsida
- Order: Pinales
- Family: Pinaceae
- Genus: Pinus
- Subgenus: P. subg. Pinus
- Section: P. sect. Trifoliae
- Subsection: P. subsect. Australes
- Species: P. luzmariae

Binomial name
- Pinus luzmariae Pérez de la Rosa

= Pinus luzmariae =

Species of conifer

Pinus luzmariae is a species of conifer in the family Pinaceae. It is a pine native to Honduras and southwest Mexico. It forms hybrids with Pinus herrerae which display hybrid vigor. Both species are placed in Pinus subsect. Australes.
