= Magnolia vazquezii =

Conservation status
- Endangered (IUCN 3.1)

Scientific classification
- Kingdom: Plantae
- Clade: Embryophytes
- Clade: Tracheophytes
- Clade: Spermatophytes
- Clade: Angiosperms
- Clade: Magnoliids
- Order: Magnoliales
- Family: Magnoliaceae
- Genus: Magnolia
- Section: Magnolia sect. Magnolia
- Species: M. vazquezii

Binomial name
- Magnolia vazquezii Cruz Durán & K.Vega

Species of tree

Magnolia vazquezii is a species of flowering plant in the family Magnoliaceae. It is endemic to the Sierra Madre del Sur of Guerrero state in southern Mexico.

== Description ==
Magnolia vazquezii is a tree that grows between 14 and 18 meters tall at maturity. It flowers and fruits from March to May, and has been found with fruit as late as November. Magnolia vazquezii is distinct from other Magnolia species in having clustered flowers rather than solitary ones, with the terminal flower more mature than the interior ones. It has four sepals rather than the typical three.

The species was classed as Magnolia schiedeana, which is native to the Sierra Madre Oriental, until being recognized as a distinct species.

== Range and habitat ==
Magnolia vazquezii is endemic to the municipality of San Luis Acatlan in the Sierra Madre del Sur of Guerrero state in southern Mexico. The species' estimated extent of occurrence (EOO) is less than 500 km^{2}.

It is a montane cloud forest species, growing at elevations between 2,150 and 2,342 meters. It grows in soils with abundant leaf litter, associated with the trees Clethra mexicana and species of pine, oak, and Oreopanax.

== Conservation ==
Magnolia vazquezii has a small range, and a decreasing population estimated at 300 mature individuals. The species' conservation status is assessed as endangered.
