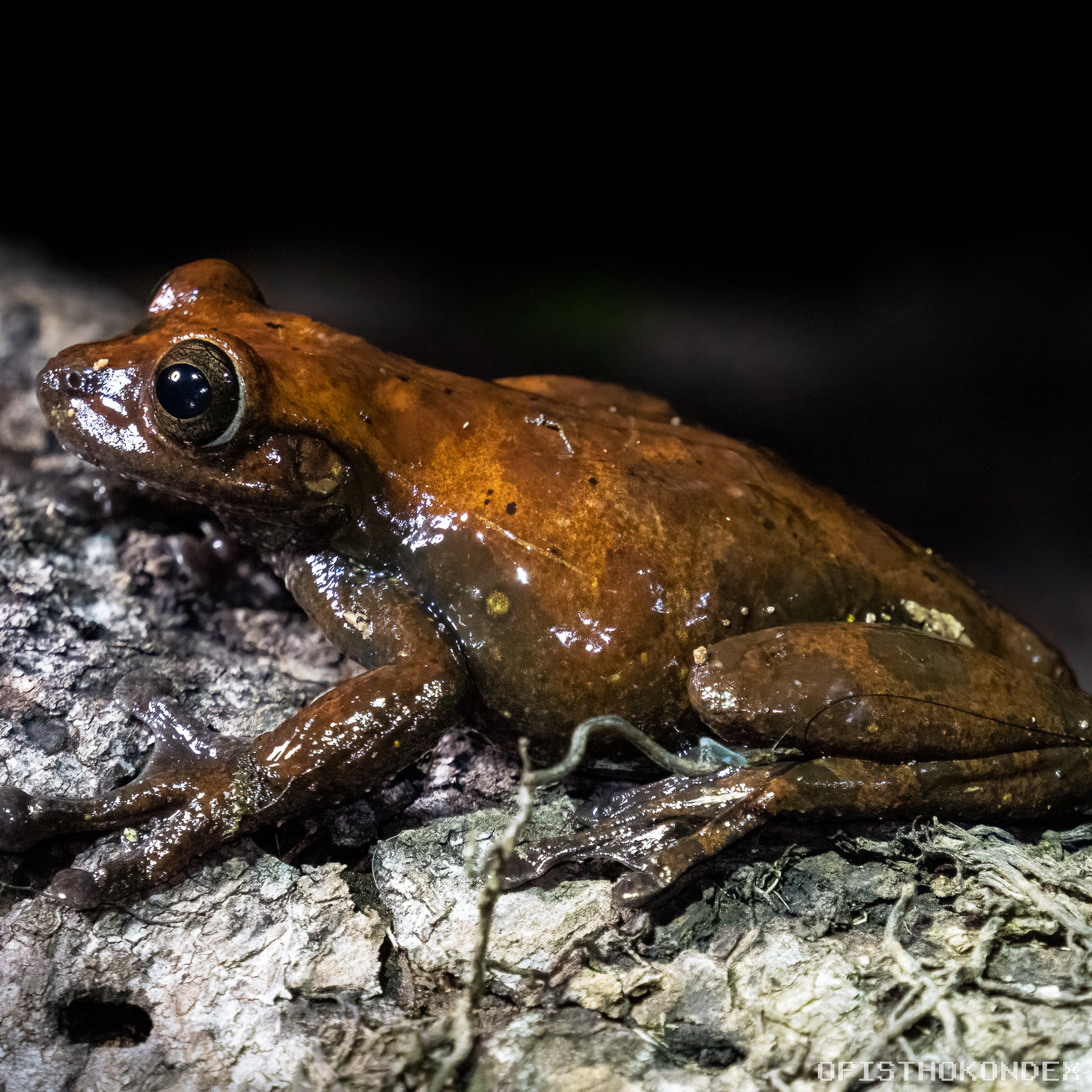

Conservation status
- Vulnerable (IUCN 3.1)

Scientific classification
- Kingdom: Animalia
- Phylum: Chordata
- Class: Amphibia
- Order: Anura
- Family: Hylidae
- Genus: Charadrahyla
- Species: C. taeniopus

Binomial name
- Charadrahyla taeniopus (Günther, 1901)

= Porthole tree frog =

Species of amphibian

The porthole tree frog (Charadrahyla taeniopus) is a species of frog in the family Hylidae endemic to Mexico. Its natural habitats are subtropical or tropical moist montane forests and rivers. It is threatened by habitat loss.

== General references ==
- Santos-Barrera, G.; Canseco-Márquez, L. (2004). "Charadrahyla taeniopus". IUCN Red List of Threatened Species. 2004 e.T55671A11350853. doi:10.2305/IUCN.UK.2004.RLTS.T55671A11350853.en.
