= Mesoamerican pine–oak forests =

Ecoregion of southern Mexico and Central America

The Mesoamerican pine–oak forests is a composite ecoregion of southern Mexico and Central America, designated by the World Wildlife Fund as one of their Global 200 ecoregions, a list of priority ecoregions for conservation.

These forests include montane subtropical forests where pine and oak trees predominate, stretching across several major mountain ranges, including the Trans-Mexican Volcanic Belt and the Sierra Madre del Sur. Ecoregions include:

- Central American montane forests
- Central American pine–oak forests
- Chimalapas montane forests
- Sierra Madre del Sur pine–oak forests
- Sierra Madre de Oaxaca pine–oak forests
- Trans-Mexican Volcanic Belt pine–oak forests

== See also ==
- Madrean pine–oak woodlands
