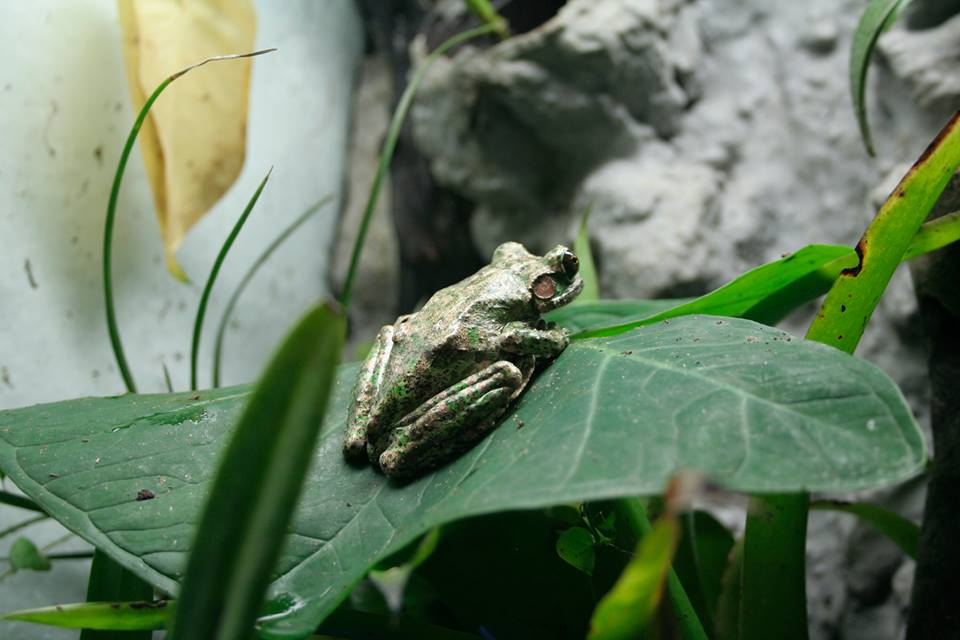
- Charadrahyla chaneque

Scientific classification
- Kingdom: Animalia
- Phylum: Chordata
- Class: Amphibia
- Order: Anura
- Family: Hylidae
- Subfamily: Hylinae
- Genus: Charadrahyla; Faivovich, Haddad, Garcia, Frost, Campbell, and Wheeler, 2005

Type species
- Hyla taeniopus Günther, 1901

Species
- 10 species (see text)

= Charadrahyla =

Genus of amphibians

Charadrahyla is a genus of frogs in the family Hylidae. It is endemic to tropical southern Mexico. The generic name was derived from Greek charadra ("ravine") and Hyla, in reference to the habits of these frogs. Accordingly, common name ravine treefrogs has been coined for the genus.

== Taxonomy and systematics ==
This genus was erected in 2005 following a major revision of the Hylidae. It corresponds to the former Hyla taeniopus group as defined by William E. Duellman in 1970. The genus was originally diagnosed using molecular markers; no morphological synapomorphies supporting the new genus could be identified. The sister taxon of Charadrahyla is Megastomatohyla.

Five of the species in this genus were previously placed in the genus Hyla. Two species were later described as new in this genus, and another two were transferred from Exerodonta in 2018 based on molecular data.

== Description ==
Charadrahyla are relatively large, stream-breeding frogs from cloud forests and humid pine-oak forests of central and southern Mexico. In the majority of species males measure 44–81 mm (1.7–3.2 in) and females 60–81 mm (2.4–3.2 in) in snout–vent length, but the former Exerodonta species, Charadrahyla juanitae and Charadrahyla pinorum, are much smaller, with males measuring 28–36 mm (1.1–1.4 in) and females 35–40 mm (1.4–1.6 in). Most species have a brownish dorsum with large blotches (exception is Charadrahyla altipotens).

== Species ==
As of 2019, there are ten recognized species:

- Charadrahyla altipotens (Duellman, 1968) – yellowbelly voiceless tree frog
- Charadrahyla chaneque (Duellman, 1961) – fairy tree frog
- Charadrahyla esperancensis Canseco-Márquez, Ramírez-González, and González-Bernal, 2017
- Charadrahyla juanitae (Snyder, 1972)
- Charadrahyla nephila (Mendelson and Campbell, 1999)
- Charadrahyla pinorum (Taylor, 1937)
- Charadrahyla sakbah Jiménez-Arcos, Calzada-Arciniega, Alfaro-Juantorena, Vázquez-Reyes, Blair & Parra-Olea, 2019
- Charadrahyla taeniopus (Günther, 1901) – porthole tree frog
- Charadrahyla tecuani Campbell, Blancas-Hernández, and Smith, 2009
- Charadrahyla trux (Adler and Dennis, 1972) – spine-fingered tree frog
