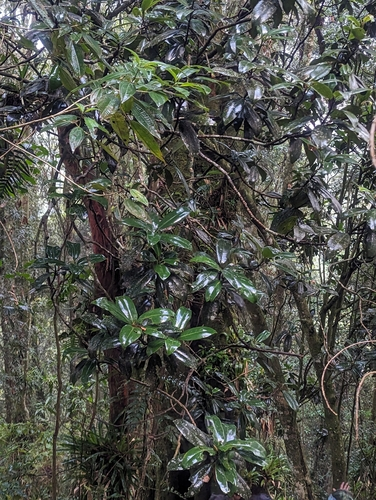

Conservation status
- Vulnerable (IUCN 3.1)

Scientific classification
- Kingdom: Plantae
- Clade: Embryophytes
- Clade: Tracheophytes
- Clade: Spermatophytes
- Clade: Angiosperms
- Clade: Magnoliids
- Order: Magnoliales
- Family: Magnoliaceae
- Genus: Magnolia
- Section: Magnolia sect. Magnolia
- Species: M. schiedeana

Binomial name
- Magnolia schiedeana Schldl.

= Magnolia schiedeana =

Species of tree

Magnolia schiedeana is a species of flowering plant in the family Magnoliaceae. It is endemic to Mexico, where it occurs along the slopes of the Gulf of Mexico.

== Description ==
Magnolia schiedeana is a tree growing up to 25 meters tall. It flowers from April to June.

== Range and habitat ==
Magnolia schiedeana is native to the southern Sierra Madre Oriental in eastern Mexico, in the states of Hidalgo, Puebla, and Veracruz. It is known from about 14 scattered populations including Acatlán, Veracruz and the La Cortadura cloud forest of Coatepec, Veracruz. The species' estimated potential forest distribution is 17,411 km^{2}.

It is native to cloud forests between 1,200 and 2,100 meters elevation, and is associated with oaks. In the cloud forest of Eloxochitlán, Hidalgo, M. schiedeana ranges from 1,400 to 2,210 meters elevation, and below 1700 meters it is an important canopy tree, growing 20 meters high in association with oaks.

The species' distribution is allopatric, with the populations separated by the distribution of suitable cloud forest habitats in Mexico's mountains. Several populations once classed as Magnolia schiedeana are now considered separate species, including Magnolia pedrazae in San Luis Potosí and Querétaro, Magnolia oaxacensis in Oaxaca, Magnolia guerrerensis and Magnolia vazquezii in Guerrero, and Magnolia zamudioi in Oaxaca and southern Veracruz.

== Ecology and reproduction ==
Flowers are pollinated by the endemic beetle Cyclocephala jalapensis. The plants can reproduce sexually, producing seeds which are dispersed by small mammals. It often reproduces by vegetative means, sprouting from the base. Magnolia schiedeana is a larval food plant for the Lepidoptera species Papilio garamas abderus (Papilionidae), Paradirphia hoegei (Saturniidae: Hemileucinae), and Jonaspyge jonas (Hesperiidae).

== Conservation ==
The species' cloud forest habitat is threatened and degraded by timber harvesting and clearance for agriculture. Its conservation status is assessed as vulnerable.
