= Magnolia zamudioi =

Conservation status
- Data Deficient (IUCN 3.1)

Scientific classification
- Kingdom: Plantae
- Clade: Embryophytes
- Clade: Tracheophytes
- Clade: Spermatophytes
- Clade: Angiosperms
- Clade: Magnoliids
- Order: Magnoliales
- Family: Magnoliaceae
- Genus: Magnolia
- Section: Magnolia sect. Magnolia
- Species: M. zamudioi

Binomial name
- Magnolia zamudioi A.Vázquez

Species of tree

Magnolia zamudioi is a species of flowering plant in the family Magnoliaceae. It is endemic to Mexico, where it is found in the mountains of southern Veracruz and Chiapas.

== Description ==
Magnolia zamudioi is a tree that grows from 15 to 30 meters tall. It has elliptic to lanceolate leaves, 10 – 13 cm long by 3.5 – 5.5 cm wide. It flowers from March to June and fruits from August to December. Flowers have 90 to 100 stamens and 26 – 32 carpels.

The species was classed as Magnolia schiedeana until being recognized as a distinct species. It has a similar leave shape to Magnolia faustinomirandae, but differs in having smaller leaves, and fewer stamens and carpels.

== Range and habitat ==
Magnolia zamudioi is known from two sites, Tecpatán at the western end of the Chiapas Highlands of Chiapas, and in the coastal Sierra de los Tuxtlas in southern Veracruz. In Tecpatán is abundant around the summit of Cerro Mono Pelón, where it grows in tropical rain forest with Geonoma interrupta between 800 and 850 meters elevation, and in oak–Liquidambar styraciflua forest at 800 meters elevation. In the Sierra de los Tuxtlas it has been found at approximately 800 meters elevation along a roadside in Catemaco Municipality, and in Mecayapan along a steep ridge slope of Volcán Santa Marta.
