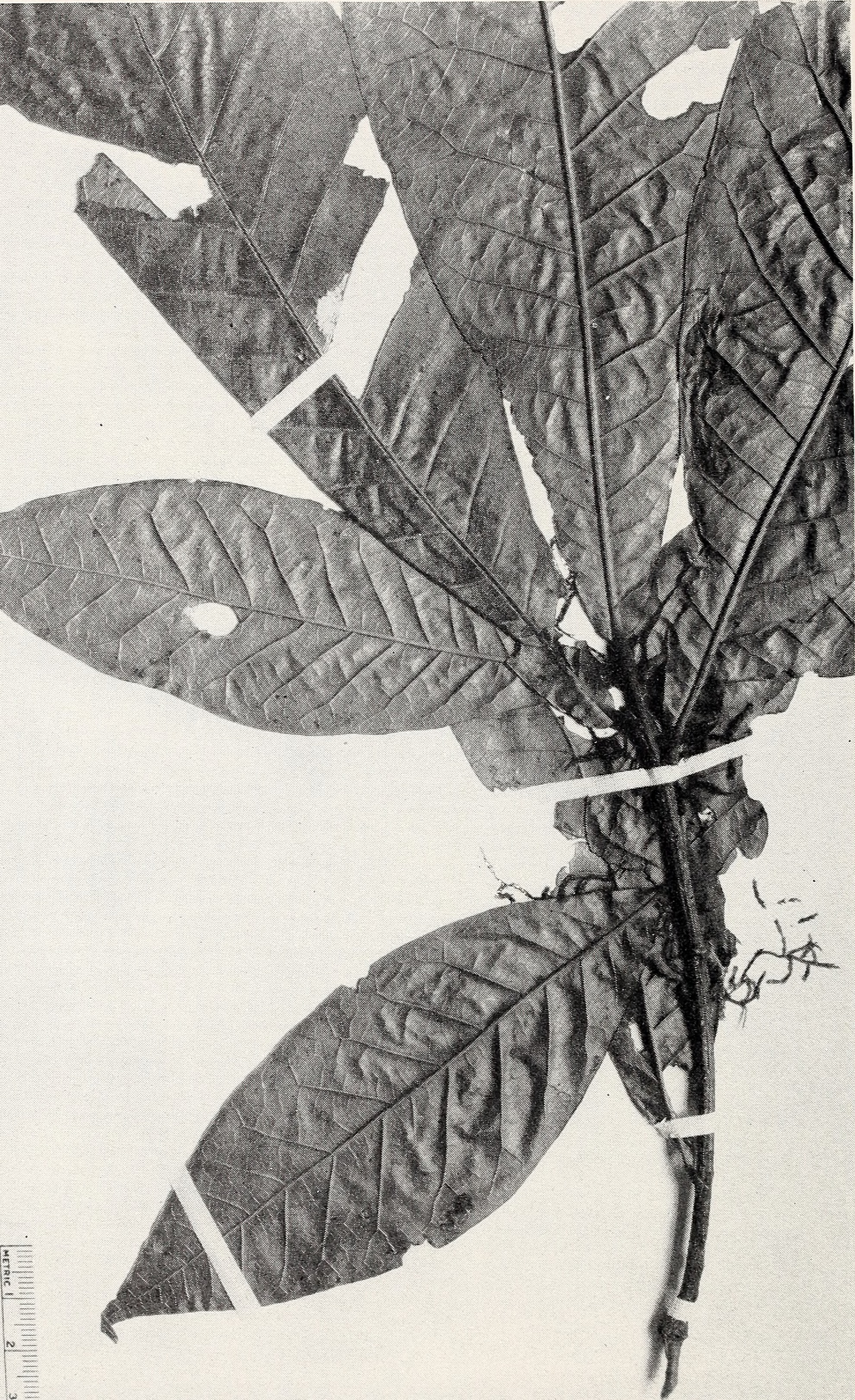

Conservation status
- Near Threatened (IUCN 3.1)

Scientific classification
- Kingdom: Plantae
- Clade: Embryophytes
- Clade: Tracheophytes
- Clade: Spermatophytes
- Clade: Angiosperms
- Clade: Eudicots
- Clade: Rosids
- Order: Fagales
- Family: Fagaceae
- Genus: Quercus
- Subgenus: Quercus subg. Quercus
- Section: Quercus sect. Lobatae
- Species: Q. crispifolia

Binomial name
- Quercus crispifolia Trel.

Synonyms
- Quercus amphioxys Trel.; Quercus incrassata Trel.

= Quercus crispifolia =

Species of oak tree

Quercus crispifolia is a species of oak tree. It is native to southern Mexico, Guatemala, and El Salvador. It is placed in section Lobatae.

== Range and habitat ==
Quercus crispifolia is native to Guerrero, Oaxaca, and Chiapas states of southern Mexico, where it lives in the Sierra Madre del Sur and Chiapas Highlands, and in the Sierra Madre de Chiapas of Chiapas, Guatemala, and El Salvador. It has an estimated area of occupancy (AOO) of 104 km^{2}.

Quercus crispifolia is native to low montane rain forests from 900 to 2,700 meters elevation.

Much of the species' montane forest habitat has been replaced with coffee plantations. A population is conserved within El Triunfo Biosphere Reserve.
