= Quercus rubramenta =

Conservation status
- Vulnerable (IUCN 3.1)

Scientific classification
- Kingdom: Plantae
- Clade: Embryophytes
- Clade: Tracheophytes
- Clade: Spermatophytes
- Clade: Angiosperms
- Clade: Eudicots
- Clade: Rosids
- Order: Fagales
- Family: Fagaceae
- Genus: Quercus
- Subgenus: Quercus subg. Quercus
- Section: Quercus sect. Lobatae
- Species: Q. rubramenta

Binomial name
- Quercus rubramenta Trel.

Species of oak tree

Quercus rubramenta is a species of oak. It is native to the Sierra Madre del Sur of Guerrero and Oaxaca states in southern Mexico.
