= Quercus obtusanthera =

Scientific classification
- Kingdom: Plantae
- Clade: Embryophytes
- Clade: Tracheophytes
- Clade: Angiosperms
- Clade: Eudicots
- Clade: Rosids
- Order: Fagales
- Family: Fagaceae
- Genus: Quercus
- Subgenus: Quercus subg. Quercus
- Section: Quercus sect. Lobatae
- Species: Q. obtusanthera

Binomial name
- Quercus obtusanthera Trel.

Species of flowering plant

Quercus obtusanthera is a species of oak. It is a tree endemic to the state of Guerrero in southern Mexico. It is known from the Sierra Madre del Sur at 2000 meters elevation.

The species was described by William Trelease in 1934.
