= Magnolia oaxacensis =

Conservation status
- Endangered (IUCN 3.1)

Scientific classification
- Kingdom: Plantae
- Clade: Embryophytes
- Clade: Tracheophytes
- Clade: Spermatophytes
- Clade: Angiosperms
- Clade: Magnoliids
- Order: Magnoliales
- Family: Magnoliaceae
- Genus: Magnolia
- Section: Magnolia sect. Magnolia
- Species: M. oaxacensis

Binomial name
- Magnolia oaxacensis A.Vázquez

Species of tree

Magnolia oaxacensis is a species of flowering plant in the family Magnoliaceae. It is endemic to the Sierra Madre de Oaxaca of Oaxaca state in southern Mexico.

== Description ==
Magnolia oaxacensis is a small tree that grows up to 5 meters tall.

The species was classed as Magnolia schiedeana, which is native to the Sierra Madre Oriental, until being recognized as a distinct species.

== Range and habitat ==
Magnolia oaxacensis is endemic to the Sierra Mazateca, part of the Sierra Madre de Oaxaca in northern Oaxaca state. The species' estimated extent of occurrence (EOO) is about 1000 km^{2}.

Magnolia oaxacensis grows in montane cloud forests from 2,000 to 2,100 meters elevation. It is sometimes found around swampy pond margins. The trees are typically scattered among trees of other species.

== Conservation ==
Magnolia oaxacensis has a small range and a decreasing population. It is subject to habitat loss from excessive timber harvesting and conversion of forest lands to agriculture and livestock pasture, and much of its remaining habitat is on steep slopes. Mature trees are seldom found with seedlings or saplings nearby, and the fruits rarely produce seed. The species' conservation status is assessed as endangered.
