= Cladocolea =

- Cladocolea inconspicua

Scientific classification
- Kingdom: Plantae
- Clade: Tracheophytes
- Clade: Angiosperms
- Clade: Eudicots
- Order: Santalales
- Family: Loranthaceae
- Genus: Cladocolea; Tiegh.

Genus of flowering plants

Cladocolea is a genus of flowering plants in the family Loranthaceae. Species in the genus are native to Mexico and tropical America.

Species:

- Cladocolea alternifolia (Eichler) Kuijt
- Cladocolea andrieuxii Tiegh.
- Cladocolea clandestina (Mart.) Kuijt
- Cladocolea coriacea Kuijt
- Cladocolea coyucae Kuijt
- Cladocolea cupulata Kuijt
- Cladocolea dimorpha Kuijt
- Cladocolea diversifolia (Benth.) Kuijt
- Cladocolea elliptica Kuijt
- Cladocolea glauca Kuijt
- Cladocolea gracilis Kuijt
- Cladocolea grahamii (Benth.) Tiegh.
- Cladocolea harlingii Kuijt
- Cladocolea hintonii Kuijt
- Cladocolea hondurensis Kuijt
- Cladocolea inconspicua (Benth.) Kuijt
- Cladocolea intermedia (Rizzini) Kuijt
- Cladocolea × kuijtii Martínez-Ambr. & Cruz Durán
- Cladocolea loniceroides (Tiegh.) Kuijt
- Cladocolea mcvaughii Kuijt
- Cladocolea micrantha (Eichler) Kuijt
- Cladocolea microphylla (Kunth) Kuijt
- Cladocolea molotensis Martínez-Ambr. & Lozada-Pérez
- Cladocolea oligantha (Standl. & Steyerm.) Kuijt
- Cladocolea pedicellata Kuijt
- Cladocolea pringlei Kuijt
- Cladocolea racemosa Kuijt
- Cladocolea rostrifolia Kuijt
- Cladocolea sandwithii (Maguire) Kuijt
- Cladocolea spathiflora Galv.-González, Cerros, Espejo & López-Ferr.
- Cladocolea stricta Kuijt
