= Magnolia pedrazae =

Conservation status
- Endangered (IUCN 3.1)

Scientific classification
- Kingdom: Plantae
- Clade: Embryophytes
- Clade: Tracheophytes
- Clade: Spermatophytes
- Clade: Angiosperms
- Clade: Magnoliids
- Order: Magnoliales
- Family: Magnoliaceae
- Genus: Magnolia
- Section: Magnolia sect. Magnolia
- Species: M. pedrazae

Binomial name
- Magnolia pedrazae A.Vázquez

Species of tree

Magnolia pedrazae is a species of flowering plant in the family Magnoliaceae. It is endemic to the Sierra Madre Oriental of eastern Mexico.

== Description ==
Magnolia pedrazae is a tree that grows from 10 to 20 meters tall. It has broadly elliptic leaves, (10.5–) 13 – 18 long by (5.5) 6 – 8.5 cm wide. It flowers in June and fruits from August to December.

The species was classed as Magnolia schiedeana until being recognized as a distinct species. M. schiedeana is also a cloud forest species, found further south in the Sierra Madre Oriental. M. pedrazae is distinguished from M. schiedeana in having broadly elliptic leaves rather than lanceolate elliptic ones, 100–110 stamens rather than ca. 20, yellowish pubescent polyfollicles and peduncle rather than glabrous ones, and 34 – 40 carpels rather than ca. 20.

== Range and habitat ==
Magnolia pedrazae is native to the Sierra Gorda, a sub-range of the Sierra Madre Oriental in eastern Mexico. It has been found in the localities of La Yesca, La Joya del Hielo, Las Flores, La Silleta, and Coronel Castillo in the municipalities of Landa de Matamoros and Jalpan de Serra in Querétaro state and in adjacent San Luis Potosí state. The species' estimated extent of occurrence (EOO) is 180 km^{2} in up to three locations.

It is native to cloud forests between 1,500 and 1,800 meters elevation. At La Joya del Hielo it grows in cloud forest with Cupressus lusitanica, Magnolia rzedowskiana, and Taxus globosa. At La Mesa it grows with species of Abies, Quercus, Liquidambar, Pinus, Tilia, and Podocarpus.

== Conservation ==
Magnolia pedrazae is subject to habitat loss and degradation from timber extraction and expansion of livestock pasture. Its known populations are within the Sierra Gorda Biosphere Reserve protected area. The species' conservation status is assessed as endangered.
