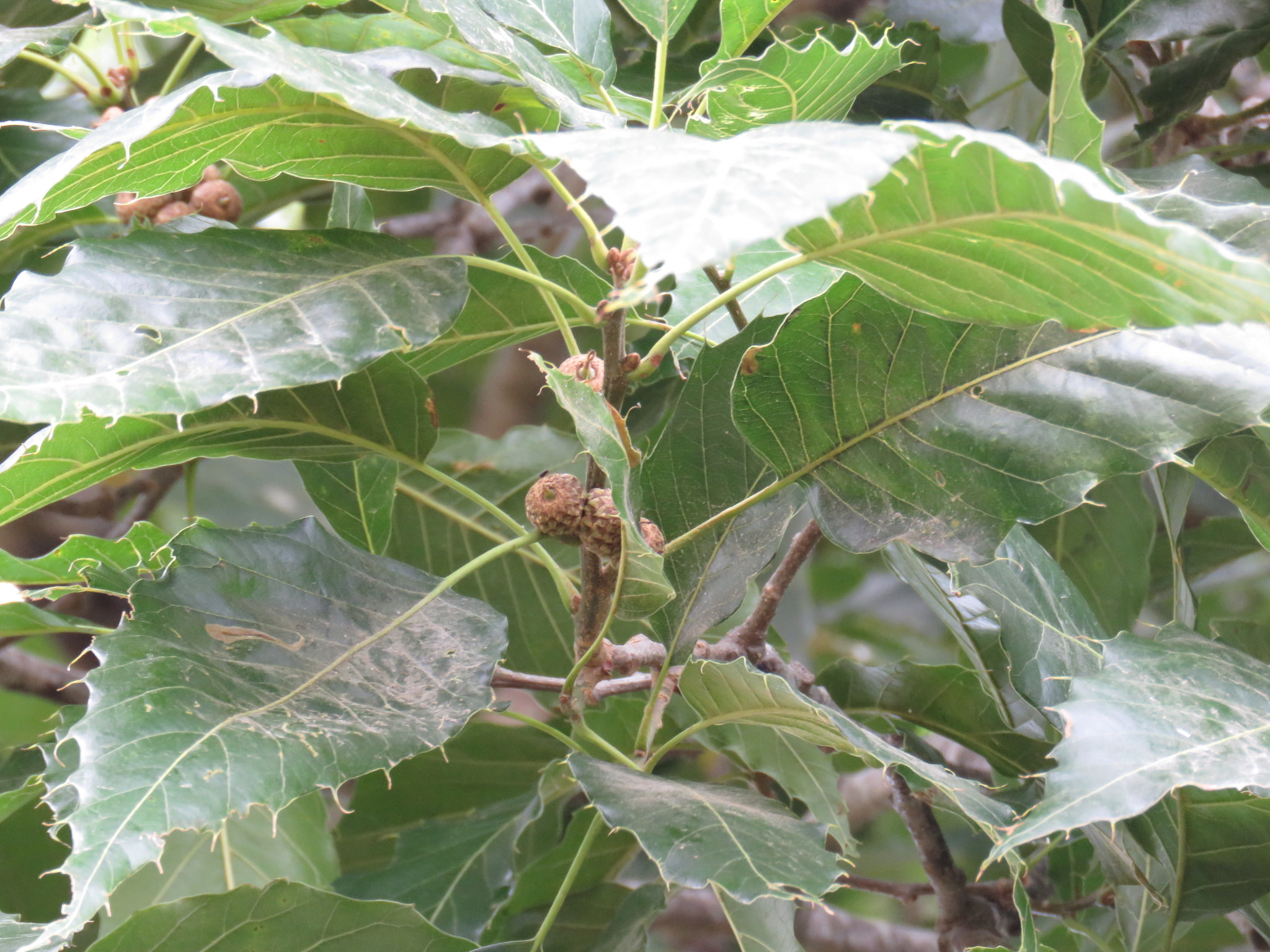
- Quercus uxoris in Zapotitlán de Vadillo, Mexico

Conservation status
- Least Concern (IUCN 3.1)

Scientific classification
- Kingdom: Plantae
- Clade: Embryophytes
- Clade: Tracheophytes
- Clade: Spermatophytes
- Clade: Angiosperms
- Clade: Eudicots
- Clade: Rosids
- Order: Fagales
- Family: Fagaceae
- Genus: Quercus
- Subgenus: Quercus subg. Quercus
- Section: Quercus sect. Lobatae
- Species: Q. uxoris

Binomial name
- Quercus uxoris McVaugh

= Quercus uxoris =

Species of oak tree

Quercus uxoris is an uncommon species of oak.

The tree is endemic to Mexico. It has been found in the states of Jalisco, Colima, Guerrero, Michoacán, and Oaxaca in southern Mexico.

== Description ==
Quercus uxoris is a large deciduous tree up to 25 metres (82 feet) tall with a trunk often more than 100 centimetres (39 inches) in diameter.

The leaves can be as much as 26 cm (10 in) long, thick and leathery, broadly lance-shaped with numerous tapering teeth along the edges.

== Range and habitat ==
Quercus uxoris is native to the mountains of southern Mexico, mostly in the Sierra Madre del Sur, with small outlier populations in the Chiapas Highlands and Sierra Madre de Chiapas of Chiapas in southeastern Mexico, and in the Sierra de Taxco and near Valle de Bravo in the Trans-Mexican Volcanic Belt of central Mexico. It is found in the states of Jalisco, Colima, Michoacán, Guerrero, Oaxaca, and Chiapas. Although it has a large range, its distribution is highly discontinuous.

It grows mostly in humid cloud forest pockets from 1,800 to 2,100 meters elevation, and occasionally in humid locations, like ravines and stream valleys, in oak forest, pine–oak forest, mountain mesophyll forest, deciduous tropical forest, and tropical sub-deciduous forest habitats. It prefers deep soils rich in organic matter.

Its populations are generally small, but it can be a dominant canopy tree under favorable conditions.

== Conservation and threats ==
The species is subject to habitat loss from deforestation. Its native cloud forests and other humid forests are exploited for timber, and are cleared for conversion to livestock pasture and agriculture, including coffee.

A population of the species in the montane mesophyll forest of Ojo de Agua del Cuervo, in Talpa de Allende municipality of Jalisco, is threatened by deforestation, illegal logging, and road-building which fragments habitat blocks.
