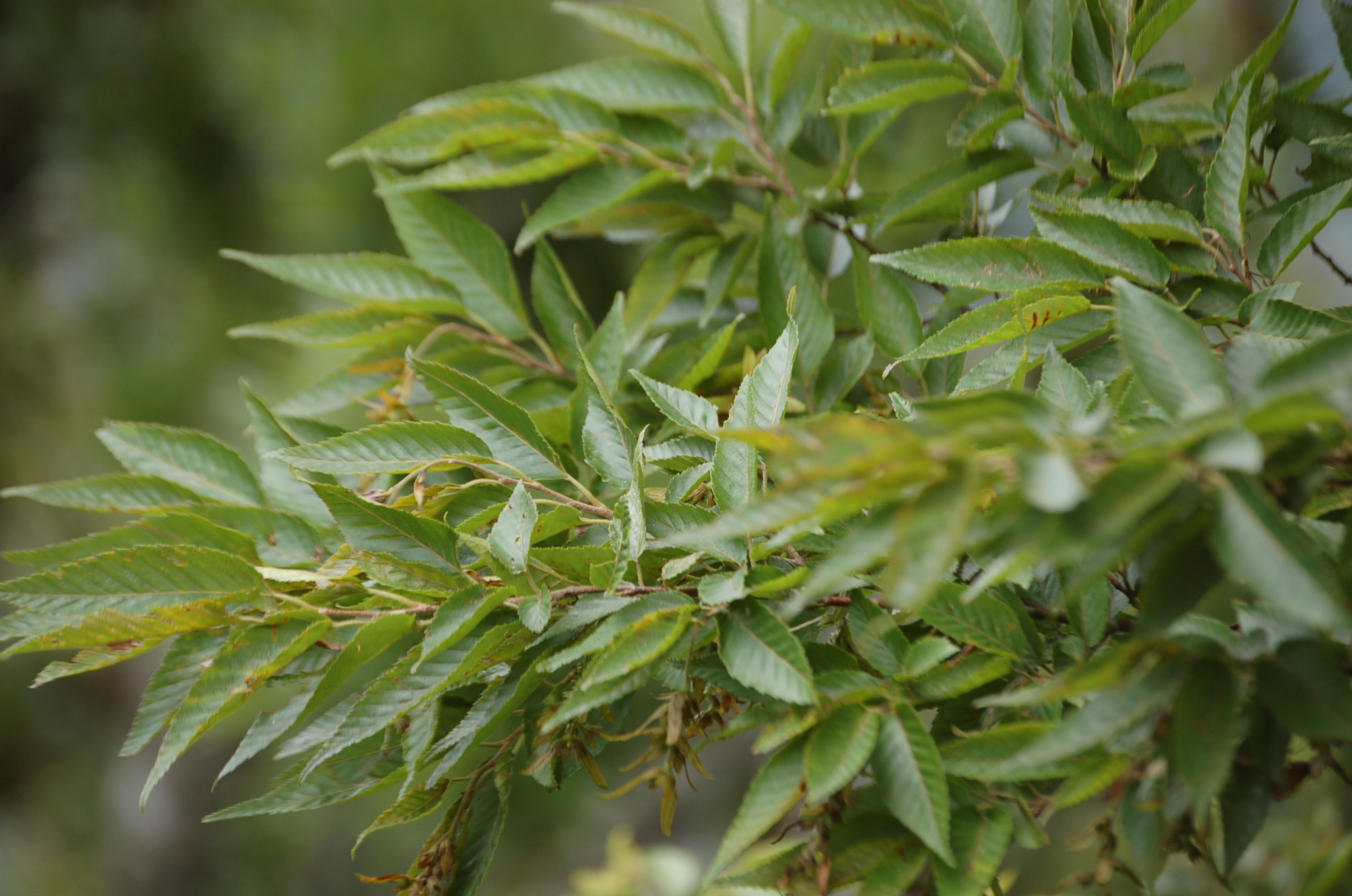

Conservation status
- Least Concern (IUCN 3.1)

Scientific classification
- Kingdom: Plantae
- Clade: Tracheophytes
- Clade: Angiosperms
- Clade: Eudicots
- Clade: Rosids
- Order: Fagales
- Family: Betulaceae
- Genus: Carpinus
- Species: C. tropicalis

Binomial name
- Carpinus tropicalis (Donn.Sm.) Lundell (1939)

Subspecies
- Carpinus tropicalis subsp. mexicana Furlow; Carpinus tropicalis subsp. tropicalis

Synonyms
- Carpinus americanus var. tropicalis Donn.Sm. (1890); Carpinus caroliniana var. tropicalis (Donn.Sm.) Standl. (1920); Carpinus tropicales (Donn.Sm.) Lundell [orth. error]

= Carpinus tropicalis =

Species of tree

Carpinus tropicalis is a species of tree native to central and southern Mexico, Guatemala, El Salvador, Honduras, and Nicaragua.

== Description ==
Carpinus tropicalis is small to medium-sized tree which grows up to 30 m (98 ft) tall, with a trunk up to 100 cm (39 in) in diameter.

== Range and habitat ==
In Mexico it is found in scattered locations in the Sierra Madre Oriental, Trans-Mexican Volcanic Belt, Sierra Madre de Oaxaca, southern Sierra Madre Occidental, Sierra Madre del Sur, Chiapas Highlands, and Sierra Madre de Chiapas. It is also found in the highlands of Guatemala, El Salvador, Honduras, and Nicaragua.

It is characteristic cloud forest tree, and is also found in oak, pine–oak, and pine forests, between 1,000 and 2,700 meters elevation.

== Subspecies ==
Two subspecies are accepted:

- Carpinus tropicalis subsp. mexicana Furlow – northeastern, central, and southwestern Mexico
- Carpinus tropicalis subsp. tropicalis – northeastern Mexico to Nicaragua
