= Magnolia guerrerensis =

Conservation status
- Endangered (IUCN 3.1)

Scientific classification
- Kingdom: Plantae
- Clade: Embryophytes
- Clade: Tracheophytes
- Clade: Spermatophytes
- Clade: Angiosperms
- Clade: Magnoliids
- Order: Magnoliales
- Family: Magnoliaceae
- Genus: Magnolia
- Section: Magnolia sect. Magnolia
- Species: M. guerrerensis

Binomial name
- Magnolia guerrerensis J.Jiménez Ram., K.Vega & Cruz

Species of tree

Magnolia guerrerensis is a species of flowering plant in the family Magnoliaceae. It is endemic to the Sierra Madre del Sur of Guerrero state in southern Mexico.

== Description ==
Magnolia guerrerensis is a tree that grows between 6 and 20 meters tall at maturity. It flowers in March, May, July, and August and fruits in May.

The species was classed as Magnolia schiedeana, which is native to the Sierra Madre Oriental, until being recognized as a distinct species.

== Range and habitat ==
Magnolia guerrerensis is endemic to central Sierra Madre del Sur of Guerrero state in southern Mexico, where it is found in the municipalities of Leonardo Bravo, General Heliodoro Castillo, and Quechultenango. The species' estimated extent of occurrence (EOO) is less than 4,000 km^{2}.

Magnolia guerrerensis grows in montane cloud forests, from 1,950 to 2,400 meters elevation. It grows in soils with abundant leaf litter, in association with species of pine, oak, Persea, and Clethra.

== Conservation ==
Magnolia guerrerensis has a small range, and a decreasing population. It is threatened with habitat loss from excessive timber harvesting and conversion of forest lands to agriculture and livestock pasture. The species' conservation status is assessed as endangered.
