= General Juan N. Álvarez National Park =

National park and protected area in Guerrero, Mexico

- IUCN category II (national park)
- Location within Mexico
- Interactive map of General Juan N. Álvarez National Park
- Location: Guerrero, Mexico
- Nearest city: Guerrero
- Coordinates: 17.600°N 99.082°W
- Area: 5.28 square kilometres (528 ha)
- Established: 1964
- Governing body: National Commission of Natural Protected Areas

General Juan N. Álvarez National Park is a national park and protected area located in Guerrero, Mexico. The park was established in 1964 and covers approximately 5.28 square kilometres (2.04 mi^{2}). The area is named after Juan Álvarez, a Mexican general and former president of Mexico.

The decree for the creation of this national park was issued on May 14, 1964, by the then president of the republic Adolfo López Mateos.

== Geography ==
The park occupies part of the mountain range called the Sierra Madre del Sur, located northwest of the city of Chilapa de Álvarez. These elevations are known as El Ocotal, with altitudes up to 2,500 m asl.

Some ravines that feed the tributaries of the rivers near park in turn feed the Atzacualoya River, which belongs to the homonymous basin, and which is a tributary of the Mezcala River, which in turn is a tributary of the Balsas River.

== Biodiversity ==
According to the National Information System on Biodiversity of the National Commission for the Knowledge and Use of Biodiversity (CONABIO), in the General Juan Álvarez National Park there are more than 15 species of plants and animals, of which 1 is within some category. risk of the Official Mexican Standard NOM-059.

=== Flora ===
In general, the flora that exists in this national park and that can be seen throughout this place is made up of pine and oak forests, some of which have been introduced as a measure taken for the reforestation process of the place. Even in the lower parts you can find areas of grasslands. Other species that can be observed are orchids, which are highly endangered in the area.

=== Fauna ===
In the park species of wild cat, skunk, coyote, opossum, rabbit, raccoon, fox, ocelot, badger and cacomistle among others has been observed.
