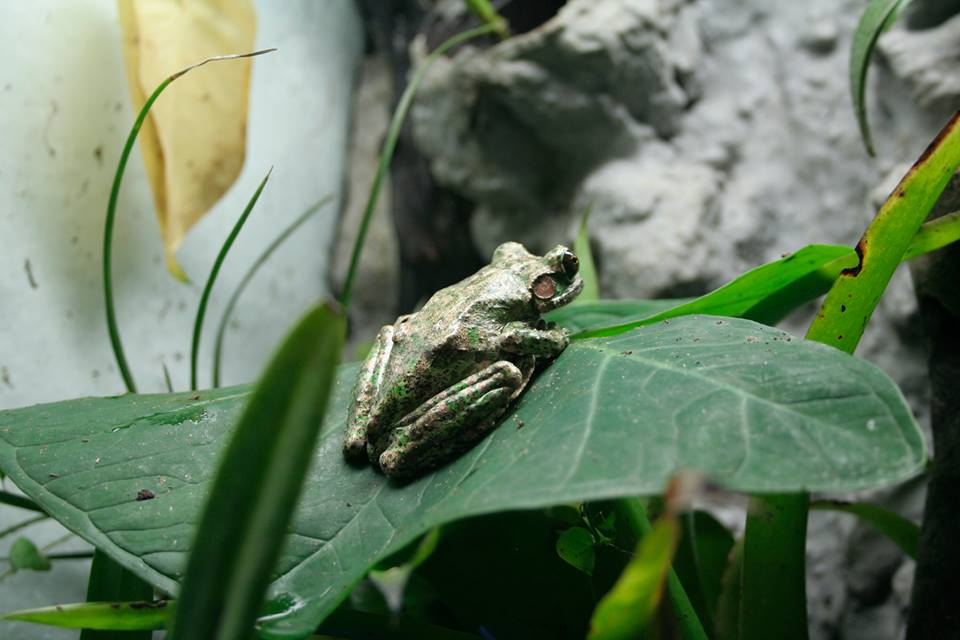

Conservation status
- Vulnerable (IUCN 3.1)

Scientific classification
- Kingdom: Animalia
- Phylum: Chordata
- Class: Amphibia
- Order: Anura
- Family: Hylidae
- Genus: Charadrahyla
- Species: C. chaneque

Binomial name
- Charadrahyla chaneque (Duellman, 1961)

= Fairy tree frog =

Species of amphibian

The fairy tree frog (Charadrahyla chaneque) is a species of frog in the family Hylidae endemic to Mexico. Its natural habitats are subtropical or tropical moist lowland forests, subtropical or tropical moist montane forests, and rivers. It is threatened by habitat loss.
