= Charadrahyla juanitae =

Conservation status
- Near Threatened (IUCN 3.1)

Scientific classification
- Kingdom: Animalia
- Phylum: Chordata
- Class: Amphibia
- Order: Anura
- Family: Hylidae
- Genus: Charadrahyla
- Species: C. juanitae

Binomial name
- Charadrahyla juanitae (Snyder, 1972)

Synonyms
- Exerodonta juanitae (Snyder, 1972)

Species of frog

Charadrahyla juanitae is a species of frog in the family Hylidae. It is endemic to Mexico. Its natural habitats are subtropical or tropical moist lowland forests, subtropical or tropical moist montane forests, and intermittent rivers. It is threatened by habitat loss.
