= Zicuirán-Infiernillo Biosphere Reserve =

Reserve in Mexico

- IUCN category VI (protected area with sustainable use of natural resources)
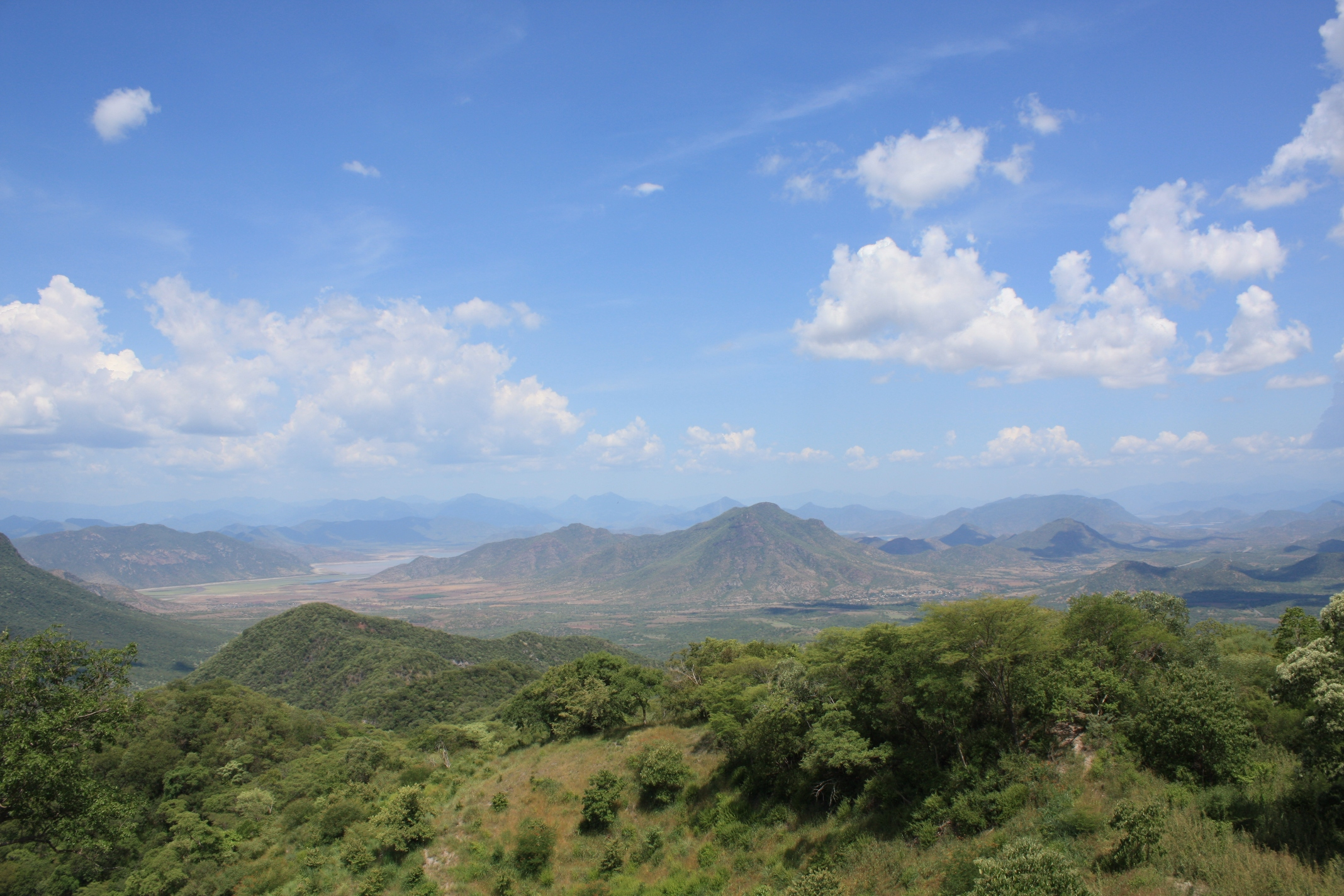
- view of the reserve from the foothills of Cerro Condémbaro
- Interactive map of Zicuirán-Infiernillo Biosphere Reserve
- Location: Michoacán, Mexico
- Coordinates: 18.8468°N 102.0042°W
- Area: 2,651.18 km^{2} (1,023.63 sq mi)
- Designation: biosphere reserve
- Designated: 30 November 2007
- Governing body: National Commission of Natural Protected Areas

Zicuirán-Infiernillo Biosphere Reserve is a biosphere reserve in western Mexico. It covers 2,651.18 km^{2} (1,023.63 sq mi) of the Sierra Madre del Sur range in the state of Michoacán, west of the Balsas River.
