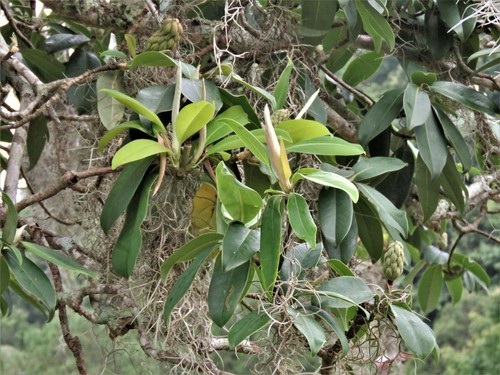

Conservation status
- Endangered (IUCN 3.1)

Scientific classification
- Kingdom: Plantae
- Clade: Embryophytes
- Clade: Tracheophytes
- Clade: Spermatophytes
- Clade: Angiosperms
- Clade: Magnoliids
- Order: Magnoliales
- Family: Magnoliaceae
- Genus: Magnolia
- Section: Magnolia sect. Magnolia
- Species: M. tamaulipana

Binomial name
- Magnolia tamaulipana A.Vázquez

= Magnolia tamaulipana =

Species of flowering plant

Magnolia tamaulipana is a species of flowering plant in the family Magnoliaceae. It is a tree endemic to Tamaulipas and Nuevo León in northeastern Mexico.

== Range and habitat ==
Magnolia tamaulipana is native to the Sierra Madre Oriental of Nuevo León and Tamaulipas states. It is known from only five locations, all within El Cielo Biosphere Reserve. The potential forest distribution for the species is estimated at 2,458 km^{2}.

It inhabits montane cloud forests between 1,180 and 1,500 meters elevation.

== Ecology ==
Magnolia tamaulipana is pollinated by beetles, including two species of the scarab beetles Cyclocephala and other beetles in family Staphylinidae. The plants produce large protogynous flowers which are viable for up to 24 hours. The flowers are thermogenic, and the heat produced dissipates the flower scent to attract pollinating beetles.

== Conservation ==
Most of the species' range is within the El Cielo Biosphere Reserve. The species' population is in decline across its native range, despite living within a protected area. The causes of its population decline aren't well understood, but a study of the effects of hurricanes in the region indicated that hurricanes uproot and damage many mature trees, and the species may have lower regeneration capacity than other cloud forest trees. Other factors causing the population decline may include loss of habitat from deforestation and urbanization. The species conservation status is assessed as endangered.
