= Boquerón de Tonalá Flora and Fauna Protection Area =

Protected area in Oaxaca, Mexico

- IUCN category VI (protected area with sustainable use of natural resources)
- Location: Oaxaca, Mexico
- Area: 39.12 km^{2} (15.10 sq mi)
- Designation: flora and fauna protection area
- Designated: 2008

Boquerón de Tonalá Flora and Fauna Protection Area is a protected natural area in southern Mexico. It is located in the Sierra Madre del Sur ranges in the state of Oaxaca.

== Flora and fauna ==
According to the National Biodiversity Information System of Comisión Nacional para el Conocimiento y Uso de la Biodiversidad (CONABIO) in Boquerón de Tonalá Flora and Fauna Protection Area there are over 690 plant and animal species from which 25 are in at risk category and 8 are exotics.
