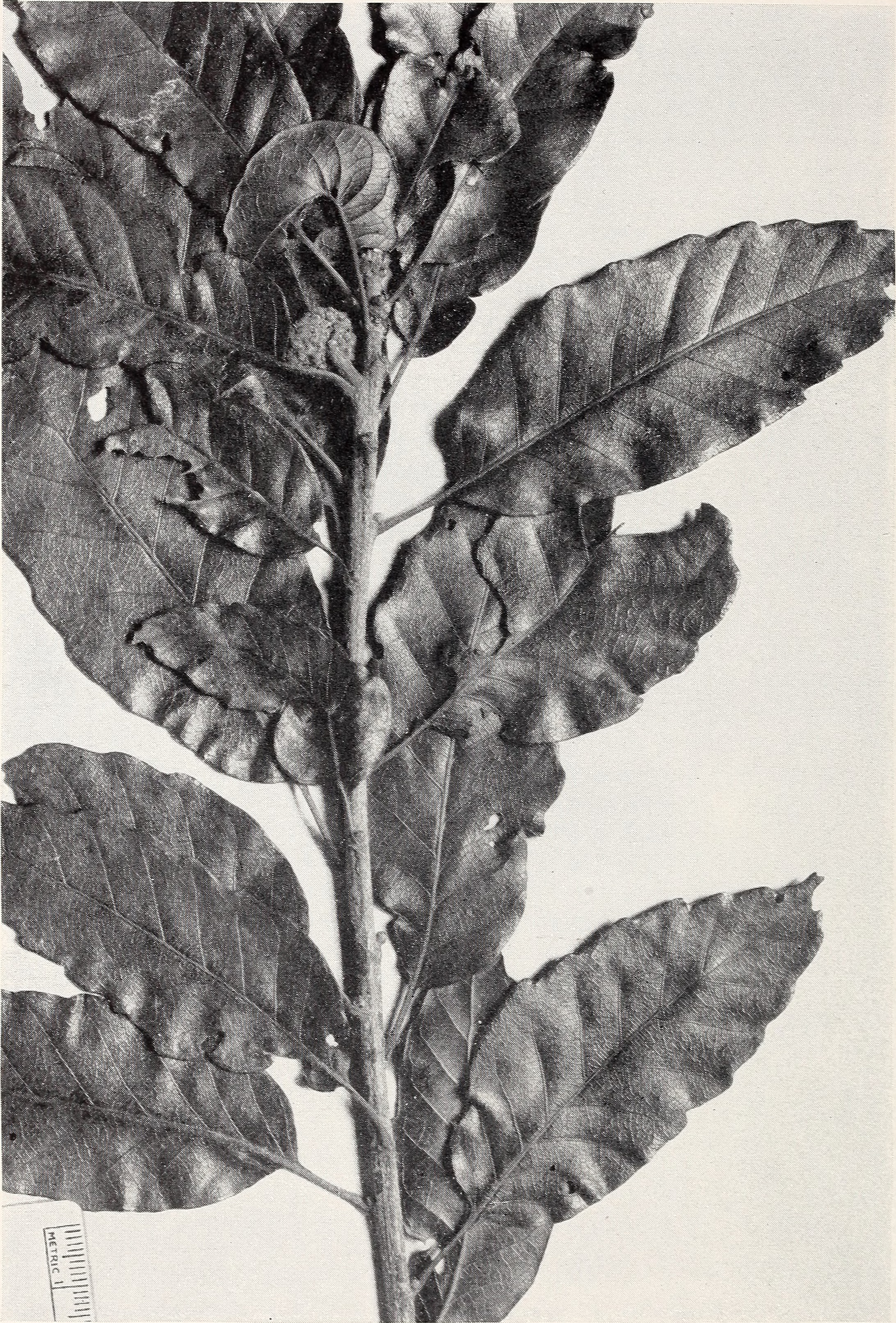
- Herbarium specimen of Quercus corrugata

Conservation status
- Least Concern (IUCN 3.1)

Scientific classification
- Kingdom: Plantae
- Clade: Tracheophytes
- Clade: Angiosperms
- Clade: Eudicots
- Clade: Rosids
- Order: Fagales
- Family: Fagaceae
- Genus: Quercus
- Subgenus: Quercus subg. Quercus
- Section: Quercus sect. Quercus
- Species: Q. corrugata

Binomial name
- Quercus corrugata Hook.

Synonyms
- Quercus aaata C.H.Mull.; Quercus boqueronae Trel.; Quercus corrugata var. granulifera Trel.; Quercus corrugata var. ipalensis Trel.; Quercus corrugata var. microcarpa Wenz.; Quercus cyclobalanoides Trel.; Quercus excelsa Liebm.; Quercus insignis subsp. pilarius (Trel.) A.E.Murray; Quercus insignis var. pilarius (Trel.) A.E.Murray; Quercus molinae C.H.Mull.; Quercus ovandensis Matuda; Quercus pilarius Trel.; Quercus pilgeriana Seemen; Quercus reevesii Trel.; Quercus yousei Trel.

= Quercus corrugata =

Species of oak tree

Quercus corrugata is a species of oak found in Central America and Mexico.

== Description ==
Quercus corrugata is a large deciduous tree, growing up to 60 meters tall. It has long straight trunk which can reach 2.5 meters in diameter. It has very large acorns, which are produced in large quantities during episodic mast-seeding events.

== Range and habitat ==
Quercus corrugata ranges from southern Mexico through Central America to western Panama.

In Mexico it is found in the southern Sierra Madre Oriental of Hidalgo, Veracruz, and Puebla states through the Sierra Madre de Oaxaca, Sierra de los Tuxtlas, Chiapas Highlands, and Sierra Madre de Chiapas. In Central America it is found in the Sierra Madre de Chiapas of Guatemala and El Salvador, the Guatemalan Highlands, the Maya Mountains of Belize, the Chortis Highlands of Honduras and Nicaragua, and the Cordillera de Talamanca of Costa Rica and western Panama.

It inhabits humid montane cloud forests between 700 and 2,200 meters elevation.
