= Magnolia faustinomirandae =

Conservation status
- Critically Endangered (IUCN 3.1)

Scientific classification
- Kingdom: Plantae
- Clade: Embryophytes
- Clade: Tracheophytes
- Clade: Spermatophytes
- Clade: Angiosperms
- Clade: Magnoliids
- Order: Magnoliales
- Family: Magnoliaceae
- Genus: Magnolia
- Section: Magnolia sect. Magnolia
- Species: M. faustinomirandae

Binomial name
- Magnolia faustinomirandae A.Vázquez

Species of tree

Magnolia faustinomirandae is a species of tree endemic to the Chiapas Highlands of Chiapas, Mexico.

== Range and habitat ==
Magnolia faustinomirandae is found only in the municipality of Jitotol, Chiapas. Its known extent of occurrence (EOO) is less than 100 km^{2}.

It grows in open cloud forests at 1600 meters elevation, with species of pine and oak, Liquidambar styraciflua, Nyssa sylvatica, and Brunellia mexicana.

== Conservation ==
The species' conservation status is assessed as critically endangered. Its cloud forest habitat has been severely fragmented and degraded by deforestation over the past two decades.
