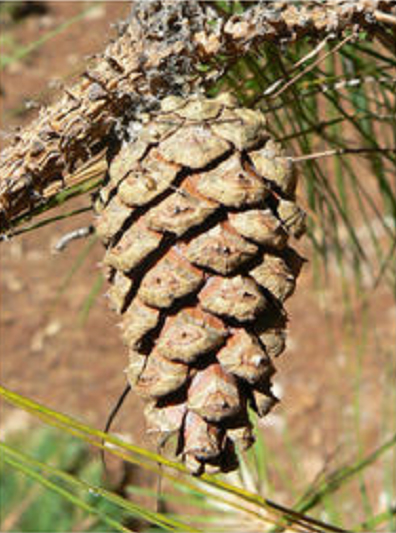

Conservation status
- Least Concern (IUCN 3.1)

Scientific classification
- Kingdom: Plantae
- Clade: Tracheophytes
- Clade: Gymnosperms
- Division: Pinophyta
- Class: Pinopsida
- Order: Pinales
- Family: Pinaceae
- Genus: Pinus
- Subgenus: P. subg. Pinus
- Section: P. sect. Trifoliae
- Subsection: P. subsect. Australes
- Species: P. herrerae

Binomial name
- Pinus herrerae Martínez

= Pinus herrerae =

Herrera's pine

Species of conifer

Pinus herrerae, Herrera's pine, is a species of conifer in the family Pinaceae. It is a pine endemic to Mexico. It is a straight trunked tree, 30–35 m tall and 75–100 cm dbh (diameter at breast height).

Bark: thick, reddish-brown or gray -brown. Twigs: In light gray with bases decurrent long cord. Needles: Green Color, in fascicles of 3, 10 to 20 cm in length; and 0.7 to 0.9 mm thin and lax wide. Cones: Solitary or in pairs 2-4x2-3.5 cm when open, dropping the year they mature. Scales: 50–80, opening soon, apófisis slightly raised with small umbo and mucronate. Seeds: 2.5-4x2-3 mm with wing 5-8x35 mm. Habitat: On the fringe of the cloud forest and pine and pine-oak growing beside Pseudotsuga .
