= Reptiles of the Sierra de Manantlán Biosphere Reserve =

This page contains lists of reptiles found in the Sierra de Manantlán Biosphere Reserve, which straddles the states of Colima and Jalisco in Mexico. The reserve is located in the transition of the Nearctic and Neotropical realms and encompasses parts of the Sierra Madre del Sur, with a wide range of altitudes, climates and soils. The effects of tectonic and volcanic activities and erosion are notable within the reserve.

Forest types in the reserve including mesophytic, cloud, and dry deciduous and semi-deciduous tropical forests. Anthropologists know the region as Zona de Occidente, an area notably different from the rest of Mesoamerica. Some ceramic remnants, figurines and graves have been found, but there is little other material evidence of habitation. As of 1995 almost 8,000 people lived in the Reserva de la Biosfera Manantlan, engaged mainly in agriculture (corn, beans, tomatoes, sugar cane, watermelon, mangoes), livestock grazing, timber production, and extraction of wood for fuel and mining of coal or minerals. Another 30,000 lived in the surrounding communities and almost 700,000 in the surrounding region of influence.

Ecological characteristics

The Reserva de la Biosfera Manantlan is located to the extreme north of the inter-tropical zone. The climate in the region is influenced by various factors in addition to its latitude, such as its proximity to the coast, the effect of its landform – orographic shade – and the breadth of the altitudinal range, which partly goes to explain the high regional biodiversity and the presence of numerous plant formations ranging from tropical forests to those of temperate-cold climates.

The Reserva de la Biosfera Manantlan's varied and complex plant cover harbours a great wealth of flora. There are over 2900 species of vascular plants belonging to 981 genera. Wildlife is one of the important components of the high biodiversity in this reserve. Among the main values of the Reserva de la Biosfera Manantlan, in addition to its great wealth of species and its unique biogeographical characteristics, particular mention should be made of the presence of endangered or useful endemic species. So far 110 species of mammals have been reported, among which the Mexican vole Microtus mexicanus neveriae and the pocket gopher Cratogeomys gymnurus russelli, in addition to other mammals such as the oncilla, the jaguarandi, the ocelot, the puma, the bobcat, the jaguar and four species of nectarivorous bats.

Three hundred and thirty-six species of birds have been reported, among them 36 which are endemic to Mexico, such as the charismatic species: the crested guan (Penelope purpurascens), the military macaw (Ara militaris), the red-lored amazon (Amazona autumnalis) and the Mexican national symbol, the golden eagle. In terms of herpetofauna, 85 species have been recorded; of these it is known that 13 are endemic to the western and central region of Mexico: the rattlesnake, the black iguana, the frog Shyrrhopus modestus, the beaded lizard Heloderma horridum and the Autlan rattlesnake (Crotalus lannomi), an endemic species only reported for the area of Puerto de Los Mazos. Of the 16 species of fish identified, 13 are native and four are endemic to the region.

Names were collected by reserve staff and checked against local collections and resources such as Naturalista.

== Testudines or turtles ==
=== Emydidae ===
==== Trachemys ====
- Trachemys scripta: pond slider, Spanish: tortuga pinta

=== Geoemydidae ===
==== Rhinoclemmys ====
- Rhinoclemmys pulcherrima: painted wood turtle, tortuga pinta

=== Kinosternidae ===
==== Kinosternon ====
- Kinosternon integrum: casquito de burro, pecho quebrada

== Sauria or lizards ==
=== Anguidae ===
==== Barisia ====
- Barisia imbricata: falso escorpion

==== Elgaria ====
- Elgaria kingii: lagartija, lagarto de montaña, escorpion

==== Gerrhonotus ====
- Gerrhonotus liocephalus: culebra con patas

=== Corytophanidae ===
==== Basiliscus ====
- Basiliscus vittatus: basilisco rayado

=== Eublepharidae ===
==== Coleonyx ====
- Coleonyx elegans: cuija manchado, besucona

=== Phyllodactylidae or Gekkonidae ===
==== Phyllodactylus ====
- Phyllodactylus davisi: salamanquesa de Davis
- Phyllodactylus lanei: pata de res

=== Helodermatidae ===
==== Heloderma ====
- Heloderma horridum: salamanquesa de Davis, monstro de Gila, escorpion

=== Iguanidae ===
==== Ctenosaura ====
- Ctenosaura pectinata: iguana negra de roca

==== Iguana ====
- Iguana iguana: iguana verde

=== Phrynosomatidae ===
==== Phrynosoma ====
- Phrynosoma asio: lagarto espinosa, lagartijo

==== Sceloporus ====
- Sceloporus adleri: lagarto-escamosa de Boulenger, rono
- Sceloporus bulleri: lagarto-escamosa de Buller, rono collarejo
- Sceloporus grammicus: mesquite lizard, spiny graphic lizard, chintete de mezquite, rono, lagartijos
- Sceloporus heterolepis: lagarto-escamosa dorso carinado, rono
- Sceloporus horridus: rono espinosa
- Sceloporus melanorhinus: rono de arbol
- Sceloporus pyrocephalus: lagartija-espinosa de pedregal, rono
- Sceloporus scalaris: bunch grass lizard, lagartija de pastizal, cuija
- Sceloporus siniferus: lagartija-escamosa castano, cuija
- Sceloporus torquatus: rapido barrado, rono
- Sceloporus utiformis: rono de suelo, cuija

==== Urosaurus ====
- Urosaurus bicarinatus: tree or brush lizard, ronito

=== Dactyloidae ===
==== Norops or Anolis ====
- Norops nebulosus: panuelo

=== Scincidae ===
==== Mabuya ====
- Mabuya brachypoda: lagartija de hojarasca

==== Eumeces or Plestiodon ====
- Eumeces brevirostris: alicante
- Eumeces colimensis: alicante
- Eumeces parvulus: alicante

=== Teiidae ===
==== Ameiva ====
- Ameiva undulata: whiptail, lagarto metalico

==== Cnemidophorus ====
- Cnemidophorus communis: whiptail, lagarto metalico
- Cnemidophorus costatus: whiptail, huico llanera
- Cnemidophorus deppii: whiptail, lagartija rayada de panzanegra
- Cnemidophorus lineatissimus: whiptail, cuije de muchas linea
- Cnemidophorus sackii: whiptail, campeche

== Serpentes or snakes ==
=== Boidae ===
==== Boa ====
- Boa constrictor: boa constrictor, boa, ilmacoa, malcoa

=== Colubridae ===
==== Masticophis ====
- Masticophis mentovarius: whipsnake, chirionera

==== Conopsis ====
- Conopsis biserialis: two lined ground snake, here
- Conopsis nasus: grey snake

==== Drymarchon ====
- Drymarchon melanurus: black tailed snake, tilcuate, palancacoate

==== Drymobius ====
- Drymobius margaritiferus: corredora de petatillos, corredora moteada

==== Gyalopion ====
- Gyalopion canum: western hook nosed snake, nariz de gancho occidental, culebra de naricilla occidental

==== Lampropeltis ====
- Lampropeltis triangulum: false coral snake, falsa coralillo

==== Dryadophis or Mastigodryas ====
- Dryadophis melanolomus: salmon-bellied racer, culebra lagartijera

==== Oxybelis ====
- Oxybelis aeneus: culebra bejuquilla mexicana

==== Pituophis ====
- Pituophis deppei: culebra sorda mexicana, cincuate mexicana

==== Pseudoficimia ====
- Pseudoficimia frontalis: culebra ilamacoa

==== Rhinocheilus ====
- Rhinocheilus lecontei: culebra de nariz larga

==== Salvadora ====
- Salvadora mexicana: culebra nariz de parche mexicana

==== Coluber or Senticolis ====
- Coluber triaspis: green rat snake, culebra ratonera oliva

==== Sonora ====
- Sonora michoacanensis: Michoacán ground snake, culebra de tierra de Michoacán

==== Tantilla ====
- Tantilla bocourti: culebra encapuchada
- Tantilla calamarina: culebra ciempiés del litoral del Pacífico

==== Trimorphodon ====
- Trimorphodon biscutatus: culebra lira
- Trimorphodon tau: Mexican false nauyaca, falsa nauyaca mexicana

=== Crotalidae or Viperidae\Crotalinae: pit vipers ===
==== Agkistrodon ====
- Agkistrodon bilineatus: pichicuata, zolcuate, gamarilla

==== Crotalus: rattlesnakes, cascabel ====
- Crotalus basiliscus: Pacific rattlesnake, cascabel del Pacífico, vibora de cascabel, saye
- Crotalus lannomi: Autlan rattlesnake, cascabel de Autlán
- Crotalus triseriatus: Transvolcanic rattlesnake, víbora de cascabel Transvolcánica, cascabel oscura de la Sierra Madre

=== Dipsadidae or Colubridae ===
==== Coniophanes ====
- Coniophanes lateritius: stripeless snake, culebra lisa

==== Dipsas ====
- Dipsas gaigeae: falso coralillo, zicatlinán, caracolera

==== Enulius ====
- Enulius flavitorques: culebra coluda del Pacífico,

==== Geophis ====
- Geophis bicolor: culebra minera del altiplano
- Geophis dugesii: minadora de Dugès
- Geophis nigrocinctus: minadora de la sierra de Coalcoman
- Geophis petersii: minadora de Peters

==== Hypsiglena ====
- Hypsiglena torquata: culebra nocturna

==== Imantodes ====
- Imantodes gemmistratus: culebra cordelilla centroamericana

==== Leptodeira ====
- Leptodeira annulata: culebra ojo de gato bandada, escombrera
- Leptodeira maculata: escombrera del suroeste mexicano
- Leptodeira splendida: escombrera ojo de gato

==== Pseudoleptodeira ====
- Pseudoleptodeira latifasciata: culebra de cabeza roja

==== Coniophanes ====
- Rhadinaea hesperia: culebra rayada occidental
- Rhadinaea laureata: hojarasquera corona
- Rhadinaea taeniata: hojarasquera rayada de conífera

==== Sibon ====
- Sibon annulifera: caracolera occidental
- Sibon nebulatus: culebra jaspeada
- Sibon philippi: caracolera de Philippi
- Sibon sartorii: caracolera terrestre

=== Elapidae: coral snakes ===
==== Micrurus ====
- Micrurus distans: western Mexican coral snake, serpiente coralillo del occidente mexicano
- Micrurus laticollaris: coralillo del Balsas
- Micrurus proximans: Nayarit coral snake, coralillo nayarita

=== Leptotyphlopidae ===
==== Leptotyphlops or Rena ====
- Leptotyphlops humilis: culebrilla ciega de occidente

=== Loxocemidae ===
==== Loxocemus or Rena ====
- Loxocemus bicolor

=== Natricidae or Colubridae ===
==== Storeria ====
- Storeria storerioides: culebra parda mexicana

==== Thamnophis ====
- Thamnophis cyrtopsis: culebra lineada de bosque
- Thamnophis eques: Mexican wandering water snake, culebra de agua nómada mexicana

=== Xenodontidae ===
==== Clelia ====
- Clelia scytalina: Mexican snake eater, culebra-viborera mexicana

==== Manolepis ====
- Manolepis putnami: culebra de cabeza-surcada

== See also ==
- Plants of the Sierra de Manantlán Biosphere Reserve
- List of birds of the Sierra de Manantlán Biosphere Reserve
