= List of birds of the Sierra de Manantlán Biosphere Reserve =

This article contains a list of birds found in the Sierra de Manantlán Biosphere Reserve, which straddles the states of Colima and Jalisco in Mexico. The reserve is located in the transition of the Nearctic and Neotropical realms and encompasses parts of the Sierra Madre del Sur, with a wide range of altitudes, climates and soils. The effects of tectonic and volcanic activities and erosion are notable within the reserve.

Forest types in the reserve including mesophytic, cloud, and dry deciduous and semi-deciduous tropical forests. Anthropologists know the region as Zona de Occidente, an area notably different to the rest of Mesoamerica. Some ceramic remnants, figurines and graves have been found, but there is little other material evidence. As of 1995 almost 8,000 people lived in the Reserva de la Biosfera Manantlan, engaged mainly in agriculture (corn, beans, tomatoes, sugar cane, watermelon, mangoes), livestock grazing, timber production, and extraction of wood for fuel and mining of coal or minerals. Another 30,000 lived in the surrounding communities and almost 700,000 in the surrounding region of influence.

Ecological characteristics

The Sierra de Manantlán Biosphere Reserve is located to the extreme north of the Intertropical Convergence Zone. The climate in the region is influenced by various factors in addition to its latitude, such as its proximity to the coast, the effect of its landform – orographic shade – and the breadth of the altitudinal range, which partly goes to explain the high regional biodiversity and the presence of numerous plant formations ranging from tropical forests to those of temperate-cold climates.

The biosphere reserve's varied and complex plant cover harbors a great wealth of flora. There are over 2900 species of vascular plants belonging to 981 genera. Wildlife is one of the important components of the high biodiversity in this reserve. Among the main values of the biosphere reserve, in addition to its great wealth of species and its unique biogeographical characteristics, is the presence of endangered or useful endemic species. So far 110 species of mammals have been reported, among which the Mexican vole Microtus mexicanus neveriae and the pocket gopher Cratogeomys gymnurus russelli, in addition to other mammals such as the oncilla, the jaguarandi, the ocelot, the puma, the bobcat, the jaguar and four species of nectarivorous bats.

Three hundred and thirty-six species of birds have been reported, among them thirty-six which are endemic to Mexico, such as the charismatic species: the crested guan (Penelope purpurascens), the military macaw (Ara militaris), the red-lored amazon (Amazona autumnalis) and the Mexican national symbol, the golden eagle. In terms of herpetofauna, 85 species have been recorded. Of these it is known that 13 are endemic to the western and central region of Mexico: the rattlesnake, the black iguana, the frog Shyrrhopus modestus, the beaded lizard (Heloderma horridum) and the Autlan rattlesnake (Crotalus lannomi), an endemic species only reported for the area of Puerto de Los Mazos. Of the 16 species of fish identified, 13 are native and four are endemic to the region.

== Tinamiformes ==
=== Tinamidae ===
==== Crypturellus or Tinamu ====
- Crypturellus cinnamomeus or Tinamu canela: Spanish: tinamu canelo, thicket tinamou, rufescent tinamou, perdis

== Anseriformes ==
=== Anatidae ===
==== Dendrocygna ====
- Dendrocygna autumnalis: Spanish: pijije ala blanca, black bellied whistling duck

==== Cairina ====
- Cairina moschata ssp. domestica: pato real doméstico, Muscovy duck

==== Anas ====
- Anas americana: pato chalcuán, American wigeon
- Anas cyanoptera: cerceta canela, cinnamon teal
- Anas diazi or Anas platyrhynchos ssp. diazi: pato mexicano, Mexican duck
- Anas discors: cerceta ala azul, blue winged teal

==== Aythya ====
- Aythya affinis: pato boludo-menor, lesser scaup

==== Oxyura ====
- Oxyura jamaicensis: pato tepalcate, ruddy duck

== Galliformes ==
=== Cracidae ===
==== Ortalis ====
- Ortalis poliocephala: Spanish: chachalaca pálida, west Mexican chachalaca

==== Penelope ====
- Penelope purpurascens: pava cojolita, crested guan

=== Odontophoridae ===
==== Colinus ====
- Colinus virginianus: codorniz cotuí, northern bobwhite

==== Cyrtonyx ====
- Cyrtonyx montezumae: codorniz Moctezuma, Montezuma quail

==== Dactylortyx ====
- Dactylortyx thoracicus: codorniz silbadora, tindorinda, singsong quail

==== Dendrortyx ====
- Dendrortyx macroura: codorniz-coluda neovolcánica, gallinita, long tailed wood partridge

==== Philortyx ====
- Philortyx fasciatus: codorniz rayada, banded quail

== Podicipediformes ==
=== Podicipedidae ===
==== Tachybaptus ====
- Tachybaptus dominicus: Spanish: zampullín macacito, zambullidor menor, least grebe

==== Podilymbus ====
- Podilymbus podiceps: zambullidor pico grueso, pied billed grebe

== Pelecaniformes ==
=== Phalacrocoracidae ===
==== Nannopterum ====
- Nannopterum brasilianum: Spanish: cormorán oliváceo, Neotropic cormorant

== Ciconiiformes ==
=== Ardeidae ===
==== Ardea ====
- Ardea alba: Spanish: garza blanca, great white egret
- Ardea herodias: garza morena, great blue heron

==== Botaurus ====
- Botaurus lentiginosus: avetoro norteño, American bittern

==== Bubulcus ====
- Bubulcus ibis: garza ganadera, cattle egret

==== Butorides ====
- Butorides virescens: garceta verde, green heron

==== Egretta ====
- Egretta caerulea: garceta azul, pichichi, little blue heron
- Egretta thula: garceta pie-dorado, snowy egret
- Egretta tricolor: garceta tricolor, tricolored heron

==== Nycticorax ====
- Nycticorax nycticorax: pedrete corona negra, black crowned night heron

=== Ciconiidae ===
==== Mycteria ====
- Mycteria americana: cigüeña americana, la ciguena, wood stork

=== Threskiornithidae ===
==== Plegadis ====
- Plegadis chihi: ibis cara blanca, white faced ibis

== Accipitriformes ==
=== Cathartidae ===
==== Cathartes ====
- Cathartes aura: Spanish: zopilote, aura, turkey vulture

==== Coragyps ====
- Coragyps atratus: zopilote común, zopilote alas blancas, black vulture

=== Accipitridae ===
==== Pandion ====
- Pandion haliaetus: aguilla pescadora, gavilán pescador, osprey

==== Chondrohierax ====
- Chondrohierax uncinatus: gavilan coracolero, gavilán pico gancho, hook-billed kite

==== Elanus ====
- Elanus leucurus: milano cola blanca, white-tailed kite

==== Circus ====
- Circus cyaneus: gavilán rastrero, northern harrier, marsh hawk

==== Accipiter ====
- Accipiter striatus: San Miguilito, gavilán pecho blanco, sharp-shinned hawk
- Accipiter cooperii: gavilán de Cooper, Cooper's hawk
- Accipiter gentilis: gavilán azor, northern goshawk

==== Buteo ====
- Buteo plagiatus: aguililla gris, el busardo gris, gavilán saraviado, grey hawk
- Buteo brachyurus: aguililla cola corto, gavilán rabicorto, short-tailed hawk
- Buteo albonotatus: aguililla zopilota, aguililla aura, aguilucho negro, zone-tailed hawk
- Buteo jamaicensis: aguililla cola roja, red-tailed hawk
- Buteo platypterus: aguililla, halconcillo, aguila ala ancha, gavilán ala ancho, broad-winged hawk

==== Buteo or Rupornis ====
- Buteo magnirostris: aguililla caminera, roadside hawk

==== Buteo or Geranoaetus ====
- Buteo albicaudatus: aguililla cola blanca, gavilán coliblanco, aguilucho alas largas, white-tailed hawk

==== Aquila ====
- Aquila chrysaetos: aguila real, golden eagle

==== Spizaetus ====
- Spizaetus ornatus: aguilla chonguda, aguila elegante, ornate hawk-eagle

==== Harpyhaliaetus or Buteogallus ====
- Harpyhaliaetus solitarius: aguilla negra, aguilla solitario, solitary eagle

==== Geranospiza ====
- Geranospiza caerulescens: gavilán zancón, crane hawk

==== Parabuteo ====
- Parabuteo unicinctus: aguililla rojinegra, Harris's hawk

== Falconiformes ==
=== Falconidae ===
==== Micrastur ====
- Micrastur semitorquatus: Spanish: halcón-selvático de collar, collared forest-falcon

==== Caracara ====
- Caracara plancus: kelele, caracara quebrantahuesos, crested caracara

==== Herpetotheres ====
- Herpetotheres cachinnans: halcón guaco, laughing falcon

==== Falco ====
- Falco sparverius: quiliqui, cernícalo americano, American kestrel
- Falco rufigularis: wauw, halcón eenano, bat falcon
- Falco peregrinus: halcón peregrino, peregrine falcon
- Falco columbarius: halcón esmerejón, merlin

== Gruiformes ==
=== Rallidae ===
==== Porphyrio ====
- Porphyrio martinica: Spanish: gallineta morada, purple gallinule

==== Gallinula ====
- Gallinula chloropus: gallineta frente roja, common moorhen

==== Fulica ====
- Fulica americana: choca, hayno, gallareta americana, American coot

=== Aramidae ===
==== Aramus ====
- Aramus guarauna: carrao, limpkin

== Charadriiformes ==
=== Charadriidae ===
==== Charadrius ====
- Charadrius vociferus: Spanish: chorlo tildío, chorlitejo colirrojo, chorlo gritón, killdeer

=== Recurvirostridae ===
==== Himantopus ====
- Himantopus mexicanus: candelero americano, black-necked stilt

=== Jacanidae ===
==== Jacana ====
- Jacana spinosa: gurupiche, jacana norteña, northern jacana

=== Scolopacidae ===
==== Actitis ====
- Actitis macularia: playero manchado, andarríos maculado, playero alzacolita, spotted sandpiper

== Columbiformes ==
=== Columbidae ===
==== Patagioenas ====
- Patagioenas fasciata: Spanish: juilota bellotera, collareja, paloma de collar, band-tailed pigeon
- Patagioenas flavirostris: huilota morada, paloma piquirroja, paloma morada, red-billed pigeon

==== Zenaida ====
- Zenaida asiatica: huilota alas blancas, la tórtola aliblanca, paloma aliblanca, paloma ala blanca, white-winged dove
- Zenaida macroura: la huilota, tórtola, rabiche, paloma huilota, mourning dove

==== Columbina ====
- Columbina inca: toritos, la tortolita mexicana, tórtola cola larga, Inca dove
- Columbina passerina: torcacita, la tortolita azul, cococha, columbita común, tórtola coquita, common ground-dove
- Columbina talpacoti: tortolita, columbina colorada, cocochita, tórtola rojiza, ruddy ground-dove

==== Leptotila ====
- Leptotila verreauxi: paloma montaraz común, paloma arroyera, white-tipped dove

==== Geotrygon ====
- Geotrygon montana: perdiz cara roja, parirí, paloma-perdiz rojiza, ruddy quail-dove

== Psittaciformes ==
=== Psittacidae ===
==== Aratinga or Eupsittula ====
- Aratinga canicularis: Spanish: aratinga frentinaranja, perico frente naranja, orange-fronted parakeet

==== Aratinga ====
- Ara militaris: guacamaya verde, military macaw

==== Forpus ====
- Forpus cyanopygius: cotorrita mexicana, perico catarina, Mexican blue-rumped parrotlet

==== Amazona ====
- Amazona finschi: loro corona lila, lilac-crowned parrot
- Amazona oratrix: loro cabeza amarilla, yellow-headed parrot

==== Rhynchopsitta ====
- Rhynchopsitta pachyrhyncha: cotorra-serrana occidental, thick-billed parrot

== Cuculiformes ==
=== Cuculidae ===
==== Coccyzus ====
- Coccyzus minor: Spanish: cuclillo manglero, mangrove cuckoo
- Coccyzus erythropthalmus: cuclillo piquinegro, cuclillo pico negro, black-billed cuckoo
- Coccyzus americanus: cuclillo piquigualdo, cuclillo pico amarillo, yellow-billed cuckoo

==== Piaya ====
- Piaya cayana: cuclillo canela, cuclillo ardilla, squirrel cuckoo

==== Geococcyx ====
- Geococcyx velox: correcaminos chico, correcaminos menor, correcaminos tropical, lesser roadrunner

==== Morococcyx ====
- Morococcyx erythropygus: cuclillo terrestre, cuclillo sabanero, lesser ground-cuckoo

==== Crotophaga ====
- Crotophaga sulcirostris: garrapatero pijuy, groove-billed ani

== Strigiformes ==
=== Tytonidae ===
==== Tyto ====
- Tyto furcata: Spanish: lechuza de campanario, lechuza común, lechuza blanca, American barn owl

=== Strigidae ===
==== Otus ====
- Otus flammeolus: tecolote ojo oscuro, flammulated owl

==== Megascops ====
- Megascops guatemalae: autillo guatemalteco, tecolote vermiculado, vermiculated screech-owl
- Megascops trichopsis: autillo bigotudo, tecolote bigotudo, tecolote rítmico, whiskered screech-owl

==== Bubo ====
- Bubo virginianus: búho cornudo, great horned owl

==== Glaucidium ====
- Glaucidium gnoma: tecolote serrano, northern pygmy-owl (mountain)
- Glaucidium brasilianum: tecolote bajeño, ferruginous pygmy-owl
- Glaucidium palmarum: tecolote colimense, Colima pygmy-owl

==== Athene ====
- Athene cunicularia: tecolote llanero, burrowing owl

==== Strix ====
- Strix varia: búho listado, barred owl
- Strix occidentalis: búho manchado, spotted owl
- Strix virgata: búho café, mottled owl

==== Asio ====
- Asio stygius: búho cara oscura, stygian owl
- Asio flammeus: búho cuerno corto, short-eared owl

==== Aegolius ====
- Aegolius acadicus: lechuza norteña, mochuelo cabezón, tecolotito cabezón, tecolote abetero norteño, tecolote afilador, northern saw-whet owl

== Caprimulgiformes ==
=== Caprimulgidae ===
==== Chordeiles ====
- Chordeiles minor: Spanish: chotacabras zumbón, atajacaminos común, añapero yanqui, añapero boreal, common nighthawk
- Chordeiles minor: chordeiles acutipennis, chotacabras menor, lesser nighthawk

==== Nyctidromus ====
- Nyctidromus albicollis: chotacabras pauraque, pauraque
- Nyctiphrynus mcleodii: tapacamino prío, eared poorwill

==== Caprimulgus ====
- Caprimulgus ridgwayi: chotacabras tucuchillo, tapacamino tu-cuchillo, buff-collared nightjar
- Caprimulgus vociferus: caprimulgus vociferus, tapacamino cuerporruín-norteño, northern whippoorwill

=== Nyctibiidae ===
==== Nyctibius ====
- Nyctibius jamaicensis: pecuy, tapacamino, bienparado norteño, northern potoo

== Apodiformes ==
=== Apodidae ===
==== Cypseloides ====
- Cypseloides niger: Spanish: vencejo negro, black swift
- Cypseloides storeri: vencejo frente blanca, whitefronted swift
- Cypseloides cryptus: vencejo barbiblanco, white-chinned swift

==== Streptoprocne ====
- Streptoprocne rutila: vencejo cuello castaño, chestnut-collared swift
- Streptoprocne semicollaris: vencejo nuca blanca, white-naped swift

==== Chaetura ====
- Chaetura vauxi: vencejo de Vaux, Vaux's swift

==== Aeronautes ====
- Aeronautes saxatalis: vencejo gorgiblanco, vencejo pecho blanco, whitethroated swift

==== Panyptila ====
- Panyptila sanctihieronymi: vencejo tijereta mayor, greater swallowtailed swift

=== Trochilidae: hummingbirds or chupa rosas ===
==== Phaethornis ====
- Phaethornis mexicanus or Phaethornis longirostris ssp. mexicanus: ermitaño mexicano, Mexican hermit

==== Colibri ====
- Colibri thalassinus: colibrí orejiazul, colibrí oreja violeta, green violetear

==== Chlorostilbon ====
- Chlorostilbon auriceps: esmeralda mexicana, golden crowned or forktailed emerald

==== Cynanthus ====
- Cynanthus latirostris: colibrí pico ancho, broad-billed hummingbird

==== Thalurania ====
- Thalurania ridgwayi: ninfa mexicana, Mexican woodnymph

==== Hylocharis ====
- Hylocharis leucotis: zafiro oreja blanca, white eared hummingbird

==== Amazilia ====
- Amazilia beryllina: colibrí berilo, amazilia berilina, chuparrosa, berylline hummingbird
- Amazilia rutila: colibrí canela, cinnamon hummingbird

==== Ramosomyia ====
- Ramosomyia violiceps: colibrí corona violeta, violet crowned hummingbird

==== Lampornis ====
- Lampornis amethystinus: colibrí garganta amatista, amethyst throated hummingbird
- Lampornis clemenciae: colibrí garganta azul, colibrí gorjiazul, blue throated hummingbird

==== Eugenes ====
- Eugenes fulgens: colibrí magnífico, magnificent hummingbird

==== Heliomaster ====
- Heliomaster constantii: colibrí picudo, colibrí pochotero, plain capped starthroat

==== Tilmatura ====
- Tilmatura dupontii: colibrí cola pinta, sparkling tailed hummingbird

==== Archilochus ====
- Archilochus colubris: colibrí garganta rubí, ruby throated hummingbird
- Archilochus alexandri: colibrí barba negra, black chinned hummingbird

==== Calothorax ====
- Calothorax lucifer: colibrí horroros, colibrí lucifer, tijereta norteña, Lucifer hummingbird

==== Calypte ====
- Calypte costae: colibrí cabeza violeta, Costa's hummingbird

==== Stellula ====
- Stellula calliope: colibrí garganta rayada, calliope hummingbird

==== Atthis ====
- Atthis heloisa: zumbador mexicano, bumblebee hummingbird

==== Selasphorus ====
- Selasphorus platycercus: zumbador cola ancha, broad tailed hummingbird
- Selasphorus rufus: guicicil, rufous hummingbird
- Selasphorus sasin: zumbador de Allen, Allen's hummingbird

== Trogoniformes ==
=== Trogonidae ===
==== Trogon ====
- Trogon citreolus: Spanish: trogón citrino, citreoline trogon
- Trogon mexicanus: trogón mexicano, mountain trogon
- Trogon elegans: trogón elegante, elegant trogon

==== Euptilotis ====
- Euptilotis neoxenus: trogón orejón, quetzal mexicano, eared trogon, quetzal

== Coraciiformes ==
=== Momotidae ===
==== Momotus ====
- Momotus mexicanus: Spanish: momoto corona café, russet crowned motmot

=== Alcedinidae ===
==== Megaceryle ====
- Megaceryle torquata: martín pescador de collar, ringed kingfisher
- Megaceryle alcyon: martín pescador norteño, belted kingfisher

==== Chloroceryle ====
- Chloroceryle amazona: martín pescador amazónico, Amazon kingfisher
- Chloroceryle americana: martín pescador verde, green kingfisher

== Piciformes ==
=== Picidae ===
==== Momotus ====
- Melanerpes formicivorus: Spanish: carpintero bellotero, acorn woodpecker
- Melanerpes chrysogenys: carpintero enmascarado, golden cheeked woodpecker
- Melanerpes aurifrons: carpintero cheje, golden-fronted woodpecker

==== Sphyrapicus ====
- Sphyrapicus thyroideus: chupasavia oscuro, Williamson's sapsucker
- Sphyrapicus varius: chupasavia maculado, yellow-bellied sapsucker

==== Picoides ====
- Picoides scalaris: carpintero mexicano, ladderbacked woodpecker
- Picoides villosus: carpintero velloso mayor, hairy woodpecker
- Picoides arizonae: carpintero de Arizona, Arizona woodpecker

==== Veniliornis ====
- Veniliornis fumigatus: carpintero café, smoky brown woodpecker

==== Colaptes ====
- Colaptes auricularis: carpintero corona gris, gray crowned woodpecker
- Colaptes auratus: carpintero de pechera, northern (common) flicker

==== Dryocopus ====
- Dryocopus lineatus: carpintero lineado, lineated woodpecker

==== Campephilus ====
- Campephilus guatemalensis: carpintero pico plata, pale billed woodpecker

== Passeriformes ==
=== Dendrocolaptidae ===
==== Sittasomus ====
- Sittasomus griseicapillus: Spanish: trepatroncos oliváceo, olivaceous woodcreeper

==== Xiphorhynchus ====
- Xiphorhynchus flavigaster: trepatroncos bigotudo, ivory billed woodcreeper

==== Lepidocolaptes ====
- Lepidocolaptes leucogaster: trepatroncos escarchado, white striped woodcreeper

=== Grallariidae ===
==== Grallaria ====
- Grallaria guatimalensis: hormiguero cholino escamoso, scaled antpitta

=== Tyrannidae ===
==== Camptostoma ====
- Camptostoma imberbe: mosquero lampiño, northern beardless-tyrannulet

==== Myiopagis ====
- Myiopagis viridicata: elenia verdosa, greenish elaenia

==== Contopus ====
- Contopus cooperi: pibí boreal, olive sided flycatcher
- Contopus pertinax: pibí tengofrío, greater pewee
- Contopus sordidulus: pibí occidental, western wood-pewee

==== Empidonax ====
- Empidonax traillii: mosquero saucero, willow flycatcher
- Empidonax albigularis: mosquero garganta blanca, white-throated flycatcher
- Empidonax minimus: mosquero mínimo, least flycatcher
- Empidonax hammondii: mosquero de Hammond, Hammond's flycatcher
- Empidonax oberholseri: mosquero oscuro, dusky flycatcher
- Empidonax affinis: mosquero pinero, pine flycatcher
- Empidonax difficilis: mosquero californiano, Pacific-slope flycatcher
- Empidonax occidentalis: mosquero barranquerño, cordilleran flycatcher
- Empidonax fulvifrons: mosquero pecho leonado, buff-breasted flycatcher

==== Sayornis ====
- Sayornis nigricans: papamoscas negro, black phoebe
- Sayornis saya: papamoscas llanero, Say's phoebe

==== Pyrocephalus ====
- Pyrocephalus rubinus: mosqueros cardenal, vermilion flycatcher

==== Attila ====
- Attila spadiceus: atila, bright-rumped attila

==== Myiarchus ====
- Myiarchus tuberculifer: papamoscas triste, dusky capped flycatcher
- Myiarchus cinerascens: papamoscas cenizo, ash throated flycatcher
- Myiarchus nuttingi: papamoscas de Nutting, Nutting's flycatcher
- Myiarchus tyrannulus: papamoscas tirano, brown-crested flycatcher

==== Ramphotrigon ====
- Ramphotrigon flammulatum: papamoscas jaspeado, flammulated flycatcher

==== Pitangus ====
- Pitangus sulphuratus: luis bienteveo, great kiskadee

==== Megarynchus ====
- Megarynchus pitangua: luis pico grueso, boat billed flycatcher

==== Myiozetetes ====
- Myiozetetes similis: luis gregario, social flycatcher

==== Myiodynastes ====
- Myiodynastes luteiventris: papamoscas atigrado, sulphur bellied flycatcher

==== Tyrannus ====
- Tyrannus melancholicus: tirano tropical, tropical kingbird
- Tyrannus vociferans: tirano gritón, Cassin's kingbird
- Tyrannus crassirostris: tirano pico grueso, thick-billed kingbird
- Tyrannus verticalis: tirano pálido, western kingbird

==== Pachyramphus ====
- Pachyramphus major: mosquero cabezón mexicano, gray-collared becard
- Pachyramphus aglaiae: mosquero cebezón degollado, rose throated becard

==== Tityra ====
- Tityra semifasciata: titira emmascarada, masked tityra

=== Laniidae ===
==== Lanius ====
- Lanius ludovicianus: alcaudón verdugo, loggerhead shrike

=== Vireonidae ===
==== Vireo ====
- Vireo brevipennis: vireo pizarra, slaty vireo
- Vireo bellii: vireo de Bell, Bell's vireo
- Vireo atricapilla: vireo gorra negra, black-capped vireo
- Vireo nelsoni: vireo enano, dwarf vireo
- Vireo cassinii: vireo de Cassin, Cassin's vireo
- Vireo plumbeous or Vireo solitarius: vireo plomozo, plumbeous vireo
- Vireo huttoni: vireo reyezuelo, Hutton's vireo
- Vireo hypochryseus: vireo dorado, golden vireo
- Vireo gilvus: vireo gorjeador, warbling vireo
- Vireo flavoviridis: vireo verde-amarillo, yellow-green vireo

==== Vireolanius ====
- Vireolanius melitophrys: vireón pecho castaño, chestnut-sided shrike vireo

=== Corvidae ===
==== Calocitta ====
- Calocitta colliei: urraca hermosa cara negra, black-throated magpie jay
- Calocitta formosa: urraca hermosa cara blanca, white-throated magpie jay

==== Cyanocorax ====
- Cyanocorax yncas: chara verde, green jay
- Cyanocorax sanblasianus: chara de San Blas, San Blas jay

==== Aphelocoma ====
- Aphelocoma ultramarina: chara pecho gris, Mexican jay, grey breasted jay

==== Corvus ====
- Corvus corax: cuervo común, common raven

=== Hirundinidae ===
==== Progne ====
- Progne sinaloae: golondrina sinaloense, Sinaloa martin
- Progne chalybea: golondrina acerada, gray-breasted martin

==== Tachycineta ====
- Tachycineta bicolor: golondrina bicolor, tree swallow
- Tachycineta thalassina: golondrina verdemar, violet-green swallow

==== Stelgidopteryx ====
- Stelgidopteryx serripennis: golondrina ala aserrada, northern rough winged swallow

==== Hirundo ====
- Hirundo rustica: golondrina tijereta, barn swallow

==== Calocitta ====
- Petrochelidon pyrrhonota: golondrina de acantilado, cliff swallow

=== Paridae ===
==== Poecile ====
- Poecile sclateri: carbonero mexicano, Mexican chickadee

==== Progne ====
- Baeolophus wollweberi: carbonero embridado, bridled titmouse

=== Aegithalidae ===
==== Psaltriparus ====
- Psaltriparus minimus: sastrecillo, verdin

=== Sittidae ===
==== Sitta ====
- Sitta carolinensis: sita pecho blanco, white-breasted nuthatch

=== Certhiidae ===
==== Certhia ====
- Certhia americana: trepador americano, brown creeper

=== Troglodytidae ===
==== Campylorhynchus ====
- Campylorhynchus gularis: matraca serrana, spotted wren

==== Catherpes ====
- Catherpes mexicanus: chivirín barranqueño, canyon wren

==== Thryothorus ====
- Thryothorus sinaloa: chivirín sinaloense, Sinaloa wren
- Thryothorus felix: chivirin feliz, happy wren

==== Uropsila ====
- Uropsila leucogastra: chivirín vientre blanco, white-bellied wren

==== Thryomanes ====
- Thryomanes bewickii: chivirín cola oscura, Bewick's wren

==== Troglodytes ====
- Troglodytes aedon: chivirín saltapared, house wren
- Troglodytes brunneicollis: chivirín garganta café, brown-throated (house) wren

==== Henicorhina ====
- Henicorhina leucophrys: chivirín pecho gris, grey-breasted wood wren

=== Cinclidae ===
==== Cinclus ====
- Cinclus mexicanus: mirlo acuático norteamericano, American dipper

=== Regulidae ===
==== Regulus ====
- ''regulus calendula'': reyezuelo de rojo, ruby-crowned kinglet
- Regulus satrapa: reyezuelo de oro, golden-crowned kinglet

=== Sylviidae ===
==== Polioptila ====
- Polioptila caerulea: perlita azulgris, blue-gray gnatcatcher
- Polioptila nigriceps: perlita sinaloense, black-capped gnatcatcher

=== Turdidae ===
==== Sialia ====
- Sialia sialis: azulejo garganta canela, eastern bluebird

==== Myadestes ====
- Myadestes occidentalis: clarín jilguero, brown-backed solitaire

==== Catharus ====
- Catharus aurantiirostris: zorzal pico naranja, orange-billed nightingale-thrush
- Catharus occidentalis: zorzal mexicano, russet nightingale-thrush
- Catharus frantzii: zorzal de Frantzius, ruddy-capped nightingale-thrush
- Catharus ustulatus: zorzal de Swainson, Swainson's thrush
- Catharus guttatus: zorzal cola rufa, hermit thrush

==== Turdus ====
- Turdus assimilis: mirlo garganta blanca, white-throated robin
- Turdus rufopalliatus: mirlo dorso rufo, rufous backed robin
- Turdus migratorius: mirlo primavera, American robin

==== Ridgwayia ====
- Ridgwayia pinicola: mirlo pinto, Aztec thrush

=== Mimidae ===
==== Mimus ====
- Mimus polyglottos: centzontle norteño, northern mockingbird

==== Toxostoma ====
- Toxostoma curvirostre: cuitlacoche pico curvo, curve-billed thrasher

==== Melanotis ====
- Melanotis caerulescens: mulato azul, blue mockingbird

=== Motacillidae ===
==== Anthus ====
- Anthus rubescens: bisbita de agua, water (American) pipit
- Anthus spragueii: bisbita llanera, Sprague's pipit

=== Bombycillidae ===
==== Bombycilla ====
- Bombycilla cedrorum: ampelis chinito, cedar waxwing

=== Ptilogonatidae ===
==== Ptilogonys ====
- Ptilogonys cinereus: capulinero gris, gray silky flycatcher

=== Peucedramidae ===
==== Peucedramus ====
- Peucedramus taeniatus: ocotero enmascarado, olive warbler

=== Parulidae ===
==== Vermivora ====
- Vermivora celata: chipe corona naranja, orange-crowned warbler
- Vermivora ruficapilla: chipe de coronilla, Nashville warbler
- Vermivora virginiae: chipe de Virginia, Virginia's warbler
- Vermivora crissalis: chipe crisal, Colima warbler
- Vermivora luciae: chipe rabadilla rufa, Lucy's warbler

==== Parula ====
- Parula superciliosa: parula ceja blanca, crescent-chested warbler
- Parula pitiayumi: parula tropical, tropical parula

==== Dendroica ====
- Dendroica petechia: chipe amarillo, yellow warbler
- Dendroica magnolia: chipe de magnolia, magnolia warbler
- Dendroica coronata: chipe coronado, yellow-rumped warbler
- Dendroica nigrescens: chipe negrogris, black-throated gray warbler
- Dendroica virens: chipe dorso verde, black-throated green warbler
- Dendroica townsendi: chipe negroamarillo, Townsend's warbler
- Dendroica occidentalis: chipe cabeza amarillo, hermit warbler
- Dendroica graciae: chipe ceja amarilla, Grace's warbler
- Dendroica palmarum: chipe playero, palm warbler

==== Mniotilta ====
- Mniotilta varia: chipe trepador, black and white warbler

==== Setophaga ====
- Setophaga ruticilla: chipe flameante, American redstart

==== Seiurus ====
- Seiurus aurocapilla: chipe suelero, ovenbird
- Seiurus noveboracensis: chipe charquero, northern waterthrush
- Seiurus motacilla: chipe arroyero, Louisiana waterthrush

==== Oporornis ====
- Oporornis tolmiei: chipe de Tolmiei, MacGillivray's warbler

==== Geothlypis ====
- Geothlypis trichas: mascarita común, common yellowthroat
- Geothlypis poliocephala: mascarita pico grueso, gray-crowned yellowthroat

==== Wilsonia ====
- Wilsonia citrina: chipe encapuchado, hooded warbler
- Wilsonia pusilla: chipe corona negra, Wilson's warbler

==== Cardellina ====
- Cardellina rubrifrons: chipe cara roja, red faced warbler

==== Ergaticus ====
- Ergaticus ruber: chipe rojo, red warbler

==== Myioborus ====
- Myioborus pictus: chipe ala blanca, painted redstart
- Myioborus miniatus: chipe de montaña, slate-throated redstart

==== Euthlypis ====
- Euthlypis lachrymosa: chipe de roca, fan-tailed warbler

==== Basileuterus ====
- Basileuterus rufifrons: chipe gorra rufa, rufous-capped warbler
- Basileuterus culicivorus: chipe corona dorada, golded-crowned warbler
- Basileuterus belli: chipe ceja dorada, golden-browed warbler

==== Icteria ====
- Icteria virens: buscabreña, yellow-breasted chat

=== Thraupidae ===
==== Rhodinocichla ====
- Rhodinocichla rosea: tángara cuitlacoche, rosy thrush tanager

==== Saltator ====
- Saltator coerulescens: picurero grisáceo, grayish saltator

=== Emberizidae ===
==== Volatinia ====
- Volatinia jacarina: semillero brincador, blue-black grassquit

==== Sporophila ====
- Sporophila torqueola: semillero de collar, white-collared seedeater

==== Amaurospiza ====
- Amaurospiza relicta: semillero azulgris, slate blue seedeater

==== Diglossa ====
- Diglossa baritula: picaflor canelo, cinnamon-bellied flowerpiercer

==== Atlapetes ====
- Atlapetes pileatus: atlapetes gorra rufa, rufous-capped brush-finch

==== Arremon ====
- Arremon virenticeps: atlapetes rayas verdes, green-striped brush-finch

==== Arremonops ====
- Arremonops rufivirgatus: rascador oliváceo, olive sparrow

==== Melozone ====
- Melozone kieneri: rascador nuca rufa, rusty-crowned ground-sparrow

==== Pipilo ====
- Pipilo ocai: toquí de collar, collared towhee
- Pipilo chlorurus: toquí cola verde, green-tailed towhee
- Pipilo fuscus: toquí pardo, canyon (brown) towhee

==== Aimophila ====
- Aimophila ruficauda: zacatonero corona rayada, stripe-headed sparrow
- Aimophila humeralis: zacatonero pecho negro, black-chested sparrow
- Aimophila botterii: zacatonero de Botteri, Botteri's sparrow
- Aimophila ruficeps: zacatonero corona rufa, rufous-crowned sparrow
- Aimophila rufescens: zacatonero rojizo, rusty sparrow

==== Amphispizopsis ====
- Amphispizopsis quinquestriata: zacatonero cinco rayas, five-striped sparrow

==== Spizella ====
- Spizella passerina: gorrión ceja blanca, chipping sparrow
- Spizella pallida: gorrión palido, clay-colored sparrow

==== Pooecetes ====
- Pooecetes gramineus: gorrión cola blanca, vesper sparrow

==== Chondestes ====
- Chondestes grammacus: gorrión arlequin, lark sparrow

==== Passerculus ====
- Passerculus sandwichensis: gorrión sabanero, Savannah sparrow

==== Ammodramus ====
- Ammodramus savannarum: gorrión chapulin, grasshopper sparrow

==== Melospiza ====
- Melospiza melodia: gorrión cantor, song sparrow
- Melospiza lincolnii: gorrión de Lincoln, Lincoln's sparrow

==== Zonotrichia ====
- Zonotrichia leucophrys: gorrión corona blanca, white-crowned sparrow

==== Junco ====
- Junco phaeonotus: junco ojo de lumbre, yellow-eyed junco

=== Icteridae ===
==== Agelaius ====
- Agelaius phoeniceus: tordo sargento, red-winged blackbird

==== Xanthocephalus ====
- Xanthocephalus xanthocephalus: tordo cabeza amarilla, yellow-headed blackbird

==== Sturnella ====
- Sturnella magna: pradero tortilla-con-chile, eastern meadowlark

==== Euphagus ====
- Euphagus cyanocephalus: tordo ojo amarillo, Brewer's blackbird

==== Quiscalus ====
- Quiscalus mexicanus: zanate mexicano, great-tailed grackle

==== Molothrus ====
- Molothrus aeneus: tordo ojo rojo, bronzed cowbird
- Molothrus ater: tordo cabeza café, brown-headed cowbird

==== Icterus ====
- Icterus wagleri: bolsero de Wagleri, black-vented oriole
- Icterus spurius: bolsero castaño, orchard oriole
- Icterus cucullatus: bolsero encapuchado, hooded oriole
- Icterus pustulatus: bolsero dorso rayado, streak-backed oriole
- Icterus bullockii: bolsero calandria, northern (Bullock's) oriole
- Icterus graduacauda: bolsero cabeza negra, Audubon's (black-headed) oriole
- Icterus galbula: bolsero de Baltimore, northern (Baltimore) oriole
- Icterus parisorum: bolsero tunero, Scott's oriole

==== Cacicus ====
- Cacicus melanicterus: cacique mexicano, yellow-winged cacique

=== Fringillidae ===
==== Euphonia ====
- Euphonia affinis: eufonia garganta negra, scrub euphonia
- Chlorophonia elegantissima: eufonia capucha azul, blue-hooded euphonia

==== Carpodacus ====
- Carpodacus mexicanus: pizón mexicano, house finch

==== Loxia ====
- Loxia curvirostra: picotuerto rojo, red crossbill

==== Spinus ====
- Spinus pinus or Carduelis pinus: jilguero pinero, pine siskin
- Spinus notatus or Carduelis notatus: jilguero encapuchado, black-headed siskin
- Spinus psaltria or Carduelis psaltria: jilguero dominico, lesser goldfinch

=== Passeridae ===
==== Passer ====
- Passer domesticus: gorrión casero, house sparrow

== See also ==
- Plants of the Sierra de Manantlán Biosphere Reserve
- Reptiles of the Sierra de Manantlán Biosphere Reserve
