= Quercus centenaria =

Conservation status
- Data Deficient (IUCN 3.1)

Scientific classification
- Kingdom: Plantae
- Clade: Embryophytes
- Clade: Tracheophytes
- Clade: Spermatophytes
- Clade: Angiosperms
- Clade: Eudicots
- Clade: Rosids
- Order: Fagales
- Family: Fagaceae
- Genus: Quercus
- Subgenus: Quercus subg. Quercus
- Section: Quercus sect. Quercus
- Species: Q. centenaria

Binomial name
- Quercus centenaria L.M.González

Species of flowering plant

Quercus centenaria is a species of oak. It is a tree native to the states of Jalisco and Nayarit in western Mexico. It grows in humid montane pine-oak forests and pine forests, often in ravines and along streams, from 1,000 to 2,000 meters elevation in the western Trans-Mexican Volcanic Belt and Sierra Madre del Sur, including the Sierra de Manantlán.

The species was described by Luz Maria González in 2018.
