= Cerro Grande (Mexico) =

Mountain range in Mexico

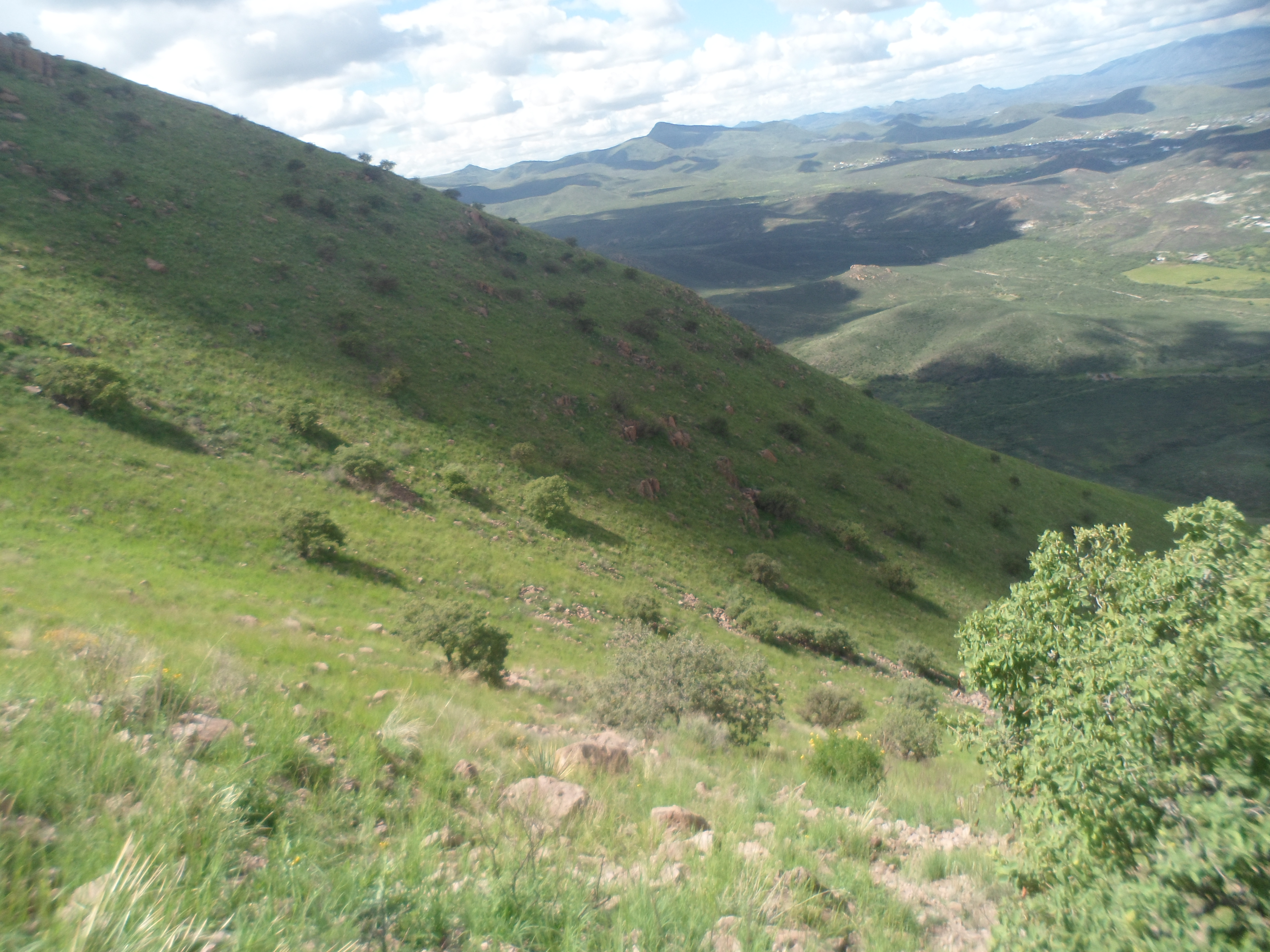
Cerro Grande

The Cerro Grande is a mountain range in Mexico. Located in the Sierra de Manantlán biosphere. It is located in the states of Colima and Jalisco.

It has an elevation of 3093 metres.

== Fauna ==
In the Cerro live multiple species: white-tailed deer (Odocoileus virginianus), gray fox (Urocyon cinereoargenteus) false scorpion (Barisia imbricata), the coralillo (Lampropeltis triangulum), the rattlesnake (Crotalus basiliscus), the jaguar (Panthera onca), the coati (Nasua narica) wild boar (Pecari tajacu), and the puma (Puma concolor)
