= Frederic Ward Putnam =

United States archaeologist, ethnologist and curator

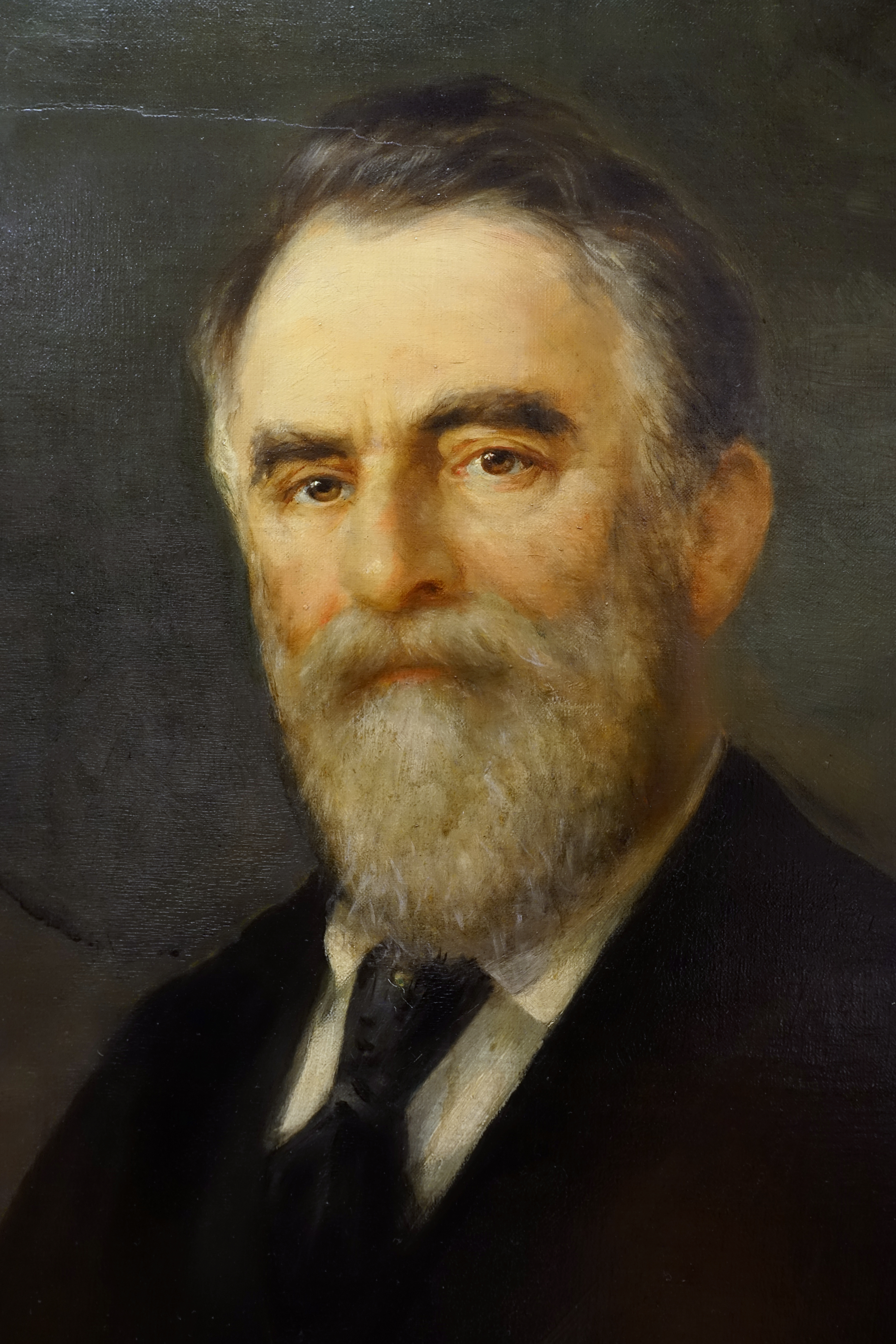
- Frederic Ward Putnam
- Born: April 16, 1839; Salem, Massachusetts
- Died: August 14, 1915 (aged 76); Cambridge, Massachusetts
- Scientific career
- Fields: biologist and anthropology
- Workplaces: Harvard University
- Doctoral advisor: Louis Agassiz

Frederic Ward Putnam (April 16, 1839 – August 14, 1915) was an American anthropologist and biologist.

== Biography ==
Putnam was born and raised in Salem, Massachusetts, the son of Ebenezer (1797–1876) and Elizabeth (Appleton) Putnam. After leaving college, Ebenezer had for a short time engaged in fitting young men for college, but soon went into business in Cincinnati as a commission merchant, a line in which he was successful. Recalled to Salem by his father's death in 1876, Ebenezer married there and devoted himself to the study and cultivation of plants and fruits, and involved himself in the Democratic Party in his county. Although frequently offered office, Ebenezer never accepted, except to serve as alderman in the so-called "model-government" of Salem when that town was first chartered as a city, and as postmaster of Salem.

Frederic's early studies were at private schools, and with his father at home. He became curator of ornithology at the Essex Institute in Salem in 1856. That year he published List of the Birds of Essex County. A visit of Louis Agassiz to Salem, who appreciated his abilities, resulted in his taking his college studies at the Lawrence Scientific School of Harvard University, where he was a student of Agassiz at the Museum of Comparative Zoology which was also part of Harvard. However, he broke with Agassiz over the theory of evolution and led his fellow students in an academic revolt. Putnam graduated from Harvard in 1862, and his early work was as a naturalist done with fellow students he had first met while studying under Agassiz, Edward Sylvester Morse, A. S. Packard and Alpheus Hyatt. These four were later the founders of the American Naturalist in 1867. Putnam originated The Naturalist's Directory in 1865.

In 1864 Putnam became the first director of the Peabody Museum of Salem. He was closely involved with convincing George Peabody to put up the money to found the museum. In 1867 he was appointed superintendent of the East Indian Marine Society's Museum at Salem.

In 1865, Putnam published a paper on "An Indian Grave and its Contents, on Winter Island, Salem, Massachusetts." His archeological activity may be said to date from the publication of this paper, for, on looking over the long list of titles of his publications, it will be seen that, from this time, papers on early American man steadily increase in number, and the work of the zoologist practically ceases.

In 1874 Putnam became the curator of the Peabody Museum of Archaeology and Ethnology at Harvard University from 1874 to 1909. Putnam was personable and recruited many students, including women and Native Americans. He directed archæological digs across 37 U.S. states and in other countries. In 1875, he was appointed civilian assistant on the United States surveys west of the 100th meridian, his duties being to make investigations and reports of the archæological and ethnological material collected. Putnam studied both natural history and North American archeology. Among other projects, Putnam did an archaeological survey of Ohio from 1880 to 1895, where he was instrumental in having the Great Serpent Mound preserved. He also surveyed New Jersey extensively.

Putnam was appointed the lead curator and head of the anthropology department in 1891 for the World's Columbian Exposition, to be held in Chicago in 1893. He spent much of the two years leading up to the exposition organizing and directing expeditions dispatched to all parts of the Americas and other parts of the world to gather natural history and ethnographic items for the exhibition. As the exposition was drawing to a close, Putnam agitated for a permanent home to be found for the collection of artifacts amassed under his supervision. Late in 1893 what was to become the Field Museum of Natural History was incorporated, opening the following year. Putnam held hopes of becoming the museum's first director but was unsuccessful.

Putnam was also active in professional organizations, which were rapidly organizing. In 1882 he was elected a member of the American Antiquarian Society, in 1895 he was elected to the American Philosophical Society, and in 1898 he was elected president of the American Association for the Advancement of Science. In 1901 he was president of the American Folklore Society. In 1905 he was president of the American Anthropological Association. He was invited to become a member of the National Academy of Sciences and of many foreign learned societies.

Putnam is widely known as the "Father of American Archaeology" for his contribution of scientific methods and direction of many of the nascent field's best students, including Arthur C. Parker.

He died in Cambridge, Massachusetts on 14 August 1915.

== Recognition ==
A species of Mexican snake, Manolepis putnami, is named in his honor.

== See also ==
- Category:Taxa named by Frederic Ward Putnam
