= Sierra de Manantlán Biosphere Reserve =

Biosphere reserve in Mexico

- IUCN category VI (protected area with sustainable use of natural resources)
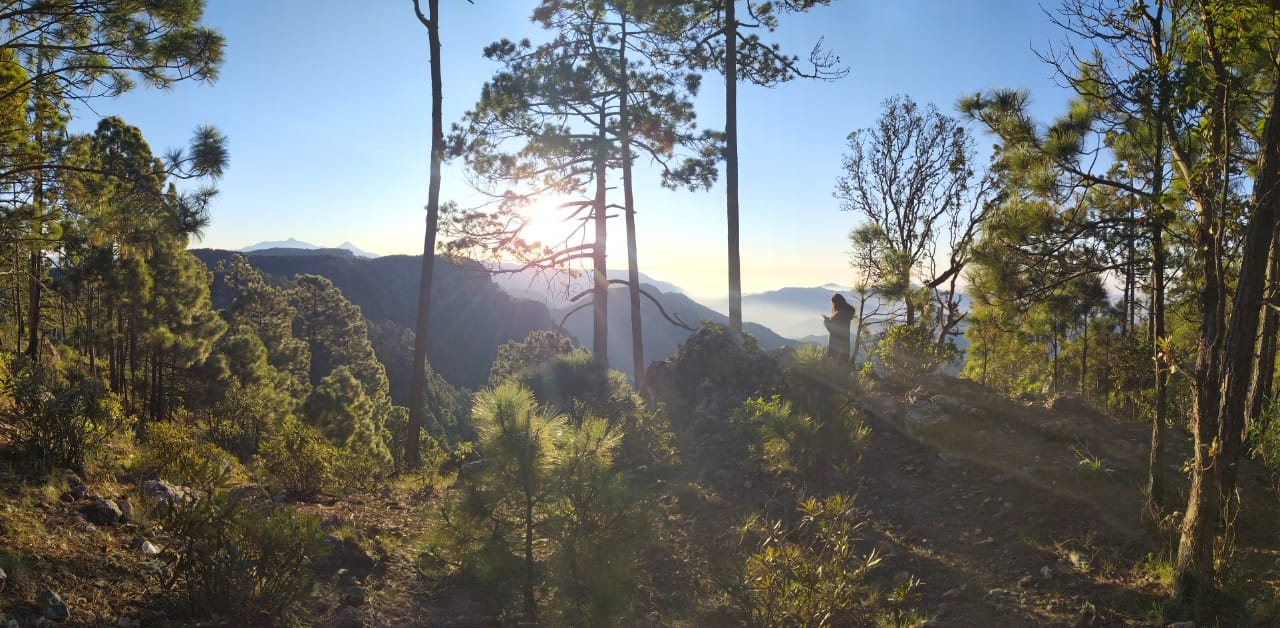
- Sierra de Manantlán

- Location within Mexico
- Location: Colima and Jalisco, Mexico
- Coordinates: 19°19′12″N 103°52′48″W
- Area: 139,577 ha (538.91 sq mi)
- Designation: Biosphere reserve
- Designated: 1987 (national) 1988 (international)
- Administrator: National Commission of Natural Protected Areas

The Sierra de Manantlán Biosphere Reserve (Spanish: Reserva de la Biósfera Sierra de Manantlán) (established 1988) is a UNESCO Biosphere Reserve in the states of Colima and Jalisco, Mexico. The 139,577 hectares (538.91 sq mi) reserve is located in the transition of the Nearctic and Neotropical realms and encompasses parts of the Sierra Madre del Sur, with a wide range of altitudes, climates and soils. The effects of tectonic and volcanic activities and erosion are notable within the reserve.

== Geography ==
The reserve is in the Sierra de Manantlán, part of the western Sierra Madre del Sur. The Cerro Grande mountain ridge is located within the biosphere. The reserve is mostly in Jalisco state, with a portion in Colima. The reserve is administered by the municipalities of Autlán, Cuautitlán, Casimiro Castillo, Tolimán and Tuxcacuesco in Jalisco and Minatitlán and Comala in Colima.

Anthropologists know the region as Zona de Occidente, an area notably different from the rest of Mesoamerica. Some ceramic remnants, figurines and graves have been found, but there is little other material evidence.

== Flora and fauna ==
Different types of forests are present in the reserve including mesophytic, cloud, and dry deciduous and semi-deciduous tropical forests.

The Sierra de Manantlán Biosphere Reserve is located to the extreme north of the Intertropical Convergence Zone. The climate in the region is influenced by various factors in addition to its latitudinal location, such as its proximity to the coast, the effect of its landform – orographic shade – and the breadth of the altitudinal range, which partly explains the high regional biodiversity and the presence of numerous plant formations ranging from tropical forests to those of temperate-cold climates.

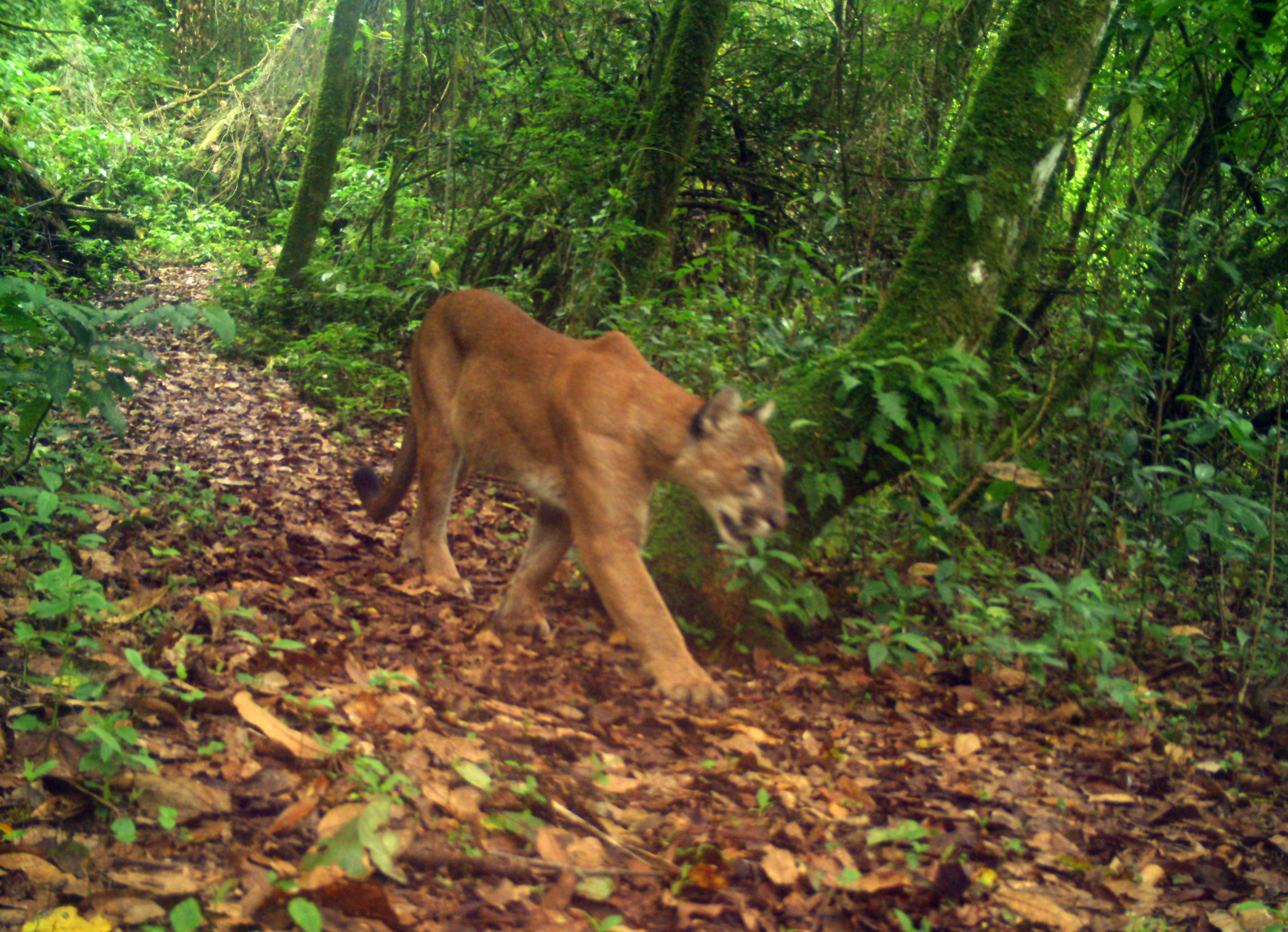
A puma in the Niebla forest, Sierra de Manantlan

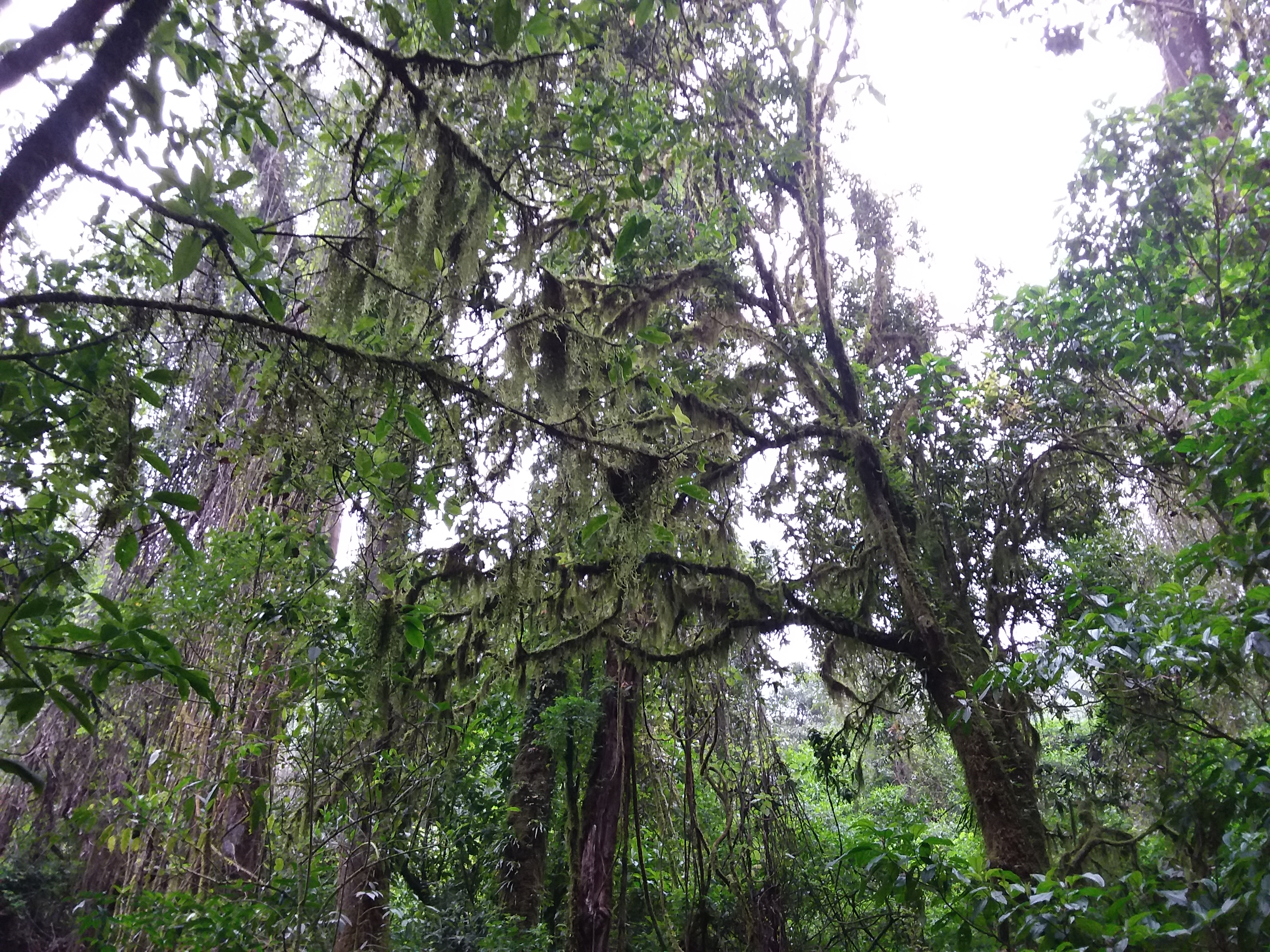
The forest of Mesófilo de Montaña

The Sierra de Manantlán’s varied and complex plant cover harbours a great wealth of flora. There are over 2900 species of vascular plants belonging to 981 genera (see Plants of the Reserva de la Biosfera Manantlan) for a growing list. Wildlife is one of the important components of the high biodiversity in this reserve. Among the main values of the Sierra de Manantlán, in addition to its great wealth of species and its unique biogeographical characteristics, are the presence of endangered or useful endemic species. So far 110 species of mammals have been reported, which include the Mexican vole (Microtus mexicanus neveriae) and the smoky pocket gopher (Cratogeomys fumosus), in addition to other mammals such as the oncilla, the jaguarandi, the ocelot, the puma, the bobcat, the jaguar and four species of nectarivorous bats.

Three hundred and thirty-six species of birds have been reported, among them 36 which are endemic to Mexico, such as the charismatic species: the crested guan (Penelope purpurascens), the military macaw (Ara militaris), the red-lored amazon (Amazona autumnalis), and the Mexican national symbol, the golden eagle. Eighty-five species of amphibians and reptiles have been recorded; of these it is known that 13 are endemic to the western and central region of Mexico: the rattlesnake, the black iguana, the frog Shyrrhopus modestus, the beaded lizard (Heloderma horridum) and the Autlan rattlesnake (Crotalus lannomi), an endemic species only reported for the area of Puerto de Los Mazos. Of the 16 species of fish identified, 13 are native and four of these are endemic to the region.

== Conservation ==
The area was designated a biosphere reserve by the Mexican government in 1987, with an area of 976.76 km^{2}. The next year it was designated an international UNESCO-MAB Biosphere Reserve by UNESCO, including the national reserve and a buffer zone.

As of 2002, more than 40,000 people lived in the Sierra de Manantlán, engaged mainly in agriculture (corn, beans, tomatoes, sugarcane, watermelon, mangoes), livestock grazing, timber production, and extraction of wood for fuel and mining of coal or minerals. Their living conditions are poor and marginal.

== See also ==
- Plants of the Sierra de Manantlán Biosphere Reserve
- List of birds of the Sierra de Manantlán Biosphere Reserve
- Reptiles of the Sierra de Manantlán Biosphere Reserve

== Sources ==
- Vázquez García, José Antonio; Cuevas Guzmán, Ramón; Cochrane, Theodore S.; Iltis, Hugh H.; Santana Michel, Francisco J.; Guzmán Hernández, Luis (1995). Flora de Manantlán [Flora of Manantlán]. Sida, Botanical Miscellany. Vol. 13. Botanical Research Institute of Texas. ISSN 0883-1475.

This article incorporates text from a free content work (license statement/permission). Text taken from UNESCO - MAB Biosphere Reserves Directory, UNESCO, UNESCO.
