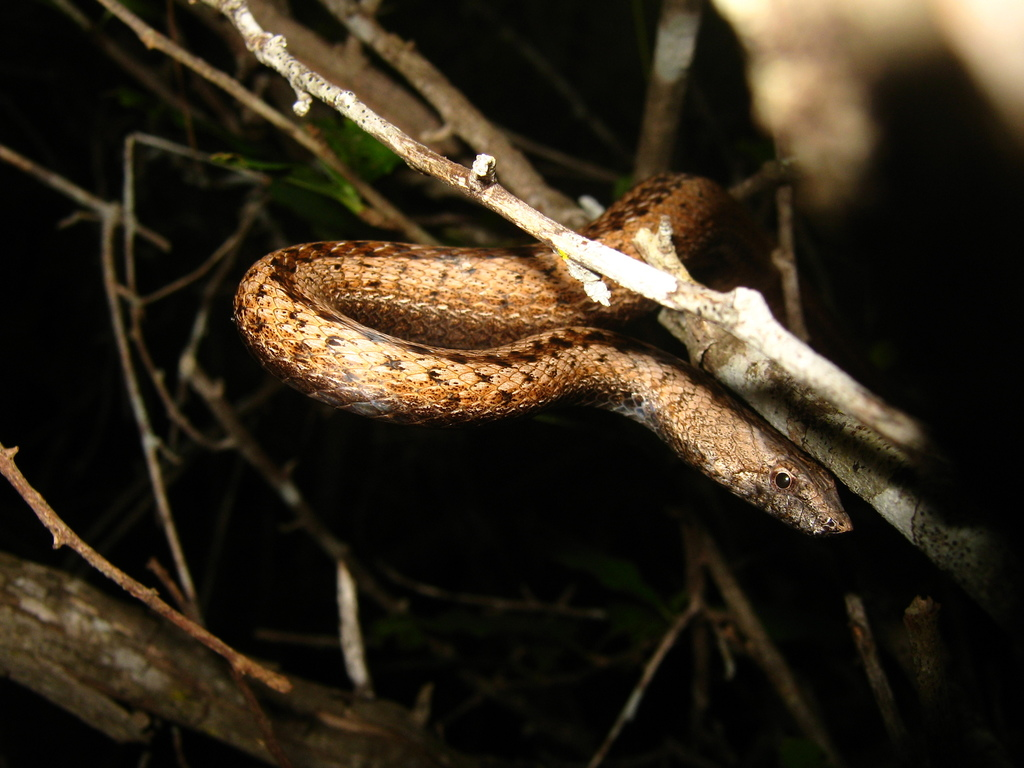

Conservation status
- Least Concern (IUCN 3.1)

Scientific classification
- Kingdom: Animalia
- Phylum: Chordata
- Class: Reptilia
- Order: Squamata
- Suborder: Serpentes
- Family: Colubridae
- Genus: Manolepis; Cope, 1885
- Species: M. putnami

Binomial name
- Manolepis putnami (Jan, 1863)

Synonyms
- Dromicus putnami Jan, 1863; Tomodon nasutus Cope, 1864; Manolepis nasutus — Cope, 1885; Dromicus (Ocyophis) putnami — Bocourt, 1890; Philodryas putnami — Günther, 1895; Manolepis putnami — Boulenger, 1896

= Ridgehead snake =

Species of snake

The ridgehead snake (Manolepis putnami) is a species of snake in the family Colubridae. The species is endemic to southeastern Mexico.

== Etymology ==
The specific name, putnami, is in honor of American anthropologist Frederic Ward Putnam.

== Taxonomy ==
M. putnami is the type species of the monotypic genus Manolepis.

== Geographic range ==
M. putnami is found in the Mexican states of Chiapas, Colima, Guerrero, Jalisco, Nayarit, and Oaxaca.

== Habitat ==
The natural habitat of M. putnami is forest.

== Description ==
M. putnami may attain a total length of 55 cm (22 in), including a tail 14 cm (5.5 in) long. Dorsally, it is pale brown or yellowish, with a brown, darker-edged vertebral stripe three scales wide. Ventrally it is whitish, speckled with brown. The dorsal scales are smooth, without apical pits, and in 19 rows at midbody. The anal plate is divided, and the subcaudals are in two rows.

M. putnami is rear-fanged (opisthoglyphous). It has 15 small, equal maxillary teeth, followed, after a space, by two enlarged grooved fangs. The anterior mandibular teeth are much longer than the posterior.
