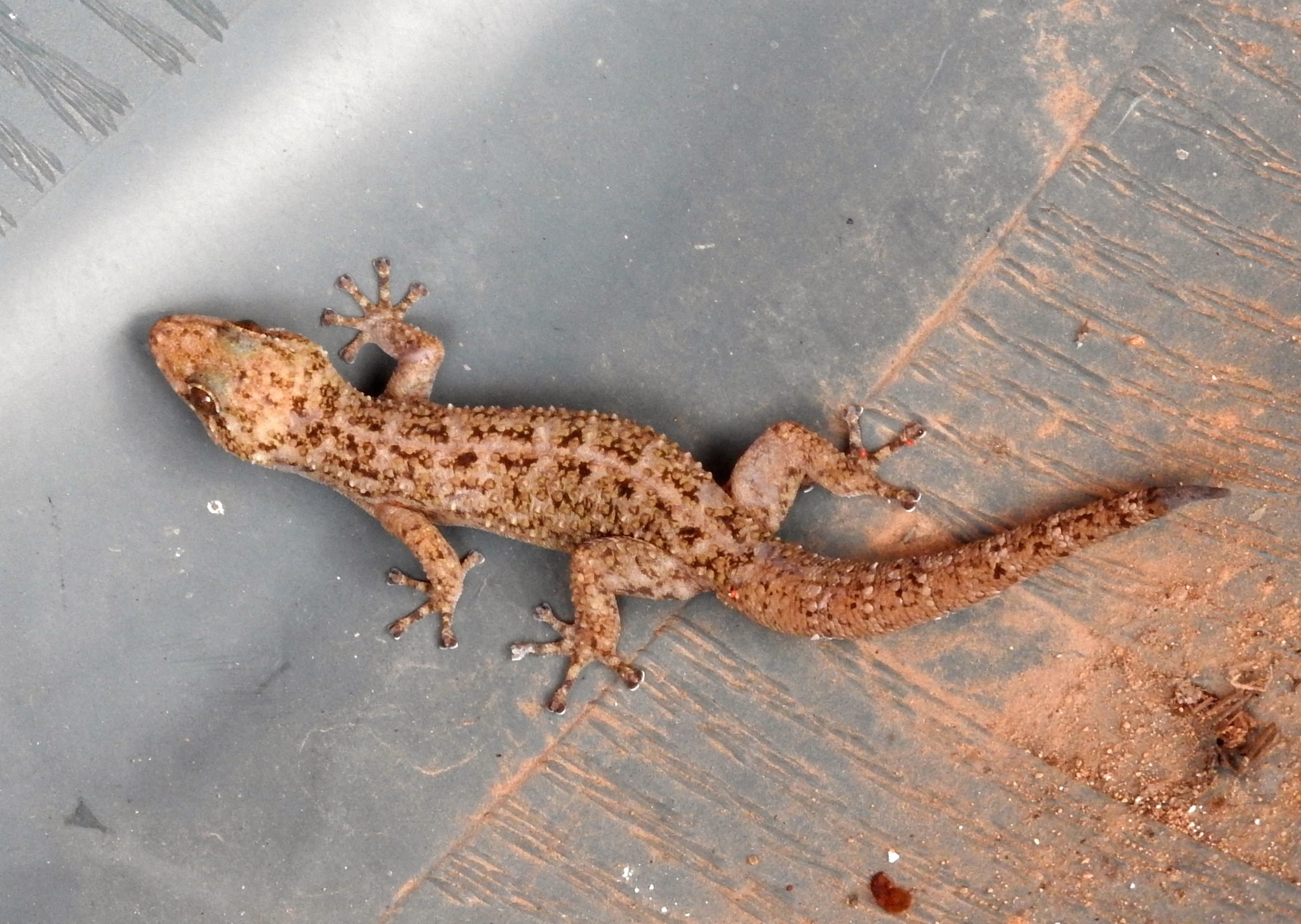

Conservation status
- Least Concern (IUCN 3.1)

Scientific classification
- Kingdom: Animalia
- Phylum: Chordata
- Class: Reptilia
- Order: Squamata
- Suborder: Gekkota
- Family: Phyllodactylidae
- Genus: Phyllodactylus
- Species: P. lanei

Binomial name
- Phyllodactylus lanei H.M. Smith, 1935

= Lane's leaf-toed gecko =

Species of lizard

Lane's leaf-toed gecko (Phyllodactylus lanei), also known commonly as la salamanquesa de Lane in Mexican Spanish, is a species of lizard in the family Phyllodactylidae. The species is endemic to Mexico. There are four recognized subspecies.

== Etymology ==
The specific name, lanei, is in honor of Brazilian entomologist Frederico Lane.

== Geographic range ==
P. lanei is found in western-central Mexico, in the Mexican states of Colima, Guerrero, Jalisco, Michoacán, Morelos, Nayarit, and Zacatecas.

== Habitat ==
P. lanei is found in a variety of habitats, including forest, shrubland, urban areas, and inside houses.

== Reproduction ==
P. lanei is oviparous.

== Subspecies ==
The following four subspecies are recognized as being valid, including the nominotypical subspecies.

- Phyllodactylus lanei isabelae Castro-Franco & Uribe-Peña, 1992
- Phyllodactylus lanei lanei H.M. Smith, 1935
- Phyllodactylus lanei lupitae Castro-Franco & Uribe-Peña, 1992
- Phyllodactylus lanei rupinus Dixon, 1964
