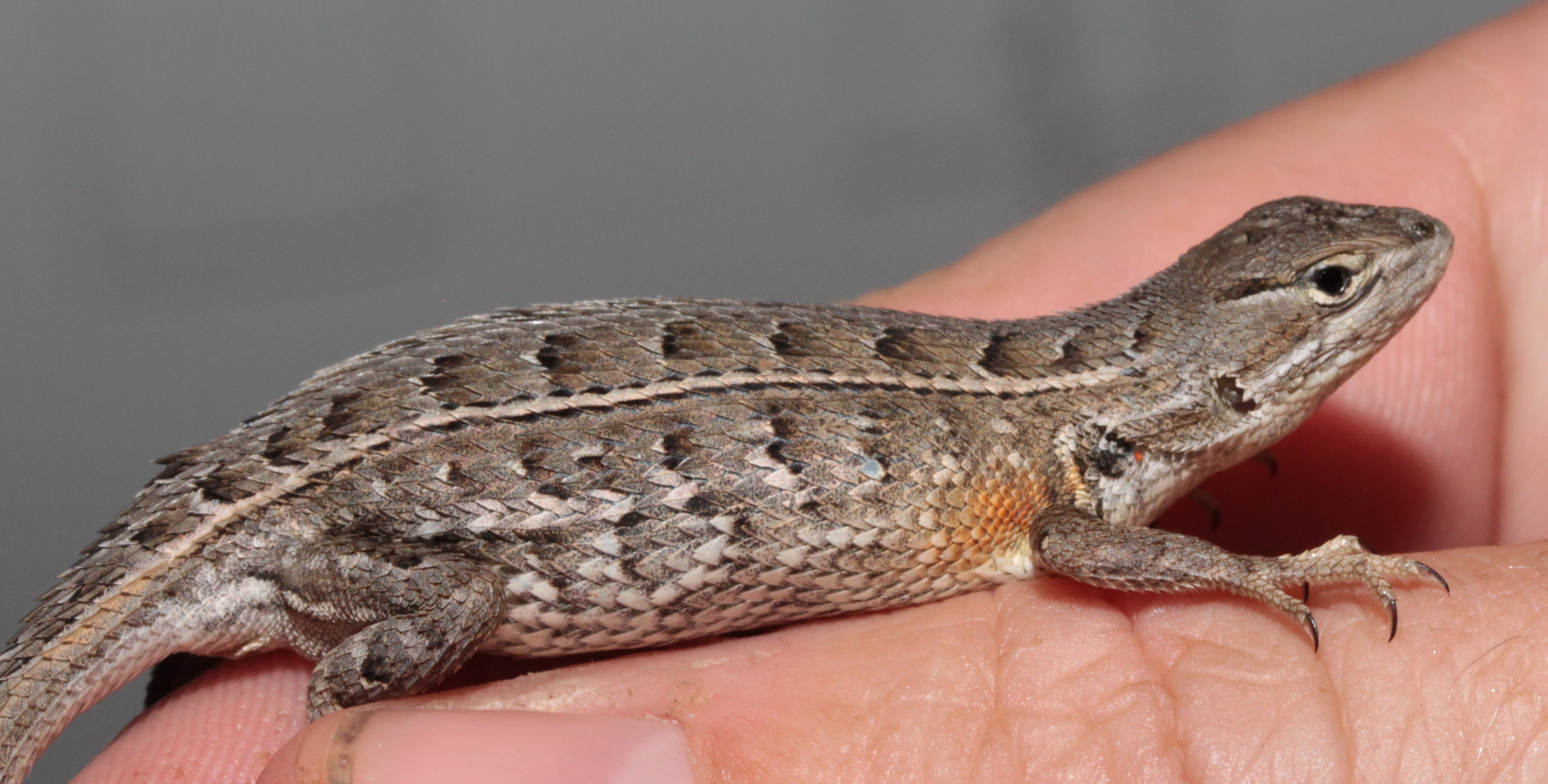
- Adult female

Conservation status
- Least Concern (IUCN 3.1)

Scientific classification
- Kingdom: Animalia
- Phylum: Chordata
- Class: Reptilia
- Order: Squamata
- Suborder: Iguania
- Family: Phrynosomatidae
- Genus: Sceloporus
- Species: S. scalaris

Binomial name
- Sceloporus scalaris Wiegmann, 1828

= Sceloporus scalaris =

Bunch grass lizard

Species of lizard

Sceloporus scalaris, the light-bellied bunch grass lizard, is a species of small, phrynosomatid lizard.

== Taxonomy ==
Currently, Sceloporus scalaris belongs in the scalaris group with a fluctuating number of other species. In 2010, Wiens et al. recognized the following species: Sceloporus aeneus, S. bicanthalis, S.chaneyi, S.goldmani, S. scalaris, and S. subniger while others such as Bryson et al. 2011 recognize: Sceloporus aeneus, S. bicanthalis, S.chaneyi, S.goldmani, S. samcolemani, S. scalaris, and S. slevini

== Distribution ==
S. scalaris is widely distributed in Mexico, expanding northward from the Trans-Mexican Volcanic Belt to the southern United States of Arizona and New Mexico. The species is typically found in high elevation grasslands (1500 – 3000 m).

== Description ==
Bunch grass lizards are typically grey in color, often with orange and yellow coloration around the neck and behind the forelimbs. Males will have more of this vibrant coloration on their underside while female undersides tend to be white. Adults range from 52–62 mm snout-to-vent length (Ortega and Barbault, 1986).

== Reproduction ==
Many species of Sceloporus are ovoviviparous including the scalaris species. Juveniles are seen for the first time in late August (Ortega and Barbault, 1986).
