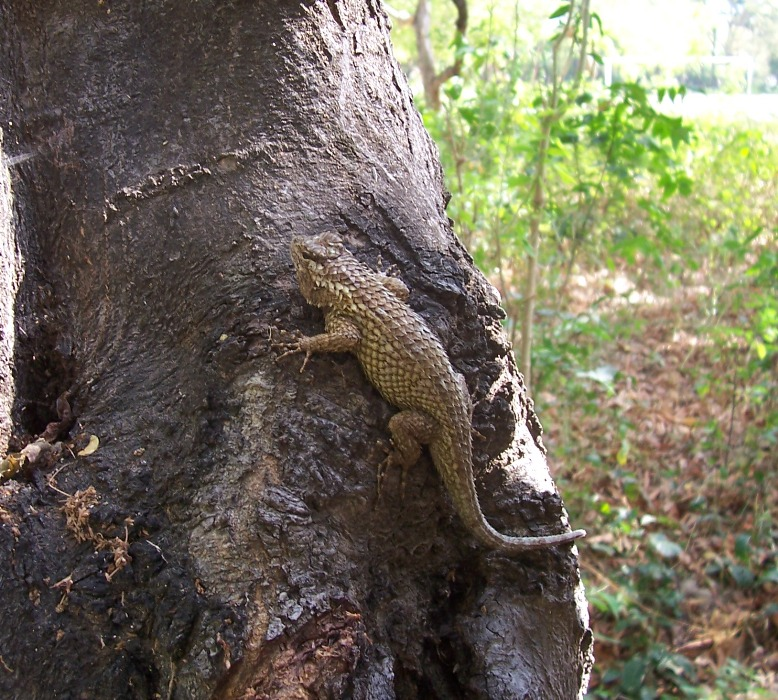

Conservation status
- Least Concern (IUCN 3.1)

Scientific classification
- Domain: Eukaryota
- Kingdom: Animalia
- Phylum: Chordata
- Class: Reptilia
- Order: Squamata
- Suborder: Iguania
- Family: Phrynosomatidae
- Genus: Sceloporus
- Species: S. melanorhinus

Binomial name
- Sceloporus melanorhinus Bocourt, 1876

= Sceloporus melanorhinus =

Species of lizard

Sceloporus melanorhinus, the pastel tree lizard, black-nosed lizard, or southern black-nosed lizard, is a species of lizard in the family Phrynosomatidae. It is found in Mexico and Guatemala.
