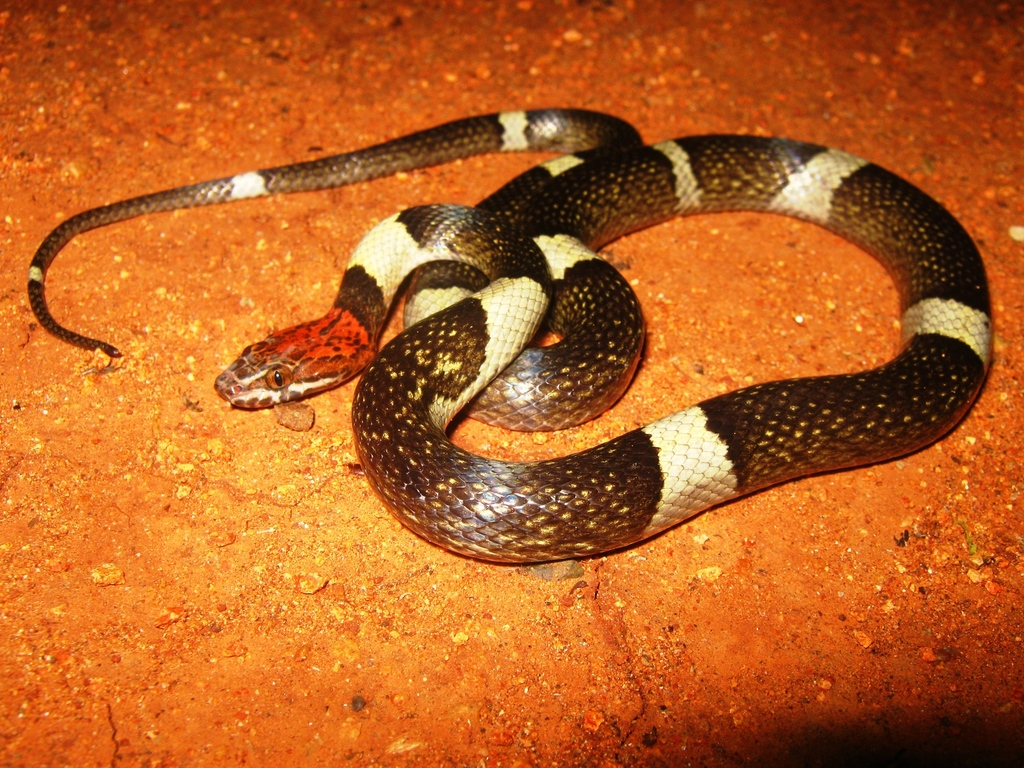

Conservation status
- Least Concern (IUCN 3.1)

Scientific classification
- Kingdom: Animalia
- Phylum: Chordata
- Class: Reptilia
- Order: Squamata
- Suborder: Serpentes
- Family: Colubridae
- Genus: Pseudoleptodeira; Taylor, 1939
- Species: P. latifasciata

Binomial name
- Pseudoleptodeira latifasciata (Günther, 1894)

Synonyms
- Hypsiglena latifasciata; Leptodeira latifasciata

= False cat-eyed snake =

Species of snake

The false cat-eyed snake (Pseudoleptodeira latifasciata) is a genus of snake in the family Colubridae.

It is endemic to Mexico.
