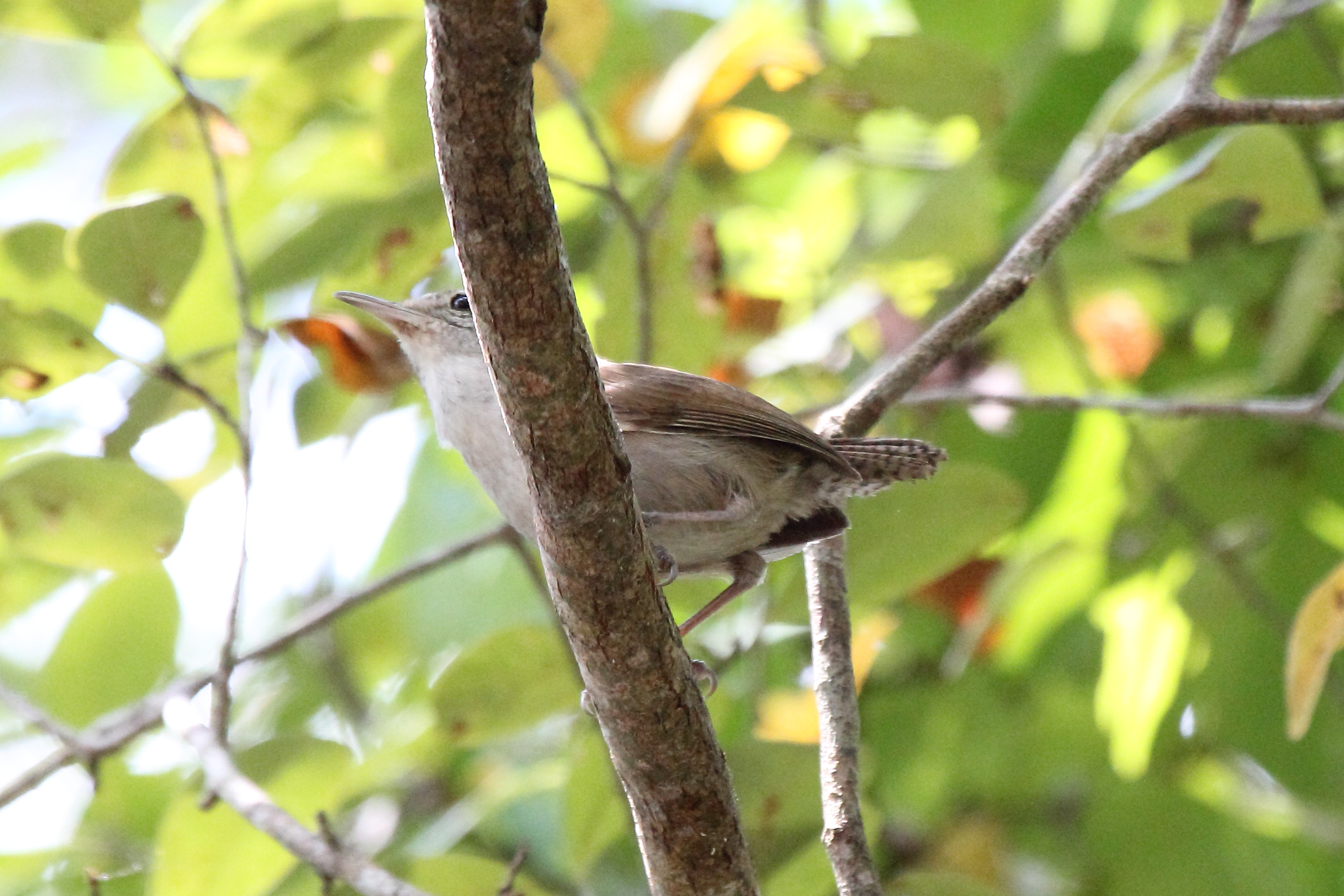

Conservation status
- Least Concern (IUCN 3.1)

Scientific classification
- Kingdom: Animalia
- Phylum: Chordata
- Class: Aves
- Order: Passeriformes
- Family: Troglodytidae
- Genus: Uropsila; P.L. Sclater & Salvin, 1873
- Species: U. leucogastra

Binomial name
- Uropsila leucogastra (Gould, 1837)

= White-bellied wren =

Species of bird

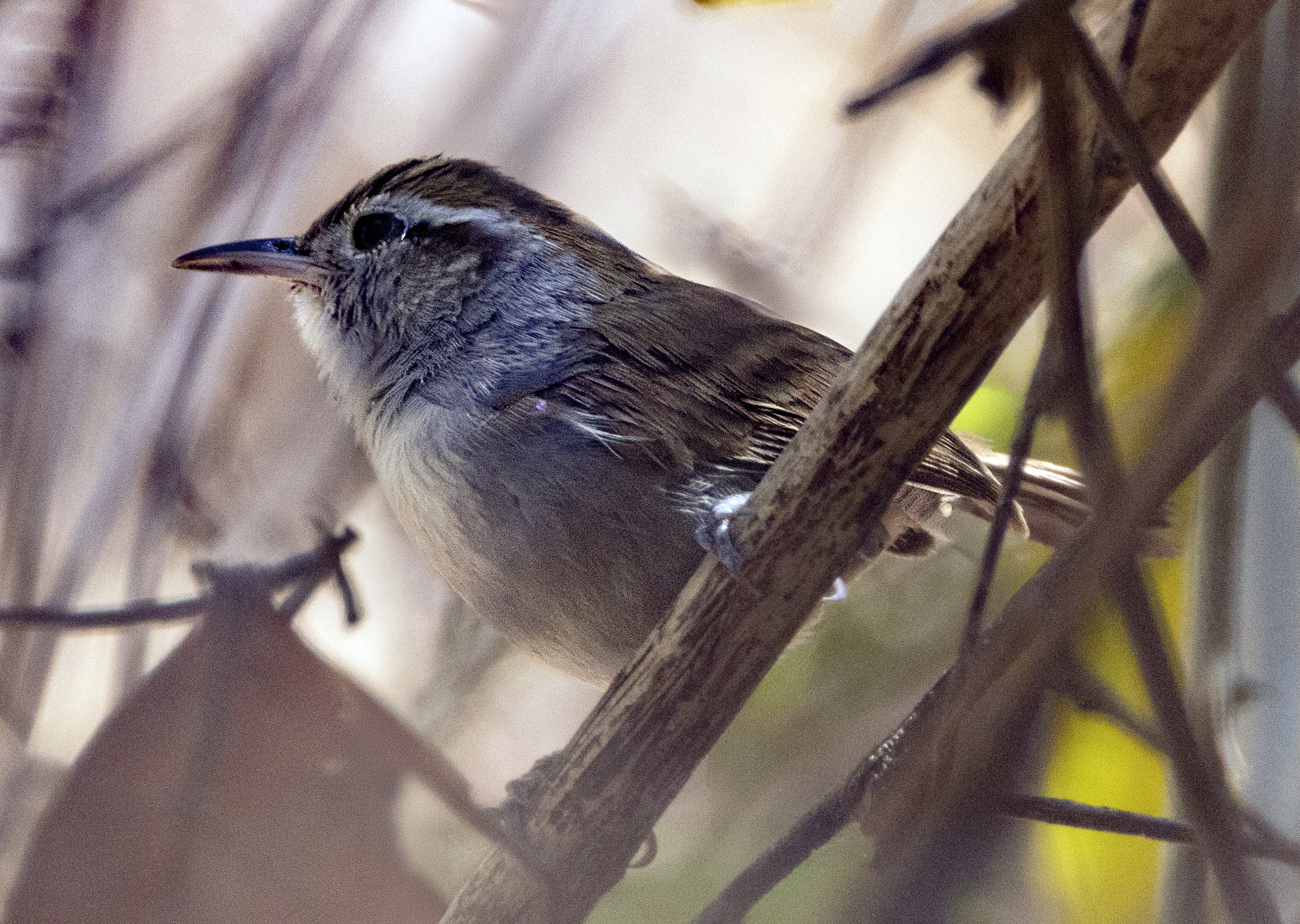
Cabo Corrientes, Jalisco, Mexico

The white-bellied wren (Uropsila leucogastra) is a species of bird in the family Troglodytidae. It is found in Belize, Guatemala, Honduras, and Mexico.

== Taxonomy and systematics ==
The white-bellied wren is the only member of genus Uropsila, but its taxonomy at the subspecies level is uncertain. The International Ornithological Committee (IOC) names five subspecies, the nominate Uropsila leucogastra leucogastra, U. l. pacifica, U. l. centralis, U. l. restricta, and U. l. brachyura. The Handbook of Birds of the World adds U. l. musica. The Cornell Lab of Ornithology's Birds of the World mentions musica in its text but does not list it; it does list two others in addition to the above five, U. l. grisescens and U. l. australis. Cornell qualifies their additions by noting that australis "may be separable" and that grisescens is "doubtfully valid" because it was based on soot-discolored specimens.

== Description ==
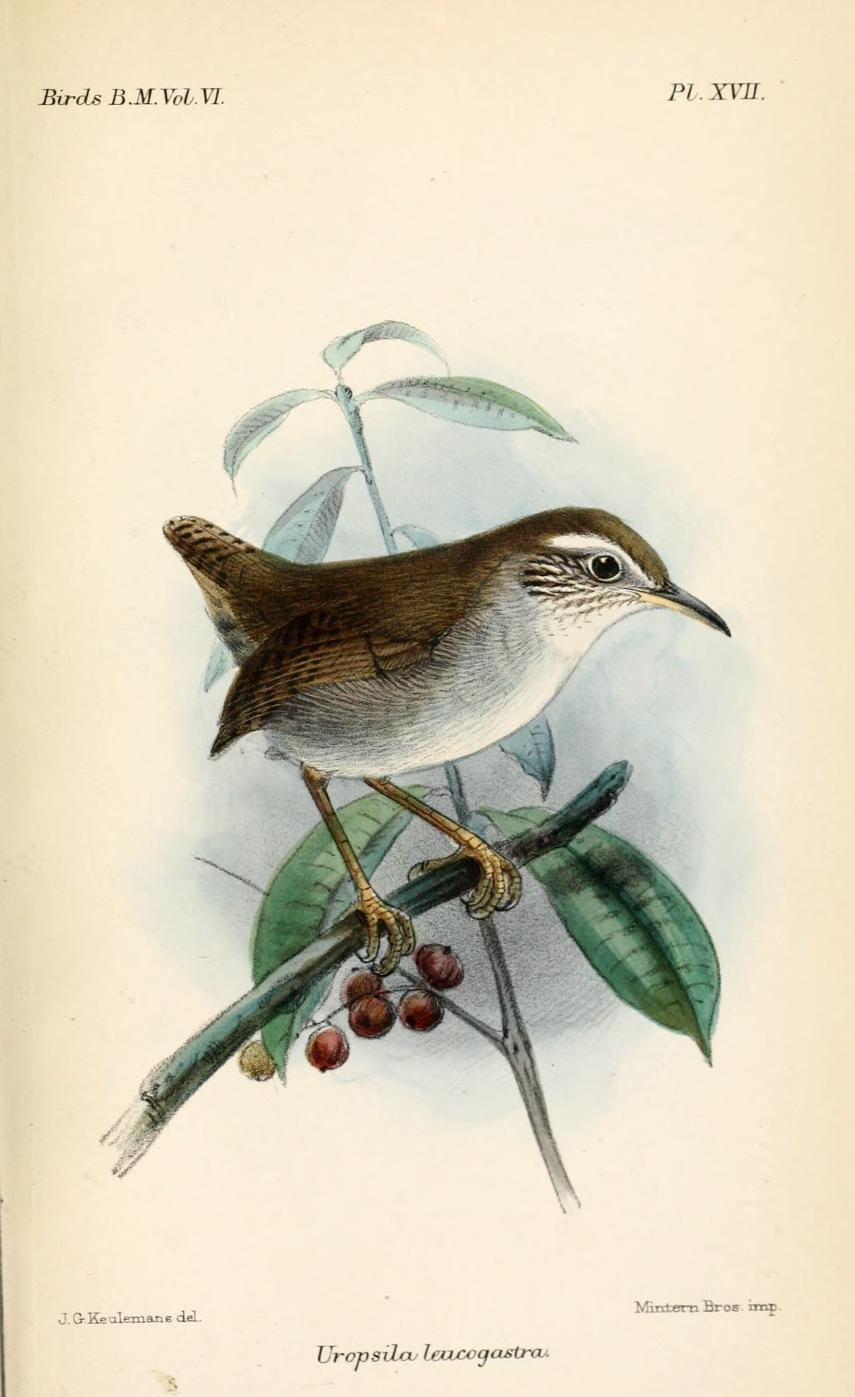

The white-bellied wren is 9.5 to 10 cm (3.7 to 3.9 in) long. Males weigh 9.8 to 10.5 g (0.35 to 0.37 oz) and females 8 to 9.1 g (0.28 to 0.32 oz). The nominate subspecies has a medium brown crown, upperparts, and tail; the rump is slightly reddish and the tail has many thin dark bars. It has a gray-white supercilium, a medium brown stripe behind the eye, and gray cheeks mottled with brown. Its throat, chest, and upper belly are gray and the flanks and vent area buff. The other subspecies differ somewhat in the intensity of the brown of the upperparts and the bars on the tail.

== Distribution and habitat ==
The white-bellied wren has two widely separated populations. U. l. pacifica is found in western Mexico from southern Nayarit south into Guerrero. The other subspecies are found from southern Tamaulipas in northeastern Mexico south into the Yucatan Peninsula, Belize, and northern Guatemala, and (slightly separately) in northern Honduras.

The white-bellied wren inhabits a range of woodland types from the semi-arid forest of western Mexico to the humid rainforest of the Yucatan Peninsula. In northeastern Mexico it frequents thickets of wild pineapple (Bromelia pinguin). In elevation it ranges from sea level to 500 m (1,600 ft).

== Behavior ==
=== Feeding ===
The white-bellied wren forages for insects and spiders in vegetation "from ground level to a considerable height". In the southern part of its range it joins mixed-species flocks following army ant swarms.

=== Breeding ===
The white-bellied wren's breeding season extends from at least late March to June. Its nest is shaped like a chemical retort, an oval ball with a downward pointing funnel entrance. It is woven from fine grass and "decorated" with lichens, moss, and other materials. It is usually placed in a spiny location such as a Bromelia thicket or an Acacia tree. The clutch size is usually four eggs. Both sexes apparently incubate the eggs and both do feed the young.

=== Vocalization ===
The white-bellied wren's song is "a short series of 6 rapid up-and-down notes, descending at end", rather bubbly in the eastern population but not the western. Its calls include a "low 'chek', scolding chatter, and hard dry cracking rattle."

== Status ==
The IUCN has assessed the white-bellied wren as being of Least Concern. It is reasonably common in much of its range, tolerates some habitat disturbance, and is found in several protected areas.
