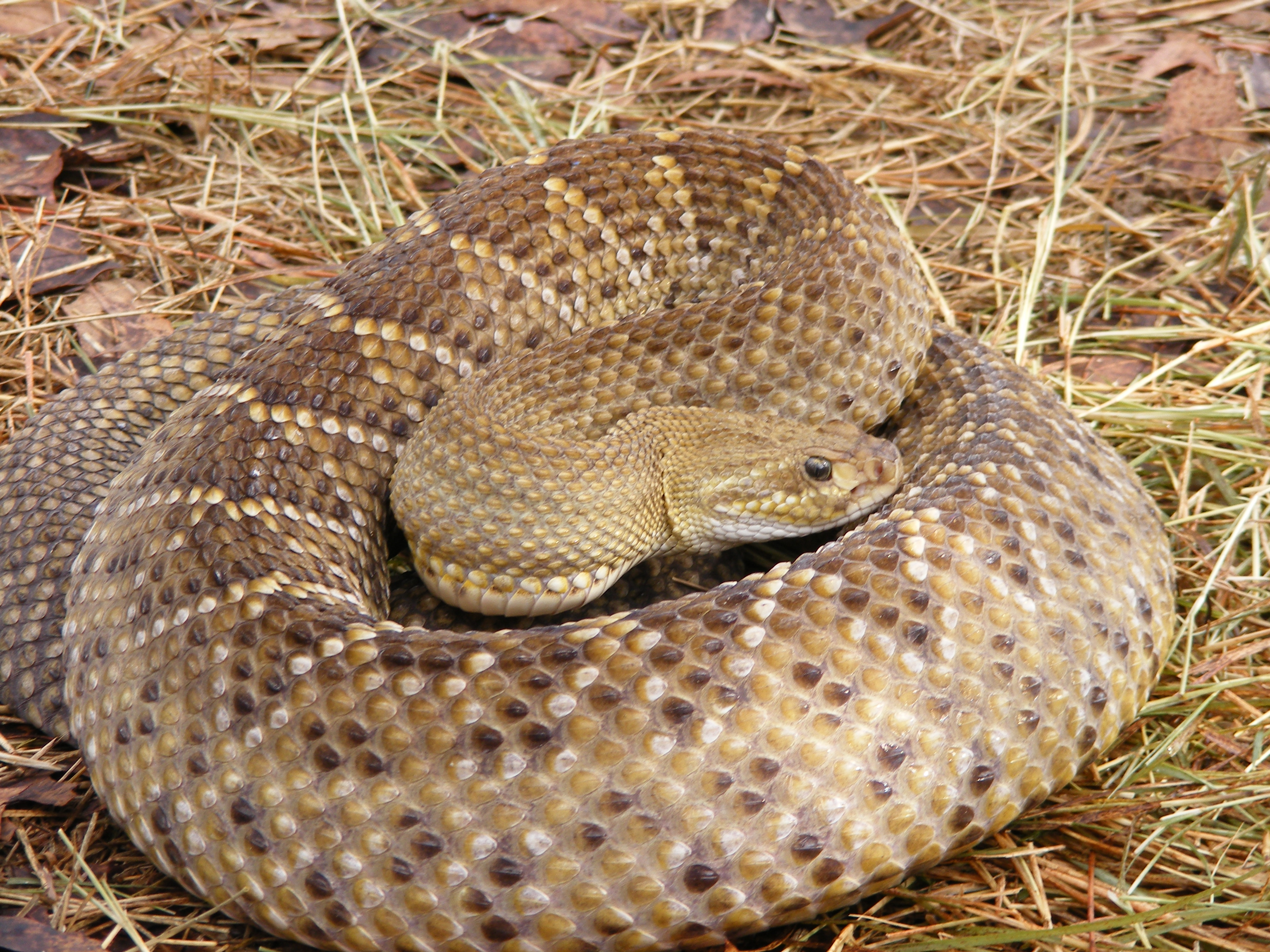

Conservation status
- Least Concern (IUCN 3.1)

Scientific classification
- Kingdom: Animalia
- Phylum: Chordata
- Class: Reptilia
- Order: Squamata
- Suborder: Serpentes
- Family: Viperidae
- Genus: Crotalus
- Species: C. basiliscus

Binomial name
- Crotalus basiliscus (Cope, 1864)
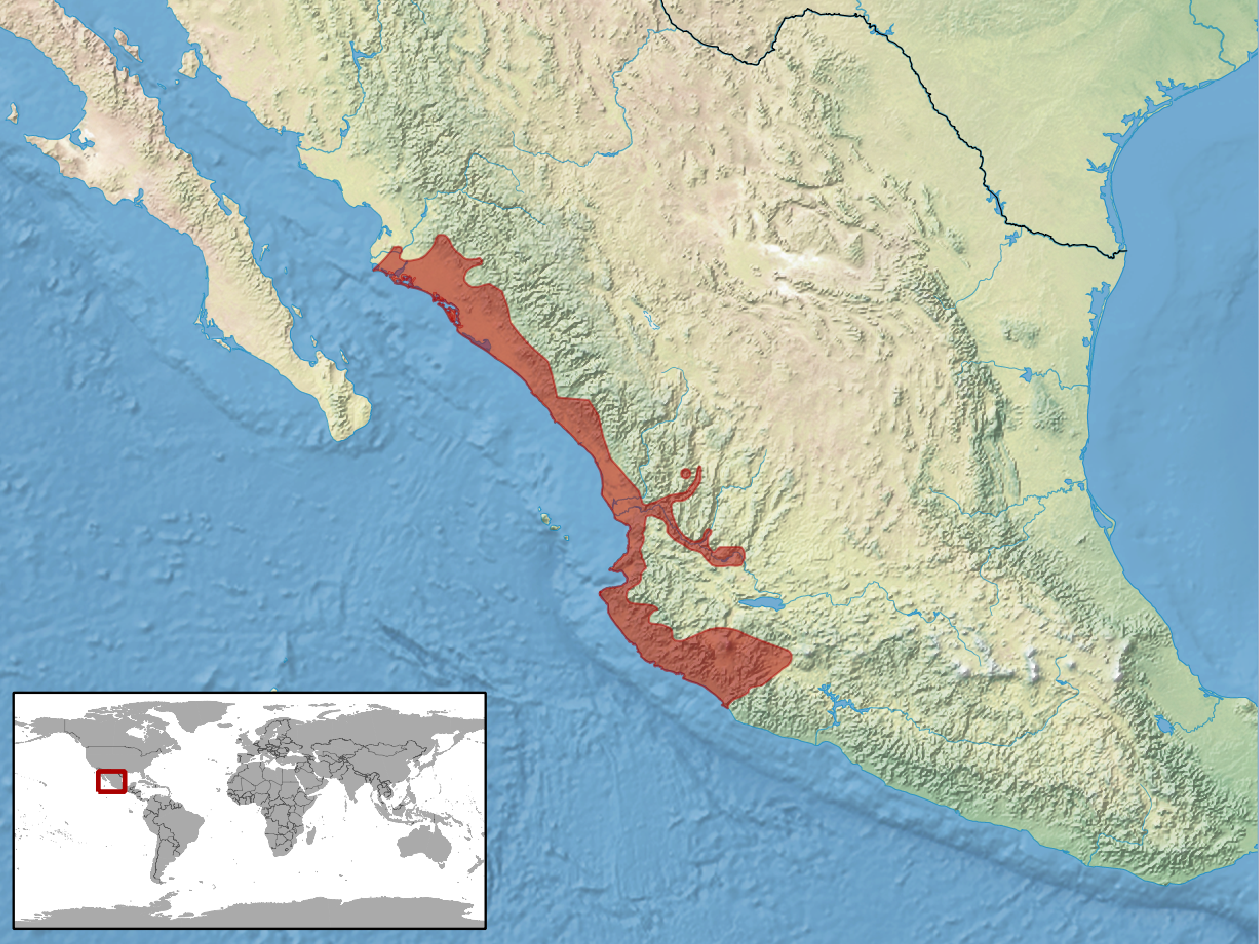

Synonyms
- Caudisona basilisca Cope, 1864; C[rotalus]. basiliscus — Cope in Yarrow in Wheeler, 1875; [Crotalus durissus] var. basiliscus — Garman, 1884; Crotalus terrificus — Boulenger, 1896; [Crotalus terrificus] basiliscus — Amaral, 1929; Crotalus basiliscus basiliscus — Gloyd, 1948

= Crotalus basiliscus =

Species of snake

Crotalus basiliscus, known as the Mexican west coast rattlesnake, Mexican green rattler, and also by other names, is a species of pit viper in the family Viperidae. The species is endemic to western Mexico. Like all other pit vipers, it is venomous. The specific name, basiliscus, is derived from the Greek word for king, βασιλισκος (basiliskos), and alludes to this snake's large size and potent venom. No subspecies are currently recognized.

== Description ==
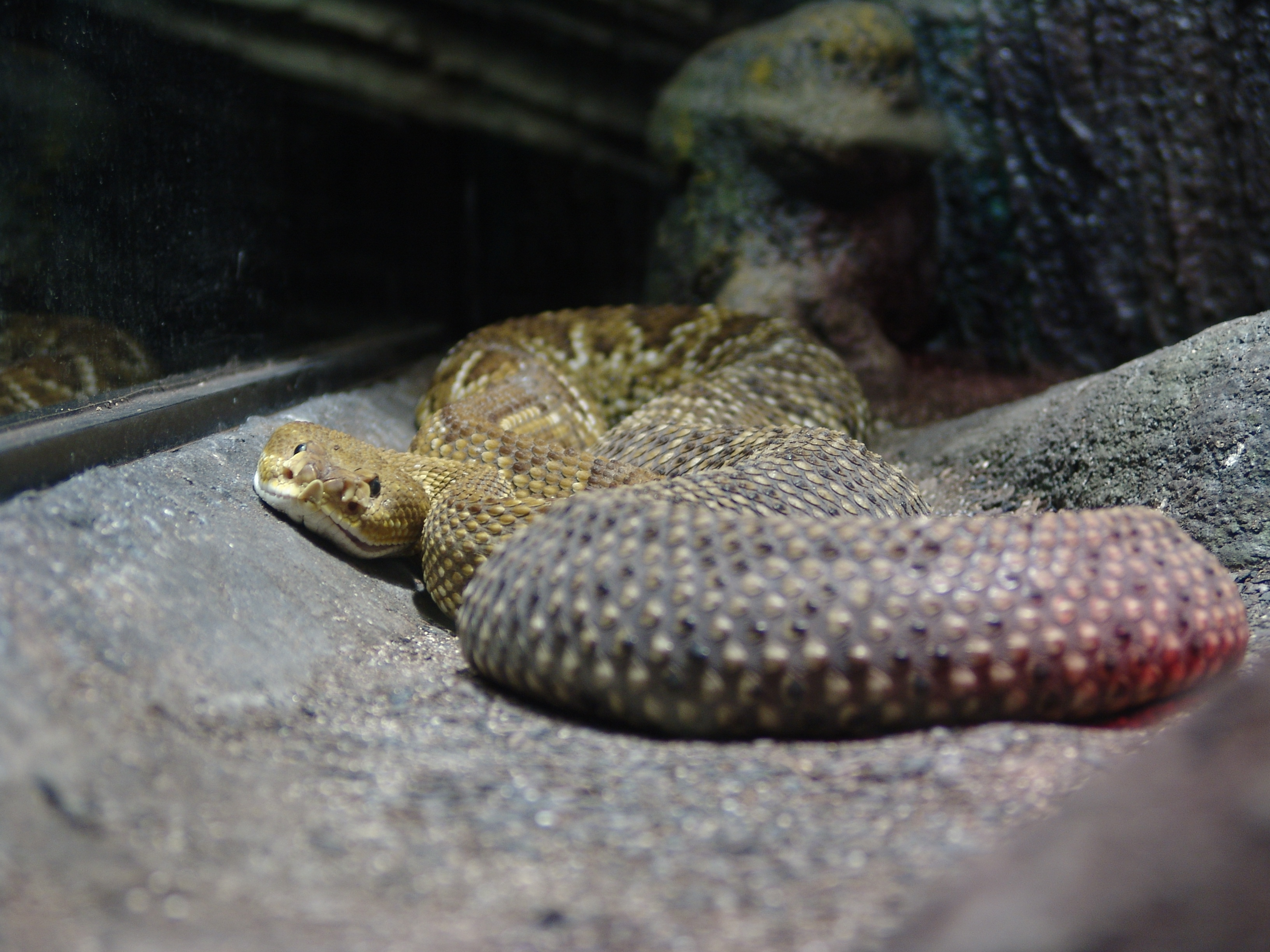
C. basiliscus at Wilmington Serpentarium in North Carolina, United States

C. basiliscus is one of the largest rattlesnake species. Specimens exceeding 150 cm (4.9 ft) are not uncommon, while the maximum size reported is 204.5 cm (6.71 ft) (Klauber, 1972). The body is moderately stout and rather rectangular in cross section. Female rattlesnakes of the species are mature at a minimum length of 100 cm (3.3 ft) and a weight of 700 g (1.5 lb).

At midbody, 25-29 rows of strongly keeled dorsal scales occur. The ventral scales number 174-206 and the subcaudals 18-36.

The color pattern consists of brown or grayish ground color overlaid with 26-41 dark, rhombus-shaped (diamond) blotches with light edges. The head is a uniform grayish-brown except for its lighter labial scales and dark postorbital bar. No distinct pattern is found on the crown or neck areas. The tail may be gray, with darker bands, or almost uniform in color without any distinct markings. The belly is white or cream-colored. The young are mostly red, but adults eventually become an olive green. Within its range, this is the only rattlesnake with diamond-shaped dorsal markings.

This snake often occurs in the same areas as C. molossus, where the two appear to hybridize freely. While these two species are easily distinguished, identifying the hybrid specimens is problematic.

== Common names ==
Common names for C. basiliscus include Mexican west coast rattlesnake, Mexican green rattler, Mexican west coast green rattlesnake, and in Spanish cascabel verde mexicana.

== Geographic range ==
This rattler, C. basiliscus, is found in western Mexico from southern Sonora to Michoacán, where it is mostly restricted to the coastal plain. The type locality given is "Near Colima, Mexico".

== Habitat ==
Around Colima, where C. basiliscus is (or was at one point) particularly plentiful, the area has been described as mostly treeless and covered with short grass with scattered clumps of mesquite, acacias, and other thorny bushes, as well as plenty of large cacti. The habitat of C. basiliscus is mostly tropical thorn forest, with an extension into tropical deciduous forest.

== Conservation status ==
The species C. basiliscus is classified as Least Concern on the IUCN Red List (v3.1, 2001). Species are listed as such due to their wide distribution, presumed large population, or because they are unlikely to be declining fast enough to qualify for listing in a more threatened category. The trend for this species was stable when assessed in 2007.

== Behavior ==
In the lowlands, C. basiliscus is primarily active during the rainy summer months, and most specimens are found crossing the roads at night. However, a few have been seen basking early in the morning. It has been reported to tame quickly in captivity.

== Feeding ==
Klauber reported that the stomachs of seven specimens of C. basiliscus contained mammal hair, probably belonging to rodents.

== Venom ==
Crotalus basilicus is known to produce large amounts of highly toxic venom, and large specimens should be regarded as very dangerous.

Brown (1973) mentioned an average venom yield of 297 mg (dried venom), as well as LD_{50} values of 11.1 mg/kg IV and 4.0 and 12.9 mg/kg IP.

In some populations, the venom may contain a component structurally related to Mojave toxin. The venom also contains proteases. Antivenin is produced by the Instituto Nacional de Higiene in Mexico. In the US, Protherics in Brentwood, Tennessee, produces an antivenin called "Crotalidae Polyvalent Immune Fab (Ovine)" containing a paraspecific antibody that protects against bites from this snake.

== Taxonomy ==
Before 1989, two subspecies were recognized: C. b. basiliscus and C. b. oaxacus. In that year, the latter was transferred to C. molossus by Campbell and Lamar. Occasionally, one may also encounter references to another subspecies, C. b. totonacus (Gloyd & Kauffeld, 1940), found in northeastern Mexico. It was more commonly considered to be a subspecies of C. durissus, until it was elevated to a full species by Campbell and Lamar (2004): Crotalus totonacus.
