= Haplolobus =

Haplolobus may refer to:

- Haplolobus (plant), a plant genus in the family Burseraceae
- Haplolobus (beetle), a beetle genus in the tribe Tropiphorini
