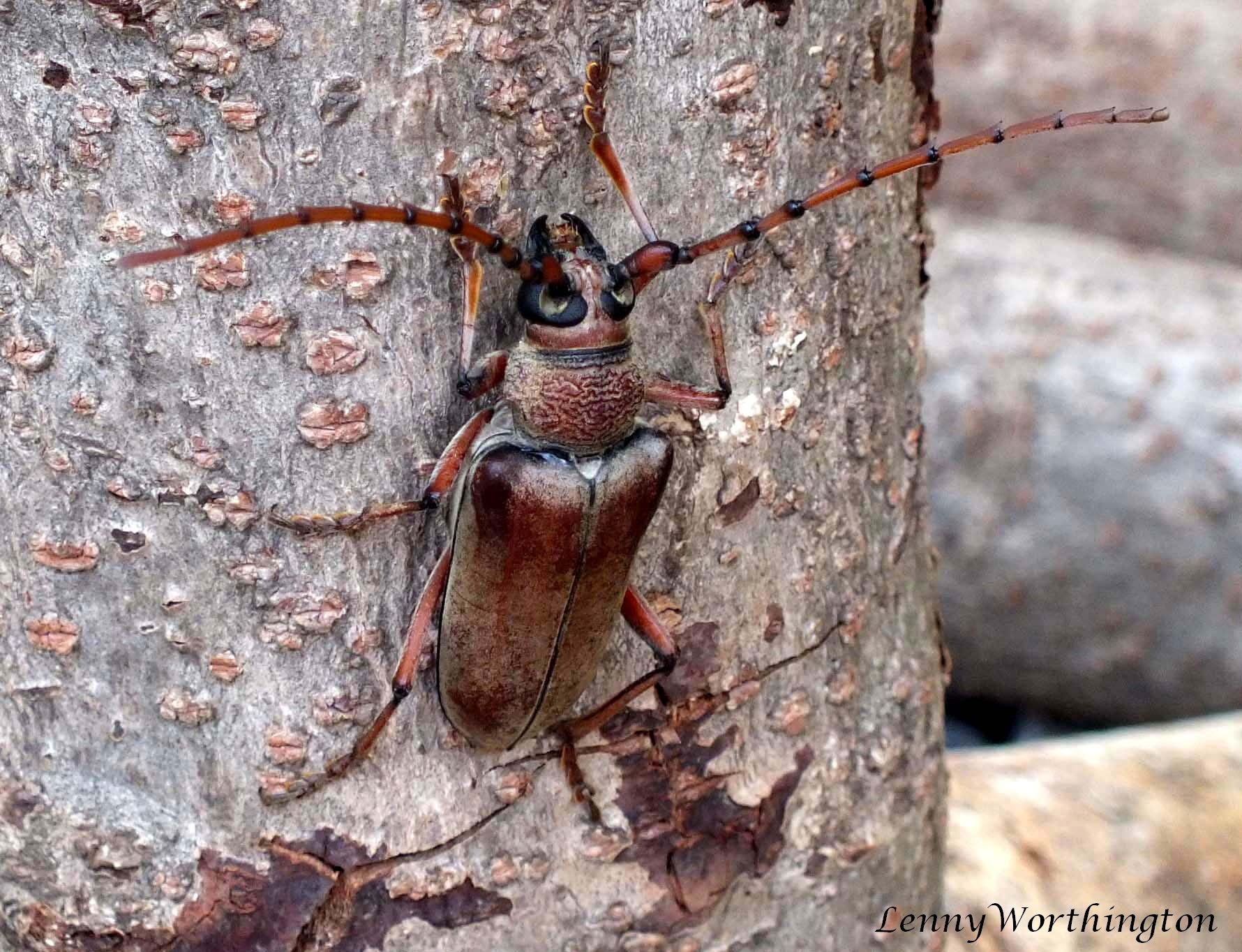
- Neoplocaederus obesus, Thailand

Scientific classification
- Kingdom: Animalia
- Phylum: Arthropoda
- Class: Insecta
- Order: Coleoptera
- Suborder: Polyphaga
- Infraorder: Cucujiformia
- Family: Cerambycidae
- Genus: Neoplocaederus
- Species: N. obesus

Binomial name
- Neoplocaederus obesus (Gahan, 1890)

Synonyms
- Hammaticherus obesus Dejean, 1837; Cerambyx obesus Gemminger & Harold, 1872; Plocederus pedestris Cotes, 1889; Plocaederus obesus Gahan, 1890; Plocaederus obesus Khan, 1985; Plocaederus obesus Gahan, 1906; Plocaederus obesus Holzschuh, 1977; Neoplocaederus obesus Lobl & Smetana, 2010

= Neoplocaederus obesus =

Species of beetle

Neoplocaederus obesus, commonly known as cashew stem borer or red cocoon-making longhorn, is a species of longhorn beetle native to South Asian and South East Asian countries.

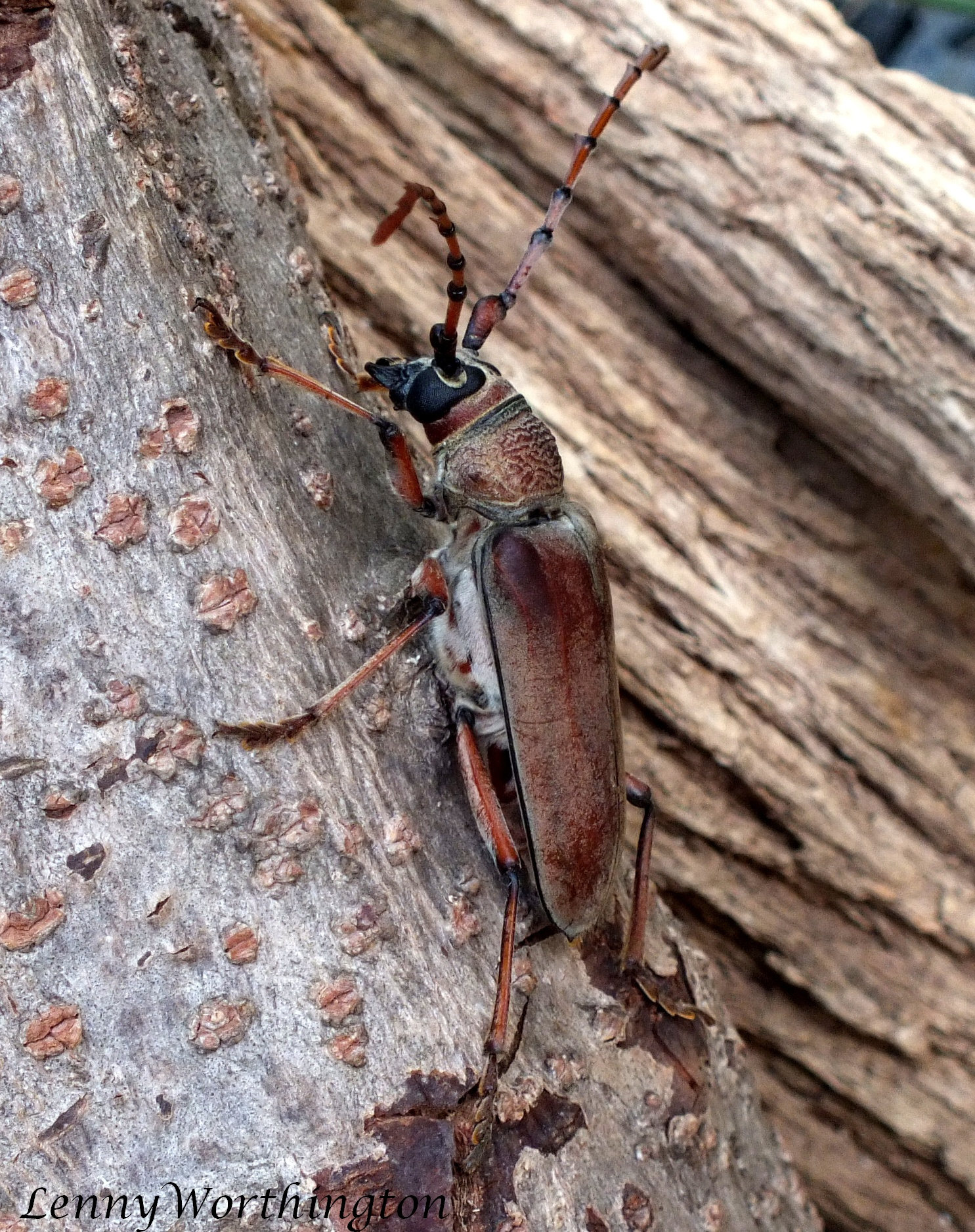
Neoplocaederus obesus, Thailand, side view

== Distribution ==
It is found in Sri Lanka, India, Andaman, Nicobar, Bangladesh, Myanmar, Thailand, Vietnam, Laos, China, Taiwan, and Bhutan.

== Biology ==
Male is usually smaller in size with 38 mm and female is approximately 40 mm.

Particularly as sap wood borer, the female lays about 40–50 eggs in the live tissues or in the crevices of the bark at the collar region. Grubs then bore into the fresh tissues of the bark and gradually move through the sap wood by making tunnels. Finally they reach roots. Grubs feed the internal tissues for about 3–6 months. Pupal stage is about 3 to 4 months. Adults are visible from January to May usually emerged with pre monsoon rains.

== Host plants ==
- Anacardium occidentale
- Boswellia serrata
- Buchanania lanzan
- Bombax malabaricum
- Bombax heptaphyllum
- Butea monosperma
- Butea frondosa
- Caryota urens
- Cedrela toona
- Ceiba pentandra
- Cordia dichotoma
- Dracontomelon dao
- Eriodendron anfractuosum
- Garuga pinnata
- Gmelina arborea
- Kydia calycina
- Lannea coromandelica
- Mangifera indica
- Odina wodier
- Protium serratum
- Pterocarpus marsupium
- Salmalia malabarica
- Shorea robusta
- Spondias mangifera
- Sterculia colorata
- Sterculia urens
- Sterculia villosa
- Terminalia tomentosa
