= Protium confusum =

Conservation status
- Vulnerable (IUCN 2.3)

Scientific classification
- Kingdom: Plantae
- Clade: Tracheophytes
- Clade: Angiosperms
- Clade: Eudicots
- Clade: Rosids
- Order: Sapindales
- Family: Burseraceae
- Genus: Protium
- Species: P. confusum

Binomial name
- Protium confusum (Rose) Pittier (1923)

Synonyms
- Icica confusa Rose (1911); Protium copal var. inconforme (Pittier) Swart (1942); Protium correae D.M.Porter (1971 publ. 1972); Protium inconforme Pittier (1922); Protium schippii Lundell (1937)

Species of flowering plant

Protium confusum is a species of plant in the Burseraceae family. It is a tree native to southeastern Mexico, Guatemala, Belize, Honduras, Nicaragua, Costa Rica, and Panama. It is threatened by habitat loss.
