= Santiria griffithii =

Conservation status
- Least Concern (IUCN 2.3)

Scientific classification
- Kingdom: Plantae
- Clade: Tracheophytes
- Clade: Angiosperms
- Clade: Eudicots
- Clade: Rosids
- Order: Sapindales
- Family: Burseraceae
- Genus: Santiria
- Species: S. griffithii

Binomial name
- Santiria griffithii (Hook. f.) Engl.

Species of flowering plant

Santiria griffithii is a species of plant in the Burseraceae family. It is found in Indonesia, Malaysia, and Singapore.
