= Santiria impressinervis =

Conservation status
- Vulnerable (IUCN 2.3)

Scientific classification
- Kingdom: Plantae
- Clade: Tracheophytes
- Clade: Angiosperms
- Clade: Eudicots
- Clade: Rosids
- Order: Sapindales
- Family: Burseraceae
- Genus: Santiria
- Species: S. impressinervis

Binomial name
- Santiria impressinervis Kochummen

Species of tree

Santiria impressinervis is a species of plant in the family Burseraceae. It is endemic to the Kelabit Highlands in the Malaysian region of Sarawak on the island of Borneo.
