= Protium panamense =

Conservation status
- Least Concern (IUCN 3.1)

Scientific classification
- Kingdom: Plantae
- Clade: Tracheophytes
- Clade: Angiosperms
- Clade: Eudicots
- Clade: Rosids
- Order: Sapindales
- Family: Burseraceae
- Genus: Protium
- Species: P. panamense

Binomial name
- Protium panamense (Rose) I.M. Johnston

Species of flowering plant

Protium panamense is a species of plant in the Burseraceae family. It is found in Costa Rica and Panama. It is becoming rare due to habitat loss.
