= Protium attenuatum =

Conservation status
- Endangered (IUCN 3.1)

Scientific classification
- Kingdom: Plantae
- Clade: Tracheophytes
- Clade: Angiosperms
- Clade: Eudicots
- Clade: Rosids
- Order: Sapindales
- Family: Burseraceae
- Genus: Protium
- Species: P. attenuatum

Binomial name
- Protium attenuatum (Rose) Urb.

Synonyms
- Icica attenuata Rose

Species of flowering plant

Protium attenuatum is a species of plant in the Burseraceae family. It is found in Dominica, Guadeloupe, Jamaica, Martinique, Saint Kitts and Nevis, Saint Lucia, and Saint Vincent and the Grenadines.

== Habitat ==
Protium attenuatum is found in mid-elevation forests across the Lesser Antilles of the Eastern Caribbean, demonstrating adaptability to various forest types. It thrives at elevations of 200 to 500 meters above sea level and is associated with forest reserves, emphasizing the need for habitat preservation.

== Distribution ==
Protium attenuatum is endemic to the Lesser Antilles and historically inhabited seven island states. Recent observations show its persistence in Dominica and Saint Lucia within its preferred elevational range. However, the species has experienced distribution contractions on Martinique and Guadeloupe. Concerns arise from recent absence reports in Grenada, Saint Kitts and Nevis, and St Vincent and the Grenadines, suggesting population declines or possible extinction in these regions.

== Conservation ==
The conservation of Protium attenuatum, is of concern due to its declining population trend. In regions like Dominica, where it was once locally common, and in Grenada, where it is likely extinct, the species underscores the urgent need for protective measures. Guadeloupe, Martinique, and St Vincent and the Grenadines report decreasing populations, further emphasizing the species' vulnerability. The significant reduction in the species' area of occupancy by approximately 60% since the 1940s highlights the pressing need for conservation initiatives to safeguard Protium attenuatum from further decline and potential extinction.

== Threats ==
Protium attenuatum faces several significant threats that have historical implications and continue to affect its populations across various range states.

Unsustainable extraction of lansan resin for domestic use and trade has been a historical cause of decline in Protium attenuatum populations, and it remains a persistent and substantial threat. In heavily exploited areas on Saint Lucia, reports indicate higher rates of tree mortalities and reduced regeneration. Additionally, evidence suggests the spread of disease from tapped to non-tapped trees, further contributing to the threat.

Habitat loss and deforestation represent ongoing threats in certain range states. In the past, more than half of Protium attenuatum forest habitat was cleared for agricultural purposes, particularly for banana plantations during the 'banana boom' from the 1960s to the 1990s. On Martinique, for instance, the speciewass common in the 1950s and 1960s, but much of its forest habitat was transformed into mahogany plantations. While deforestation rates have slowed, they remain significant in some range states. Dominica, for instance, reportedly lost 10% of its forest cover between 1990 and 2010, with marijuana cultivation posing an additional threat to Protium attenuatum forests in parts of Saint Lucia and Saint Vincent.

The potential effects of climate change on Protium attenuatum are uncertain, but concerns exist. Tropical storms are expected to increase in frequency and severity across its range states, leading to more landslides and uprooted trees. Past hurricanes, such as Category 4 Hurricane Ivan, which killed 90% of trees in Grenada's Grand Etang Forest Reserve in 2004, and Category 5 Hurricane Maria, which caused an estimated 30% tree loss in Dominica in 2017, illustrate the vulnerability of the species to these events. Even Category 2 Hurricane Tomas led to a mortality rate of 4.3% among surveyed Protium attenuatum trees in Saint Lucia in 2010.
