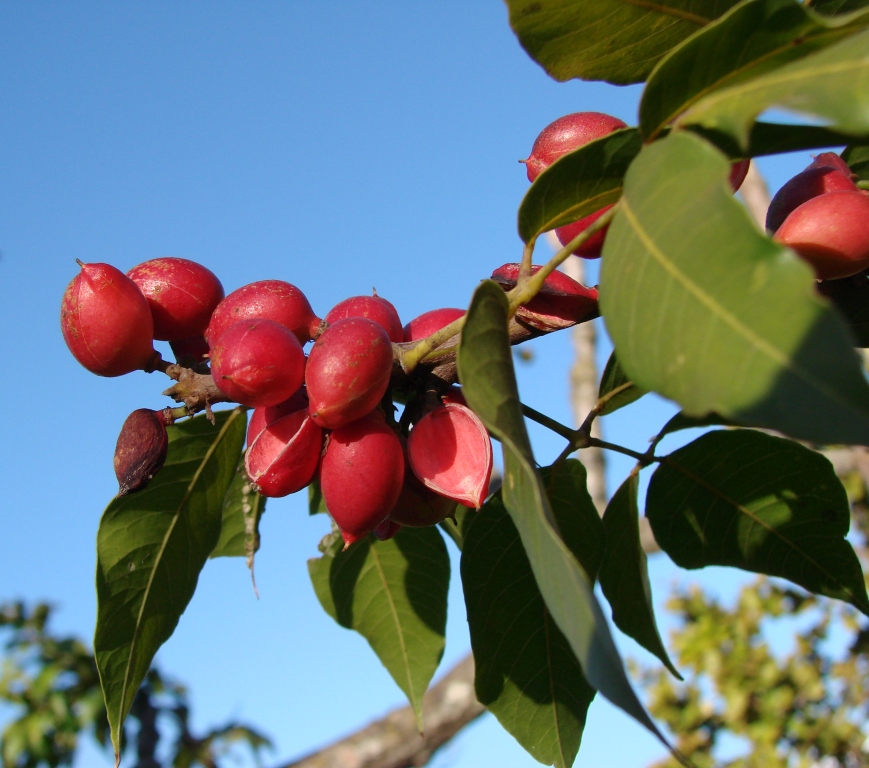
- Branch of Protium heptaphyllum

Scientific classification
- Kingdom: Plantae
- Clade: Tracheophytes
- Clade: Angiosperms
- Clade: Eudicots
- Clade: Rosids
- Order: Sapindales
- Family: Burseraceae
- Genus: Protium
- Species: P. heptaphyllum

Binomial name
- Protium heptaphyllum (Aubl.) Marchand

= Protium heptaphyllum =

Species of plant

Protium heptaphyllum, also known as almécega, breu, and almíscar, is a species of tree from South America commonly found in the areas of Brazil, the Guyanas, and Venezuela. The plant is typically harvested by locals for resin, food, wood, and other medical uses.

== Description ==
Protium heptaphyllum is a large, woody tree that is evergreen and can grow to be 10 to 20 meters tall (32 to 65 feet).

== Ecology ==
Protium heptaphyllum has been found to flourish in Amazonia. The biome that this species occupies is the tropical rainforest. This species can be found sandy soils throughout these regions that are wet. Seed dispersal is carried out by animals in these regions, more specifically leaf-cutting ants. These organisms take leaves from the plants to the fungus they share a symbiotic relationship with. This is not only beneficial to the plant, as this helps the plant get its seeds dispersed, but it also helps the ant keep the symbiotic relationship it carries out with their fungus. These ants are also known to be good pollinators for this species. Studies have not been able to fully understand the relationship between this species and the leaf-cutting ants, but it has been proven that they help with seed-dispersal and pollination. Protium heptaphyllum is a subtropical plant, it can resist temperatures down to 4 degrees Celsius.

== Cultivation ==
Protium heptaphyllum is cultivated throughout Brazil, since it is a plant that adapts to sand and clay soils. This species cannot be cultivated in swampy soils or next to rivers where there is constant flooding.

== Uses ==
Fruit in the months from January to March. The fruits have a sweet and refreshing pulp, which can be consumed fresh. The tree can be planted in squares and large gardens for producing great shade or in revegetation projects for permanent preservation, aiming to provide food for birds and monkeys. The resin has medicinal and insecticidal properties. The wood has a reddish color and is used in civil constructions, floors, carpentry and joinery, its dense canopy provides ornamental purposes to the plant and can be used in urban or rural areas. P. heptaphyllum also releases chemicals from the resin on its leaves that can be used to create essential oils.
