= Pieter Willem Leenhouts =

Dutch botanist

- Born: 1926; Hopkinton, Rhode Island, US
- Died: 1 March 2004 (aged 77–78)
- Scientific career
- Fields: Botany
- Workplaces: Leiden University
- Author abbrev. (botany): Leenh.

Pieter Willem Leenhouts (1926 – 1 March 2004) was a Dutch botanist. He worked at the Rijksherbarium from 1947 until his official retirement in 1991, and then was an honorary member of staff until 1999. He was editor of Blumea from 1973 to 1999.

The standard author abbreviation Leenh. is used to indicate this person as the author when citing a botanical name.

== Eponymy ==
- Burseraceae: Haplolobus leenhoutsii Kochummen
- Loganiaceae: Geniostoma leenhoutsii B.J.Conn
- Loganiaceae: Strychnos leenhoutsii Tirel

== Publications ==
=== Books ===
- 1959. A monograph of the genus Canarium (Burseraceae). Edición reimpresa de Ijdo, 475 pp.
- 1965. Systematisch-morphologische Studien an Terebinthales-Familien: (Bursersaceae, Sapindaceae). Volumen 1965, Nº 10 de Mathematisch-naturwissenschaftlich Klasse. Editor Verlag der Akademie der Wissenschaften und der Literatur, 584 pp.
- 1966. A new Strychnos from Borneo (Loganiaceae). 230 pp
- 1967. Phoenicimon Ridl. (Sapindaceae) is Glycosmis Correa (Rutaceae). 452 pp.
- 1968b. Florae Malesianae Praecursores L.a revision of Lepisanthes ... 59 pp.
- 1968a. A guide to the practice of herbarium taxonomy. Volumen 58 de Regnum vegetabile. Editor Int. Bureau for Plant Taxonomy & Nomenclature, 60 pp.
- 1971. A Revision of Dimocarpus (Sapindaceae). 19 pp.
- 1972. A revision of Haplolobus (Burseraceae). 28 pp.
- 1976. The genus Canarium in the Pacific. Volumen 216 de Bernice P. Bishop Museum bulletin. Edición reimpresa de Kraus Reprint Co. 53 pp.
