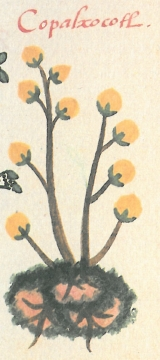
- Libellus de medicinalibus Indorum herbis f. 56v detail copal

Scientific classification
- Kingdom: Plantae
- Clade: Tracheophytes
- Clade: Angiosperms
- Clade: Eudicots
- Clade: Rosids
- Order: Sapindales
- Family: Burseraceae
- Genus: Protium
- Species: P. copal

Binomial name
- Protium copal Engl.

= Protium copal =

Species of tree

Protium copal, commonly known as the copal tree, is a species of tree endemic to Mexico and Central America. It is found in wet tropical forests, preferring heavy shade. It grows to 30 metres (98 ft) in height and has long leathery leaves. The fruits are (2–3 cm) and smooth, with a single pit.

The dried sap of the tree is known as copal. It is commonly used as an incense, similar to frankincense.
