= Haplolobus beccarii =

Conservation status
- Vulnerable (IUCN 2.3)

Scientific classification
- Kingdom: Plantae
- Clade: Tracheophytes
- Clade: Angiosperms
- Clade: Eudicots
- Clade: Rosids
- Order: Sapindales
- Family: Burseraceae
- Genus: Haplolobus
- Species: H. beccarii

Binomial name
- Haplolobus beccarii Husson

Species of tree

Haplolobus beccarii is a species of plant in the Burseraceae family. It is a tree endemic to Borneo where it is confined to Sarawak.
