= Tapirocarpus =

Scientific classification
- Kingdom: Plantae
- Clade: Tracheophytes
- Clade: Angiosperms
- Clade: Eudicots
- Clade: Rosids
- Order: Sapindales
- Family: Burseraceae
- Genus: Tapirocarpus; Sagot

Genus of flowering plants

Tapirocarpus is a genus of flowering plants belonging to the family Burseraceae.

Its native range is Guyana.

Species:

- Tapirocarpus talisia Sagot
