= Protium connarifolium =

Conservation status
- Vulnerable (IUCN 2.3)

Scientific classification
- Kingdom: Plantae
- Clade: Tracheophytes
- Clade: Angiosperms
- Clade: Eudicots
- Clade: Rosids
- Order: Sapindales
- Family: Burseraceae
- Genus: Protium
- Species: P. connarifolium

Binomial name
- Protium connarifolium (Perk.) Merr.

Species of flowering plant

Protium connarifolium is a species of plant in the Burseraceae family. It is found in Malaysia and the Philippines.
