= Haplolobus leenhoutsii =

Conservation status
- Vulnerable (IUCN 2.3)

Scientific classification
- Kingdom: Plantae
- Clade: Embryophytes
- Clade: Tracheophytes
- Clade: Spermatophytes
- Clade: Angiosperms
- Clade: Eudicots
- Clade: Rosids
- Order: Sapindales
- Family: Burseraceae
- Genus: Haplolobus
- Species: H. leenhoutsii

Binomial name
- Haplolobus leenhoutsii Kochummen

Species of flowering plant

Haplolobus leenhoutsii is a species of plant in the Burseraceae family. It is endemic to Borneo where it is confined to Sarawak.

The species epithet, leenhoutsii, honours Pieter Willem Leenhouts.
