= Caranna =

Tree gum

Caranna is a hard, brittle, resinous gum, obtained from the West Indian tree Bursera acuminata (family Amyridaceae) and the South American trees Protium (plant) carana, P. altissimum, and Pachylobus hexandrus. It has an aromatic flavor, and was used in pre-modern medicine.
