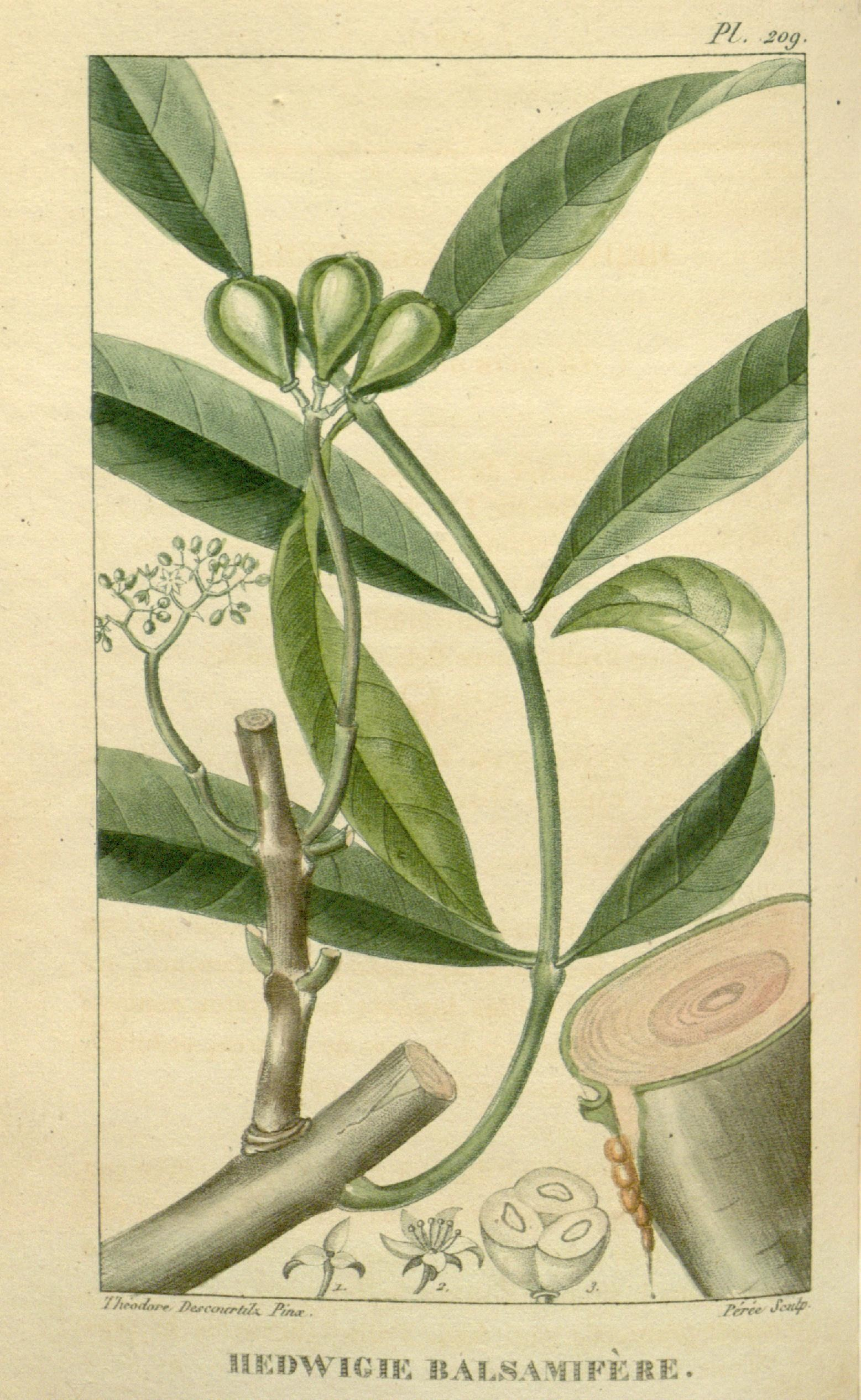
- Tetragastris balsamifera

Scientific classification
- Kingdom: Plantae
- Clade: Tracheophytes
- Clade: Angiosperms
- Clade: Eudicots
- Clade: Rosids
- Order: Sapindales
- Family: Burseraceae
- Genus: Tetragastris; Gaertn.

= Tetragastris =

Genus of flowering plants

Tetragastris is a genus of plants in family Burseraceae. It contains the following species (but this list may be incomplete):

- Tetragastris altissima (Aubl.) Swart
- Tetragastris breviacuminata Swart
- Tetragastris catuaba Soares da Cunha
- Tetragastris hostmannii (Engl.) Kuntze
- Tetragastris mucronata (Rusby) Swart
- Tetragastris occhionii (Rizzini) D.C. Daly
- Tetragastris panamensis (Engl.) Kuntze
- Tetragastris tomentosa D.M.Porter
- Tetragastris varians Little
