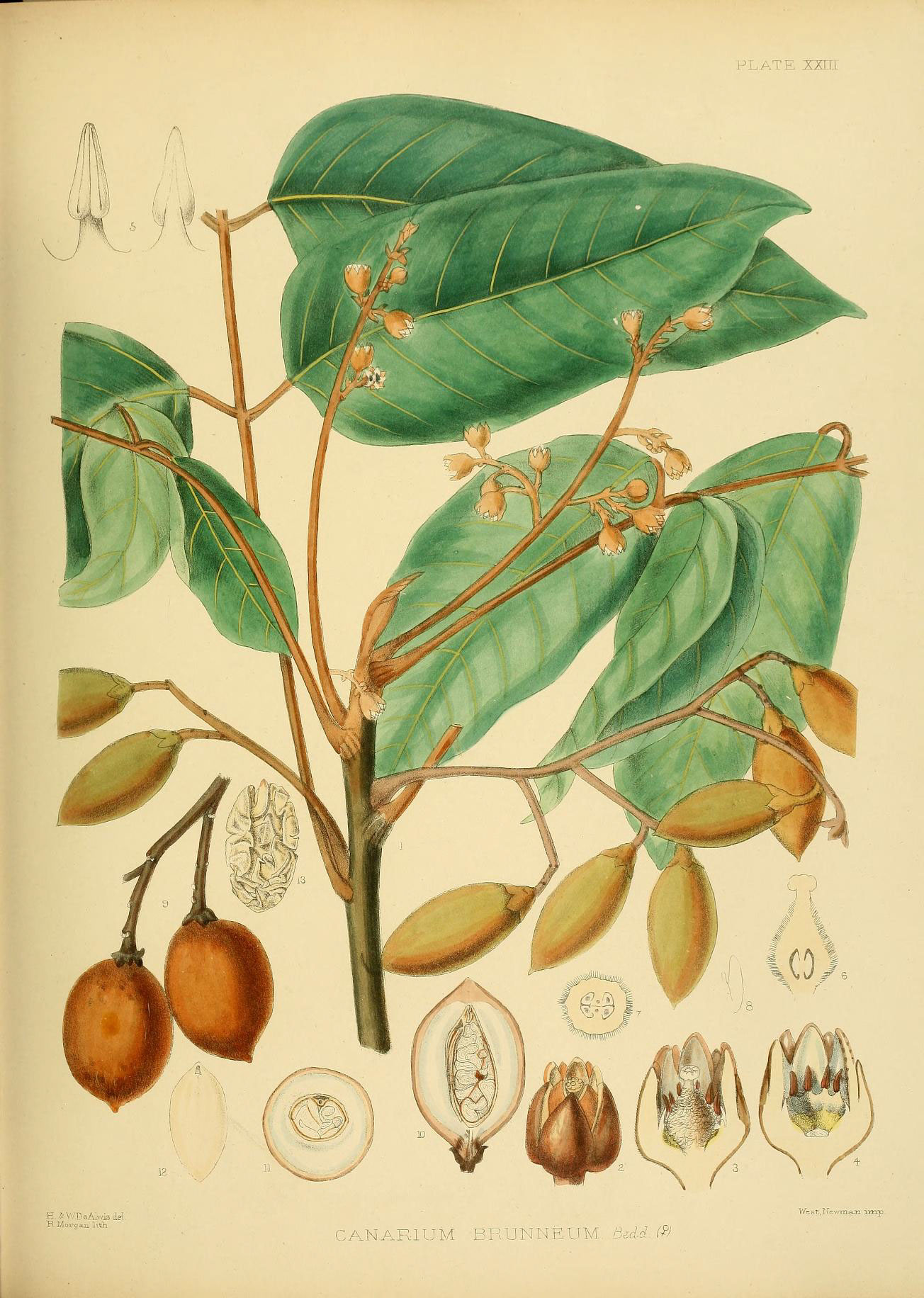

Conservation status
- Least Concern (IUCN 2.3)

Scientific classification
- Kingdom: Plantae
- Clade: Tracheophytes
- Clade: Angiosperms
- Clade: Eudicots
- Clade: Rosids
- Order: Sapindales
- Family: Burseraceae
- Genus: Scutinanthe
- Species: S. brunnea

Binomial name
- Scutinanthe brunnea Thwaites

= Scutinanthe brunnea =

Species of flowering plant

Scutinanthe brunnea is a species of plant in the Burseraceae family. It is found in Brunei, Indonesia, Malaysia, and Sri Lanka.
