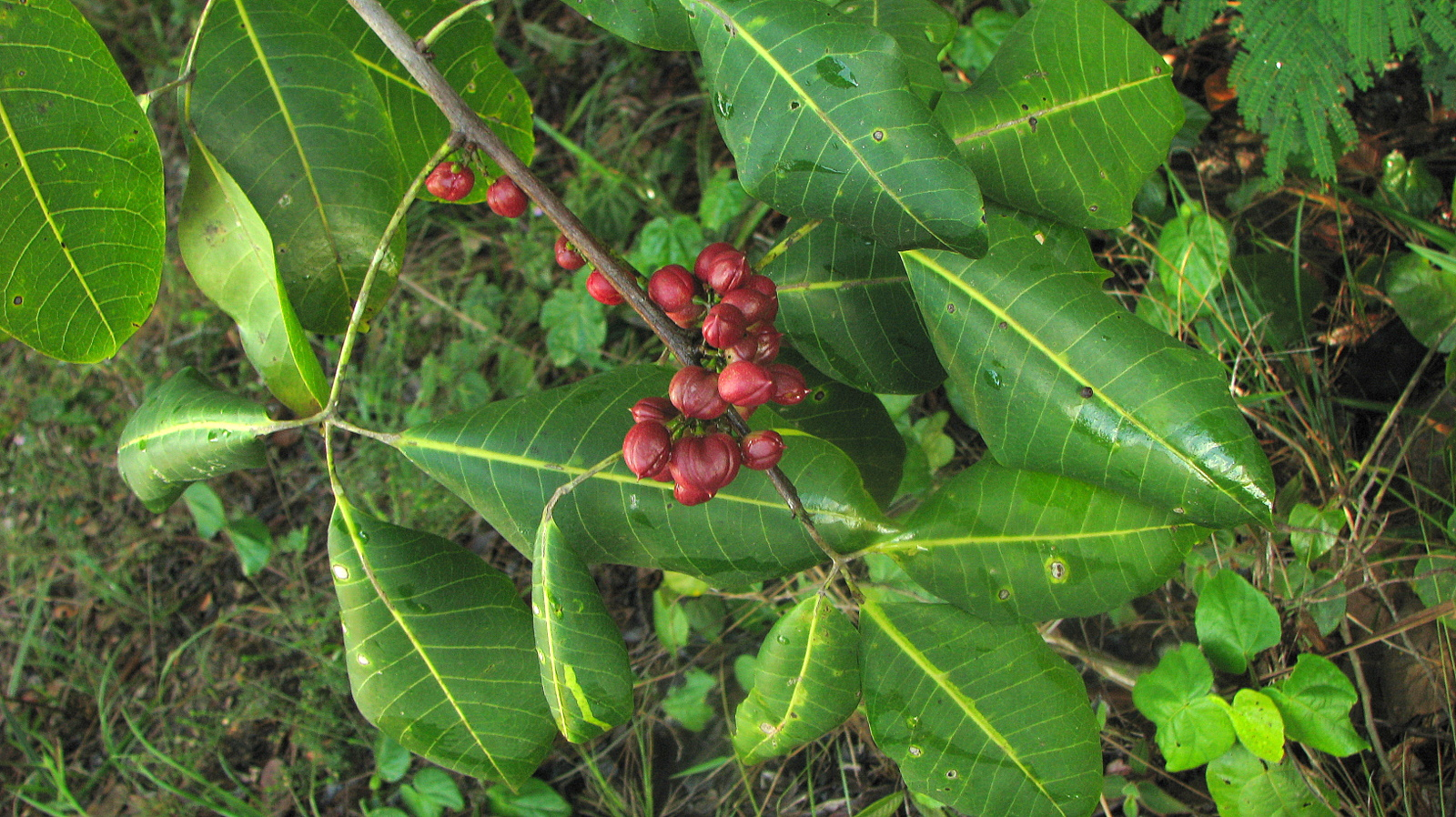
- Protium icicariba var. talmonii
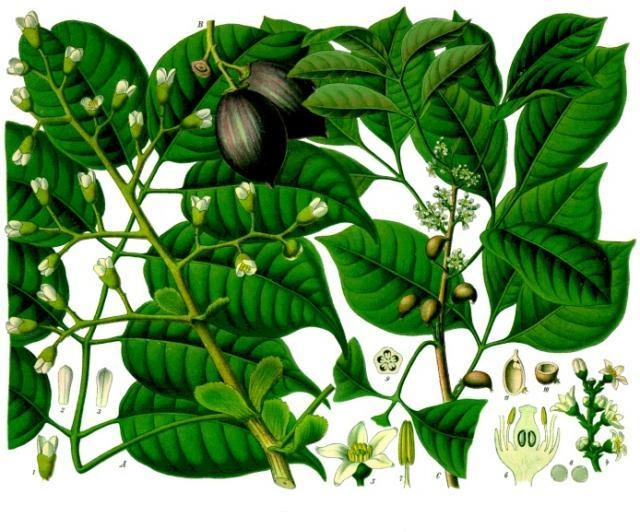
- Botanical illustration

Scientific classification
- Kingdom: Plantae
- Clade: Tracheophytes
- Clade: Angiosperms
- Clade: Eudicots
- Clade: Rosids
- Order: Sapindales
- Family: Burseraceae
- Genus: Protium
- Species: P. icicariba

Binomial name
- Protium icicariba (DC.) Marchand

Synonyms
- List: Amyris ambrosiacea L.f.; Bursera icicariba (DC.) Baill.; Elaphrium icicariba (DC.); Icica icicariba DC.; Icica sellowii Engl.; Tingulonga icicariba (DC.) Kuntze

= Protium icicariba =

Species of plant

Protium icicariba, the Brazilian elemi, is a species of flowering plant in the family Burseraceae. It is native to Venezuela and eastern Brazil. A tree, it is typically found in the wet tropics, and has edible, aromatic fruit.

== Subtaxa ==
The following varieties are accepted:

- Protium icicariba var. glabrescens Engl. – Venezuela
- Protium icicariba var. icicariba – Espírito Santo, Rio de Janeiro
- Protium icicariba var. talmonii Daly – Bahia
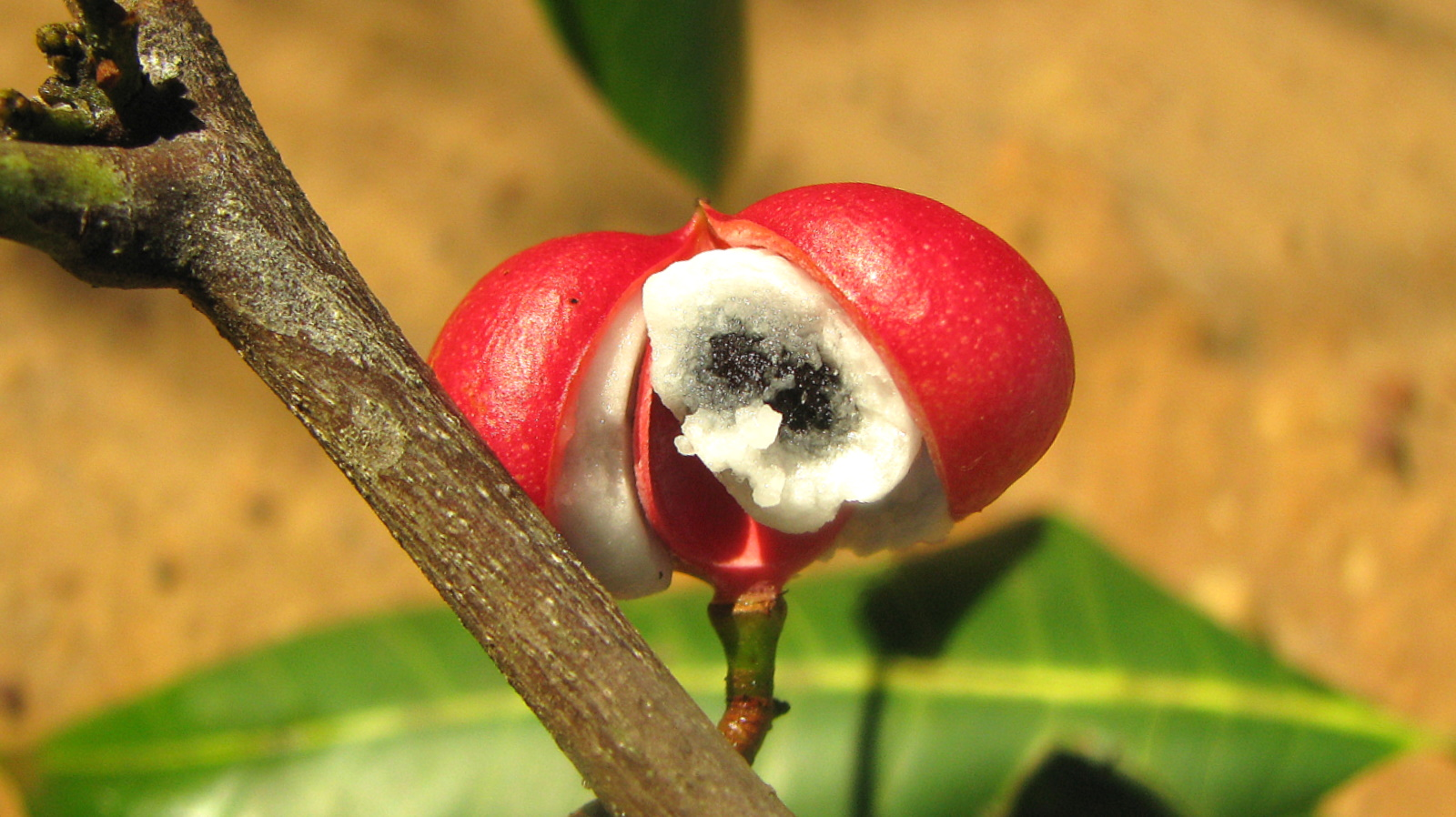
Fruit dehiscing
