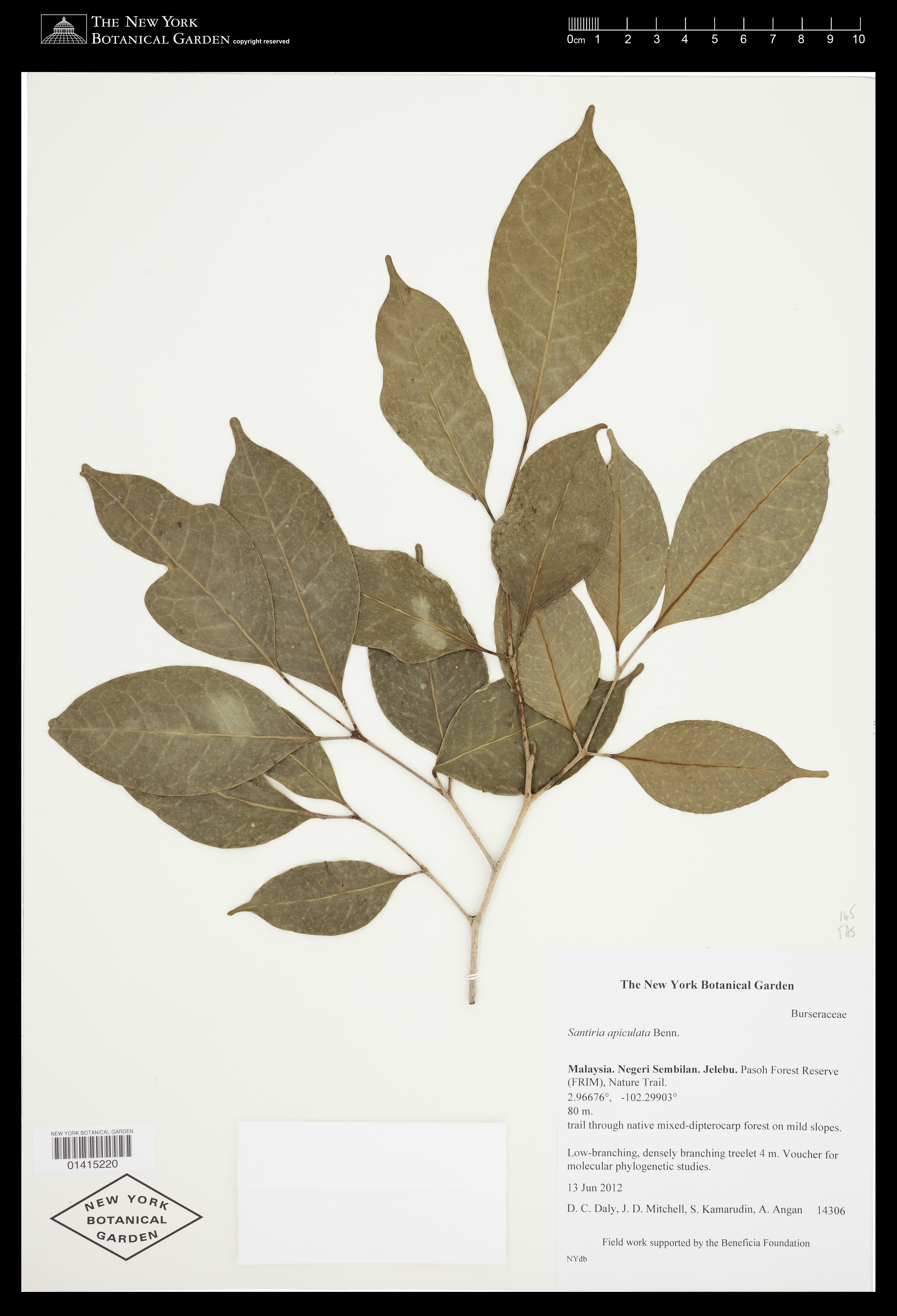

Conservation status
- Least Concern (IUCN 2.3)

Scientific classification
- Kingdom: Plantae
- Clade: Tracheophytes
- Clade: Angiosperms
- Clade: Eudicots
- Clade: Rosids
- Order: Sapindales
- Family: Burseraceae
- Genus: Santiria
- Species: S. apiculata

Binomial name
- Santiria apiculata A.W.Benn.

Synonyms
- Canarium parciflorum Ridl.

= Santiria apiculata =

Species of plant in family Burseraceae

Santiria apiculata is a species of flowering plant in the family Burseraceae. It is found in Indonesia, Malaysia, the Philippines, and Singapore.
