= S. nigricans =

S. nigricans may refer to:

- Santiria nigricans, a plant species
- Sayornis nigricans, the black phoebe, a bird species
- Scambus nigricans, an ichmeunon wasp species found in the United Kingdom
- Serpophaga nigricans, the sooty tyrannulet, a bird species
- Siphona nigricans, Villeneuve, 1930, a fly species in the genus Siphona
- Stegastes nigricans, a damselfish species
- Strophius nigricans, Keyserling, 1880, a spider species in the genus Strophius and the family Thomisidae found in Trinidad, Peru, Brazil and Paraguay

== Synonyms ==
- Salix nigricans, a synonym for Salix myrsinifolia, a willow species native to Europe and Western Siberia

== See also ==
- Nigricans (disambiguation)
