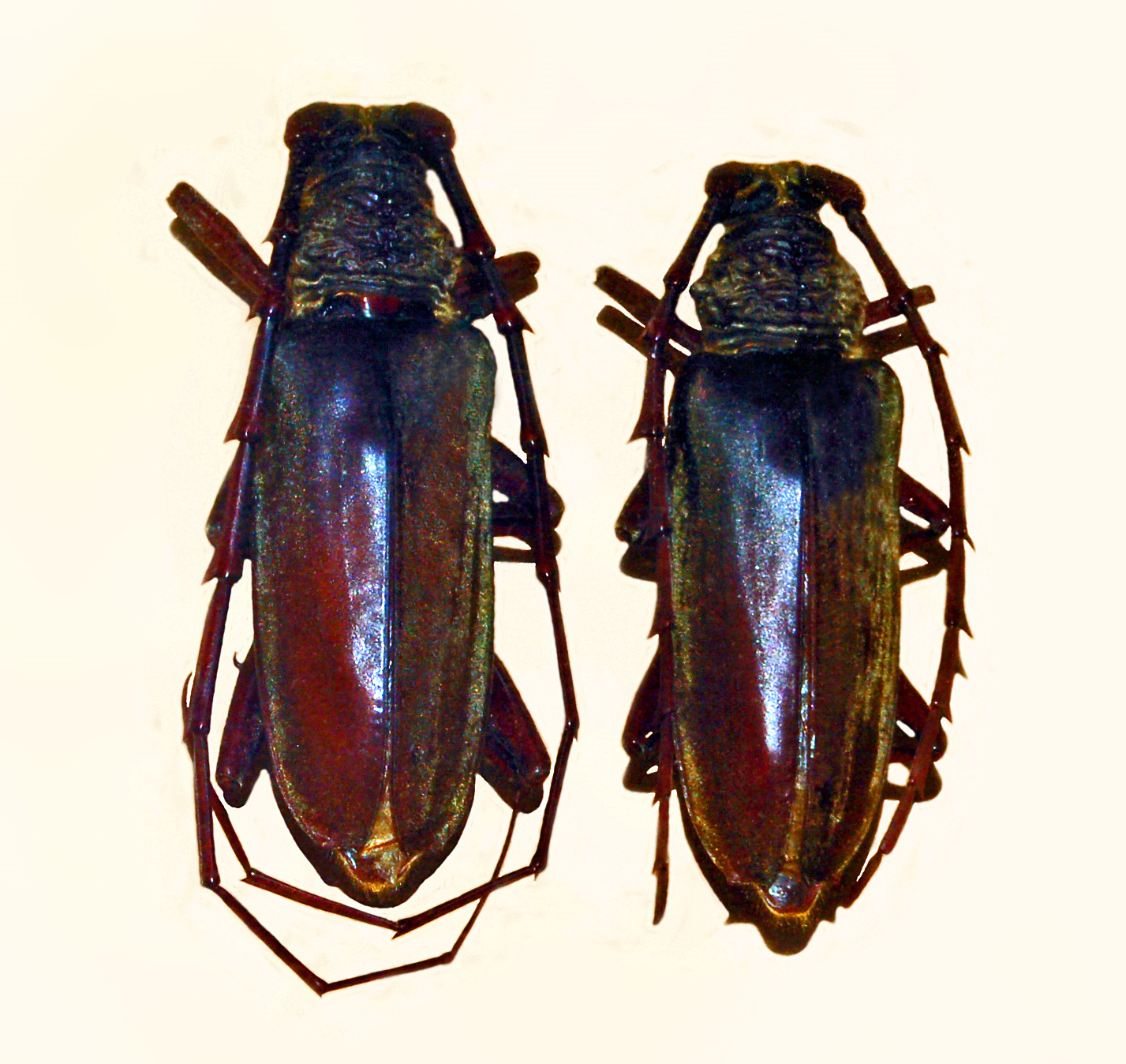
- Neoplocaederus fucatus from São Tomé and Principe. Male and female

Scientific classification
- Domain: Eukaryota
- Kingdom: Animalia
- Phylum: Arthropoda
- Class: Insecta
- Order: Coleoptera
- Suborder: Polyphaga
- Infraorder: Cucujiformia
- Family: Cerambycidae
- Subfamily: Cerambycinae
- Tribe: Cerambycini
- Subtribe: Cerambycina
- Genus: Neoplocaederus
- Species: N. fucatus

Binomial name
- Neoplocaederus fucatus (Thomson, 1858)

Synonyms
- Plocaederus fucatus Thomson, 1858; Hamaticherus fucatus; Hammaticherus fucatus

= Neoplocaederus fucatus =

Species of beetle

Neoplocaederus fucatus is a species of beetle belonging to the family Cerambycidae.

== Distribution ==
This species can be found in Cameroon, Gabon, Ghana, Nigeria, Uganda, Democratic Republic of Congo, Republic of the Congo, São Tomé and Principe and Togo.
