= Protium pittieri =

Conservation status
- Vulnerable (IUCN 3.1)

Scientific classification
- Kingdom: Plantae
- Clade: Tracheophytes
- Clade: Angiosperms
- Clade: Eudicots
- Clade: Rosids
- Order: Sapindales
- Family: Burseraceae
- Genus: Protium
- Species: P. pittieri

Binomial name
- Protium pittieri (Rose) Engl. (1931)

Synonyms
- Icica pittieri Rose (1911); Tetragastris tomentosa D.M.Porter (1970 publ. 1971)

Species of flowering plant

Protium pittieri (Spanish: alcanfor) is a species of plant in the Burseraceae family. It is native to Guerrero state in southwestern Mexico, to Nicaragua, Costa Rica and Panama in Central America, and to Ecuador in South America. It is threatened by habitat loss.
