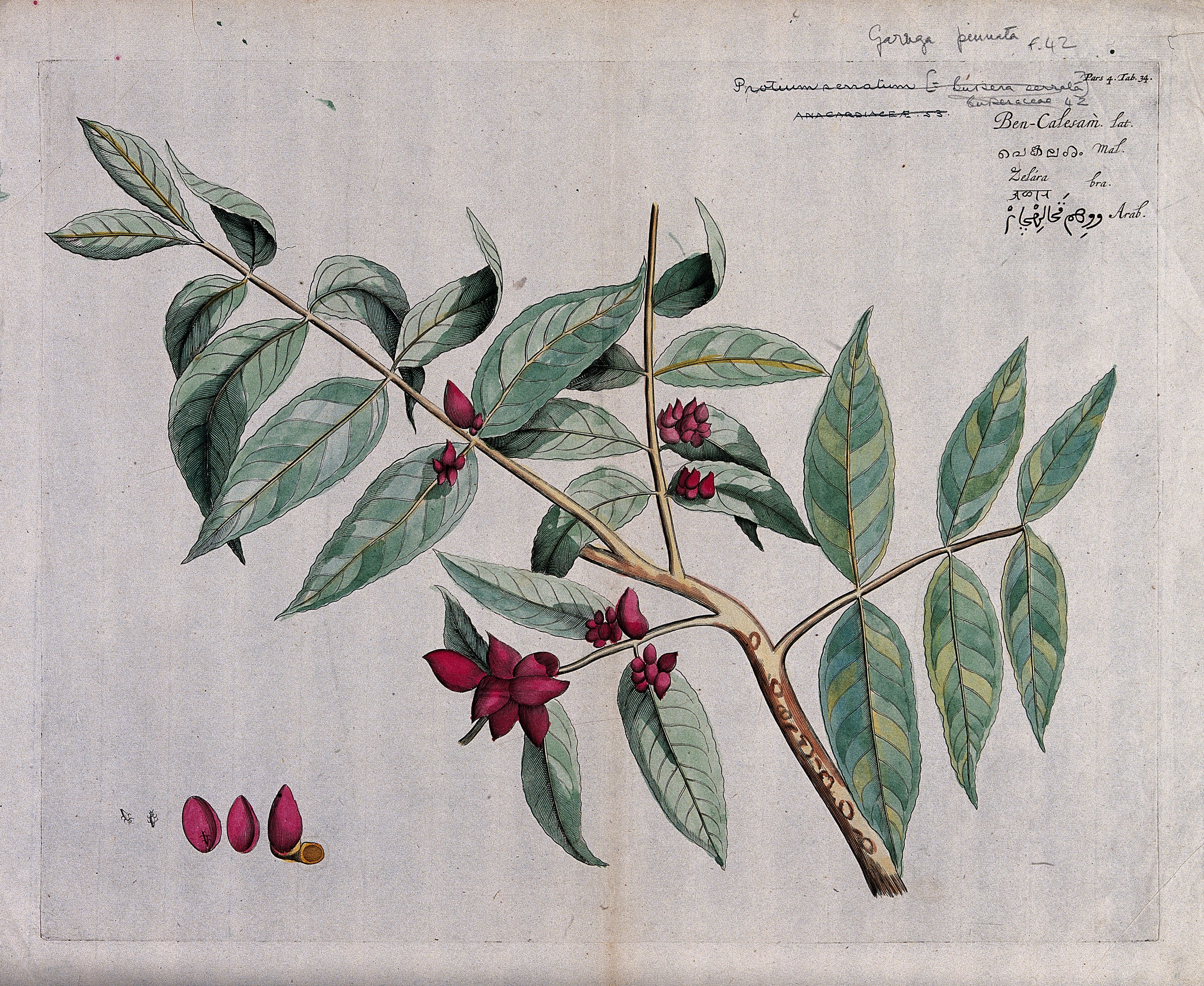
- Protium serratum: fruiting branch

Scientific classification
- Kingdom: Plantae
- Clade: Tracheophytes
- Clade: Angiosperms
- Clade: Eudicots
- Clade: Rosids
- Order: Sapindales
- Family: Burseraceae
- Genus: Protium
- Species: P. serratum

Binomial name
- Protium serratum (Wall. ex Colebr.) Engl.

Synonyms
- Tingulonga serrata Kuntze; Schinus saheria Buch.-Ham. Schinus niara Buch.-Ham. Schinus benghalensis Buch.-Ham. Icica serrata DC. Icica indica Wight & Arn. Icica bengalensis Voigt; Dracontomelon laoticum Evrard & Tardieu; Bursera serrata Wall. ex Colebr. Amyris ambrosiaca Moc. & Sesse

= Protium serratum =

Species of tree

Protium serratum is a small-medium tree species in the genus Protium and the family Burseraceae. It is commonly known as Indian red pear, Thaicherem, Dieng sohmir, Mir Tenga, Gulgutia, and Limbura in the Indian subcontinent region. The Catalogue of Life does not record any subspecies.

Its distribution is: Bhutan, China (Yunnan), Cambodia, India, Laos, Myanmar, Thailand and Vietnam.

== Names ==
In Tripura, it is known as Thaicherem in the local language Kokborok.
