= Santiria nigricans =

Conservation status
- Endangered (IUCN 3.1)

Scientific classification
- Kingdom: Plantae
- Clade: Tracheophytes
- Clade: Angiosperms
- Clade: Eudicots
- Clade: Rosids
- Order: Sapindales
- Family: Burseraceae
- Genus: Santiria
- Species: S. nigricans

Binomial name
- Santiria nigricans Kochummen

Species of tree

Santiria nigricans is a species of plant in the family Burseraceae. It is a tree endemic to Borneo where it is confined to Sarawak.
