= Triomma =

Scientific classification
- Kingdom: Plantae
- Clade: Tracheophytes
- Clade: Angiosperms
- Clade: Eudicots
- Clade: Rosids
- Order: Sapindales
- Family: Burseraceae
- Genus: Triomma; Hook.f.

Genus of flowering plants

Triomma is a genus of flowering plants belonging to the family Burseraceae.

Its native range is Western Malesia.

Species:

- Triomma malaccensis Hook.f.
