= Scutinanthe =

Scientific classification
- Kingdom: Plantae
- Clade: Tracheophytes
- Clade: Angiosperms
- Clade: Eudicots
- Clade: Rosids
- Order: Sapindales
- Family: Burseraceae
- Genus: Scutinanthe; Thwaites

Genus of flowering plants

Scutinanthe is a genus of plants in the family Burseraceae.

Species:

- Scutinanthe brevisepala Leenh.
- Scutinanthe brunnea Thwaites
