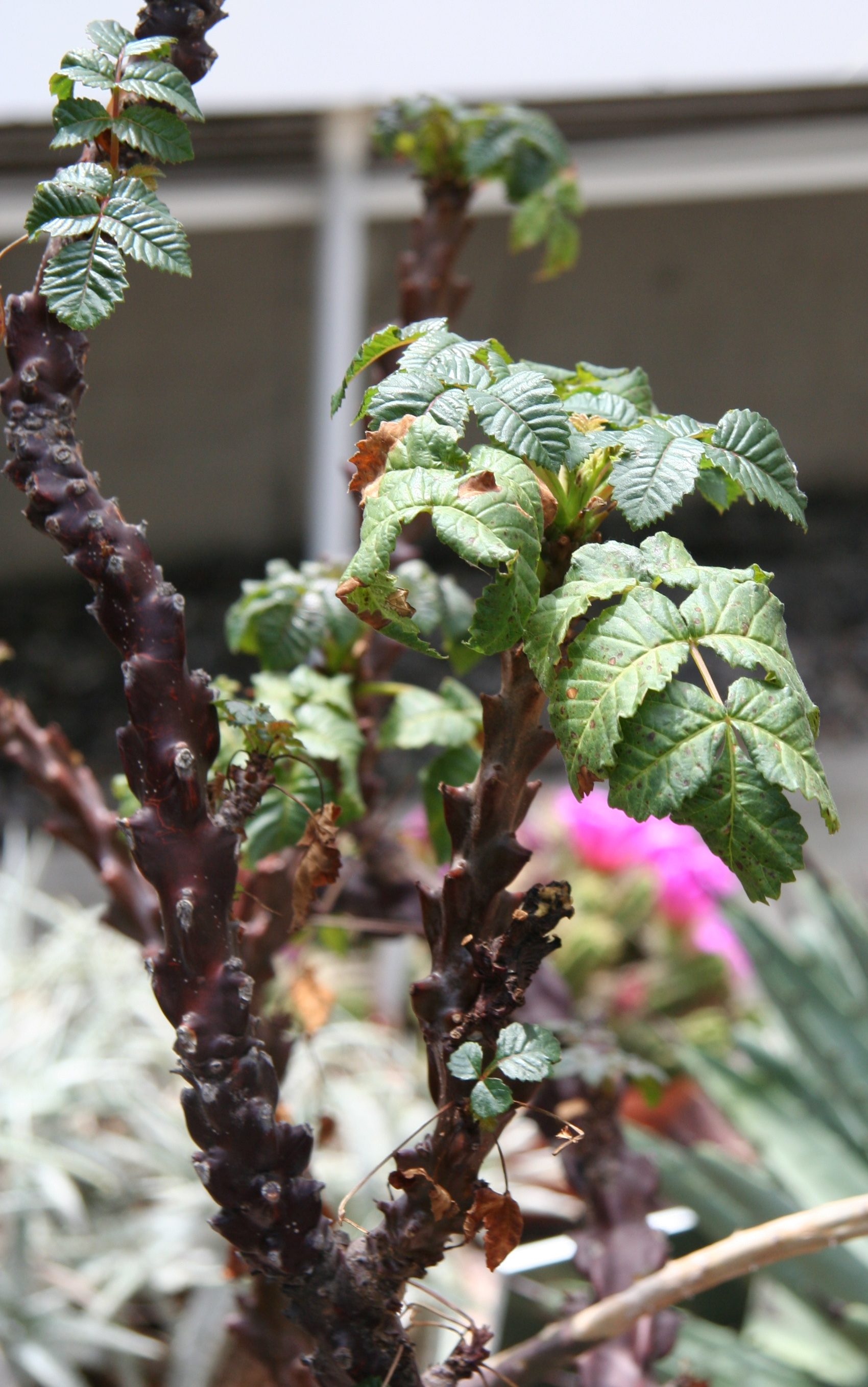

Scientific classification
- Kingdom: Plantae
- Clade: Tracheophytes
- Clade: Angiosperms
- Clade: Eudicots
- Clade: Rosids
- Order: Sapindales
- Family: Burseraceae
- Genus: Beiselia; Forman
- Species: B. mexicana

Binomial name
- Beiselia mexicana Forman

= Beiselia =

Genus of flowering plants

Beiselia is a genus of flowering plants belonging to the family Burseraceae. The only species is Beiselia mexicana.

Its native range is Southwestern Mexico.
