= Canarium littorale =

Conservation status
- Least Concern (IUCN 2.3)

Scientific classification
- Kingdom: Plantae
- Clade: Tracheophytes
- Clade: Angiosperms
- Clade: Eudicots
- Clade: Rosids
- Order: Sapindales
- Family: Burseraceae
- Genus: Canarium
- Species: C. littorale

Binomial name
- Canarium littorale Blume

Synonyms
- List: Canarium acutum Engl.; Canarium bennettii Engl.; Canarium flavum Ridl.; Canarium giganteum Engl.; Canarium glaucum Blume; Canarium pruinosum Engl.; Canarium pseudocommune Hochr.; Canarium purpurascens A.W.Benn.; Canarium rufum A.W.Benn.; Canarium secundum A.W.Benn.; Canarium serricuspe Miq.; Canarium serrulatum Miq.; Canarium tomentosum Blume

Species of tree

Canarium littorale is a tree found in tropical Asia and is a member of the incense tree family Burseraceae. The specific epithet littorale is from the Latin meaning "of the seashore", referring to its habitat.

== Description ==
Canarium littorale grows as a tree up to 40 metres (130 ft) tall with a trunk diameter of up to 60 cm (24 in). Its grey bark is smooth to scaly. The fruits are ellipsoid to ovoid and measure up to 7 cm (3 in) long.

== Distribution and habitat ==
Canarium littorale grows naturally in Indo-China, Sumatra, Peninsular Malaysia, Java and Borneo. Its habitat is forests from sea-level to 1,100 metres (3,600 ft) altitude.
