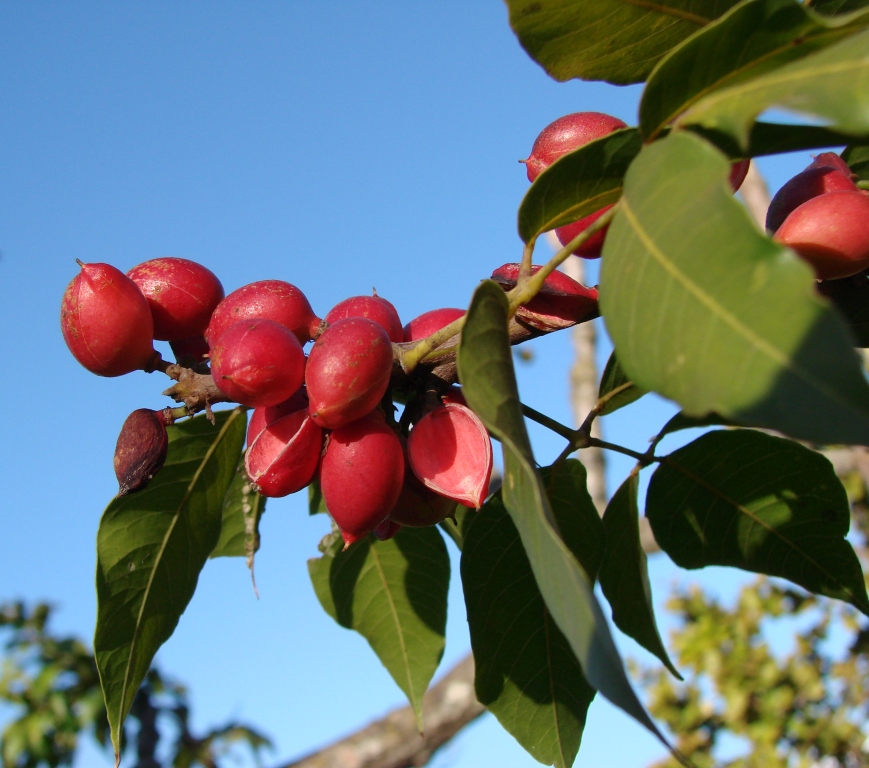
- Protium heptaphyllum

Scientific classification
- Kingdom: Plantae
- Clade: Embryophytes
- Clade: Tracheophytes
- Clade: Angiosperms
- Clade: Eudicots
- Clade: Rosids
- Order: Sapindales
- Family: Burseraceae
- Genus: Protium; Burm.f. (1768), nom. cons.

Species
- 151, see text

Synonyms
- Caproxylon Tussac (1827); Crepidospermum Hook.f. (1862); Dammara Gaertn. (1791); Hedwigia Sw. (1788), nom. rej.; Hemicrepidospermum Swart (1942); Icica Aubl. (1775); Icicopsis Engl. (1874); Knorrea DC. (1825), not validly publ.; Managa Aubl. (1775); Marignia Comm. ex Kunth (1824); Paraprotium Cuatrec. (1952); Schwaegrichenia Rchb. (1828); Tetragastris Gaertn. (1790); Tingulonga Rumph. ex Kuntze (1891)

= Protium (plant) =

Genus of flowering plants

Protium is a genus of more than 140 species of flowering plants in the family Burseraceae. It is native to the Neotropics from northern Mexico to Paraguay and southern Brazil, and to Madagascar, the Indian subcontinent, Indochina, southern China, the Philippines, Java, and New Guinea. The genus had been included in Bursera, but is distinct.

The species are usually small or medium-sized trees, but some can be large, up to 35 m (115 ft) tall. In their native range, some species are grown for timber, used as firewood, as medicinal plants, for their fruit, their resin (Copal) or in other cultural contexts.

== Species ==
151 species are accepted.

- Protium acrense Daly
- Protium aguilarii D.Santam.
- Protium aidanianum Daly
- Protium altissimum (Aubl.) Marchand
- Protium altsonii Sandwith
- Protium alvarezianum Daly & P.Fine
- Protium amazonicum (Cuatrec.) Daly
- Protium amplum Cuatrec.
- Protium almecega March.
- Protium apiculatum Sw.
- Protium aracouchini (Aubl.) Marchand
- Protium araguense Cuatrec.
- Protium atlanticum (Daly) Byng & Christenh.
- Protium attenuatum (Rose) Urb.
- Protium bahianum Daly
- Protium balsamiferum (Sw.) Daly & P.Fine
- Protium bangii Swart
- Protium baracoense Bisse
- Protium beandou Marchand ex Engl.
- Protium boomii Daly
- Protium brasiliense Engl.
- Protium brenesii (Standl.) D.Santam.
- Protium breviacuminatum (Swart) Byng & Christenh.
- Protium buenaventurense Cuatrec.
- Protium calanense Cuatrec.
- Protium calendulinum Daly
- Protium carana (Humb.) Marchand
- Protium carnosum A.C.Sm.
- Protium carolense Daly
- Protium catuaba (Soares da Cunha) Daly & P.Fine
- Protium cerradicola Daly
- Protium chagrense (Pittier) Daly & P.Fine
- Protium colombianum Cuatrec.
- Protium confusum (Rose) Pittier (synonym Protium correae)
- Protium connarifolium (G.Perkins) Merr.
- Protium copal (Schltdl. & Cham.) Engl.
- Protium cordatum Huber
- Protium coriaceum Engl.
- Protium cornutum Daly
- Protium costaricense (Rose) Engl.
- Protium cranipyrenum Cuatrec.
- Protium crassipetalum Cuatrec.
- Protium crenatum Sandwith
- Protium cubense (Rose) Urb.
- Protium cundinamarcense Cuatrec.
- Protium cuneatum Swart
- Protium cuneifolium (Cuatrec.) Byng & Christenh.
- Protium dawsonii Cuatrec.
- Protium decandrum (Aubl.) Marchand
- Protium decorum Daly
- Protium demerarense Swart
- Protium divaricatum Engl.
- Protium ecuadorense Benoist
- Protium elegans Engl.
- Protium ferrugineum (Engl.) Engl.
- Protium fragrans (Rose) Urb.
- Protium gallicum Daly
- Protium gallosum Daly
- Protium giganteum Engl.
- Protium glabrescens Swart
- Protium glabrum (Rose) Engl.
- Protium glaucescens Urb.
- Protium glaucum J.F.Macbr.
- Protium glaziovii Swart
- Protium glomerulosum Cuatrec.
- Protium goudotianum (Tul.) Byng & Christenh.
- Protium grandifolium Engl.
- Protium guacayanum Cuatrec.
- Protium guianense (Aubl.) Marchand
- Protium hammelii D.Santam.
- Protium hebetatum Daly
- Protium heptaphyllum (Aubl.) Marchand
- Protium herbertii Daly & P.Fine
- Protium icicariba (DC.) Marchand (= Icica icicariba)
- Protium inodorum Daly
- Protium insigne (Triana & Planch.) Engl.
- Protium javanicum Burm.f.
- Protium kleinii Cuatrec.
- Protium klugii J.F.Macbr.
- Protium krukoffii Swart
- Protium laxiflorum Engl.
- Protium leptostachyum Cuatrec.
- Protium llanorum Cuatrec.
- Protium macgregorii (F.M.Bailey) Leenh.
- Protium macrocarpum Cuatrec.
- Protium macrophyllum (Kunth) Engl.
- Protium macrosepalum Swart
- Protium madagascariense Engl.
- Protium maestrense Bisse
- Protium mcleodii I.M.Johnst.
- Protium melinonis Engl.
- Protium meridionale Swart
- Protium minutiflorum Cuatrec.
- Protium montanum Swart
- Protium morii Daly
- Protium mucronatum Rusby
- Protium multijugum (Swart) Byng & Christenh.
- Protium multiramiflorum Lundell
- Protium nervosum Cuatrec.
- Protium nitidifolium (Cuatrec.) Daly
- Protium nodulosum Swart
- Protium obtusifolium (Lam.) Marchand (= Dammara graveolens)
- Protium occhionii Rizzini
- Protium occultum Daly
- Protium opacum Swart
- Protium ovatum Engl.
- Protium oxapampae Daly & Reynel
- Protium pallidum Cuatrec.
- Protium panamense (Rose) I.M.Johnst.
- Protium paniculatum Engl.
- Protium pecuniosum Daly
- Protium peruvianum Swart
- Protium pilosellum Swart
- Protium pilosissimum Engl.
- Protium pilosum (Cuatrec.) Daly
- Protium pittieri (Rose) Engl.
- Protium plagiocarpium Benoist
- Protium polybotryum Engl.
- Protium prancei (Daly) Byng & Christenh.
- Protium pristifolium Daly
- Protium ptarianum Steyerm.
- Protium pullei Swart
- Protium puncticulatum J.F.Macbr.
- Protium ravenii D.M.Porter
- Protium reticulatum (Engl.) Endl.
- Protium retusum Daly
- Protium rhoifolium (Benth.) Byng & Christenh.
- Protium rhynchophyllum (Rusby) Daly
- Protium robustum (Swart) D.M.Porter
- Protium rubrum Cuatrec.
- Protium sagotianum Marchand
- Protium santamariae Perdiz, Daly & P.Fine
- Protium serratum (Wall. ex Colebr.) Engl.
- Protium spruceanum (Benth.) Engl.
- Protium stevensonii (Standl.) Daly
- Protium strumosum Daly
- Protium subacuminatum Swart
- Protium subserratum (Engl.) Engl.
- Protium surinamense Byng & Christenh.
- Protium tenuifolium (Engl.) Engl.
- Protium tonkinense (Guillaumin) Engl.
- Protium tonyanum Daly
- Protium tovarense Pittier
- Protium trifoliolatum Engl.
- Protium unifoliolatum Engl.
- Protium urophyllidium Daly
- Protium varians (Little) Byng & Christenh.
- Protium veneralense Cuatrec.
- Protium vestitum (Cuatrec.) Daly
- Protium warmingianum Marchand
- Protium widgrenii Engl.
- Protium yanachagae Daly
- Protium yunnanense (Hu) Kalkman

== Uses ==
- Caranna, medicinal gum
