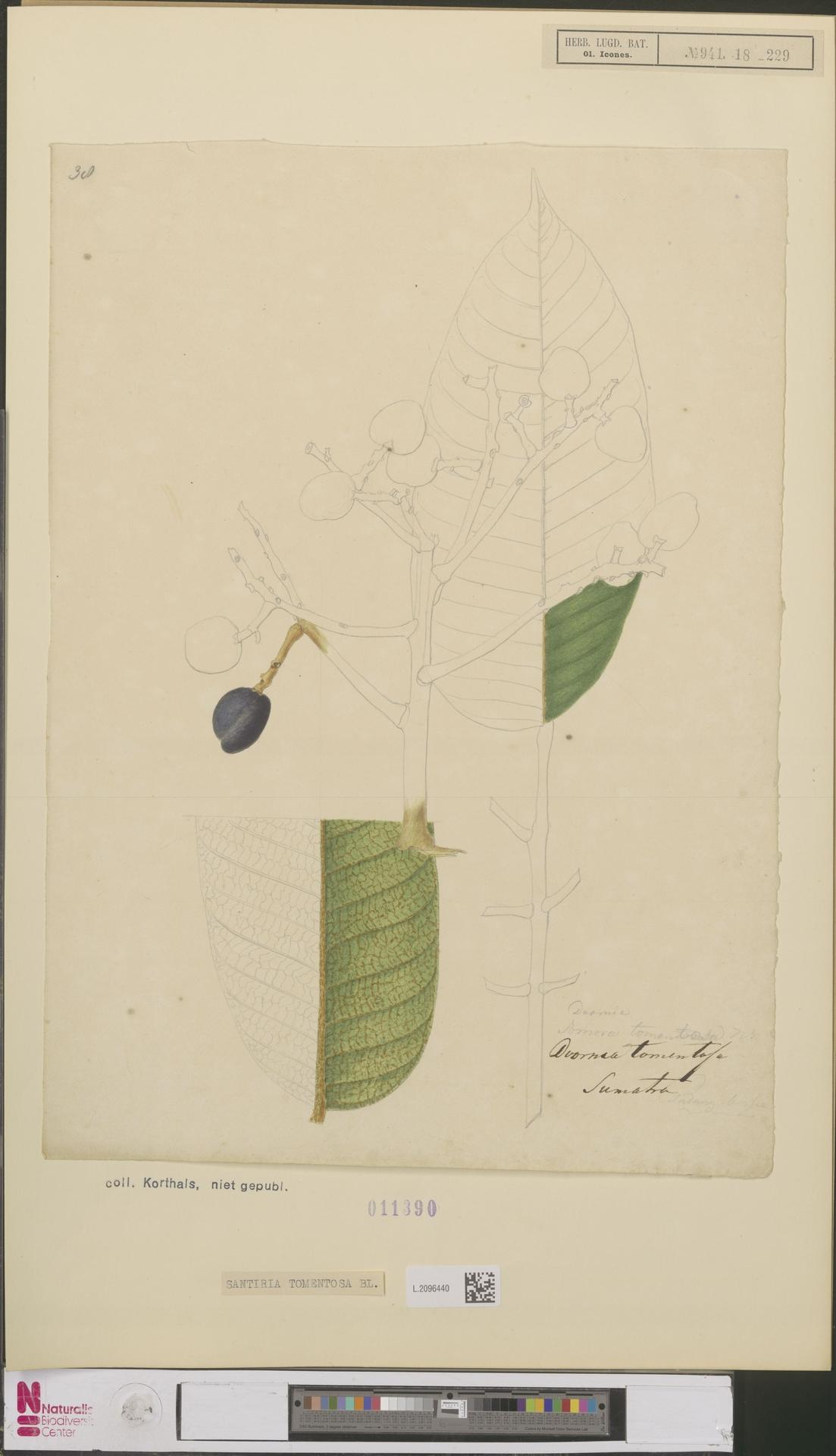

Conservation status
- Least Concern (IUCN 2.3)

Scientific classification
- Kingdom: Plantae
- Clade: Tracheophytes
- Clade: Angiosperms
- Clade: Eudicots
- Clade: Rosids
- Order: Sapindales
- Family: Burseraceae
- Genus: Santiria
- Species: S. tomentosa

Binomial name
- Santiria tomentosa Blume

= Santiria tomentosa =

Species of flowering plant

Santiria tomentosa is a species of plant in the family Burseraceae. It is found in Indonesia, Malaysia, the Philippines, and Singapore.
