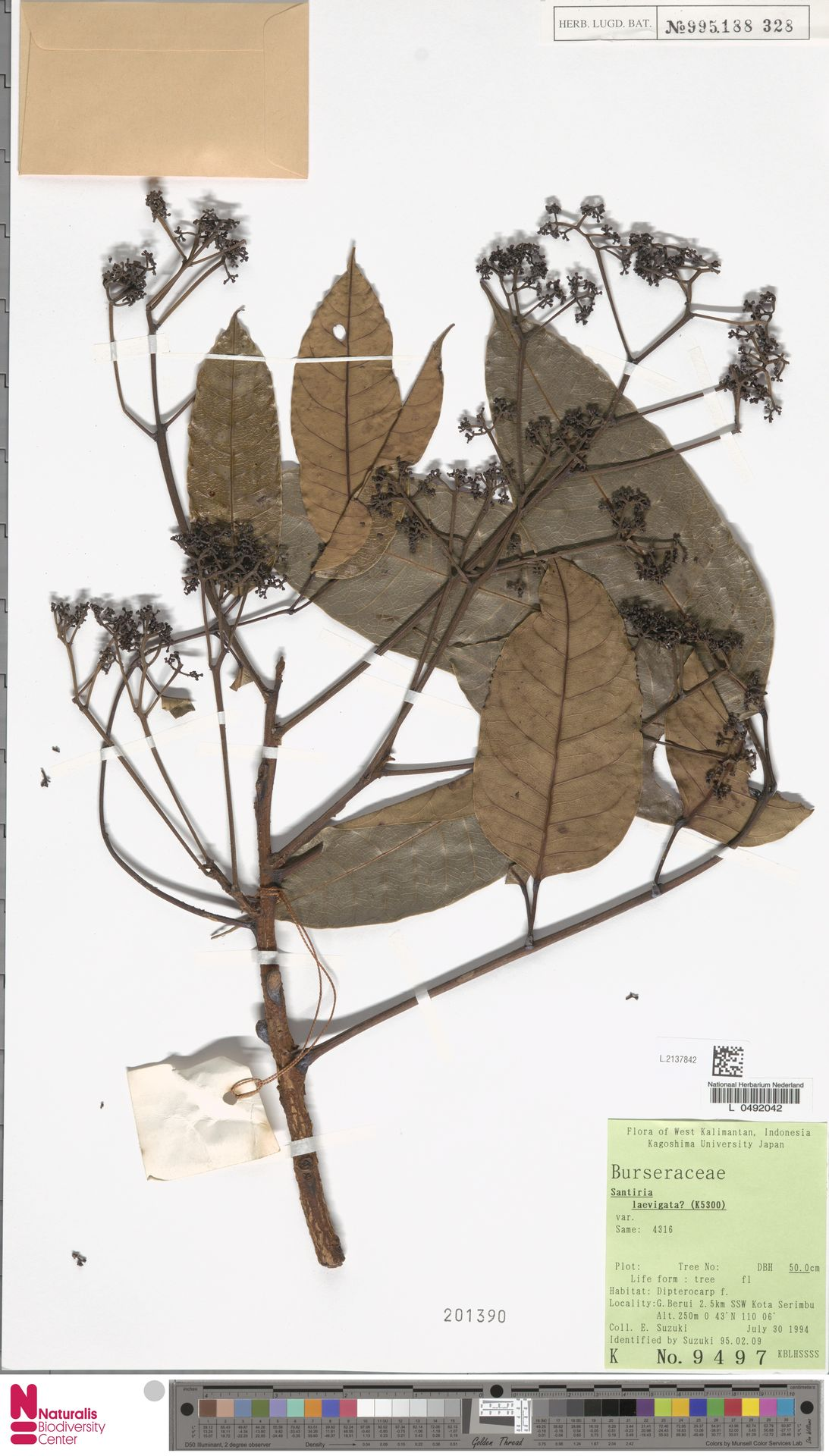

Conservation status
- Least Concern (IUCN 2.3)

Scientific classification
- Kingdom: Plantae
- Clade: Tracheophytes
- Clade: Angiosperms
- Clade: Eudicots
- Clade: Rosids
- Order: Sapindales
- Family: Burseraceae
- Genus: Santiria
- Species: S. laevigata

Binomial name
- Santiria laevigata Blume

= Santiria laevigata =

Species of flowering plant

Santiria laevigata is a species of plant in the Burseraceae family. It is found in Indonesia, Malaysia, the Philippines, and Singapore.
