= Pseudodacryodes =

Scientific classification
- Kingdom: Plantae
- Clade: Tracheophytes
- Clade: Angiosperms
- Clade: Eudicots
- Clade: Rosids
- Order: Sapindales
- Family: Burseraceae
- Genus: Pseudodacryodes; Pierlot
- Species: P. leonardiana

Binomial name
- Pseudodacryodes leonardiana Pierlot

Genus of plants

Pseudodacryodes is a monotypic genus of flowering plants belonging to the family Burseraceae. The only species is Pseudodacryodes leonardiana.

Its native range is Western Central Tropical Africa.
