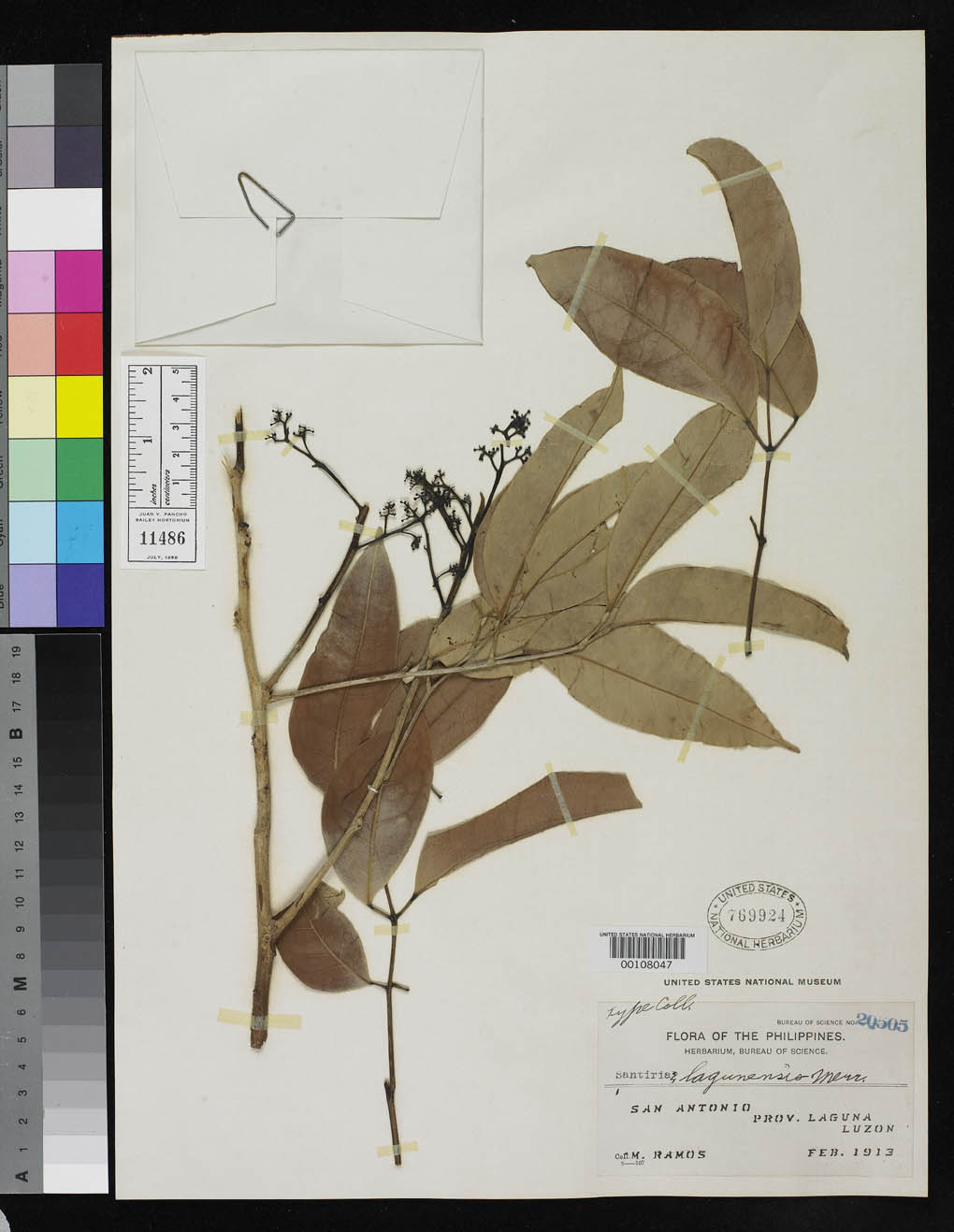
- Santiria apiculata

Scientific classification
- Kingdom: Plantae
- Clade: Tracheophytes
- Clade: Angiosperms
- Clade: Eudicots
- Clade: Rosids
- Order: Sapindales
- Family: Burseraceae
- Genus: Santiria; Blume

Synonyms
- Icicaster Ridl.; Santiriopsis Engl.; Trigonochlamys Hook.f.

= Santiria =

Genus of flowering plants

Santiria is a genus of plants in the family Burseraceae.

Species include:

- Santiria apiculata Benn.
- Santiria dacryodifolia Kochummen
- Santiria griffithii (Hook. f.) Engl.
- Santiria impressinervis Kochummen
- Santiria kalkmaniana Kochummen
- Santiria laevigata Blume
- Santiria nigricans Kochummen
- Santiria sarawakana Kochummen
- Santiria tomentosa Blume
