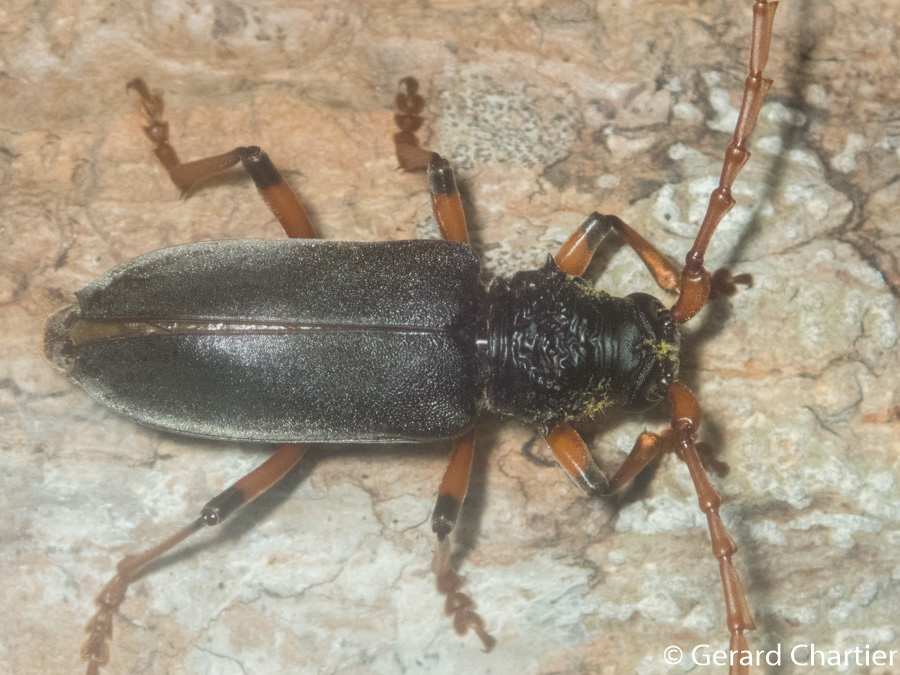
- Neoplocaederus ruficornis, Cambodia

Scientific classification
- Domain: Eukaryota
- Kingdom: Animalia
- Phylum: Arthropoda
- Class: Insecta
- Order: Coleoptera
- Suborder: Polyphaga
- Infraorder: Cucujiformia
- Family: Cerambycidae
- Subfamily: Cerambycinae
- Tribe: Cerambycini
- Subtribe: Cerambycina
- Genus: Neoplocaederus; Sama, 1991

Synonyms
- Aegimalus Gistl, 1848; Plocaederus Thomson, 1860; Plocederus Gemminger & Harold, 1873

= Neoplocaederus =

Genus of beetles

Neoplocaederus is a genus of longhorn beetles in the family Cerambycidae. There are more than 50 described species in Neoplocaederus, found in southern Asia and Africa.

== Species ==
These 55 species belong to the genus Neoplocaederus:

- Neoplocaederus basalis (Gahan, 1890) (Africa)
- Neoplocaederus basilewskyi (Fuchs, 1971) (DR Congo)
- Neoplocaederus bennigseni (Kolbe, 1898) (Tanzania)
- Neoplocaederus bicolor (Gressitt, 1942) (Tibet, China, Taiwan)
- Neoplocaederus bicoloripes (Atkinson, 1953) (DR Congo)
- Neoplocaederus bruncki (Villiers, 1969) (Madagascar)
- Neoplocaederus caroli (Leprieur, 1876) (Algeria, Morocco, Libya)
- Neoplocaederus chloropterus (Chevrolat, 1856) (West Africa)
- Neoplocaederus cineraceus (Fairmaire, 1882) (Somalia)
- Neoplocaederus conradti (Kolbe, 1893) (Djibouti, Tanzania, Ethiopia)
- Neoplocaederus consocius (Pascoe, 1859) (Sri Lanka)
- Neoplocaederus cyanipennis (Thomson, 1861) (Gambia, Ivory Coast, Sénégal)
- Neoplocaederus danilevskyi Lazarev, 2009 (Kazakhstan)
- Neoplocaederus denticornis (Fabricius, 1801) (Africa)
- Neoplocaederus elongatulus (Holzschuh, 1993) (Saudi Arabia)
- Neoplocaederus emini (Waterhouse, 1890) (Kenya, Somalia, Ethiopia)
- Neoplocaederus ferrugineus (Linné, 1758) (Sri Lanka and India)
- Neoplocaederus formosus (Harold, 1878) (Angola)
- Neoplocaederus francqueni (Lepesme & Breuning, 1956) (Republic of the Congo, DR Congo)
- Neoplocaederus frenatus (Fåhraeus, 1872) (Africa)
- Neoplocaederus fucatus (Thomson, 1858) (Africa)
- Neoplocaederus gabonicus (Gahan, 1890) (Gabon)
- Neoplocaederus glabricollis (Hope, 1843) (Cameroon, Ivory Coast, Guinea)
- Neoplocaederus grandicornis (Atkinson, 1953) (DR Congo)
- Neoplocaederus granulatus (Aurivillius, 1908) (Namibia and South Africa)
- Neoplocaederus incertus (Gestro, 1892) (Somalia)
- Neoplocaederus iranicus Rapuzzi & Sama, 2014 (Iran)
- Neoplocaederus iridescens (Atkinson, 1953) (DR Congo, Gabon, Ghana)
- Neoplocaederus kolbei (Hintz, 1910) (Kenya)
- Neoplocaederus laszlokotani Kotán & Sama, 2011
- Neoplocaederus leichneri (Müller, 1941) (Ethiopia)
- Neoplocaederus luristanicus (Holzschuh, 1977) (Iran)
- Neoplocaederus lymphaticus (Lameere, 1890) (Bangladesh, India)
- Neoplocaederus martini Juhel & Le Gall, 2023
- Neoplocaederus melancholicus (Gahan, 1890) (Africa)
- Neoplocaederus multipunctatus (Atkinson, 1953) (Ivory Coast and DR Congo)
- Neoplocaederus nitidicollis (Atkinson, 1953) (Uganda and DR Congo)
- Neoplocaederus nitidipennis (Chevrolat, 1858) (Gabon, Sierra Leone, Nigeria)
- Neoplocaederus obesus (Gahan, 1890) (South, Southeast, and East Asia)
- Neoplocaederus opalinus (Atkinson, 1953) (DR Congo)
- Neoplocaederus parallelus (Atkinson, 1953) (Africa)
- Neoplocaederus parvulus (Müller, 1942) (Somalie)
- Neoplocaederus pedestris (White, 1853) (Myanmar, China, India)
- Neoplocaederus peelei (Gahan, 1898) (Kenya)
- Neoplocaederus pronus (Fåhraeus, 1872) (South Africa)
- Neoplocaederus punctipennis (Müller, 1942) (Somalie)
- Neoplocaederus purpuripennis (Gahan, 1890) (South Africa)
- Neoplocaederus ruficornis (Newman, 1842) (Southeast Asia)
- Neoplocaederus scapularis (Fischer-Waldheim, 1821) (Asia)
- Neoplocaederus spinicornis (Fabricius, 1781) (Africa)
- Neoplocaederus vadoni (Villiers, 1969) (Madagascar)
- Neoplocaederus vayssierei (Lepesme & Breuning, 1956) (Guinea)
- Neoplocaederus vicinus (Villiers, 1969) (Madagascar)
- Neoplocaederus viridescens (Atkinson, 1953) (Africa)
- Neoplocaederus viridipennis (Hope, 1843) (Africa)
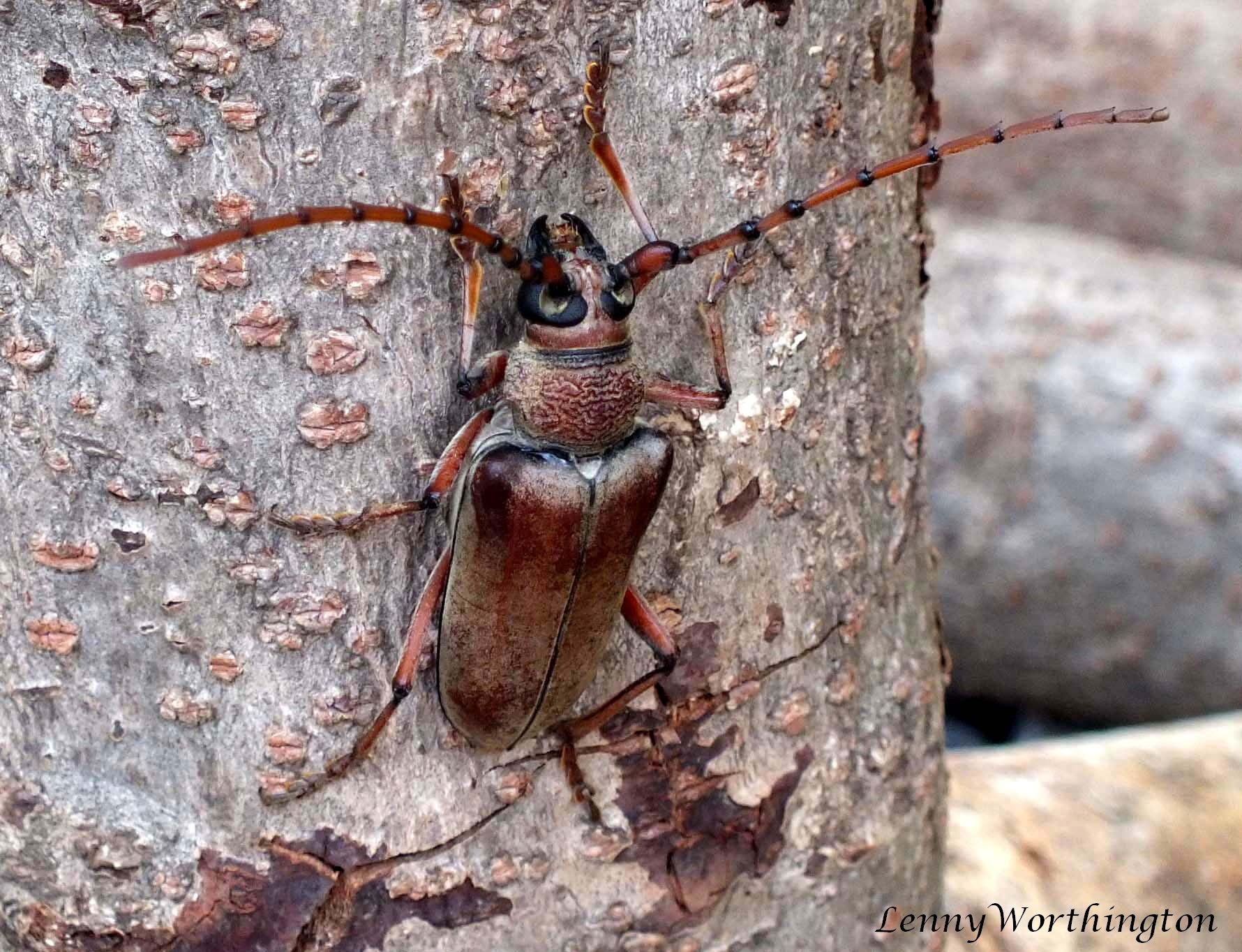
Neoplocaederus obesus, Thailand

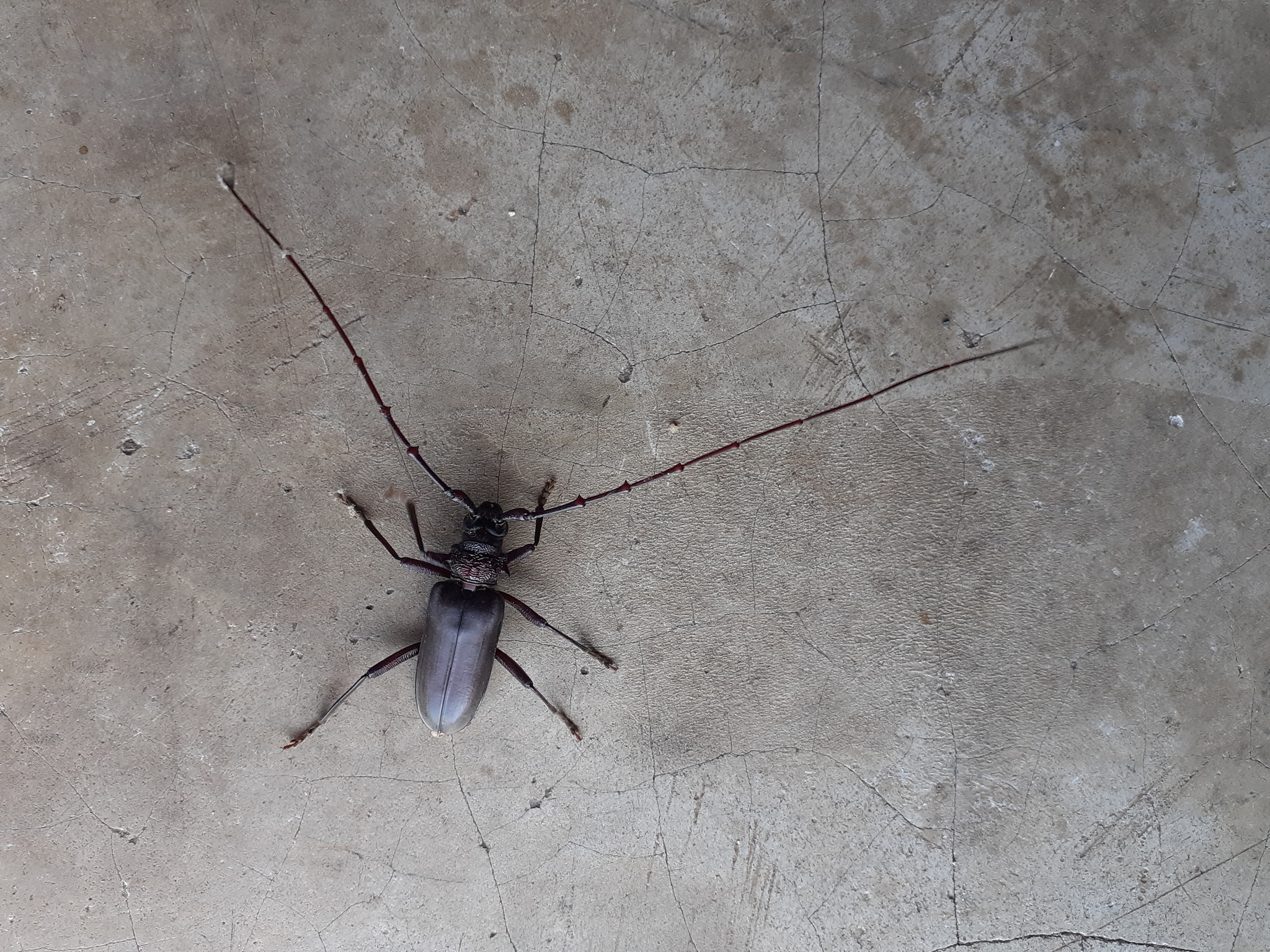
Neoplocaederus frenatus, South Africa

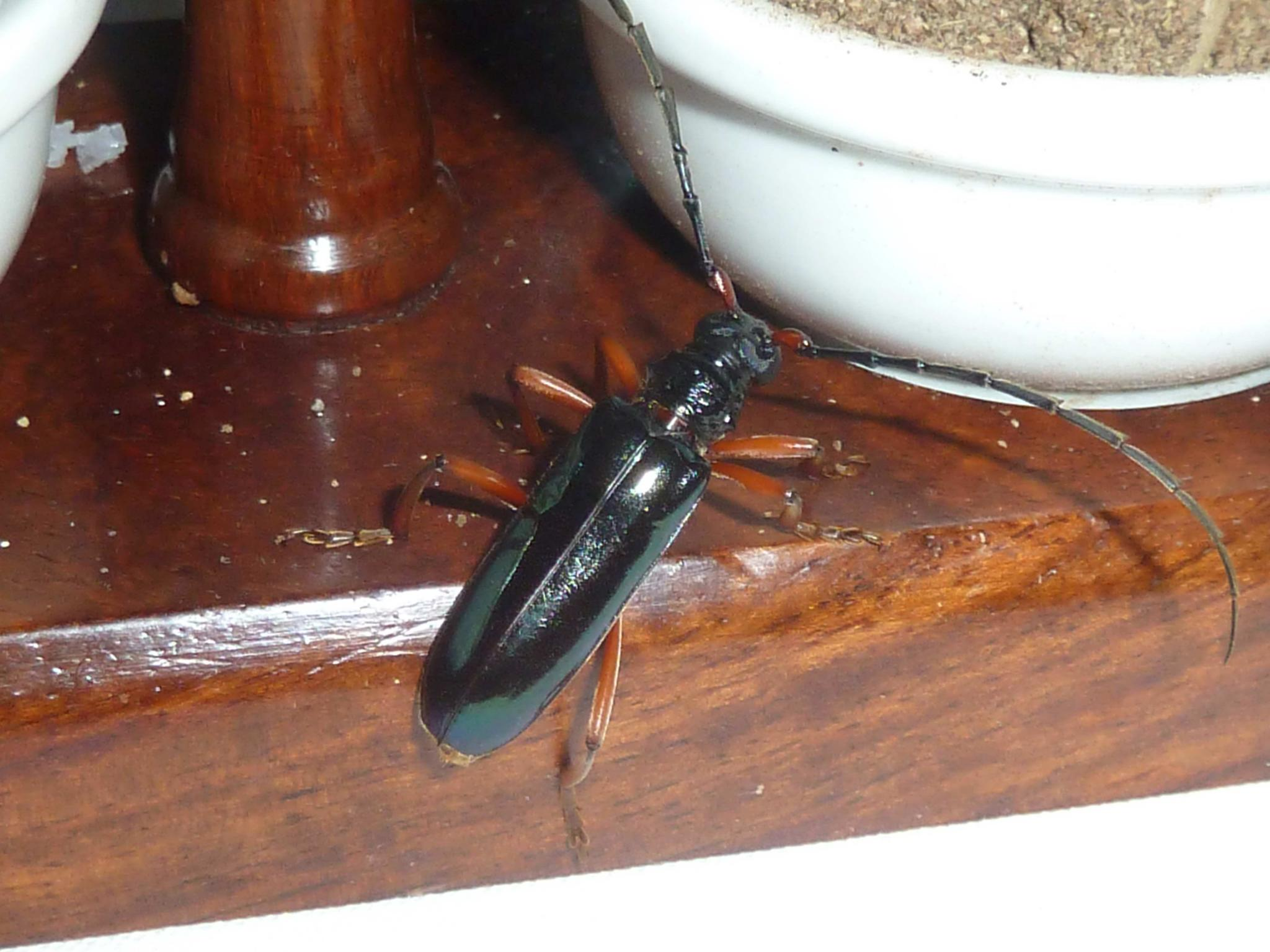
Neoplocaederus parallelus, South Africa

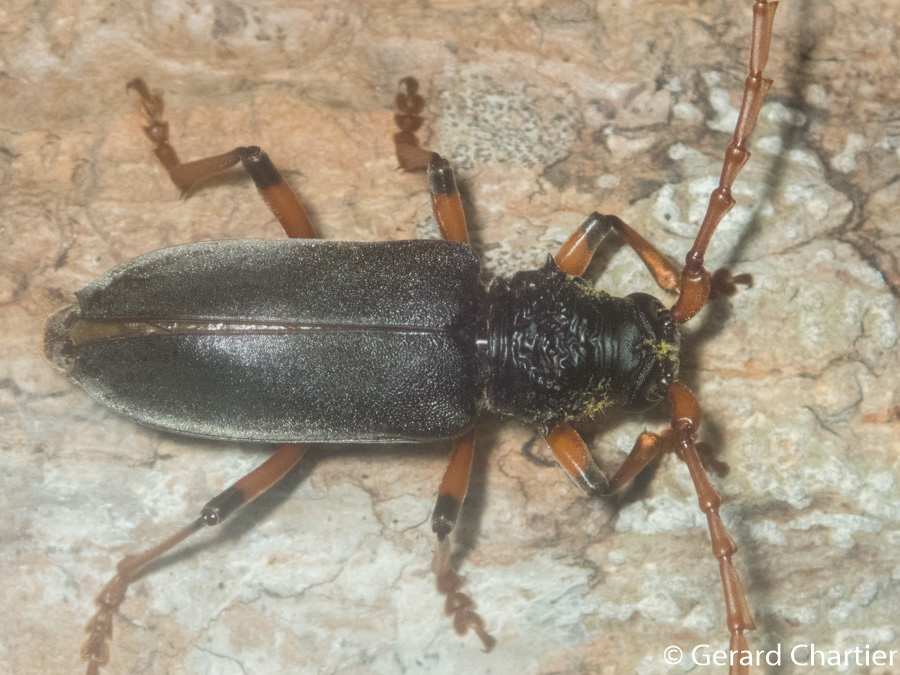
Neoplocaederus ruficornis, Cambodia

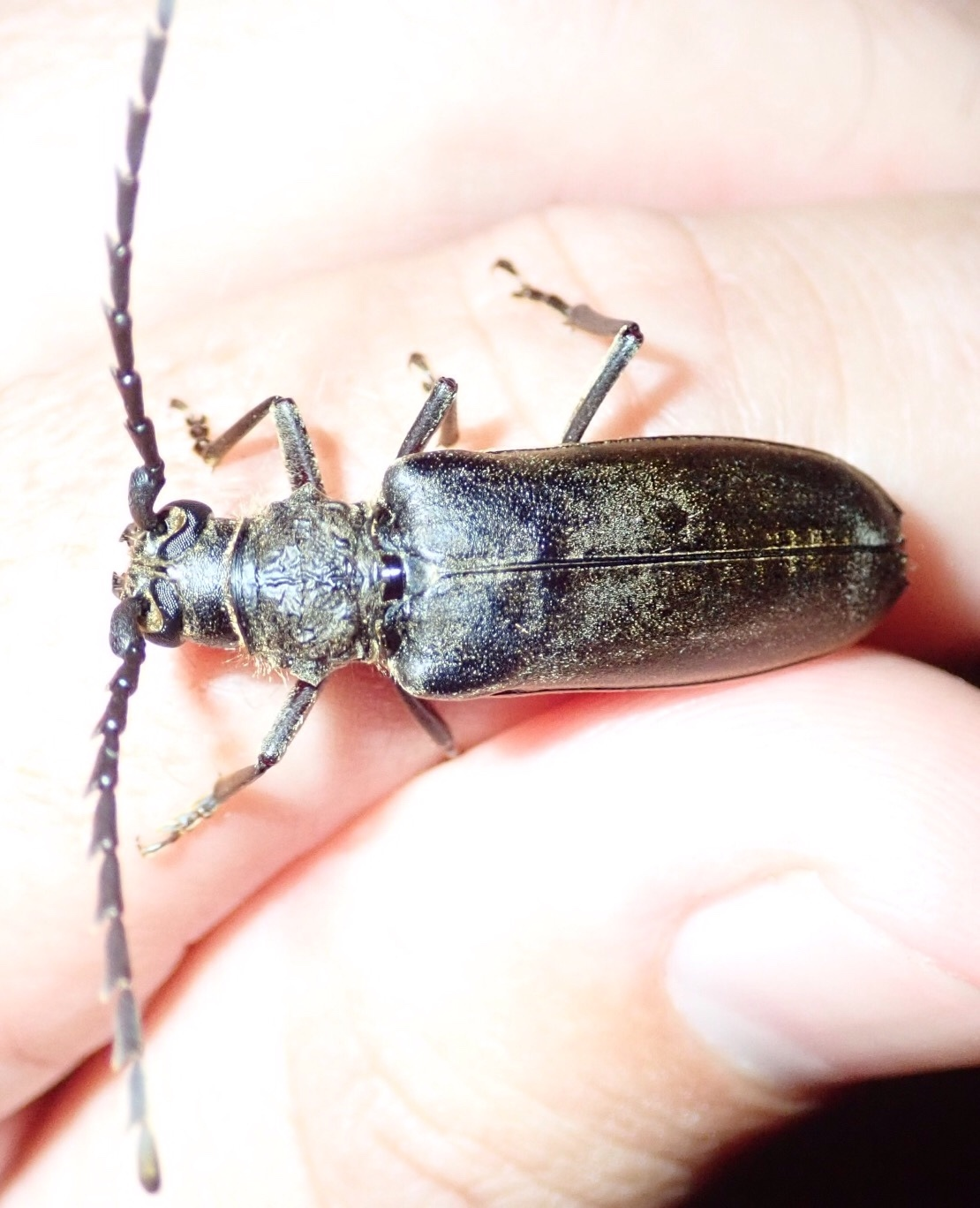
Neoplocaederus granulatus, Botswana

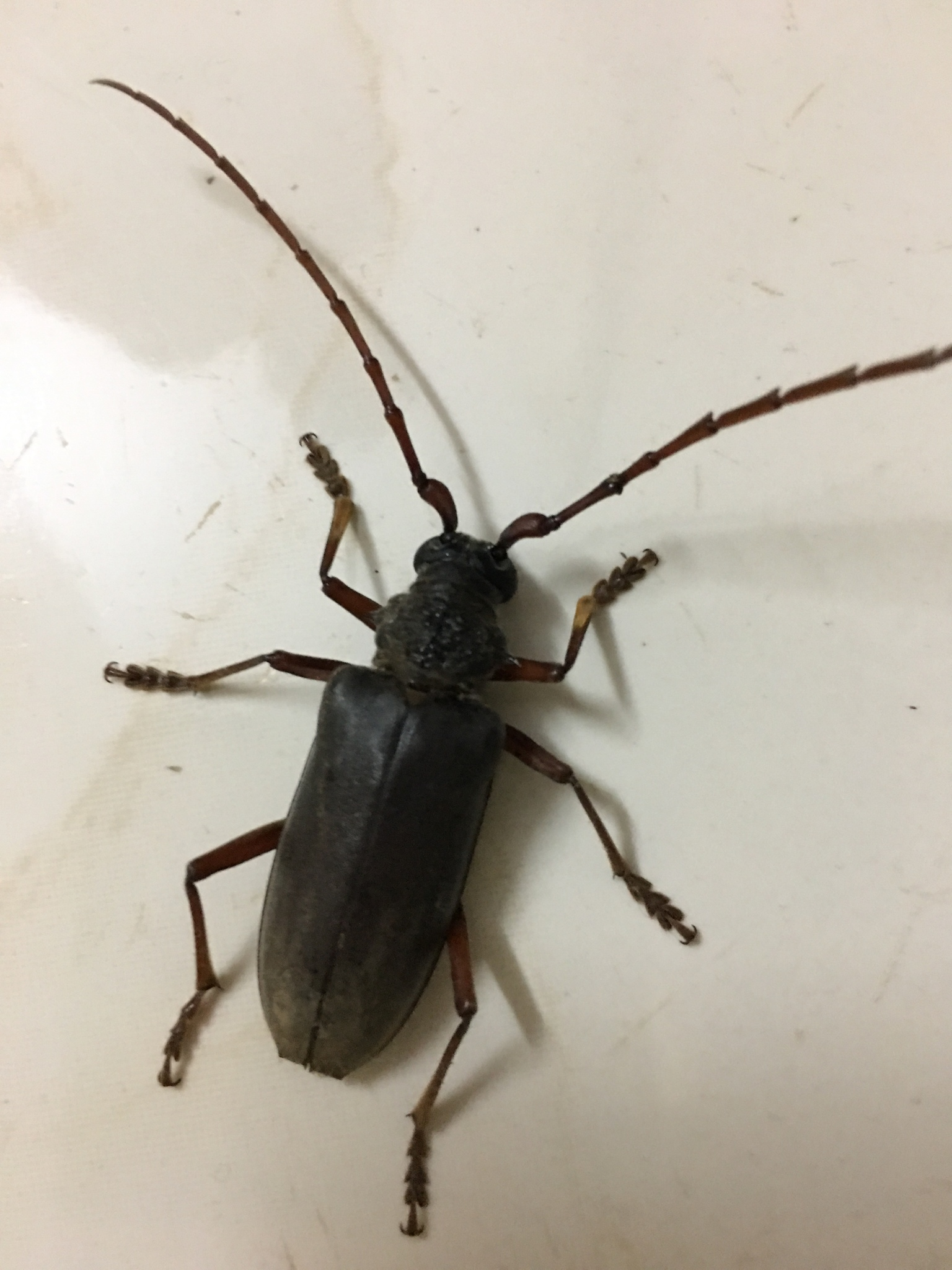
Neoplocaederus ferrugineus, India

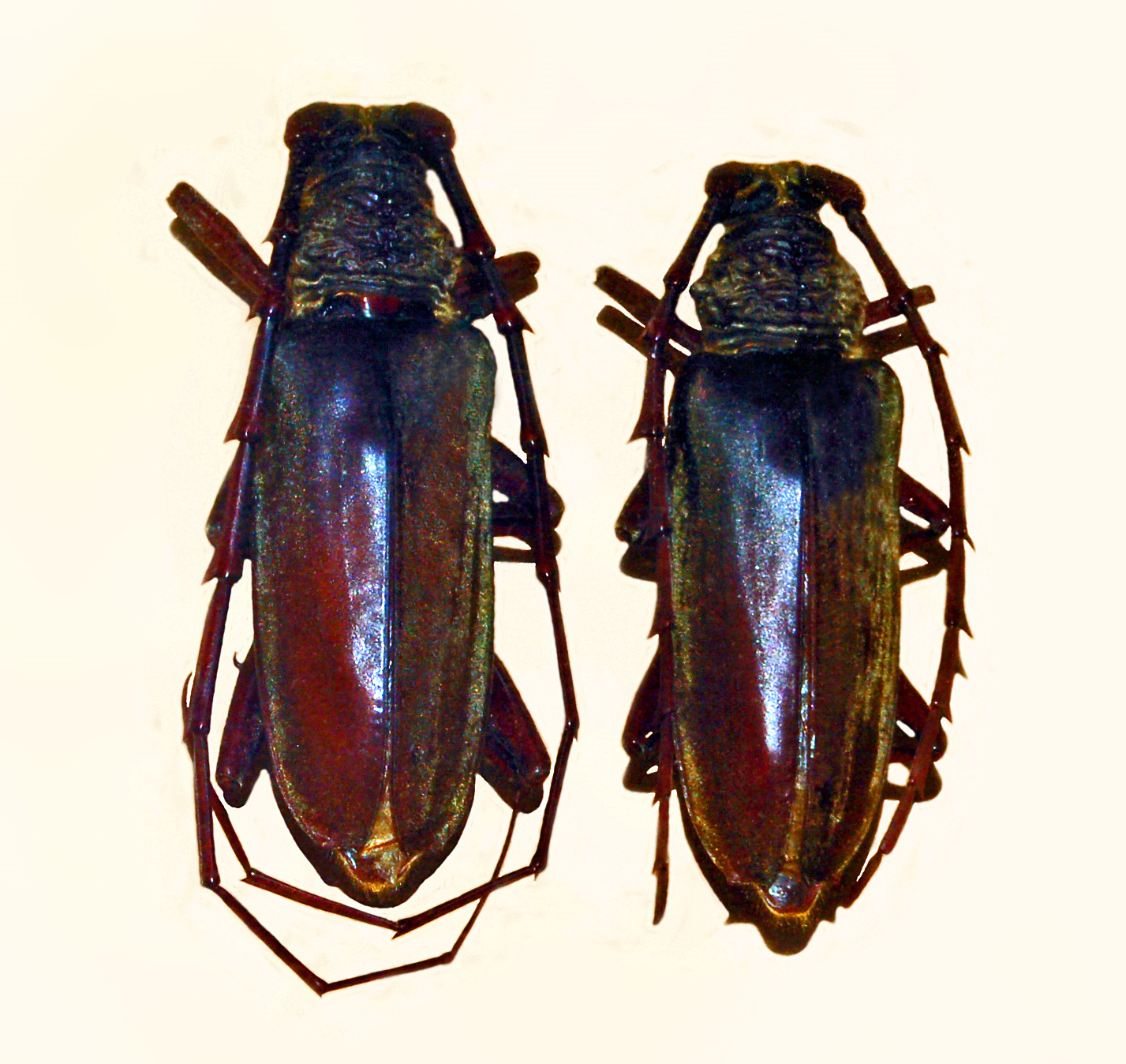
Neoplocaederus fucatus from São Tomé and Principe, male and female
