= Ambilobea =

Scientific classification
- Kingdom: Plantae
- Clade: Tracheophytes
- Clade: Angiosperms
- Clade: Eudicots
- Clade: Rosids
- Order: Sapindales
- Family: Burseraceae
- Genus: Ambilobea; Thulin, Beier & Razafim.
- Species: A. madagascariensis

Binomial name
- Ambilobea madagascariensis (Capuron) Thulin, Beier & Razafim.

Genus of flowering plants

Ambilobea is a genus of flowering plants belonging to the family Burseraceae. It is a dioecious tree or shrub, up about 20 m tall. Leaves are alternate, odd-pinnate. Inflorescences are axillary and flowers are inconspicuous.

Its native range is Madagascar.

It currently contains only one species: Ambilobea madagascariensis (Capuron) Thulin, Beier & Razafim.
