= Pachylobus =

Scientific classification
- Kingdom: Plantae
- Clade: Tracheophytes
- Clade: Angiosperms
- Clade: Eudicots
- Clade: Rosids
- Order: Sapindales
- Family: Burseraceae
- Genus: Pachylobus; G.Don

Genus of plants

Pachylobus is a genus of flowering plants belonging to the family Burseraceae.

Its native range is Nigeria to Zambia.

Species:

- Pachylobus bampsianus (Pierlot) Byng & Christenh.
- Pachylobus buettneri (Engl.) Guillaumin
- Pachylobus camerunensis (Onana) Byng & Christenh.
- Pachylobus ebatom (Aubrév. & Pellegr.) Byng & Christenh.
- Pachylobus heterotrichus Pellegr.
- Pachylobus igaganga (Aubrév. & Pellegr.) Byng & Christenh.
- Pachylobus klaineanus (Pierre) Guillaumin
- Pachylobus ledermannii Engl.
- Pachylobus letestui Pellegr.
- Pachylobus macrophyllus (Oliv.) Engl.
- Pachylobus normandii (Aubrév. & Pellegr.) Byng & Christenh.
- Pachylobus osika Guillaumin
- Pachylobus pubescens Vermoesen
- Pachylobus tessmannii Engl.
- Pachylobus trapnellii (Onana) Byng & Christenh.
- Pachylobus villiersianas (Onana) Byng & Christenh.
