= Haplolobus (plant) =

Scientific classification
- Kingdom: Plantae
- Clade: Tracheophytes
- Clade: Angiosperms
- Clade: Eudicots
- Clade: Rosids
- Order: Sapindales
- Family: Burseraceae
- Genus: Haplolobus; H.J.Lam

Genus of flowering plants

Haplolobus is a genus of plant in family Burseraceae.

Species include:

- Haplolobus acuminatus (K.Schum.) H.J.Lam
- Haplolobus anisander (Lauterb.) H.J.Lam
- Haplolobus beccarii Husson
- Haplolobus bintuluensis Kochummen
- Haplolobus borneensis H.J.Lam
- Haplolobus boswezensis Leenh.
- Haplolobus canarioides Leenh.
- Haplolobus celebicus H.J.Lam
- Haplolobus clementium Husson
- Haplolobus decipiens H.J.Lam
- Haplolobus floribundus (K.Schum.) H.J.Lam
- Haplolobus furfuraceus (Lauterb.) H.J.Lam
- Haplolobus hussonii H.J.Lam
- Haplolobus inaequifolius Kochummen
- Haplolobus kapitensis Kochummen
- Haplolobus lanceolatus H.J.Lam
- Haplolobus ledermannii (Lauterb.) H.J.Lam
- Haplolobus leeifolius (Lauterb.) H.J.Lam
- Haplolobus leenhoutsii Kochummen
- Haplolobus maluensis (Lauterb.) H.J.Lam
- Haplolobus megacarpus H.J.Lam
- Haplolobus mollis H.J.Lam
- Haplolobus monophyllus H.J.Lam
- Haplolobus monticola Husson
- Haplolobus nubigenus (Lauterb.) H.J.Lam
- Haplolobus pubescens H.J.Lam
- Haplolobus robustus H.J.Lam
- Haplolobus sarawakanus Kochummen
- Haplolobus triphyllus (Lauterb.) H.J.Lam
- Haplolobus versteeghii H.J.Lam
