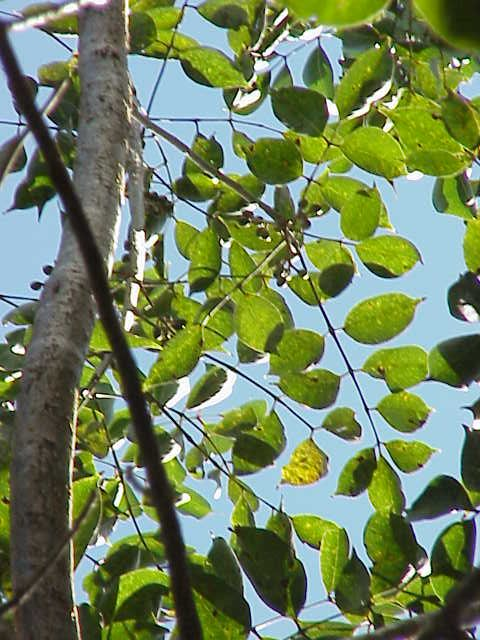
- Bursera simaruba (Gumbo-limbo)

Scientific classification
- Kingdom: Plantae
- Clade: Tracheophytes
- Clade: Angiosperms
- Clade: Eudicots
- Clade: Rosids
- Order: Sapindales
- Family: Burseraceae; Kunth

Genera
- See text

= Burseraceae =

Burseraceae Temporal range: Maastrichtian//Danian-Present

Family of flowering plants

The Burseraceae are a moderate-sized family of 17-19 genera and about 540 species of woody flowering plants. The actual numbers given in taxonomic sources differ according to taxonomic revision at the time of writing. The Burseraceae are also known as the torchwood family, the frankincense and myrrh family, or simply the incense tree family. The family includes both trees and shrubs; its species are native to tropical regions of Africa, Asia, Australasia, and the Americas.

Because of taxonomic revision, as the family size (in terms of genera and species) differs according to the time period of study; so, too, does the family's higher-level relationships, including order. Burseraceae is a genetically-supported monophyletic group since APG III and is frequently cited within the Sapindales. It is recognized as a sister group to the Anacardiaceae.

The Burseraceae are characterized by the generally non-allergenic resin they produce in virtually all plant tissue and their distinctive smooth, yet flaking, aromatic bark. The origins of the family can be traced to the Paleocene (about 65 Mya) when Beiselia mexicana first diverged in Mexico. The subsequent divergences in the family lineage and migration of species in the Eocene (53 Mya) out of North America have led to the current distribution of the species being primarily associated with the tropics. Though the family likely originated in North America, the greatest genetic diversity presently is found in the Southern Hemisphere. Tabonuco (Dacryodes excelsa) and gumbo limbo (Bursera simaruba) represent the economic, ethnobotanical, and ecological significance of the Burseraceae in the Western Hemisphere, while frankincense (Boswellia sacra) and myrrh (Commiphora myrrha) represent the same in the Eastern Hemisphere.

== Key characteristics ==
The Burseraceae trees or shrubs are characterized by resins (having triterpenoids and ethereal oils) that are present within the plant tissue from the vertical resin canals and ducts in the bark to the leaf veins. In fact, the synapomorphy of the Burseraceae is the smooth yet peeling or flaking aromatic bark. The clear, nonallergenic resins may smell like almonds, but at least the most well known resins, frankincense and myrrh, have a distinct odor. The leaves are generally alternate, spiral, and odd-pinnately compound with opposite, frequently long-petiolulate, entire to serrate, pinnately veined leaflets whose symmetry is distinctive in some genera. However, some members are known to have trifoliate or unifoliate leaves. The leaf and leaflet stalks and axis may be brown and scurfy, while the leaf base is swollen and may be concave adaxially. The family members tend to be without stipules. The determinate, axillary inflorescences carry small, radial, unisexual flowers. The plants tend to be dioecious. The flowers may have four or five faintly connate but imbricate sepals with an equal number of distinct, imbricate petals. Also, the stamens, that may contain nectar discs, have distinct glabrous filaments that occur in one or two whorls and in numbers equaling or twice the number of petals; the tricolporate pollen is contained within two locules of the anthers that open longitudinally along slits. The gynoecium contains 3–5 connate carpels, one style, and one stigma that is head-like to lobed. Each locule of the superior ovary has two ovules with axile placentation that are anatropous to campylotropous. The one- to five-pitted fruit is a drupe that opens at maturity. The endosperm is usually lacking in the embryo.

== Taxonomy ==
Some discrepancy exists in the literature about the size of the Burseraceae. Records say that the family has 17 to 18 genera and 500 to 540 to 726 species. Other authors cite different numbers: 16–20 genera and 600 species; 20 genera and 500–600 species; According to a pollen studies and molecular data, the family is split into three tribes: the Protieae, Bursereae, and Canarieae. The Protieae are composed of Protium (147 species and largest in this tribe), Crepidospermum, Garuga, and Tetragastris. The Bursereae, which are further split into subtribes Boswelliinae and Burserinae, contain Commiphora (nearly 200 species and largest in the family), Aucoumea, Beiselia, Boswellia, Bursera, and Triomma. Finally, the Canarieae are composed of Canarium (75 species and largest in this tribe), Dacryodes, Haplolobus, Pseudodacryodes, Rosselia, Santiria, Scutinanthe, and Trattinnickia. The morphology of the fruit, which is a drupe, helps to distinguish between the three tribes. Though the groupings have slightly changed since the 1990s, the Protieae are described as having a two- to five-parted drupe with either ‘free or adhering parts’ which are ‘not fused in the endocarp’; The Bursereae are described as having a drupe with parts that are fused in the endocarp, but an exocarp with dehiscing valves; and the Canarieae as simply having a drupe with parts that are fused in the endocarp.

This is a list of the 19 genera of the Burseraceae with placement in three tribes (and subtribes where applicable):

=== Subfamilies and genera ===
Bursereae

- Aucoumea Pierre
- Beiselia Forman
- Boswellia Colebrooke (frankincense)
- Bursera L. (Palo Santo)
- Commiphora Jacquin (myrrh)
- †Protocommiphora Reid & Chandler
- Garuga Roxburgh
- Triomma J. D. Hooker

Canarieae

- Ambilobea Thulin et al.
- Canarium Stickman
- Dacryodes Vahl
- Haplolobus H. J. Lam
- Pseudodacryodes Pierlot
- Rosselia Forman
- Santiria Blume
- Scutinanthe Thwaites
- Trattinnickia Willdenow

Protieae

- Protium Burmann f. (including Tetragastris) (copal)

Unplaced

- †Barghoornia Wolfe & Wehr (Ypresian Klondike Mountain Formation)
- †Debursera Kumar, Manchester & Judd
- Pachylobus G.Don

The earliest fossil records of the Burseraceae are from the Intertrappean Beds from the Cretaceous-Paleogene boundary of India, including the wood form genus Bursericarpum and the flower Debursera.

== Order ==
According to the literature, the Burseraceae have not been lumped with other families nor split up into several others. However, they have "jumped" orders several times. For example, in the early 19th century, the family seems to have been placed in the Burserales, with the Anacardiaceae and Podoaceae. In the mid-19th century and early 20th century, the family was placed in the Geraniales. Then, by the mid- and late-20th century, the family was moved to the Rutales. Finally, in the late 20th century, the family was (and today still is) located within the Sapindales. Families that are consistently found in the same order as the Burseraceae (except when in the Burserales) include the Rutaceae, Meliaceae, and Simaroubaceae. Only in recent studies were the Burseraceae and the Anacardiaceae seen as sister groups.

The Sapindales are contained within the malvids of the rosid clade within the eudicotyledons. The order contains nine to 15 families, 460 genera, and from 5,400 to 5,670 to 5,800 species. The currently recognized families include Aceraceae, Anacardiaceae, Burseraceae, Hippocastanaceae, Julianaceae, Meliaceae, Rutaceae, Sapindaceae, and Simaroubaceae. The Sapindales are a clade supported by DNA-based analyses on rbcL, atpB, and 18S sequences. Within the Sapindales are two clades that contain gum and resin: the Rutaceae-Meliaceae-Simaroubaceae clade and the Burseraceae-Anacardiaceae clade. The Burseraceae are thus not the only family in the Sapindales with this characteristic. The synapomorphies of the clade include pinnately compound alternately- or spirally-arranged leaves that may be palmately compound, trifoliate, or unifoliate, and small four- or five-merous flowers having a characteristic nectar disk and imbricate petals and sepals. Some of these characteristics also occur in the Rosales. However, the Sapindales and Rutales may actually form a complex, since many families "jump" between them. Indeed, rbcL sequence studies seem to indicate that a sapindalean/rutalean complex exists and may better represent the relationships of the families than the separate orders would. A study based on the chloroplast-encoded gene rbcL reconstructed cladograms that include families within both the Sapindales and Rutales. One such cladogram indicated that the Sapindales are robust and that the Burseraceae (and Anacardiaceae) are within a single clade of their own. This grouping seems to make sense, as both the Burseraceae and Anacardiaceae have secretory canals in the phloem and resin canals in the leaves, and are unique in the Sapindales for having biflavones in the leaf tissue. However, the two families have several distinguishing characteristics. The resin of the Burseraceae is nonallergenic and two ovules per carpel occur, whereas the resin of the Anacardiaceae can be allergenic or poisonous and one ovule per carpel is found. The Burseraceae-Anacardiaceae clade is sister to a robust cluster of three other families, the Sapindaceae-Aceraceae-Hippocastanaceae clade. The Rutaceae-Meliaceae-Simaroubaceae clade is sister to the Burseraceae-Anacardiaceae and Sapindaceae-Aceraceae-Hippocastanaceae clade. The rbcL technique is supported and considered acceptable until such time as other analytical methods become better developed.

== Biogeography ==
The Burseraceae are distributed throughout the world and primarily in the tropics, especially Malesia, Africa, and Central and South America. The three tribes can be linked to a specific region of the world, although this is not obligatory. For example, members of the tribe Protieae are generally found in South America, those of the Bursereae are found in Africa and Mesoamerica, while members of the Canarieae are found in Malesia. However, each tribe has a representative genus present in all the tropical regions: Dacryodes (Canarieae), Protium (Protieae), and Commiphora (Bursereae). The Burseraceae are found in a variety of habitats, including hot, dry desert and savannah, as well as in coastal mangrove forest and rain forest habitats. One study found that the family originated in North America during the Paleocene (about 65 Mya), when the earliest fossils of the Sapindales are found. During the Early to Middle Eocene (about 53 Mya), family members dispersed to eastern Laurasia (i.e. Europe and Asia) via the Boreotropical Land Bridge and the continents in the Southern Hemisphere, which is now the area of the greatest generic diversity of this family.

More specifically, the earliest diverging genus was Beiselia (of the Bursereae subtribe Boswelliinae) in either North America, Mexico, or the Caribbean in the Paleocene. Similar results from other studies find that Beiselia mexicana, a native of Mexico, is basal to the remaining Burseraceae. These results may indicate that the family originated in Mexico. The next divergence was in the Early Eocene when the Burserinae (i.e. Commiphora) diverged and emigrated from North America into Africa, Madagascar, and India. Commiphora dispersed throughout Africa during the Middle Eocene (about 44 Mya) and from Africa to Madagascar during the Oligocene (about 30 Mya) via the Mozambique Channel Land Bridge; the spread to India was more recent (about 5 Mya). The Canarieae and Boswelliinae (subtribes of Bursereae) dispersed from western Laurasia and spread eastward during the Eocene; fossils of Canarium, for example, from the Czech Republic date to the Late Oligocene (23 Mya). Finally, the Protieae originated in North America like the rest of the family, then migrated to Africa and Asia through the Tethys seaway in the Late Eocene (about 37 Mya), but then made its way back to South America via long-distance dispersal. By the late Oligocene (about 23Mya), all three Burseraceae tribes were extant and dispersed throughout the Northern Hemisphere.

In 2023, the earliest Burseraceae fossils were described from multiple well-preserved wood and flower specimens from the Maastrichtian and Danian-aged Intertrappean Beds of central India. This suggests that the Burseraceae may have originated in Insular India around the end of the Cretaceous, and dispersed to other continents throughout the early Cenozoic.

The mechanism of seed dispersal via animal link vectors (endozoochoric dispersal) may explain how most Burseraceae were able to expand their range so efficiently across the globe. Beiselia, Boswellia, and Triomma have dry fruits better suited for wind dispersal, but most Burseraceae have fleshy, edible fruit that is eaten by many animal dispersers. The seeds may provide a high reward in fat (24–73%) and protein (2.7–25.9%) if digested, but many animals eat just the fleshy part of the fruit and either discard the endocarp right away or excrete it some time later. Some known Burseraceae fruit consumers include hornbills (Buceros bicornis, Ceratogyma atrata, C. cylindricus, Penelopides panini), oilbirds (Steatnoris caripensis), fruit pigeons, warblers, vireos, orioles, flycatchers, tanagers, woodpeckers, loeries, primates (Cercopithecus spp., Lophocebus albigena), lemurs (Varecia variegate subsp. variegate), and sun bears (Helarctos malayanus). The fruits may also have been water dispersed.

== Economic significance and ethnobotanic uses ==
Several representative species within the Burseraceae typify the economic and ethnobotanic significance of the family. First, Dacryodes excelsa of the Canarieae is an important old-growth species found in the Caribbean. Second, Bursera simaruba of the Burserinae is a fast-growing ornamental that is one of a few representatives of the primarily tropical family in the United States. Finally, the namesakes of the family Boswellia carterii (frankincense) and Commiphora abyssinica (myrrh) are important economically and medicinally in several parts of the world. Though this is a small subset of the large number of potentially important species, these four members exemplify the wide use and importance of the Burseraceae. The latter three are frequently cited in the literature for their renowned importance.

Commonly known as tabonuco (or gommier, also candlewood), Dacryodes excelsa is a large, dominant tree found in Puerto Rico and other parts of the Caribbean. The seeds of the tree are a source of food for birds. Like all members, the tree releases sap from the bark when wounded. The clear sap oozes from the tree and hardens to a white, aromatic waxy resin that can be used to make candles and incense. Before the arrival of the Spaniards to Puerto Rico, the native Taínos used the resin to make torches. The wood itself is useful for constructing housing, furniture, boxes, small boats, and a variety of other wood-based products; the utility of the wood is comparable to that of mahogany and birch. In addition, species like Canarium littorale, Dacryodes costata, Santiria laevigata, and Santiria tomentosa from Malaysia, as well as Aucoumea klaineana and Canarium schweinfurthii from Africa, also produce valuable wood for construction projects and carpentry.

Several species in the genus Canarium are used as edible fruits (for example, Canarium album, the Chinese olive) and nuts (pili nuts, Canarium ovatum).

Species in the genus Bursera, especially the so-called elephant tree, grow primarily in Mexico, where their secretions are a raw material in making varnish. The Maya also used a Bursera sp. to make incense. However, the Bursera may also be considered an ornamental genus and a common representative of the family in the United States, especially in Florida (B. simaruba) and the Southwest (B. odorata, B. microphylla).

Naked Indian (also known as gumbo limbo), or Bursera simaruba, in particular, is found in Florida, Mexico, the Caribbean, Venezuela, and Brazil. The tree is also named the ‘tourist tree’ for its very distinctive flaking red bark; apparently, the tree occurs in tropical areas where many white tourists go on vacation. The resin from this tree can be used to make varnish and turpentine. In addition, the resin may also be used similarly to tiger balm (containing Cinnamomum camphora of the Lauraceae) to relieve sprains and muscle aches. The leaves are used to brew a tea to relieve inflammation. The bark serves as an antidote to skin irritation caused by Metopium toxiferum (also known as poisonwood, Florida poison tree, and hog gum) of the Anacardiaceae. The gumbo limbo grows quickly and can be used to make a living fence especially out of cut limbs that are placed straight into the ground or for restoration projects as a pioneer species. The tree is highly tolerant of high-intensity wind such as hurricane-force winds, so is planted in areas where hurricanes occur frequently, such as Florida and the Caribbean. The seeds of this species are also a source of food for birds.

Frankincense, or olibanum, (Boswellia carterii) and myrrh (Commiphora abyssinica) have long been valued for the aromatic resins they produce. These resins are extracted via tapping, or cutting of the bark to make it release sap. The liquid sap hardens and is gathered, sold as is or further processed and mixed with spices, seeds, and roots to make various forms of incense. Both species are native to parts of Northeast Africa (Somalia, frankincense; Somalia and Ethiopia, myrrh) and Arabia (Oman and Yemen, frankincense), but their distribution and use have been extended beyond these regions to India and China. The best frankincense is grown in Oman and the incense is widely used in worship in India. The ancient Egyptians prized frankincense for the resin they used to make the characteristic dark eyeliner and myrrh as an embalming agent for deceased pharaohs. At that time, myrrh was worth more than gold. In modern times resins from these trees are used in Chinese herbal medicine and Indian Ayurvedic medicine to treat several ailments. Pills containing small doses of frankincense and other ingredients are valued in oriental medicine for promoting blood flow and the movement of the qi (‘life force’ or ‘spiritual energy’). and myrrh is similarly claimed to promote blood flow, stimulate the stomach and digestion, and to be useful in treating diabetes, menopause, uterine tumors, amenorrhoea, and dysmenorrhea. Both frankincense (containing triterpene acids) and myrrh are used to relieve pain and inflammation as in arthritis and asthma.
