= Canarium pseudopimela =

Conservation status
- Vulnerable (IUCN 2.3)

Scientific classification
- Kingdom: Plantae
- Clade: Tracheophytes
- Clade: Angiosperms
- Clade: Eudicots
- Clade: Rosids
- Order: Sapindales
- Family: Burseraceae
- Genus: Canarium
- Species: C. pseudopimela

Binomial name
- Canarium pseudopimela Kochummen

Species of tree

Canarium pseudopimela is a tree of Borneo in the incense tree family Burseraceae. The specific epithet pseudopimela is from the Latin meaning "false pimela", referring to the species' resemblance to Canarium pimela.

== Description ==
Canarium pseudopimela grows as a small tree up to 12 metres (40 ft) tall with a trunk diameter of up to 15 cm (6 in). Its twigs are brown. The ellipsoid fruits measure up to 3 cm (1 in) long.

== Distribution and habitat ==
Canarium pseudopimela is endemic to Borneo where it is confined to Sarawak. Its habitat is lowland rain forests.
