= Canarium pseudodecumanum =

Conservation status
- Vulnerable (IUCN 2.3)

Scientific classification
- Kingdom: Plantae
- Clade: Tracheophytes
- Clade: Angiosperms
- Clade: Eudicots
- Clade: Rosids
- Order: Sapindales
- Family: Burseraceae
- Genus: Canarium
- Species: C. pseudodecumanum

Binomial name
- Canarium pseudodecumanum Hochr.

Species of tree

Canarium pseudodecumanum is a tree of tropical Asia in the incense tree family Burseraceae. The specific epithet pseudodecumanum is from the Latin meaning "false decumanum", referring to the species' resemblance to Canarium decumanum.

== Description ==
Canarium pseudodecumanum grows as a tree up to 40 metres (130 ft) tall with a trunk diameter of up to 120 cm (50 in). Its grey-white bark is smooth to scaly. The ellipsoid fruits measure up to 8 cm (3 in) long.

== Distribution and habitat ==
Canarium pseudodecumanum grows naturally in Sumatra, Peninsular Malaysia and Borneo. Its habitat is lowland forests on swamp land from sea-level to 280 m (900 ft) altitude.

== Uses ==
The tree's resin is used in boat construction. The fruit is considered edible. The seeds produce an edible oil.
