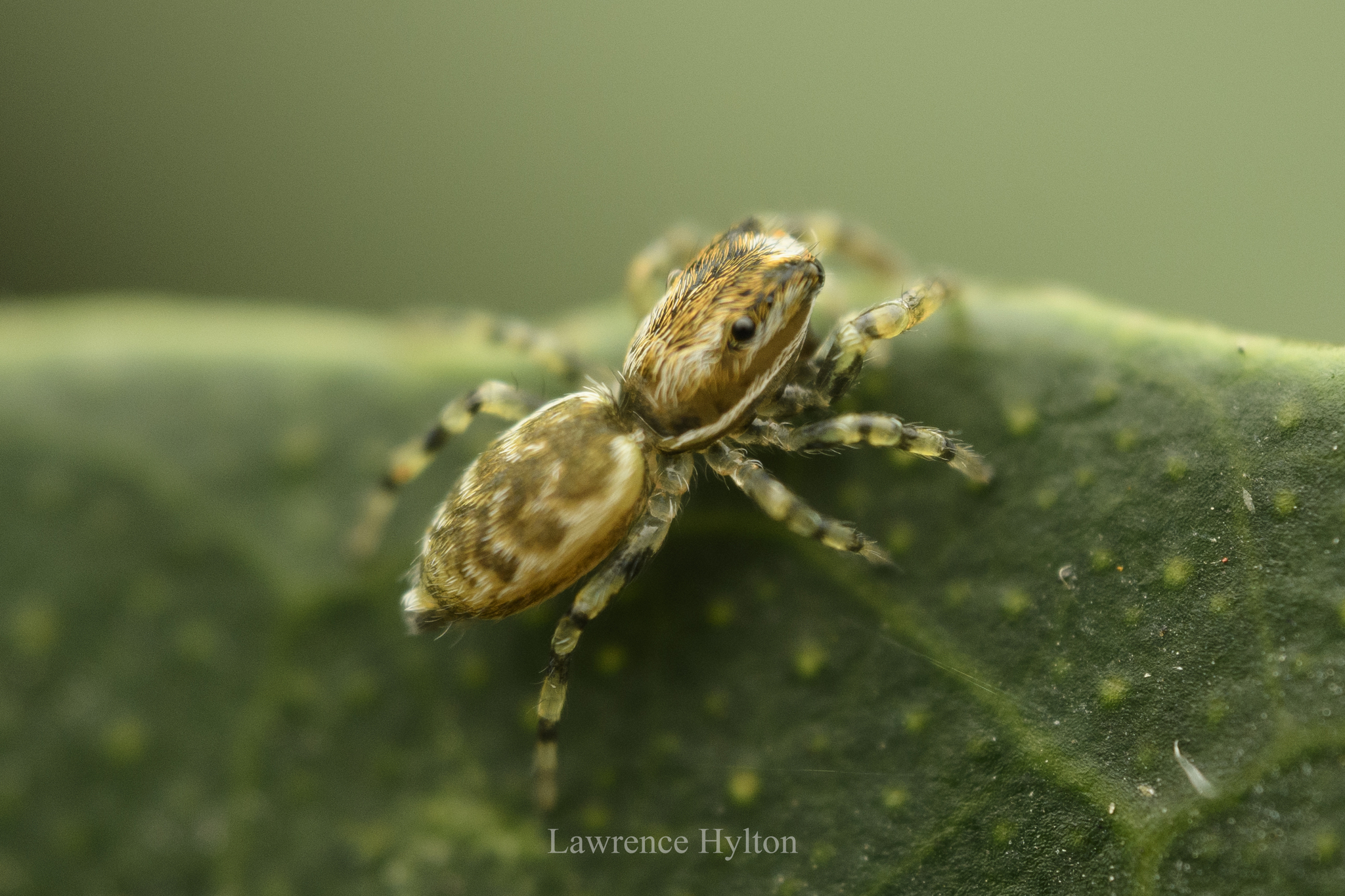
- Female from Hong Kong
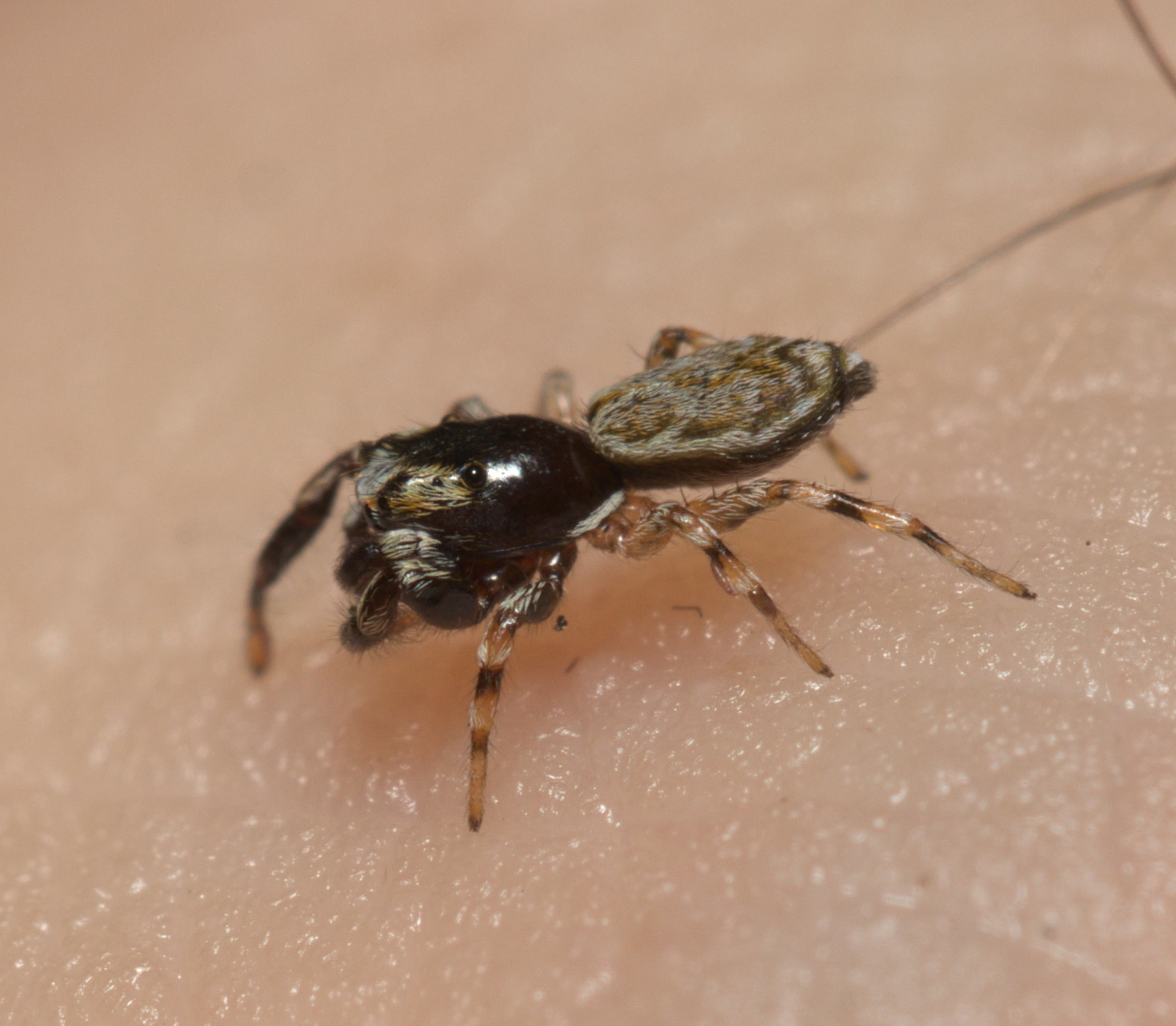
- Male from Hong Kong

Scientific classification
- Kingdom: Animalia
- Phylum: Arthropoda
- Subphylum: Chelicerata
- Class: Arachnida
- Order: Araneae
- Infraorder: Araneomorphae
- Family: Salticidae
- Genus: Qingattus; Yang, Wang & Zhang, 2024
- Species: Q. wulan

Binomial name
- Qingattus wulan Yang, Wang & Zhang, 2024

= Qingattus =

Species of spider

Qingattus wulan is a species of jumping spider in the genus Qingattus. It is the type species of the monotypic genus Qingattus and is endemic to China.

== Etymology ==
The genus name Qingattus combines the Chinese pinyin "qing" (晴) meaning "sunshine" with "attus", a common suffix for jumping spider genera. The specific epithet "wulan" is derived from the Chinese pinyin for "Canarium pimela" (烏欖), which is one of the preferred microhabitats of the species.

== Distribution ==
Q. wulan has been recorded from Guangdong Province and Chongqing in China. Specimens were collected from Tianlu Lake Forest Park in Guangzhou, Dinghushan National Nature Reserve in Zhaoqing, and Dayuandong Forest Park in Jiangjin District.

== Habitat ==
The species is a tree trunk dweller, typically found on the bark of trees including Canarium pimela.

== Description ==
Qingattus wulan is a small jumping spider. Males have a total length of 1.97–2.35 mm, while females are slightly larger at 2.15–2.52 mm.

The carapace is flat and brown, decorated with sparse white and pale-yellow scales in the eye region. The opisthosoma bears dense white, brown, and pale-yellow scales. A distinctive feature of the genus is that the anterior lateral eyes are positioned closer to the anterior median eyes compared to other jumping spiders in the tribe Chrysillini.

The chelicerae are brown and equipped with two promarginal teeth and one retromarginal tooth. In males, the first pair of legs is notably darker than the others.

Males have a characteristic palpal bulb with a thick embolus and strong embolic base. The retrolateral tibial apophysis extends almost the full length of the cymbium. Females possess a distinctive epigyne with a crescent-shaped pocket in the anterior half and short copulatory ducts leading to tubular spermathecae.
