= Nkang =

- Site location in Cameroon
- ~4.2667°N 11.3167°E
- Location: Monatélé, Cameroon
- Region: Sub-Saharan Africa

Nkang is an archaeological site located in the Centre region of central Cameroon, near the town of Monatélé.

Interest in Nkang and the surrounding area started upon the discovery of large abandoned settlements and filled pits from at least 2700 cal BP, making archaeologists curious about what information this site could provide about African history.

Archaeological investigations at Nkang provided evidence of agricultural cultivation in the form of phytoliths. In particular, the presence of bananas at Nkang indicate these agricultural practices are older than expected and may even predate the Bantu expansion.

== Excavation ==
Archaeologists conducted a study to analyze pits at the site to discover what was inside. Wet samples of soil from the excavated pits were sieved to extract phytolith plant material. They found soil, broken ceramics, tools, iron slags, charcoal, and remains of other fauna. Samples of ceramic, lithic, and faunal materials were sorted in marked bags and boxes, and other charcoal fragments were picked and taken for carbon dating.

Pottery from Nkang was found and distinguished by spherical, ellipsoid, and ovaloid shaped pots with collars and necks. The pottery from Nkang is also thicker on average than pottery from other sites in the region. Along with the stone tools found, iron slag was recovered from the pits, meaning iron working was practiced in the area at the time.

== Botanical findings ==
Botanical remains of plants exploited for their edible fruits were found. Some of what was found in the pits include charred samples of Elaeis guineensis and Canarium schweinfurthii, and phytoliths of species such as Musa sp., what scholars consider to be one of the most important discoveries of the archaeobotany at Nkang. In particular, the remains of phytoliths were found attached to pieces of pottery.

The phytolith evidence of Musa sp. is also unusual because there are no wild ancestors of it to naturally occur on the African continent, so it must have been introduced at some point. Additionally, the first evidence of Musa itself on the African continent is from analysis of samples found at Nkang. Carbon dating of phytolith remains in one of the pits at Nkang reveals they were used somewhere between 2400 and 2480 years ago. It is believed now thanks to this evidence that banana cultivation in Africa, which was poorly documented before, happened on the Atlantic coast of Africa at least 2500 years ago. These findings lead to the theory that the presence of early banana cultivation in the area could explain a higher density of villages and the early stages of the Bantu expansion as a whole.

This can be further supported by the language, with the proto-Bantu term *kondo referring to African plantains. This term originates from 2,750 to 2,100 BP, before the Bantu expansion’s migration of people and the start of new languages in the Bantu family. The rainforest climate of Nkang and Cameroon as a whole at that time period was ideal for the cultivation of Musa as well. The cultivation of the crop led to a more stable food supply and allowed for the higher population growth and village density found at Nkang that acted as a precursor to the Bantu expansion. This ability of Musa to thrive in rainforest environments further encouraged the spread of Bantu populations from Cameroon through the rainforest belt and more throughout south and east Africa. Additionally, the evidence of iron and metalworking found in the pits that phytolith evidence of Musa was found further indicates the intentional cultivation of this crop by people.

== Critical response ==
The current state of evidence for prehistoric banana cultivation is very meager. Any available archaeobotanical data found is significant as a result, so ensuring it is sound is important. The confirmed presence of banana phytoliths could change the way African prehistory is viewed, which is why some scientists are skeptical about whether the present evidence can concretely lead to that conclusion. With more recent studies on comparative criteria, scientists believe that the evidence found at Nkang should be reevaluated following old and new criteria for reliability of data. In particular, scientists point at the lack of specification regarding the abundance of phytoliths, with vague statements saying ‘moderate numbers.’ Reidentification of the phytoliths is also needed, as standards for identifying between Musa or Ensete phytoliths have changed to where the shape of the cone is no longer considered reliable evidence, and so the phytoliths should be reevaluated, otherwise the interpretation of them being of Musa origin could be considered simply preliminary. Critics also believe that if the identification and abundance are determined to be good, the interpretation of banana cultivation is valid, the present integration with linguistic evidence and genetics may support it but the opposite could also be possible.

Critics also say that if the banana species from India were indeed cultivated in Nkang, to spread they must have been spread from the eastern coast of Africa to the west where present-day Cameroon is located, and there is a lack of their presence elsewhere in the continent at the time. They also say that the authors did not address issues about the difficulty of distinguishing Musa phytoliths from other Musaceae ones and no comparison was made to earlier studies, or that the readers should have been given more information about the variations between specimens. There is also the lack of literary evidence or physical diffusion to other parts of Africa or the Middle East from India. The critics are of the belief that with the lack of true positive evidence to support the claims of Musa cultivation, it could be that the phytoliths found at Nkang are of the undomesticated Ensete variety.
