= Canarium pseudopatentinervium =

Conservation status
- Least Concern (IUCN 3.1)

Scientific classification
- Kingdom: Plantae
- Clade: Tracheophytes
- Clade: Angiosperms
- Clade: Eudicots
- Clade: Rosids
- Order: Sapindales
- Family: Burseraceae
- Genus: Canarium
- Species: C. pseudopatentinervium

Binomial name
- Canarium pseudopatentinervium H.J.Lam

Species of tree

Canarium pseudopatentinervium is a species of plant in the incense tree family Burseraceae. The specific epithet pseudopatentinervium is from the Latin meaning "false patentinervium", referring to the species' resemblance to Canarium patentinervium.

== Description ==
Canarium pseudopatentinervium grows as a tree up to 45 metres (150 ft) tall with a trunk diameter of up to 100 cm (40 in). Its yellow-brown bark is scaly to dimpled. The twigs are whitish. The ellipsoid fruits measure up to 7 cm (3 in) long.

== Distribution and habitat ==
Canarium pseudopatentinervium grows naturally in Sumatra and Borneo. Its habitat is lowland forests at around 100 m (300 ft) altitude.
