= Dendrobium nareshbahadurii =

Conservation status
- Critically Endangered (IUCN 3.1)

Scientific classification
- Kingdom: Plantae
- Clade: Tracheophytes
- Clade: Angiosperms
- Clade: Monocots
- Order: Asparagales
- Family: Orchidaceae
- Subfamily: Epidendroideae
- Genus: Dendrobium
- Species: D. nareshbahadurii

Binomial name
- Dendrobium nareshbahadurii H.B.Naithani

Species of orchid

Dendrobium nareshbahadurii is a critically endangered species of orchid found only in Arunachal Pradesh of India.

== Description ==
This is an epiphytic orchid with a 15-20 cm long stem. Thin and narrow oblong leaves of 6-7 x 0.6-0.7 cm. The inflorescence is 10-15 cm long bearing 3 to 10 flowers. Pale green and purple flowers that are 25 to 30 mm long with a purple lip shorter than the sepals.

It can be differentiated by closely resembling Dendrobium strongylanthum species by the relatively longer and narrower sepals and petals and side lobes of the lip.

== Distribution ==
This orchid was collected by H.B.Naithani and Dr. Kunwar Naresh Bahadur in October 1982 and described by Naithani in 1986. It was collected from a location named Jameri on the edge of the current Sessa Orchid Sanctuary in West Kameng district in Arunachal Pradesh. It was never seen after the initial collection.

== Ecology ==
This species of orchid was found in a forest with trees like Ficus punctata, Choerospondias axillaris, and Canarium strictum. It was discovered at an elevation of 600 meters and a possible distribution up to 1200 meters. It was found flowering in October.

== Etymology ==
This species was named honoring Dr. Kunwar Naresh Bahadur , botanist at Forest Research Institute, Dehra Dun, India for his contributions to systematic botany, who also collected the specimen along with Naithani.

== Conservation and Threats ==
This species has very little distribution information and was not seen again with a known occupancy of 10 km^{2}. It is protected by the CITES Append-II listing that restricts commercial trade of this species. No active conservation measure were known as of the 2020 IUCN assessment. Major threats for this species includes collection from the wild for taxonomic studies, Jhum cultivation, road construction around the location if its known population.
