= Canarium odontophyllum =

Scientific classification
- Kingdom: Plantae
- Clade: Embryophytes
- Clade: Tracheophytes
- Clade: Angiosperms
- Clade: Eudicots
- Clade: Rosids
- Order: Sapindales
- Family: Burseraceae
- Genus: Canarium
- Species: C. odontophyllum

Binomial name
- Canarium odontophyllum Miq.

Species of tree

Canarium odontophyllum, also referred to as the Borneo olive, is a fruit-bearing tree of the genus Canarium in the family Burseraceae. Native to Borneo, where it is locally known as dabai in Sarawak and kembayau in Sabah and Brunei. Its fruit is a prized seasonal delicacy in Sarawak, which earned the fruit a dedicated festival - Pesta Dabai - which is held annually since 2018 in Song, Sarawak.

== Description ==
The tree grows up to a height of 40 to 50 meters. The fruit outer skin is glossy black colour while the flesh is yellow with an elongated seed. Being in the same genus as the Pili nut (Canarium ovatum) the seeds are also edible, and similar to almonds or pistachios.

=== Cultivation ===
The tree is dioecious – the seedlings can be male, or hermaphrodite. Successful cultivation can be achieved through budding or grafting. Mr Harry Munjan, a former senior assistant Agriculture Department officer was the first to have been successful in cultivating the tree through budding back in the 2000s. He also introduced the new clones, ‘Laja’ and ‘Lulong’, in his own farm in Sri Aman, Sarawak.

== Uses ==
=== Culinary ===
Canarium odontophyllum fruit is colloquially known as "Sarawak olive" and can be eaten raw or blanched, eaten with sugar, salt or soy sauce upon serving. In Sarawak, the fruit has become an added ingredient in sauces and fried rice recipes. Besides being eaten in its original form, the fruit can be made into a paste, and can also be dried and milled into powder form for use in foods and drinks. Under commercialization, the fruit can be incorporated in pizzas, desserts, juices, and even mayonnaise.
