= Canarium fuscocalycinum =

Conservation status
- Vulnerable (IUCN 2.3)

Scientific classification
- Kingdom: Plantae
- Clade: Embryophytes
- Clade: Tracheophytes
- Clade: Angiosperms
- Clade: Eudicots
- Clade: Rosids
- Order: Sapindales
- Family: Burseraceae
- Genus: Canarium
- Species: C. fuscocalycinum

Binomial name
- Canarium fuscocalycinum Stapf ex Ridl.

Synonyms
- Canarium decipiens H.J.Lam

Species of flowering plant

Canarium fuscocalycinum is a tree of Borneo in the incense tree family Burseraceae. The specific epithet fuscocalycinum is from the Latin meaning "dark calyx".

== Description ==
Canarium fuscocalycinum grows as a tree up to 20 metres (70 ft) tall with a trunk diameter of up to 25 cm (10 in). Its twigs are rusty brown. The ellipsoid fruits measure up to 3.5 cm (1.4 in).

== Distribution and habitat ==
Canarium fuscocalycinum is endemic to Borneo where it is confined to Sarawak. Its habitat is lowland mixed dipterocarp forests.
