= Canarium pilosum subsp. borneensis =

Scientific classification
- Kingdom: Plantae
- Clade: Tracheophytes
- Clade: Angiosperms
- Clade: Eudicots
- Clade: Rosids
- Order: Sapindales
- Family: Burseraceae
- Genus: Canarium
- Species: C. pilosum
- Subspecies: C. p. subsp. borneensis

Trinomial name
- Canarium pilosum subsp. borneensis Leenh.

Synonyms
- Dacryodes scandens Husson

Subspecies of tree

Canarium pilosum subsp. borneensis is a subspecies of Canarium pilosum. It is a tree in the family Burseraceae. The subspecies is named for Borneo.

== Description ==
Canarium pilosum subsp. borneensis grows up to 27 metres (90 ft) tall with a trunk diameter of up to 25 centimetres (10 in). The bark is smooth and pale brown. Stipules are absent in this subspecies. The oblong fruits measure up to 3 cm (1 in) long.

== Distribution and habitat ==
Canarium pilosum subsp. borneensis is endemic to Borneo and occurs uncommonly.
