= Canarium elegans =

Conservation status
- Endangered (IUCN 3.1)

Scientific classification
- Kingdom: Plantae
- Clade: Tracheophytes
- Clade: Angiosperms
- Clade: Eudicots
- Clade: Rosids
- Order: Sapindales
- Family: Burseraceae
- Genus: Canarium
- Species: C. elegans

Binomial name
- Canarium elegans Daly, Raharim. & Federman, 2015

Species of tree

Canarium elegans is a species of tree in the family Burseraceae. It is native to Madagascar.

== Description ==
Canarium elegans is a tree which grows from 12 to 18 meters tall. It starts flowering in January and fruits from February to October.

== Range and habitat ==
Canarium elegans is native to northeastern Madagascar, from the Masoala Peninsula to Marojejy National Park. It is known from four locations, with an estimated extent of occurrence of 5,197 km^{2} and an estimated area of occupancy of 24 km^{2}. It inhabits humid evergreen lowland forests, including dense lowland forest, sub-littoral forest, and wet forest on steep slopes, between sea level and 400 meters elevation.

== Conservation and threats ==
There are six known subpopulations. The species' population is thought to be decreasing from illegal selective logging and habitat loss caused by deforestation for shifting cultivation and mining. The species' conservation status is assessed as endangered.
