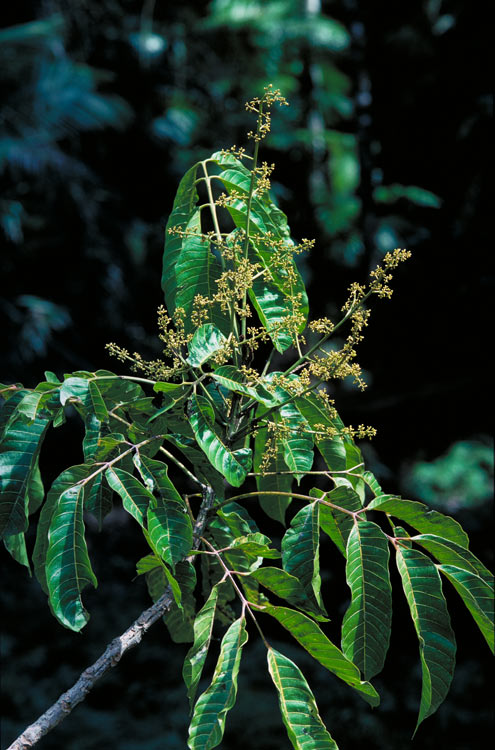
- Foliage and flowers

Conservation status
- Vulnerable (EPBC Act)
- Vulnerable (NCA)

Scientific classification
- Kingdom: Plantae
- Clade: Tracheophytes
- Clade: Angiosperms
- Clade: Eudicots
- Clade: Rosids
- Order: Sapindales
- Family: Burseraceae
- Genus: Canarium
- Species: C. acutifolium

Binomial name
- Canarium acutifolium (DC.) Merr.
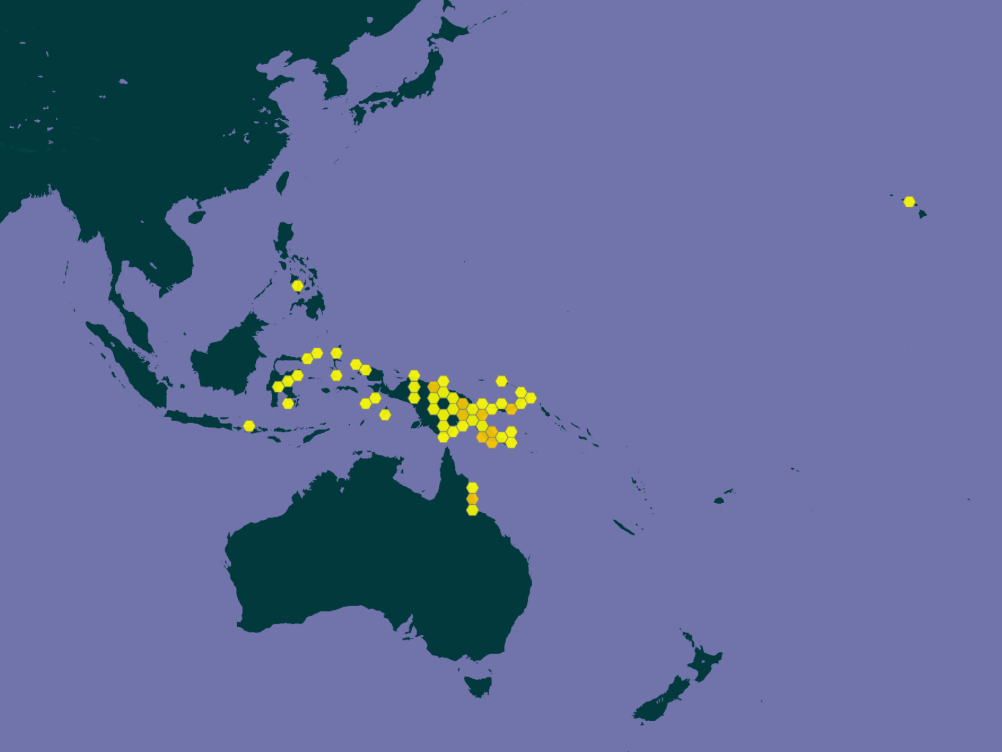
- Distribution of C. acutifolium

Synonyms
- Canarium lineistipula (K.Schum. & Lauterb.) H.J.Lam; Canarium longiflorum Zipp.; Canarium longiflorum Zipp. ex Miq.; Canarium nigrum Roxb.; Canarium rostratum Zipp.; Canarium rostratum Zipp. ex Blume; Marignia acutifolia DC.; Pimela acutifolia (DC.) Blume; Pimela laxiflora Blume; Santiria lineistipula K.Schum. & Lauterb.

= Canarium acutifolium =

Species of plant

Canarium acutifolium is a species of plant in the family Burseraceae, native to eastern Malesia, Papuasia and Queensland.

== Description ==
It is a large tree up 40 m high and a trunk diameter of up to 70 cm. The bark is grey or brown with lenticels arranged vertically. The large compound leaves, which may reach 60 cm in length (including the petiole), are arranged spirally on the branches. They have 4–6 pairs of leaflets plus a terminal leaflet. The petiole is swollen at the base and there are two quite large, linear stipules about 2 cm long which are shed after a short time.

The leaflets are glossy dark green above and dull green below; they are held on petiolules about 5–15 mm long (45 mm for the terminal leaflet) with pulvini at both ends. The leaflets measure up to 30 cm long and 12 cm wide and have between 15 and 17 pairs of lateral veins. The veins are pale yellow or cream, a striking contrast against the dark green of the blade, and are raised on both the upper and lower surfaces.

This species is dioecious, meaning that male and female flowers are borne on separate plants. The inflorescences are panicles produced in the leaf axils. Flowers are very small with three pale petals about 3 mm long. The fruit is a blue ellipsoid drupe about 15 mm long containing a single seed.

== Taxonomy ==
In 1917 botanist Elmer D. Merrill was the first to formally describe this species, based on de Candolle's 1825 name Marignia acutifolia which was in turn based on Rumphius's earlier description from Ambon Island, in the Maluku Islands. Merrill also based his description on a 1913 type specimen collection from Ambon by Robinson to represent Rumphius's description and on other synonymous names described in between these times.

The species has four recognised varieties, three have descriptions in Flora Malesiana and more recently in 2000 botanist Wayne Takeuchi described a new fourth variety of isolated known occurrence in New Guinea:

- C. acutifolium (DC.) Merr. var. acutifolium — New Guinea, Moluccas, New Britain, New Ireland, Bougainville, lowland Wet Tropics NE. Qld Australia

– differs from the other three varieties in flowers having 3 stamens instead of 6.

- C. acutifolium var. aemulans Hewson — New Britain, NE. New Guinea
- C. acutifolium var. celebicum Leenh. — central Sulawesi
- C. acutifolium var. pioriverensis Takeuchi — known only from lowland forest in the Crater Mt. area of New Guinea

In Australia, C. acutifolium var. acutifolium grows naturally below about 100 m (330 ft) altitude in the scarce remaining lowland rainforests of the Wet Tropics region of north-eastern Queensland. These only known natural populations of the species in the nation have obtained the national and Qld governments' "vulnerable" species conservation status.
