= Canarium kinabaluense =

Scientific classification
- Kingdom: Plantae
- Clade: Tracheophytes
- Clade: Angiosperms
- Clade: Eudicots
- Clade: Rosids
- Order: Sapindales
- Family: Burseraceae
- Genus: Canarium
- Species: C. kinabaluense

Binomial name
- Canarium kinabaluense Leenh.

Species of tree

Canarium kinabaluense is a tree in the family Burseraceae. It is named for Mount Kinabalu in East Malaysia's Sabah state.

== Description ==
Canarium kinabaluense grows up to 25 metres (80 ft) tall with a trunk diameter of up to 50 centimetres (20 in). The smooth bark is grey. The spindle-shaped fruits are green, drying brown, and measure up to 8 cm (3 in) long.

== Distribution and habitat ==
Canarium kinabaluense is endemic to Borneo. Its habitat is lowland to submontane forests from 300 metres (1,000 ft) to 1,500 metres (5,000 ft) elevation.
