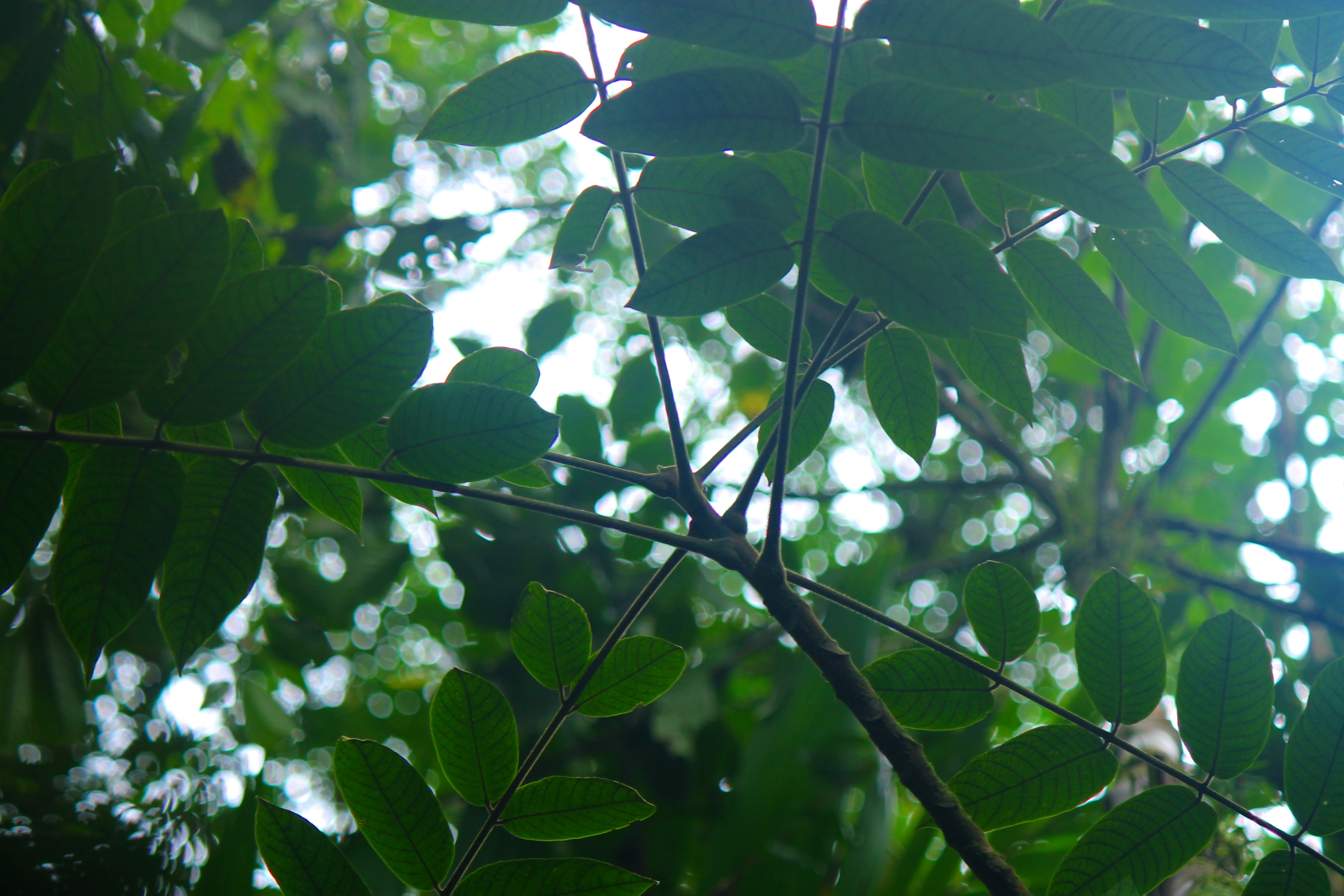
- Leaves and petioles

Conservation status
- Least Concern (IUCN 3.1)

Scientific classification
- Kingdom: Plantae
- Clade: Tracheophytes
- Clade: Angiosperms
- Clade: Eudicots
- Clade: Rosids
- Order: Sapindales
- Family: Burseraceae
- Genus: Canarium
- Species: C. hirsutum

Binomial name
- Canarium hirsutum Willd.

Synonyms
- List: Canariopsis altissima Miq.; Canariopsis hirsuta Miq.; Canariopsis hispida Miq.; Canarium ahernianum Merr.; Canarium altissimum Blume; Canarium bersamifolium G.Perkins; Canarium costulatum Elmer; Canarium ellipsoideum Merr.; Canarium greshoffii Koord.; Canarium hirsutum var. beccarii Leenh.; Canarium hirsutum var. leeuwenii Leenh.; Canarium hirsutum var. majus Hassk.; Canarium hirsutum f. minor Hochr.; Canarium hirsutum subsp. multicostulatum Leenh.; Canarium hirsutum var. scabrum Blume; Canarium hirsutum f. scabrum (Blume) Leenh.; Canarium hirsutum var. tomentellum Engl.; Canarium hispidum Blume; Canarium leeuwenii H.J.Lam; Canarium multijugum H.J.Lam; Canarium multipinnatum Llanos; Canarium nervosum Elmer; Canarium oxygonum Quisumb. & Merr.; Canarium palawense Lauterb.; Canarium racemosum Merr.; Canarium radlkoferi G.Perkins; Canarium riedelianum Engl.; Canarium robustum Merr.; Canarium subcordatum Ridl.; Canarium warburgianum G.Perkins

= Canarium hirsutum =

Species of tree

Canarium hirsutum is a tree in the family Burseraceae. The specific epithet hirsutum comes from the Latin meaning 'bristly', referring to the rough hairs of the fruit.

== Description ==
Canarium hirsutum grows up to 25 metres (80 ft) tall with a trunk diameter of up to 60 centimetres (24 in). The fruits are oblong to ovoid and measure up to 3.5 cm (1 in) long.

== Distribution and habitat ==
Canarium hirsutum grows widely in Malesia and Papuasia and is also found in the Caroline Islands and Solomon Islands. Its habitat is mixed dipterocarp forest from sea-level to 1,800 metres (6,000 ft) elevation.
