= Canarium sarawakanum =

Conservation status
- Vulnerable (IUCN 2.3)

Scientific classification
- Kingdom: Plantae
- Clade: Tracheophytes
- Clade: Angiosperms
- Clade: Eudicots
- Clade: Rosids
- Order: Sapindales
- Family: Burseraceae
- Genus: Canarium
- Species: C. sarawakanum

Binomial name
- Canarium sarawakanum Kochummen

Species of tree

Canarium sarawakanum is a tree of Borneo in the incense tree family Burseraceae. The specific epithet sarawakanum is from the Latin, referring to the species being native to Sarawak.

== Description ==
Canarium sarawakanum grows as a small tree up to 8 metres (30 ft) tall with a trunk diameter of up to 10 cm (4 in). Its twigs are reddish brown. The ellipsoid fruits measure up to 5.5 cm (2 in) long.

== Distribution and habitat ==
Canarium sarawakanum is endemic to Borneo where it is confined to Sarawak. Its habitat is lowland to submontane forests from sea-level to 900 m (3,000 ft) elevation.
