= Canarium caudatum =

Conservation status
- Least Concern (IUCN 3.1)

Scientific classification
- Kingdom: Plantae
- Clade: Tracheophytes
- Clade: Angiosperms
- Clade: Eudicots
- Clade: Rosids
- Order: Sapindales
- Family: Burseraceae
- Genus: Canarium
- Species: C. caudatum

Binomial name
- Canarium caudatum King

Synonyms
- Canarium pauciflorum Ridl.

Species of tree

Canarium caudatum is a species of tree in the family Burseraceae. The specific epithet caudatum means 'tailed', referring to the tapering of the tree's leaflet.

== Description ==
Canarium caudatum grows up to 36 metres (120 ft) tall with a trunk diameter of up to 40 centimetres (16 in). The bark is scaly and grey. The flowers are yellow-brown. The fruits are spindle-shaped and measure up to 8 cm (3 in) long.

== Distribution and habitat ==
Canarium caudatum is native to Sumatra, Peninsular Malaysia and Borneo. Its habitat is lowland mixed dipterocarp and kerangas forests from sea-level to 230 metres (800 ft) altitude.
