= Canarium dichotomum =

Scientific classification
- Kingdom: Plantae
- Clade: Tracheophytes
- Clade: Angiosperms
- Clade: Eudicots
- Clade: Rosids
- Order: Sapindales
- Family: Burseraceae
- Genus: Canarium
- Species: C. dichotomum

Binomial name
- Canarium dichotomum (Blume) Miq.

Synonyms
- Canarium dichotomum var. lucidula Miq.; Canarium endertii H.J.Lam

Species of tree

Canarium dichotomum is a tree in the family Burseraceae. The specific epithet dichotomum is from the Latin meaning 'forked', referring to the branching of the inflorescences.

== Description ==
Canarium dichotomum grows up to 27 metres (90 ft) tall with a trunk diameter of up to 25 centimetres (10 in). The brownish to reddish bark is smooth to scaly. The male inflorescences are dichotomously branched. The fruits are oblong and measure up to 4 cm (2 in) long.

== Distribution and habitat ==
Canarium dichotomum grows naturally in Sumatra and Borneo. Its habitat is lowland forests, rarely in submontane forest, from sea-level to 1,200 metres (4,000 ft) altitude.
