= Canarium australasicum =

Scientific classification
- Kingdom: Plantae
- Clade: Tracheophytes
- Clade: Angiosperms
- Clade: Eudicots
- Clade: Rosids
- Order: Sapindales
- Family: Burseraceae
- Genus: Canarium
- Species: C. australasicum

Binomial name
- Canarium australasicum (F.M.Bailey) Leenh.

Synonyms
- Bursera australasica F.M.Bailey (– base name)

Species of flowering plant

Canarium australasicum, commonly named mango bark, brown cudgerie or parsnip wood, is a species of rainforest trees, of the plant family Burseraceae. They are endemic to Australia, in eastern Queensland and far northeastern New South Wales.

These trees earliest formally published species name was Bursera australasica in 1892 by Frederick M. Bailey, Queensland colonial botanist from 1881 to 1915. In 1913 Bailey subsequently recognised them as the genus and species name Canarium australasicum, in his publication Comprehensive Catalogue of Queensland Plants, which recorded a precious selection of proper Aboriginal language names for this and many more species names, but missed formally publishing this new name combination. In 1952 this name combination was formally published by Pieter W. Leenhouts.
