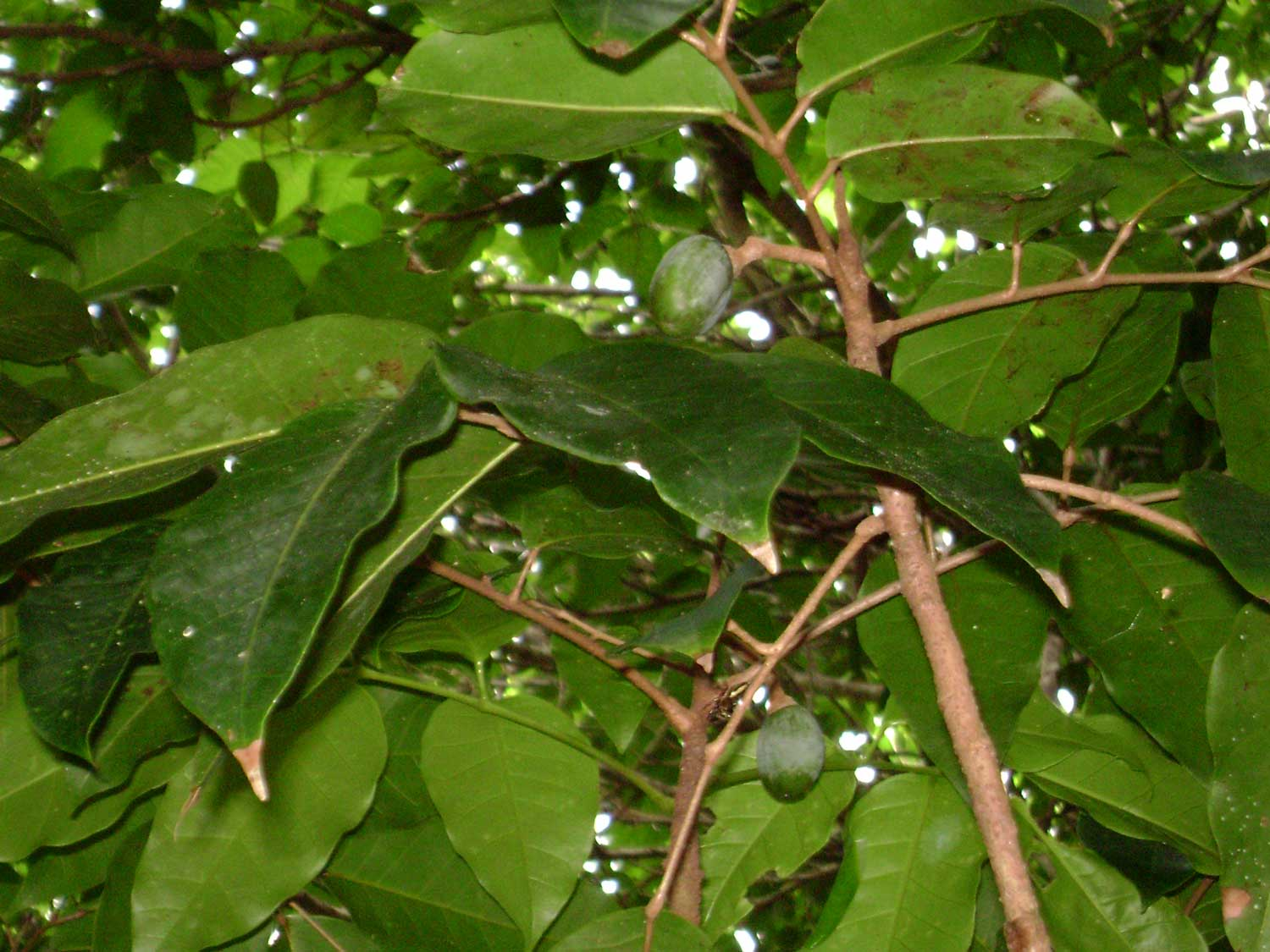
- Fruiting branch of Canarium harveyi

Scientific classification
- Kingdom: Plantae
- Clade: Tracheophytes
- Clade: Angiosperms
- Clade: Eudicots
- Clade: Rosids
- Order: Sapindales
- Family: Burseraceae
- Genus: Canarium; L. (1754)

Species
- About 120, see text

Synonyms
- Canariellum Engl. (1896); Canariopsis Miq. (1859); Colophonia Comm. ex Kunth (1824); Lipara Lour. ex Gomes Mach. (1868); Mehenbethene Besler ex Gaertn. (1790); Nanari Adans. (1763); Pimela Lour. (1790); Rumphia L. (1753); Sonzaya Marchand (1867); Strania Noronha (1790), nom. nud.

= Canarium =

Genus of trees

Canarium is a genus of about 120 species of tropical and subtropical trees, in the family Burseraceae. They grow naturally across tropical Africa, south and southeast Asia, Indochina, Malesia, Australia and western Pacific Islands; including from southern Nigeria east to Madagascar, Mauritius, Sri Lanka and India; from Burma, Malaysia and Thailand through the Malay Peninsula and Vietnam to south China, Taiwan and the Philippines; through Borneo, Indonesia, Timor and New Guinea, through to the Solomon Islands, Vanuatu, New Caledonia, Fiji, Samoa, Tonga and Palau.

Canarium species grow up to large evergreen trees of 40–50 m (130–160 ft) tall, and have alternately arranged, pinnate leaves. They are dioecious, with male and female flowers growing on separate trees.

== Species ==
As of January 2024, Plants of the World Online accepts 121 species. The brief species distribution information was sourced from Flora Malesiana, the Flora of China (series), the Australian Tropical Rainforest Plants information system, and Plants of the World Online.

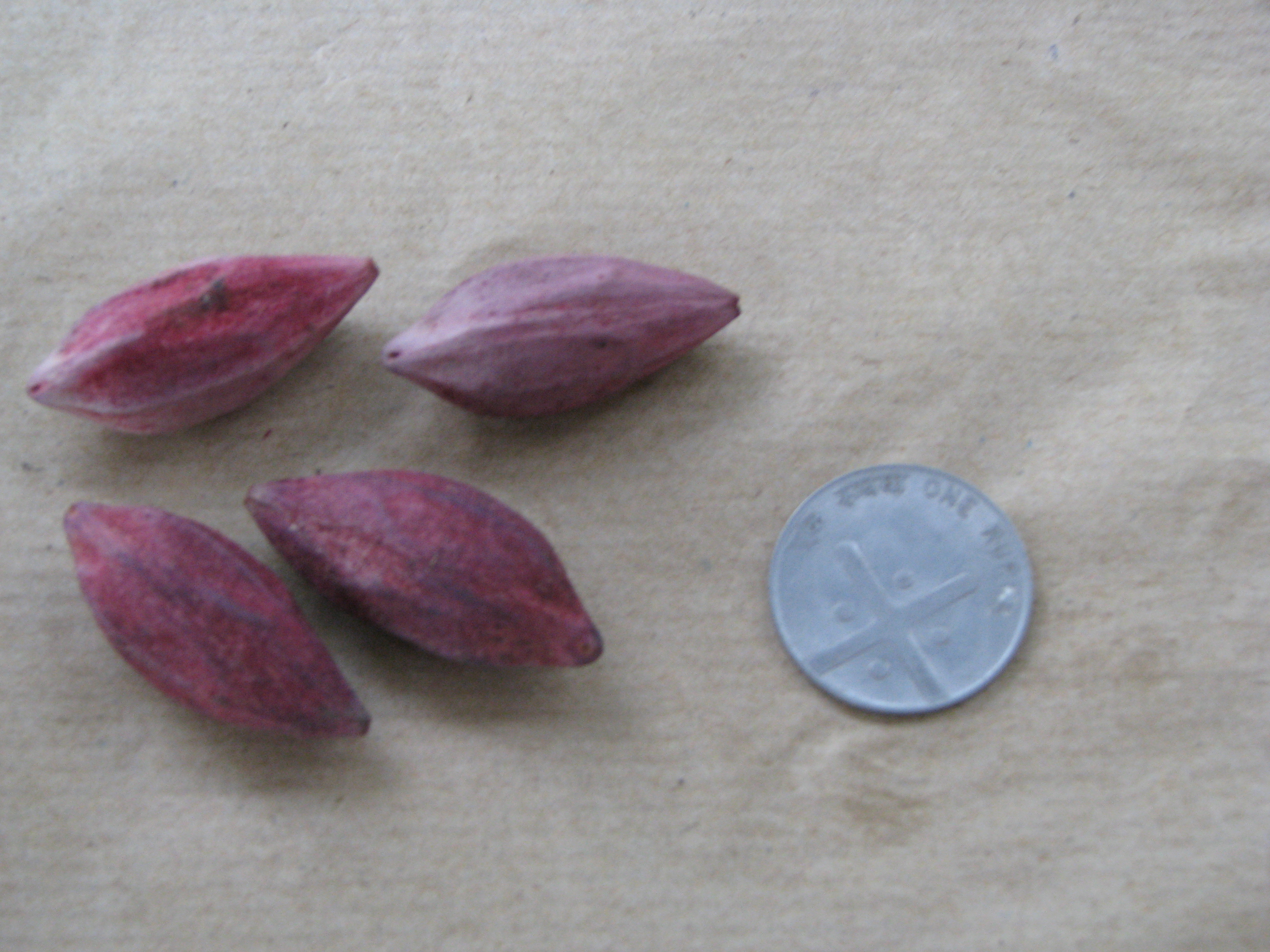
Canarium resiniferum seeds dispersed by hornbills in Pakke Tiger Reserve

- Canarium acutifolium (DC.) Merr. – New Guinea, Maluku, Sulawesi, New Britain, New Ireland, Bougainville, Qld Australia
- Canarium album (Lour.) DC. Chinese white olive (橄欖) – Taiwan, S China, Vietnam
- Canarium ampasindavae Daly, Raharim. & Federman – Madagascar
- Canarium apertum H.J.Lam – Sumatra, Malay Peninsula, Borneo
- Canarium arcuatum Daly, Raharim. & Federman – Madagascar
- Canarium asperum Benth. – New Guinea, Maluku, Sulawesi, Philippines, Borneo, Java, Sumbawa, Sumba, Flores, Timor, Solomon Is.,
- Canarium australasicum (F.M.Bailey) Leenh. – Qld, NSW, Australia endemic
- Canarium australianum F.Muell. – New Guinea, Qld, NT, WA, Australia
- Canarium balansae Engl. – New Caledonia endemic
- Canarium balsamiferum Willd. – Maluku, Sulawesi
- Canarium batjanense Leenh. – Maluku
- Canarium bengalense Roxb. – India, Burma, Laos, Thailand, S China
- Canarium betamponae Daly, Raharim. & Federman – Madagascar
- Canarium boivinii Engl. – northeastern Madagascar
- Canarium bullatum (Leenh.) Daly, Raharim. & Federman – northern and northeastern Madagascar
- Canarium caudatum King – Sumatra, Malay Peninsula, Borneo
- Canarium cestracion Leenh. – E New Guinea
- Canarium chinare Grutt. & H.J.Lam – Solomon Is., Admiralty Is.
- Canarium cinereum Guillaumin – Vietnam
- Canarium compressum Daly, Raharim. & Federman – Madagascar
- Canarium copaliferum A.Chev. – Vietnam
- Canarium decumanum Gaertn. – E Borneo, Maluku, New Guinea, Sulawesi
- Canarium denticulatum Blume – Andaman Is., Burma, Sumatra, Malay Penin., Java, Borneo, Philippines
- Canarium dichotomum (Blume) Miq. – Sumatra, Borneo
- Canarium divergens Engl. – Borneo
- Canarium egregium Daly, Raharim. & Federman – Madagascar
- Canarium elegans Daly, Raharim. & Federman — Madagascar
- Canarium engleri H.J.Lam – Vietnam
- Canarium euphyllum Kurz – Andaman Is.
- Canarium euryphyllum G.Perkins – Philippines
- Canarium ferrugineum Daly, Raharim. & Federman – Madagascar
- Canarium findens Daly, Raharim. & Federman – Madagascar
- Canarium fugax Daly, Raharim. & Federman – Madagascar
- Canarium fuscocalycinum Stapf ex Ridl. – Borneo
- Canarium galokense Daly, Raharim. & Federman – Madagascar
- Canarium globosum Daly, Raharim. & Federman – Madagascar
- Canarium gracile Engl. – Philippines
- Canarium grandifolium (Ridl.) H.J.Lam – Malay Peninsula
- Canarium harveyi Seem. – Fiji, Niue, Santa Cruz Islands, Solomon Islands, Tonga, Vanuatu, Wallis and Futuna
- Canarium hirsutum Willd. – New Guinea to throughout Malesia, Solomon Is., Palau
- Canarium indicum L. – New Guinea, New Britain, New Ireland, Solomon Is., Vanuatu, Maluku, Sulawesi
- Canarium indistinctum Daly, Raharim. & Federman – Madagascar
- Canarium intermedium H.J.Lam – S Sumatra
- Canarium kaniense Lauterb. – New Guinea
- Canarium karoense H.J.Lam – N Sumatra
- Canarium kerrii Craib – Thailand
- Canarium kinabaluense Leenh. – N Borneo
- Canarium kipella (Blume) Miq. – W Java
- Canarium kostermansii Leenh. – Borneo
- Canarium lamianum Daly, Raharim. & Federman – Madagascar
- Canarium lamii Leenh. – New Guinea
- Canarium latistipulatum Ridl. – Borneo
- Canarium liguliferum Leenh. – Solomon Islands (Rob Roy Island)
- Canarium littorale Blume – Indo-China, Sumatra, Malay Peninsula, Java, Borneo
- Canarium lobocarpum Daly, Raharim. & Federman – Madagascar
- Canarium longistipulatum Daly, Raharim. & Federman – Madagascar
- Canarium luzonicum (Blume) A.Gray – Philippines
- Canarium lyi C.D.Dai & Yakovlev – Vietnam
- Canarium macadamii Leenh. – New Guinea
- Canarium madagascariense Engl. – Madagascar (Nosy Bé)
- Canarium maluense Lauterb. – Sulawesi, Maluku, New Guinea, Borneo
- Canarium manii King – Andaman and Nicobar Islands, Myanmar
- Canarium manongarivum Daly, Raharim. & Federman – Madagascar
- Canarium megacarpum Leenh. – New Guinea
- Canarium megalanthum Merr. – Sumatra, Malay Peninsula, Borneo
- Canarium merrillii H.J.Lam – Borneo
- Canarium muelleri F.M.Bailey – Queensland endemic, Australia
- Canarium multiflorum Engl. – Madagascar
- Canarium multinerve Daly, Raharim. & Federman – Madagascar
- Canarium nitidifolium Daly, Raharim. & Federman – Madagascar
- Canarium obovatum Daly, Raharim. & Federman – Madagascar
- Canarium obtusifolium Scott Elliot – eastern Madagascar
- Canarium odontophyllum Miq. – Sumatra, Borneo, Philippines (Palawan)
- Canarium oleiferum Baill. – New Caledonia endemic
- Canarium oleosum (Lam.) Engl. – New Guinea, New Britain, Timor, Maluku, Sulawesi
- Canarium ovatum Engl. – Philippines, cultivated Asia–Pacific
- Canarium pallidum Daly, Raharim. & Federman – Madagascar
- Canarium paniculatum (Lam.) Benth. ex Engl. – Mauritius
- Canarium parvum Leenh. – S China, Vietnam
- Canarium patentinervium Miq. – Sumatra, Malay Peninsula, Banka, Borneo
- Canarium perlisanum Leenh. – Malay Peninsula (Perlis)
- Canarium pilicarpum Daly, Raharim. & Federman – northern and east-northeastern Madagascar
- Canarium pilososylvestre Leenh. – W New Guinea
- Canarium pilosum A.W.Benn. – Sumatra, Malay Peninsula, Borneo
  - subsp. borneensis Leenh. – Borneo
- Canarium pimela K.D.Koenig Chinese black olive (乌榄) – Vietnam, Cambodia, Laos, S China
- Canarium planifolium Daly, Raharim. & Federman – Madagascar
- Canarium polyphyllum K.Schum. – New Guinea
- Canarium pseudodecumanum Hochr. – Sumatra, Malay Peninsula, Borneo
- Canarium pseudopatentinervium H.J.Lam – S Sumatra, Banka, Borneo
- Canarium pseudopimela Kochummen – Borneo (Sarawak)
- Canarium pseudosumatranum Leenh. – Malay Peninsula
- Canarium pulchrebracteatum Guillaumin – eastern Madagascar
- Canarium reniforme Kochummen & Whitmore – Peninsular Malaysia
- Canarium resiniferum Bruce ex King – Assam and Bangladesh
- Canarium rigidum (Blume) Zipp. ex Miq. – New Guinea
- Canarium rotundifolium Guillaumin – Cambodia and Vietnam
- Canarium salomonense B.L.Burtt – New Guinea and Solomon Islands
- Canarium sarawakanum Kochummen – Borneo (Sarawak)
- Canarium schweinfurthii Engl. – African canarium; from Nigeria and Angola to Uganda
- Canarium sikkimense King – Sikkim
- Canarium strictum Roxb. – India, Burma, S China
- Canarium subsidarium Daly, Raharim. & Federman – Madagascar
- Canarium subtile Daly, Raharim. & Federman – Madagascar
- Canarium subulatum Guillaumin – Thailand, Vietnam, Cambodia, Laos, S China
- Canarium sumatranum Boerl. & Koord. – Sumatra, Malay Peninsula
- Canarium sylvestre Gaertn. – New Guinea, Maluku
- Canarium thorelianum Guillaumin – Cambodia and Vietnam
- Canarium trifoliolatum Engl. – New Caledonia endemic
- Canarium trigonum H.J.Lam – Sulawesi
- Canarium vanikoroense Leenh. – Fiji, Santa Cruz Islands, Vanuatu, and Wallis and Futuna
- Canarium velutinifolium Daly, Raharim. & Federman – Madagascar
- Canarium venosum Craib – Thailand
- Canarium vitiense A.Gray – Fiji, Solomon Is., Samoa, Tonga, New Guinea, Bismarck Arch., Admiralty Is., Louisiade Arch., Torres Strait I's, Qld Australia
- Canarium vittatistipulatum Guillaumin – Vietnam
- Canarium vrieseanum Engl. – Philippines, Sulawesi
- Canarium vulgare Leenh. – Flores, Timor, Sulawesi, Maluku
- Canarium whitei Guillaumin – New Caledonia endemic
- Canarium zeylanicum (Retz.) Blume – Sri Lanka

== Ecology ==
Superb fruit-doves (Ptilinopus superbus) are known to be fond of the fruit of scrub turpentine (C. australianum), which they swallow whole.

Many animals feed on the fruit of C. odontophyllum in the wild, such as the red-bellied lemur (Eulemur rubriventer) and the ruffed lemurs (Varecia) of Madagascar's eastern tropical forests. Canarium fruit is also an important part of the diet of the aye-aye (Daubentonia madagascarensis).

== Uses ==
Several species have edible nuts, known as galip nut or nangae (C. indicum), pili nut (C. ovatum), or simply canarium nut (C. harveyi and C. indicum). C. indicum are among the most important nut-bearing trees in eastern Indonesia and the Southwest Pacific. C. ovatum is cultivated as a food crop only in the Philippines.

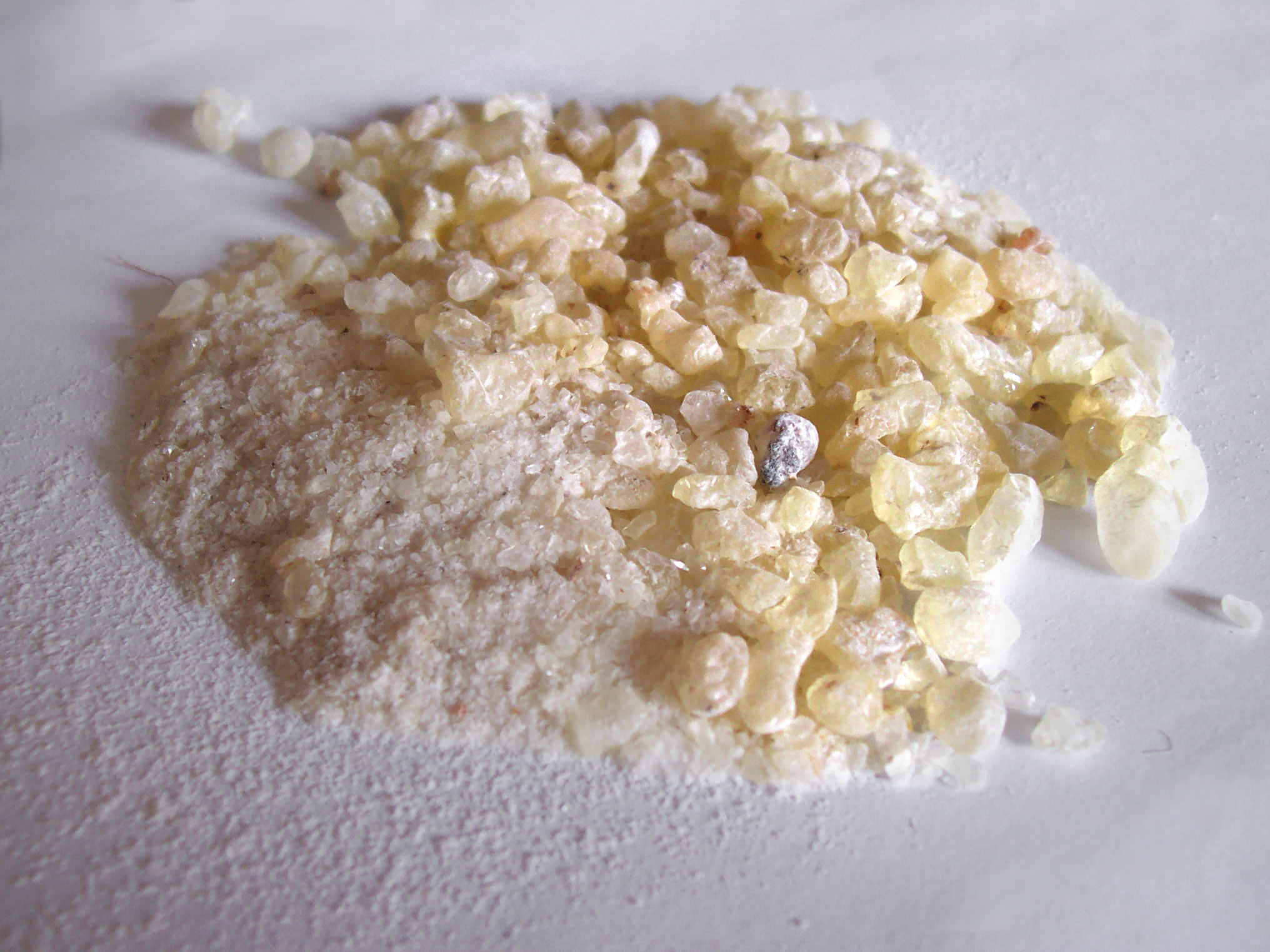
Dammar resin

C. odontophyllum, known commonly as dabai or kembayau, is a species with a nutritious fruit with a creamy taste. It is hard when raw and may be pickled or softened with hot water when prepared.

Canarium album produces a fruit consumed in Vietnam, Thailand (where it is known as nam liap (Thai: หนำเลี้ยบ), samo chin (Thai: สมอจีน) or kana (Thai: กาน้า)) and in China (Chinese: 橄欖) with an appearance of a big olive.

Canarium luzonicum, commonly known as elemi, is a tree native to the Philippines. An oleoresin, which contains elemicin, is harvested from it.

Canarium strictum produces a resin called black dammar.
