= Canarium salomonense =

Scientific classification
- Kingdom: Plantae
- Clade: Tracheophytes
- Clade: Angiosperms
- Clade: Eudicots
- Clade: Rosids
- Order: Sapindales
- Family: Burseraceae
- Genus: Canarium
- Species: C. salomonense

Binomial name
- Canarium salomonense B.L.Burtt (1935)

Subspecies
- Canarium salomonense subsp. papuanum Leenh.; Canarium salomonense subsp. salomonense

Species of flowering plant

Canarium salomonense is a species of flowering plant in family Burseraceae. It is a tree native to New Guinea and the Solomon Islands archipelago, including Bougainville.

It includes two subspecies, Canarium salomonense subsp. papuanum from New Guinea, and Canarium salomonense subsp. salomonense, which is native to the Solomon archipelago.
