= Canarium muelleri =

Scientific classification
- Kingdom: Plantae
- Clade: Tracheophytes
- Clade: Angiosperms
- Clade: Eudicots
- Clade: Rosids
- Order: Sapindales
- Family: Burseraceae
- Genus: Canarium
- Species: C. muelleri

Binomial name
- Canarium muelleri F.M.Bailey

Species of flowering plant

Canarium muelleri, commonly named scrub turpentine or mangobark, is a species of Australian rainforest trees in the plant family Burseraceae. They are endemic to northeastern Queensland, widespread in the rainforests of the Wet Tropics region, and further south to the Conway Range area, near Proserpine, Queensland.

Full grown trees may reach up to 30 m (100 ft) tall. They have pinnate (compound) leaves each composed of 3–9 leaflets, the combined length of the leaflets and the petiole totalling up to 30 cm (12 in). In Dec–Jan they grow fleshy, blue or black ripe fruits, 13–20 mm (0.5–0.8 in) long, eaten by rainforest birds including cassowaries and by fruit bats. Each fruit contains a hard–shelled seed.

These trees formal description using this species name was published in 1890 by Frederick M. Bailey, Queensland colonial botanist from 1881 to 1915.
