= Canarium subulatum =

Scientific classification
- Kingdom: Plantae
- Clade: Tracheophytes
- Clade: Angiosperms
- Clade: Eudicots
- Clade: Rosids
- Clade: Malvids
- Order: Sapindales
- Family: Burseraceae
- Genus: Canarium
- Species: C. subulatum

Binomial name
- Canarium subulatum Guillaumin

Species of tree

Canarium subulatum is a tropical forest tree species in the family Burseraceae. It occurs in southern China and Indo-China; in Vietnam it may be called trám múi nhọn. No subspecies are listed in the Catalogue of Life.
