= Canarium reniforme =

Conservation status
- Conservation Dependent (IUCN 2.3)

Scientific classification
- Kingdom: Plantae
- Clade: Tracheophytes
- Clade: Angiosperms
- Clade: Eudicots
- Clade: Rosids
- Order: Sapindales
- Family: Burseraceae
- Genus: Canarium
- Species: C. reniforme

Binomial name
- Canarium reniforme Kochummen & Whitm.

Species of tree

Canarium reniforme is a species of plant in the Burseraceae family. It is a tree endemic to Peninsular Malaysia. It is threatened by habitat loss.
