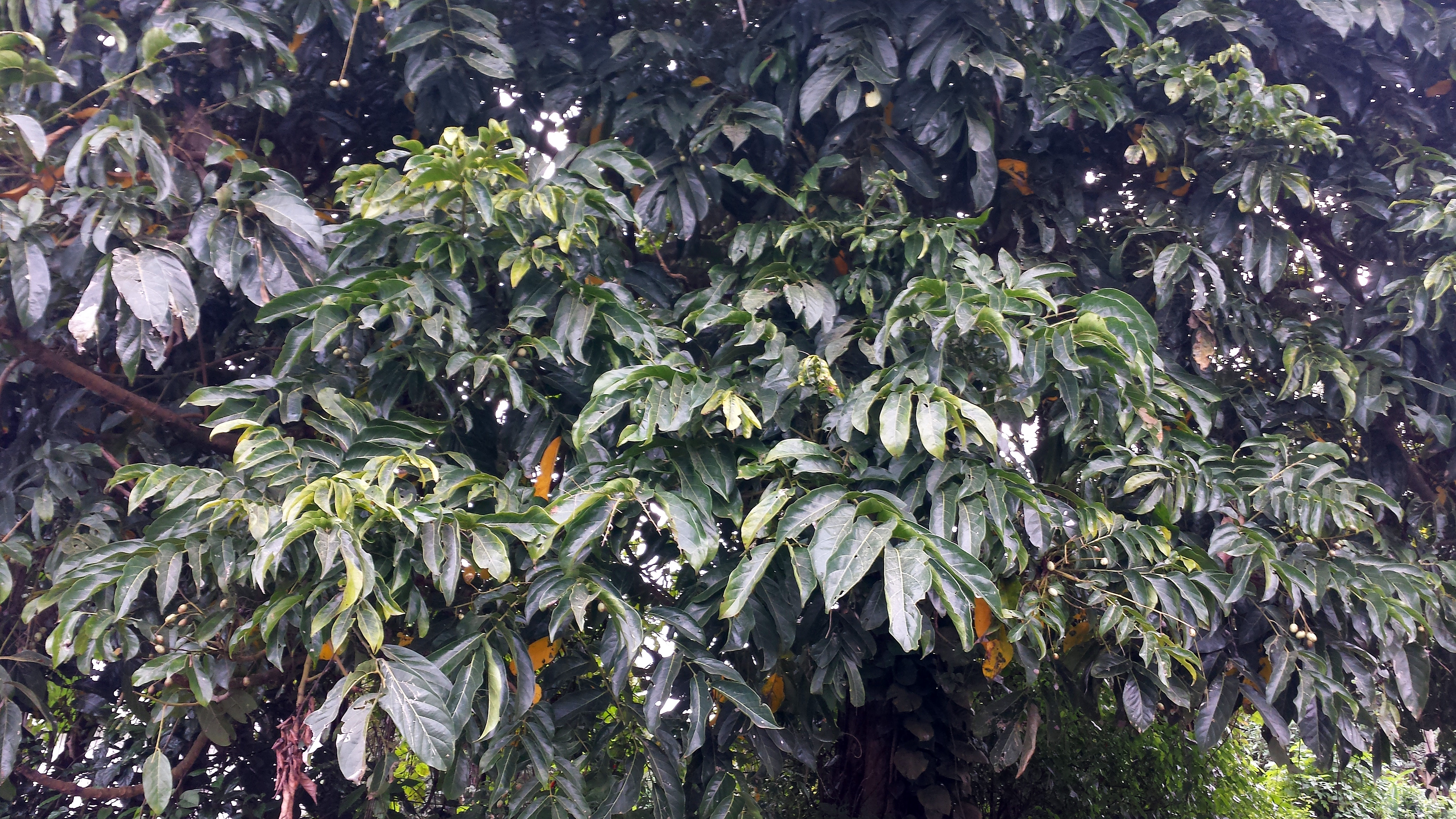
- Leaves of Canarium schweinfurthii

Conservation status
- Least Concern (IUCN 3.1)

Scientific classification
- Kingdom: Plantae
- Clade: Tracheophytes
- Clade: Angiosperms
- Clade: Eudicots
- Clade: Rosids
- Order: Sapindales
- Family: Burseraceae
- Genus: Canarium
- Species: C. schweinfurthii

Binomial name
- Canarium schweinfurthii Engl.

= Canarium schweinfurthii =

African canarium

Species of tree

Canarium schweinfurthii (commonly known as the bush candle, African olive, African elemi, Empafu, or canarium), is a species of large tree native to tropical Africa. Names in many African languages are variations of mupafu.

== Description ==
Because of similarities in their fruit and leaves, African elemi may be confused with Dacryodes edulis.

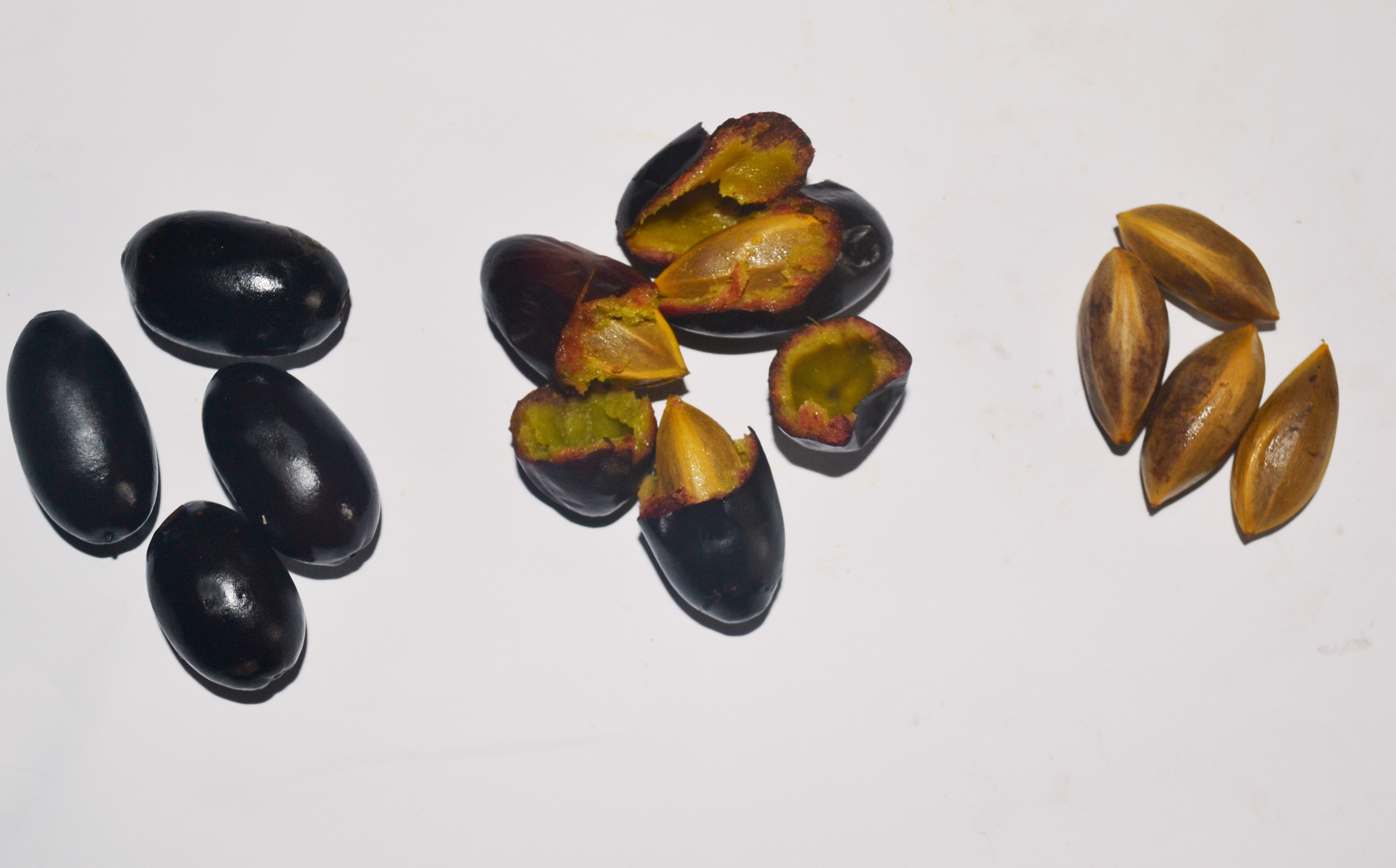
Fruit, pulpe et noyau du Canarium schweinfurthii

== Distribution and habitat ==
African elemi is found from the coast of Nigeria, Angola to Uganda.

== Uses ==
The African elemi tree is one of several sources of the economically useful oleoresin known elemi. In West Africa this resin is traditionally burned for fumigating dwellings and mixed with oil for body paint. African elemi bears edible fruit with a thick, dense, hard shell.

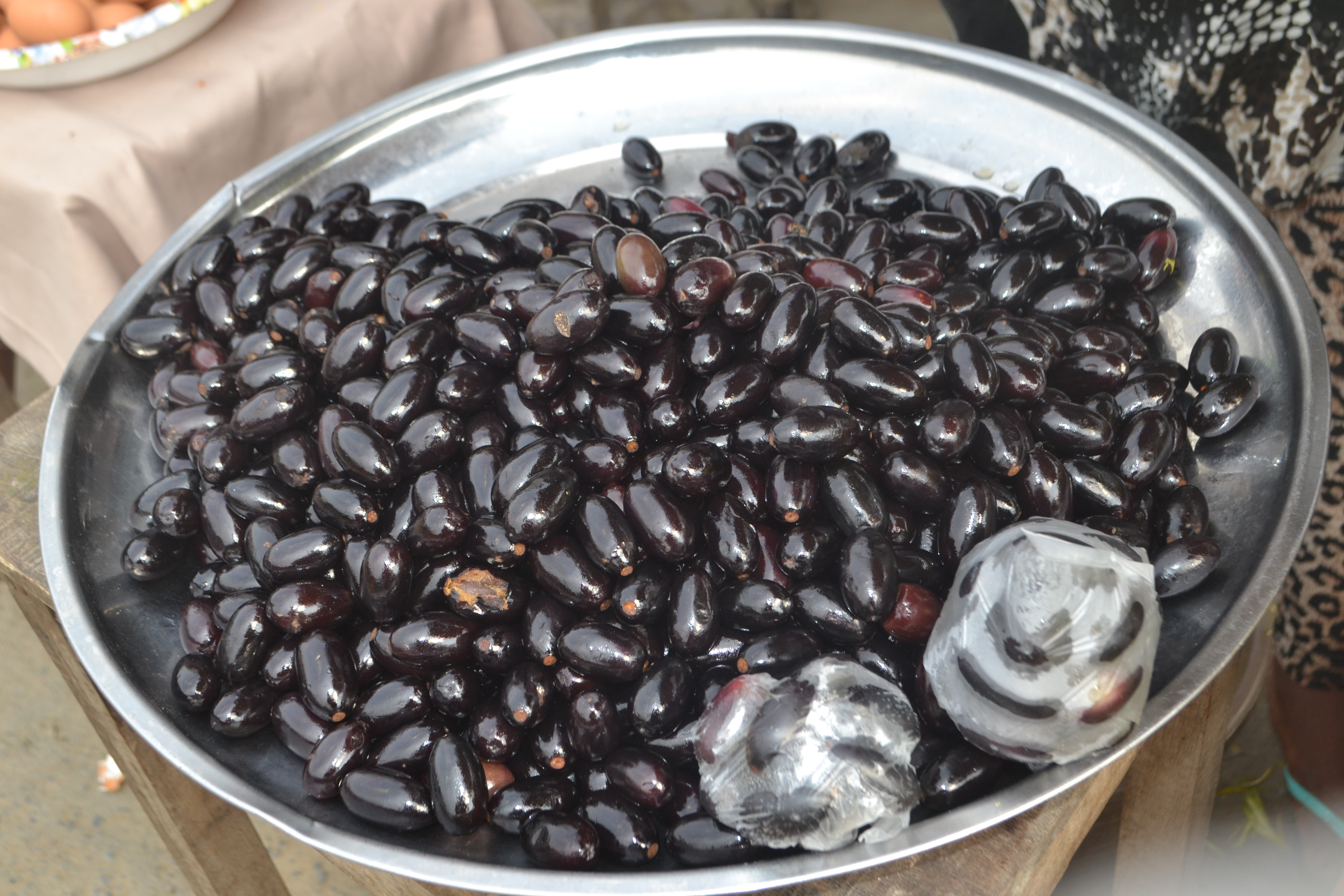
Cooked Canarium schweinfurthii for sale

The hard stones of its fruit are used for traditional divination among Plateau speakers in the Middle Belt of central Nigeria.
