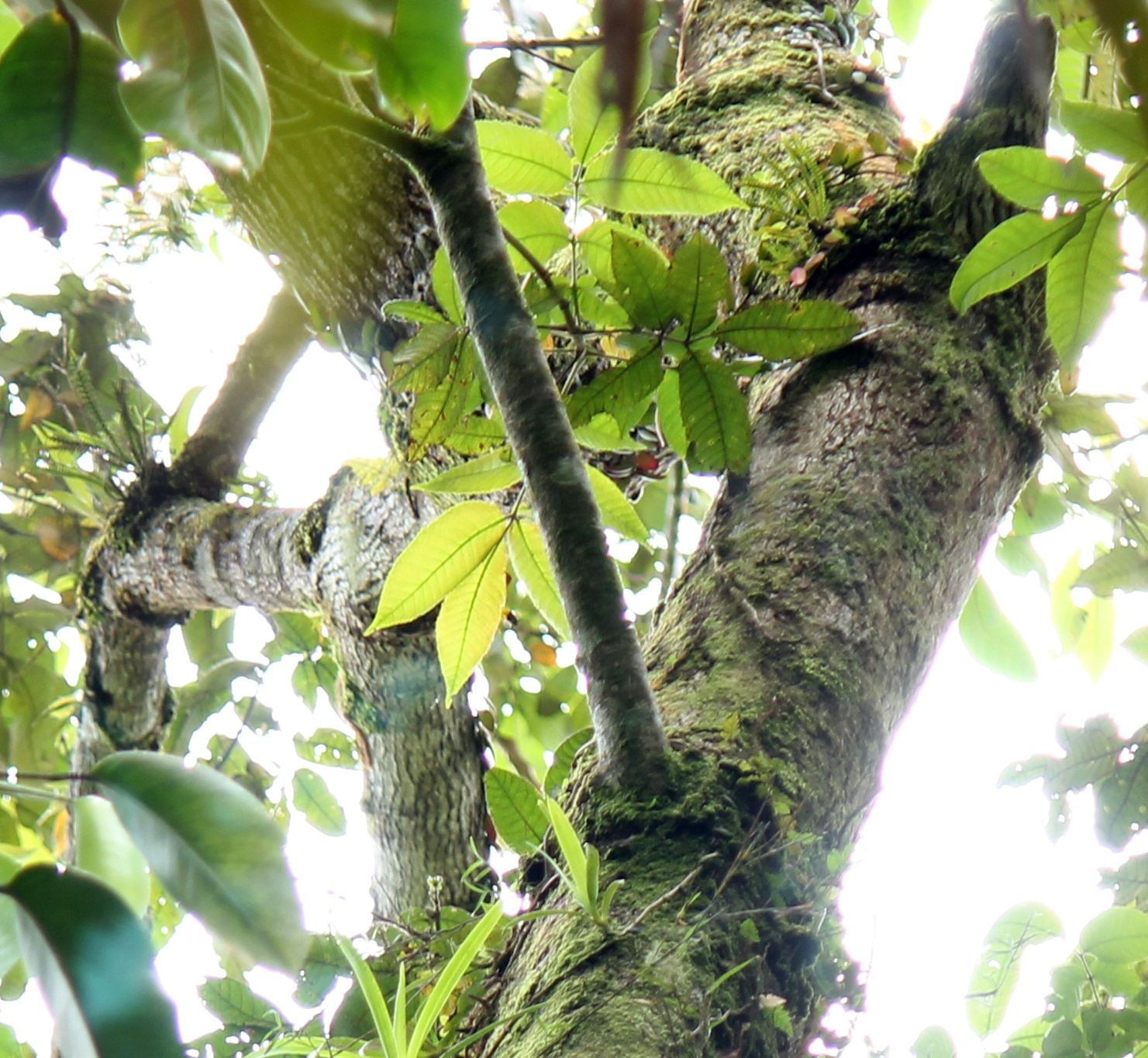

Conservation status
- Least Concern (IUCN 2.3)

Scientific classification
- Kingdom: Plantae
- Clade: Tracheophytes
- Clade: Angiosperms
- Clade: Eudicots
- Clade: Rosids
- Order: Sapindales
- Family: Burseraceae
- Genus: Canarium
- Species: C. asperum

Binomial name
- Canarium asperum Benth.

= Canarium asperum =

Species of tree

Canarium asperum is a species of plant in the family Burseraceae. It is found in Brunei, Indonesia (Java), Malaysia, Papua New Guinea, the Philippines, and the Solomon Islands.
