= Canarium kipella =

Conservation status
- Endangered (IUCN 3.1)

Scientific classification
- Kingdom: Plantae
- Clade: Tracheophytes
- Clade: Angiosperms
- Clade: Eudicots
- Clade: Rosids
- Order: Sapindales
- Family: Burseraceae
- Genus: Canarium
- Species: C. kipella

Binomial name
- Canarium kipella (Blume) Miq.

Synonyms
- Canarium kitengo (Blume) Miq.; Canarium pimela Blume; Pimela kipella Blume (1850) (basionym); Pimela kitengo Blume

Species of flowering plant

Canarium kipella is a species of flowering plant in the Burseraceae family. It is a tree endemic to western Java in Indonesia. It is known only from Mount Salak and near Pelabuhan Ratu, where it grows in hill rain forest. It is an endangered species threatened by habitat loss.
