= Canarium liguliferum =

Conservation status
- Data Deficient (IUCN 2.3)

Scientific classification
- Kingdom: Plantae
- Clade: Tracheophytes
- Clade: Angiosperms
- Clade: Eudicots
- Clade: Rosids
- Order: Sapindales
- Family: Burseraceae
- Genus: Canarium
- Species: C. liguliferum

Binomial name
- Canarium liguliferum Leenh.

Species of flowering plant

Canarium liguliferum is a species of plant in the Burseraceae family. It is endemic to the Solomon Islands.
