= Canarium denticulatum =

Scientific classification
- Kingdom: Plantae
- Clade: Tracheophytes
- Clade: Angiosperms
- Clade: Eudicots
- Clade: Rosids
- Order: Sapindales
- Family: Burseraceae
- Genus: Canarium
- Species: C. denticulatum

Binomial name
- Canarium denticulatum Blume (1826)

Synonyms
- List: Canariopsis denticulata (Blume) Miq. (1859); Canarium coccineobracteatum Kurz (1872); Canarium denticulatum subsp. fissistipulum (Miq.) Leenh. in Blumea 9: 368 (1959); Canarium denticulatum var. latifolia Blume (1850); Canarium fissistipulum Miq. (1859); Canarium fuscum Engl. (1883); Canarium kunstleri King (1893); Canarium laciniatum Elmer (1911); Canarium spectabile Miq. (1869); Pimela denticulata (Blume) Blume (1850)

Species of tree

Canarium denticulatum is a tree in the family Burseraceae. The specific epithet denticulatum is from the Latin meaning 'small teeth', referring to the leaf margin.

== Description ==
Canarium denticulatum grows up to 30 metres (100 ft) tall with a trunk diameter of up to 50 centimetres (20 in). The bark is smooth and grey-white. The flowers are white. The ellipsoid fruits measure up to 3 cm (1 in) long.

== Distribution and habitat ==
Canarium denticulatum grows naturally in the Andaman Islands, Myanmar, Thailand, and western Malesia (Peninsular Malaysia, Sumatra, Java, Borneo, and the Philippines). Its habitat is lowland mixed dipterocarp forest from sea-level to 750 metres (2,500 ft) elevation.

== Subspecies ==
Two subspecies are accepted:

- Canarium denticulatum subsp. denticulatum – Andaman Islands, Myanmar, Thailand, and Western Malesia
- Canarium denticulatum subsp. kostermansii Leenh. – Borneo
