= Canarium divergens =

Scientific classification
- Kingdom: Plantae
- Clade: Tracheophytes
- Clade: Angiosperms
- Clade: Eudicots
- Clade: Rosids
- Order: Sapindales
- Family: Burseraceae
- Genus: Canarium
- Species: C. divergens

Binomial name
- Canarium divergens Engl.

Species of tree

Canarium divergens is a tree in the family Burseraceae. The specific epithet divergens is from the Latin meaning 'diverging', referring to the branching of the inflorescences.

== Description ==
Canarium divergens grows up to 30 metres (100 ft) tall with a trunk diameter of up to 45 centimetres (18 in). The scaly bark is grey-white. The ellipsoid fruits are yellowish-green when fresh and measure up to 8.5 cm (3 in) long.

== Distribution and habitat ==
Canarium divergens is endemic to Borneo. Its habitat is mixed dipterocarp forests from sea-level to 450 metres (1,500 ft) elevation.
