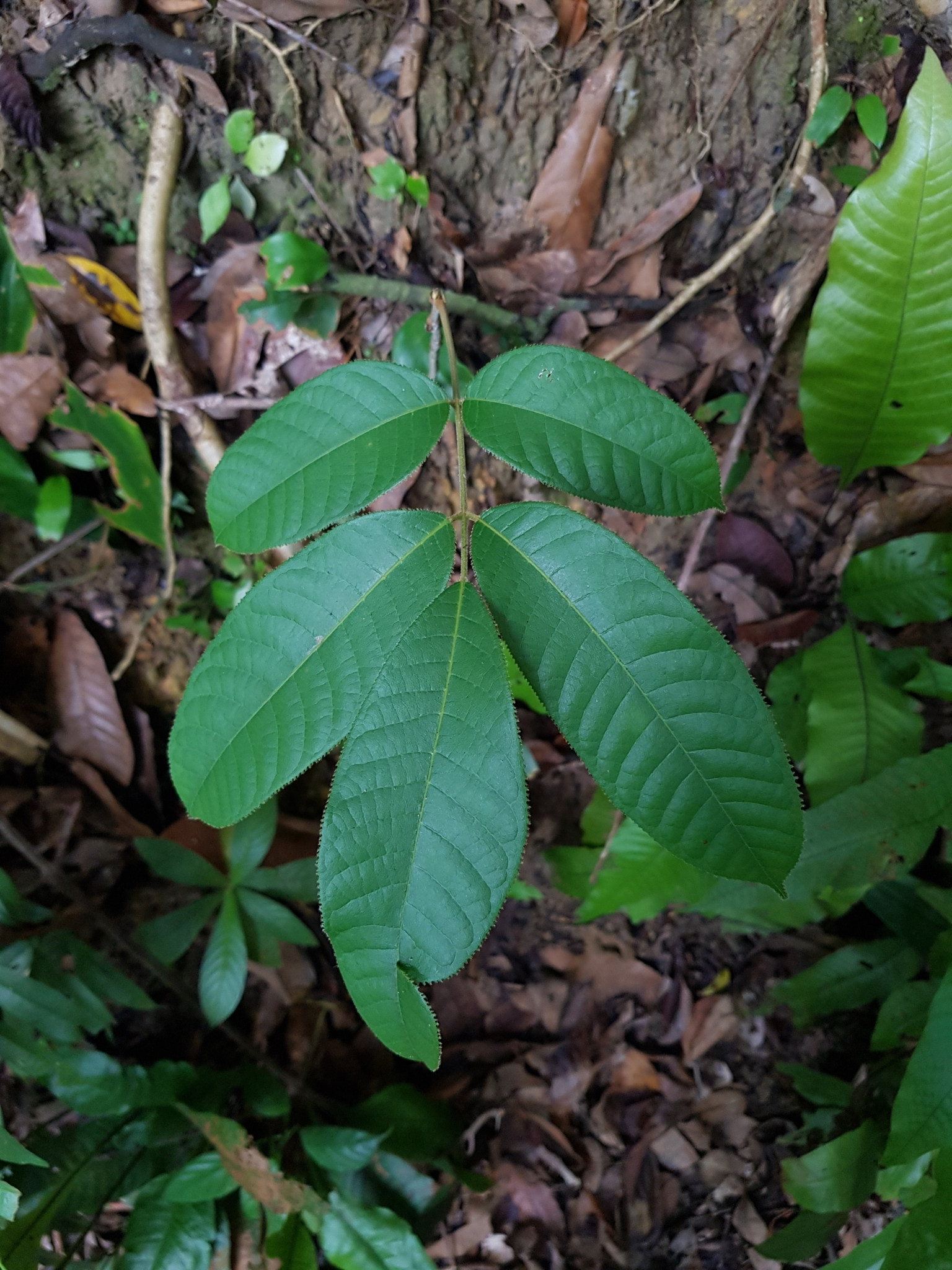
- In Singapore

Scientific classification
- Kingdom: Plantae
- Clade: Tracheophytes
- Clade: Angiosperms
- Clade: Eudicots
- Clade: Rosids
- Order: Sapindales
- Family: Burseraceae
- Genus: Canarium
- Species: C. pilosum

Binomial name
- Canarium pilosum A.W.Benn.

Subspecies
- C. pilosum subsp. borneensis

Synonyms
- Canarium grandiflorum A.W.Benn.; Canarium hirtellum A.W.Benn.; Canarium motleyanum Engl.; Canarium pilosum var. hirtellum Ridl.

= Canarium pilosum =

Species of plant in the family Burseraceae

Canarium pilosum is a tree in the family Burseraceae. The specific epithet pilosum is from the Latin meaning 'hairy', referring to the soft hairs of the twigs and leaves.

== Description ==
Canarium pilosum grows up to 27 metres (90 ft) tall with a trunk diameter of up to 25 centimetres (10 in). The bark is smooth and pale brown. The oblong fruits measure up to 3 cm (1 in) long.

== Distribution and habitat ==
Canarium pilosum grows naturally in Sumatra, Peninsular Malaysia and Borneo. Its habitat is lowland to montane forest.
