= Canarium merrillii =

Conservation status
- Least Concern (IUCN 3.1)

Scientific classification
- Kingdom: Plantae
- Clade: Tracheophytes
- Clade: Angiosperms
- Clade: Eudicots
- Clade: Rosids
- Order: Sapindales
- Family: Burseraceae
- Genus: Canarium
- Species: C. merrillii

Binomial name
- Canarium merrillii H.J.Lam

Synonyms
- Canarium merrillii var. originarium H.J.Lam; Canarium merrillii var. villosum H.J.Lam

Species of tree

Canarium merrillii is a species of tree in the family Burseraceae. It is named for the American botanist Elmer Drew Merrill.

== Description ==
Canarium merrillii grows up to 25 metres (80 ft) tall with a trunk diameter of up to 30 centimetres (12 in). The bark is grey and scaly. The flowers are yellow. The ellipsoid fruits measure up to 4.2 cm (2 in) long.

== Distribution and habitat ==
Canarium merrillii is endemic to Borneo. Its habitat is mixed dipterocarp to submontane forests from sea level to 1,400 metres (4,600 ft) elevation.
