= Canarium grandifolium =

Scientific classification
- Kingdom: Plantae
- Clade: Tracheophytes
- Clade: Angiosperms
- Clade: Eudicots
- Clade: Rosids
- Order: Sapindales
- Family: Burseraceae
- Genus: Canarium
- Species: C. grandifolium

Binomial name
- Canarium grandifolium (Ridl.) H.J.Lam

Species of tree

Canarium grandifolium is a tree in the family Burseraceae. The specific epithet grandifolium is from the Latin meaning 'large leaf'.

== Description ==
Canarium grandifolium grows up to 40 metres (130 ft) tall with a trunk diameter of up to 60 centimetres (24 in). The scaly bark is greyish. The fruits are ellipsoid and measure up to 5 cm (2 in) long.

== Distribution and habitat ==
Canarium grandifolium grows naturally in Peninsular Malaysia and Borneo. Its habitat is lowland mixed dipterocarp forest.
