= Canarium whitei =

Conservation status
- Critically Endangered (IUCN 2.3)

Scientific classification
- Kingdom: Plantae
- Clade: Tracheophytes
- Clade: Angiosperms
- Clade: Eudicots
- Clade: Rosids
- Order: Sapindales
- Family: Burseraceae
- Genus: Canarium
- Species: C. whitei

Binomial name
- Canarium whitei Guillaumin

Species of flowering plant

Canarium whitei is a species of plant in the Burseraceae family. It is endemic to New Caledonia.
