= Canarium apertum =

Conservation status
- Least Concern (IUCN 3.1)

Scientific classification
- Kingdom: Plantae
- Clade: Tracheophytes
- Clade: Angiosperms
- Clade: Eudicots
- Clade: Rosids
- Order: Sapindales
- Family: Burseraceae
- Genus: Canarium
- Species: C. apertum

Binomial name
- Canarium apertum H.J.Lam

Synonyms
- Santiria serrulata Engl.

Species of tree

Canarium apertum is a species of tree in the family Burseraceae. The specific epithet apertum means 'open', referring to the basal openings between petals.

== Description ==
Canarium apertum grows up to 40 metres (130 ft) tall with a trunk diameter of up to 80 centimetres (31 in). The scaly bark is grey-brown. The flowers are yellow-brown. The fruits are ovoid and measure up to 5 cm (2 in) long.

== Distribution and habitat ==
Canarium apertum grows naturally in Sumatra, Peninsular Malaysia and Borneo. Its habitat is lowland mixed dipterocarp forest from sea-level to 500 metres (1,600 ft) altitude.
