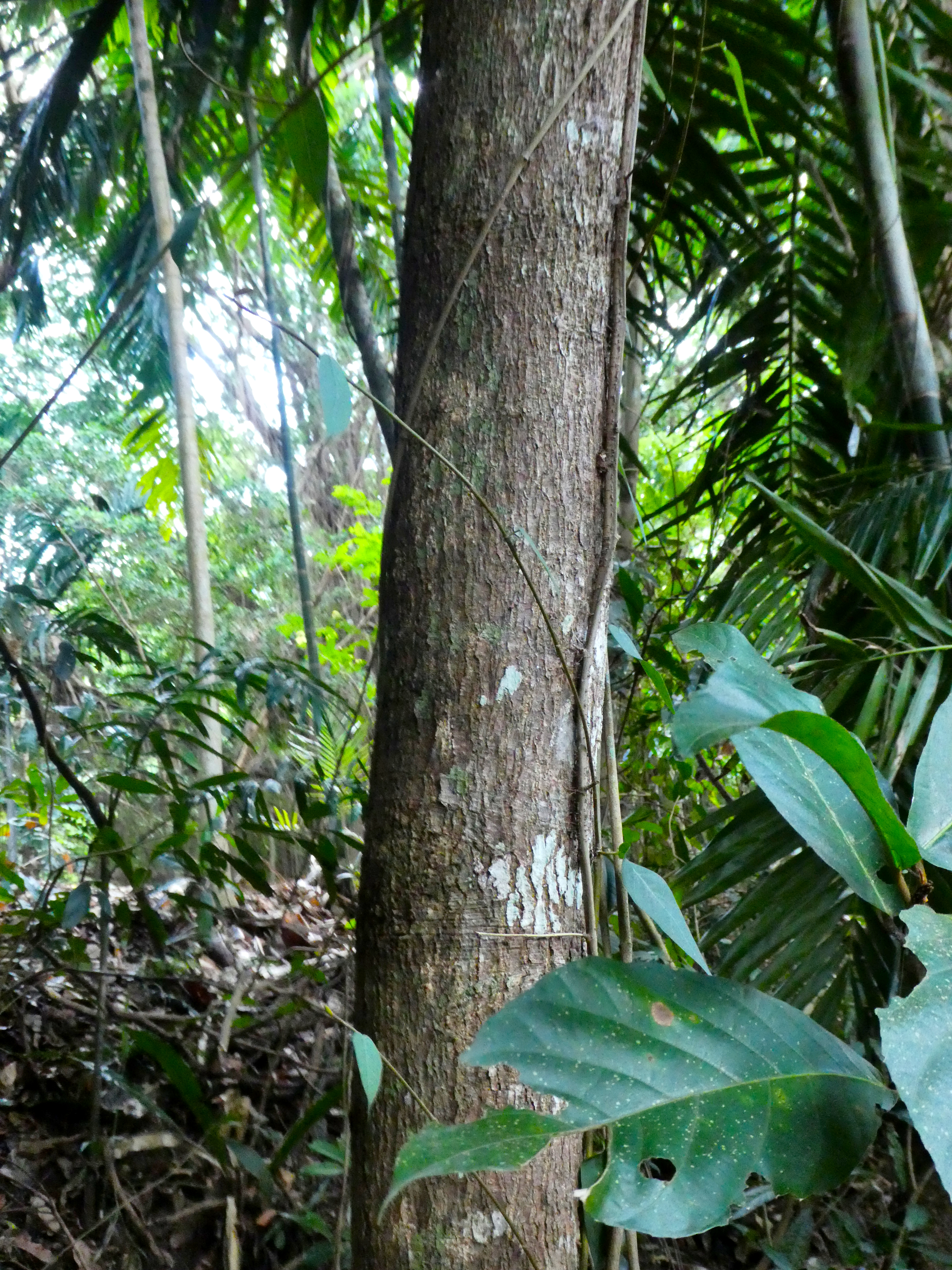
- In Queensland

Conservation status
- Least Concern (IUCN 3.1)

Scientific classification
- Kingdom: Plantae
- Clade: Embryophytes
- Clade: Tracheophytes
- Clade: Angiosperms
- Clade: Eudicots
- Clade: Rosids
- Order: Sapindales
- Family: Burseraceae
- Genus: Canarium
- Species: C. vitiense

Binomial name
- Canarium vitiense A.Gray

Synonyms
- Canarium schlechteri Lauterb.

= Canarium vitiense =

Species of tree

Canarium vitiense is a rainforest tree species, of the plant family Burseraceae, growing naturally in Fiji, the Solomon Islands, Samoa, Tonga, New Guinea, Bismarck Archipelago, Admiralty Islands, Louisiade Archipelago, Torres Strait Islands and in lowland north-eastern Queensland, Australia.

In New Guinea, they are recorded as growing widely in rainforests up about 250 m (820 ft) altitude.

In the Torres Strait Islands (Australia), likewise they are recorded as growing up about 250 m (820 ft) altitude.

In the Australian mainland north-eastern Queensland regions of the Wet Tropics, Cape York Peninsula and just to their east the continent's offshore islands, they are recorded as growing naturally widespread, from about Ingham–Hinchinbrook Island northwards, in remaining well developed lowland tropical rainforests, below ca. 100 m (330 ft) altitude.

Full grown trees may reach up to 30–40 m (100–130 ft) tall.

Formal description of some trees found in Fiji, using this species name, was published in 1854 by botanist Asa Gray, effectively describing this species of all of these trees across the western Pacific region.
