= Canarium latistipulatum =

Scientific classification
- Kingdom: Plantae
- Clade: Tracheophytes
- Clade: Angiosperms
- Clade: Eudicots
- Clade: Rosids
- Order: Sapindales
- Family: Burseraceae
- Genus: Canarium
- Species: C. latistipulatum

Binomial name
- Canarium latistipulatum Ridl.

Species of tree

Canarium latistipulatum is a tree in the family Burseraceae. The specific epithet latistipulatum means 'wide stipule'.

== Description ==
Canarium latistipulatum grows up to 27 metres (90 ft) tall. The powdery-brown fruits are oblong and measure up to 7.2 cm (3 in) long.

== Subspecies ==
Two subspecies of Canarium latistipulatum are recognised:

- Canarium latistipulatum subsp. latistipulatum
- Canarium latistipulatum subsp. mitus P.S.Ashton – Brunei

== Distribution and habitat ==
Canarium latistipulatum is endemic to Borneo. Its habitat is lowland rain forests.
