= Canarium megalanthum =

Scientific classification
- Kingdom: Plantae
- Clade: Tracheophytes
- Clade: Angiosperms
- Clade: Eudicots
- Clade: Rosids
- Order: Sapindales
- Family: Burseraceae
- Genus: Canarium
- Species: C. megalanthum

Binomial name
- Canarium megalanthum Merr.

Species of tree

Canarium megalanthum is a tree in the family Burseraceae. The specific epithet megalanthum is from the Greek meaning 'large flower'.

== Description ==
Canarium megalanthum grows up to 35 metres (110 ft) tall with a trunk diameter of up to 50 centimetres (20 in). The grey bark is smooth to scaly. The ellipsoid fruits measure up to 7.5 cm (3 in) long.

== Distribution and habitat ==
Canarium megalanthum grows naturally in Sumatra, Peninsular Malaysia and Borneo. Its habitat is mixed dipterocarp forest from sea-level to 360 metres (1,200 ft) altitude.
