= Canarium kostermansii =

Scientific classification
- Kingdom: Plantae
- Clade: Tracheophytes
- Clade: Angiosperms
- Clade: Eudicots
- Clade: Rosids
- Order: Sapindales
- Family: Burseraceae
- Genus: Canarium
- Species: C. kostermansii

Binomial name
- Canarium kostermansii Leenh.

Species of tree

Canarium kostermansii is a tree in the family Burseraceae. It is named for the Indonesian botanist André Kostermans.

== Description ==
Canarium kostermansii grows up to 35 metres (110 ft) tall with a trunk diameter of up to 60 centimetres (24 in). The bark is brown and smooth. The spindle-shaped fruits measure up to 3 cm (1 in) long.

== Distribution and habitat ==
Canarium kostermansii is endemic to Borneo. Its habitat is lowland and hill forests from sea-level to 900 metres (3,000 ft) elevation.
