= Canarium luzonicum =

Conservation status
- Near Threatened (IUCN 3.1)

Scientific classification
- Kingdom: Plantae
- Clade: Tracheophytes
- Clade: Angiosperms
- Clade: Eudicots
- Clade: Rosids
- Order: Sapindales
- Family: Burseraceae
- Genus: Canarium
- Species: C. luzonicum

Binomial name
- Canarium luzonicum (Blume) A.Gray

Species of tree

Canarium luzonicum, commonly known as elemi, is a tree native to the Philippines. The oleoresin harvested from it is also known as elemi resin.

== Synonyms ==
- Canarium carapifolium G.Perkins
- Canarium oliganthum Merr.
- Canarium polyanthum G.Perkins
- Canarium triandrum Engl.
- Pimela luzonica Blume

== Description ==
Canarium luzonicum is a large evergreen tree growing to a maximum height of about 30 m (100 ft). The leaves are alternate and are pinnate. Clusters of flowers, which are pollinated by insects, are followed by thick-shelled nuts with edible kernels.

== Uses ==
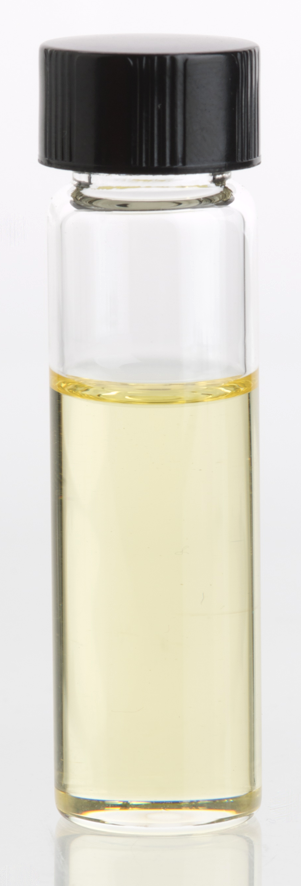
Elemi (Canarium luzonicum) essential oil in clear glass vial

Elemicin is named after Canarium luzonicum, one of the vernacular names of which is elemi.

Elemi resin is a pale yellow substance, of honey-like consistency. Aromatic elemi oil is steam distilled from the resin. It is a fragrant resin with a sharp pine and lemon-like scent. One of the resin components is called amyrin.

Elemi resin is chiefly used commercially in varnishes and lacquers, and certain printing inks. It is used as a herbal medicine to treat bronchitis, catarrh, extreme coughing, mature skin, scars, stress, and wounds. The constituents include phellandrene, limonene, elemol, elemicin, terpineol, carvone, and terpinolene. In high doses, elemicin can cause irritation, so its concentration in cosmetics does not exceed 1%.

The seed kernels are used for food, both raw and cooked. An edible oil can be extracted from the seeds, and the pulp can be stewed but is somewhat insipid. The young shoots can be boiled and eaten as a vegetable.

== History of the name ==
The word elemi has been used at various times to denote different resins. In the 17th and 18th centuries, the term usually denoted a resin from trees of the genus Icica in Brazil, and before that it meant the resin derived from Boswellia frereana. The word, like the older term animi, appears to have been derived from enhaemon (ἔναιμον): the name of a styptic medicine said by Pliny to contain tears exuded by the olive tree of Arabia.

== See also ==
- Pili nut
- PiHKAL § Essential amphetamines
