= Canarium patentinervium =

Conservation status
- Least Concern (IUCN 2.3)

Scientific classification
- Kingdom: Plantae
- Clade: Tracheophytes
- Clade: Angiosperms
- Clade: Eudicots
- Clade: Rosids
- Order: Sapindales
- Family: Burseraceae
- Genus: Canarium
- Species: C. patentinervium

Binomial name
- Canarium patentinervium Miq.

Synonyms
- Canarium nitidum A.W.Benn.; Canarium parvifolium A.W.Benn.; Canarium subrepandum Miq.

Species of tree

Canarium patentinervium is a tree of tropical Asia in the incense tree family Burseraceae. The specific epithet patentinervium is from the Latin meaning "spreading nerves", referring to the leaf veins.

== Description ==
Canarium patentinervium grows as an understory tree up to 24 metres (80 ft) tall with a trunk diameter of up to 25 cm (10 in). Its smooth bark is coloured grey. The twigs are brownish. The ellipsoid fruits measure up to 6.5 cm (3 in) long.

== Distribution and habitat ==
Canarium patentinervium grows naturally in Sumatra, Peninsular Malaysia and Borneo. Its habitat is dipterocarp and kerangas forests from sea-level to 450 metres (1,500 ft) altitude.
