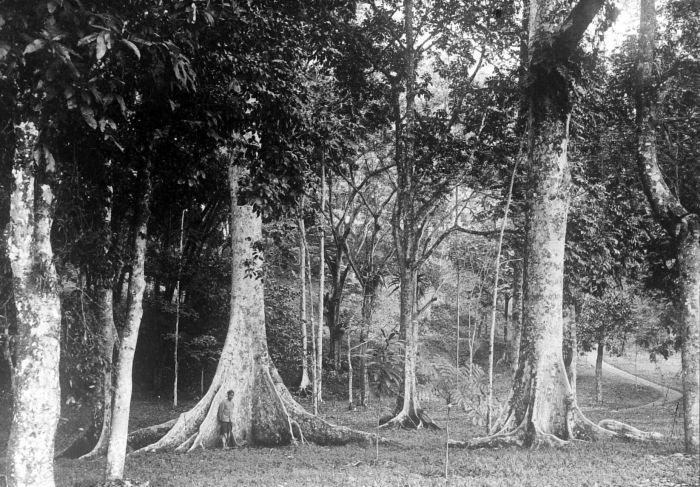

Scientific classification
- Kingdom: Plantae
- Clade: Tracheophytes
- Clade: Angiosperms
- Clade: Eudicots
- Clade: Rosids
- Order: Sapindales
- Family: Burseraceae
- Genus: Canarium
- Species: C. decumanum

Binomial name
- Canarium decumanum Gaertn.

Synonyms
- Canariopsis decumana Miq.

= Canarium decumanum =

Species of tree

Canarium decumanum is a tree in the family Burseraceae. The specific epithet decumanum is from the Latin meaning 'greatest', referring to the size of the tree and the fruit.

== Description ==
Canarium decumanum grows up to 54 metres (180 ft) tall with a trunk diameter of up to 150 centimetres (60 in). The grey bark is smooth to scaly. The flowers are yellow-brown. The fruits are ellipsoid and measure up to 8.5 cm (3 in) long.

== Distribution and habitat ==
Canarium decumanum grows naturally in Borneo, the Moluccas and New Guinea. Its habitat is lowland forests.
