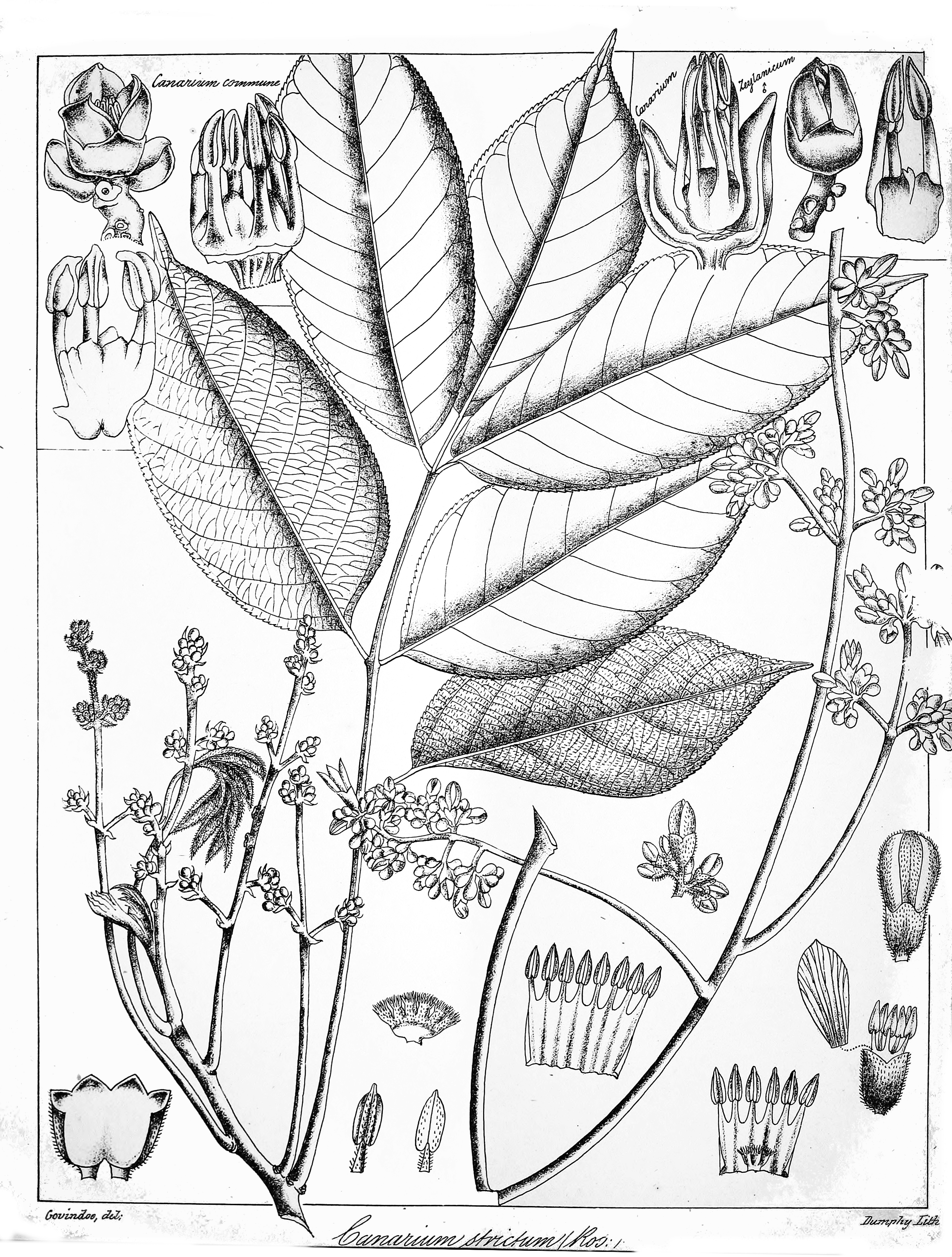

Scientific classification
- Kingdom: Plantae
- Clade: Tracheophytes
- Clade: Angiosperms
- Clade: Eudicots
- Clade: Rosids
- Order: Sapindales
- Family: Burseraceae
- Genus: Canarium
- Species: C. strictum

Binomial name
- Canarium strictum Roxb.

= Canarium strictum =

Species of flowering plant

Canarium strictum, known by common names including black dhup, Raal, Raal dhup and black dammar, is a species of tree in the family Burseraceae (the incense tree family). It is known for the medicinal and commercial use of the resin it exudates, called black dammar.

== Habit and habitat ==
It is found in moist deciduous to semi-evergreen forests. It grows up to 40 meters (130 ft) tall at altitudes in the range of 750–1,400 meters (2,460–4,590 ft). The leaves of this large canopy tree are bipinnate.

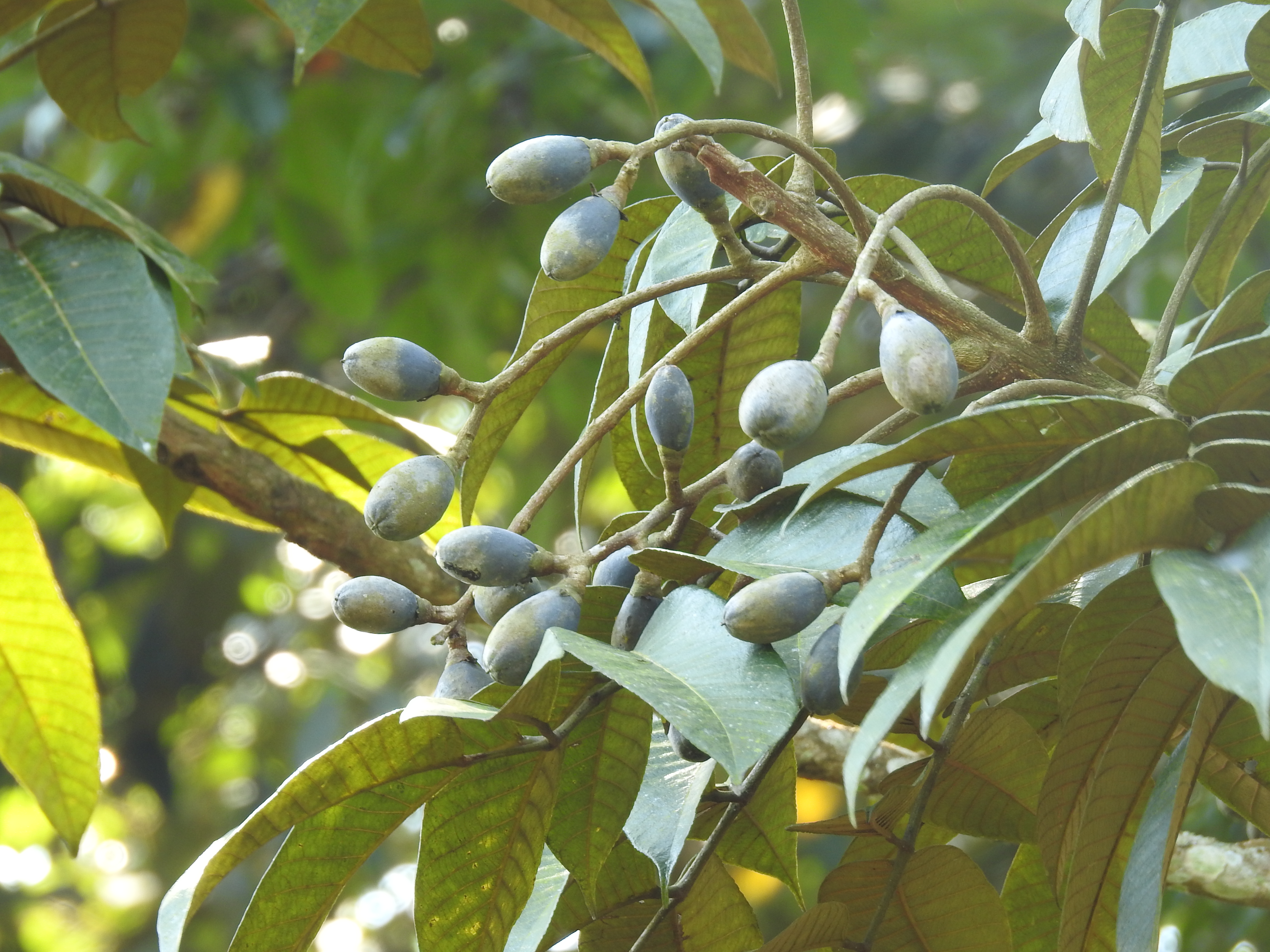
fruits

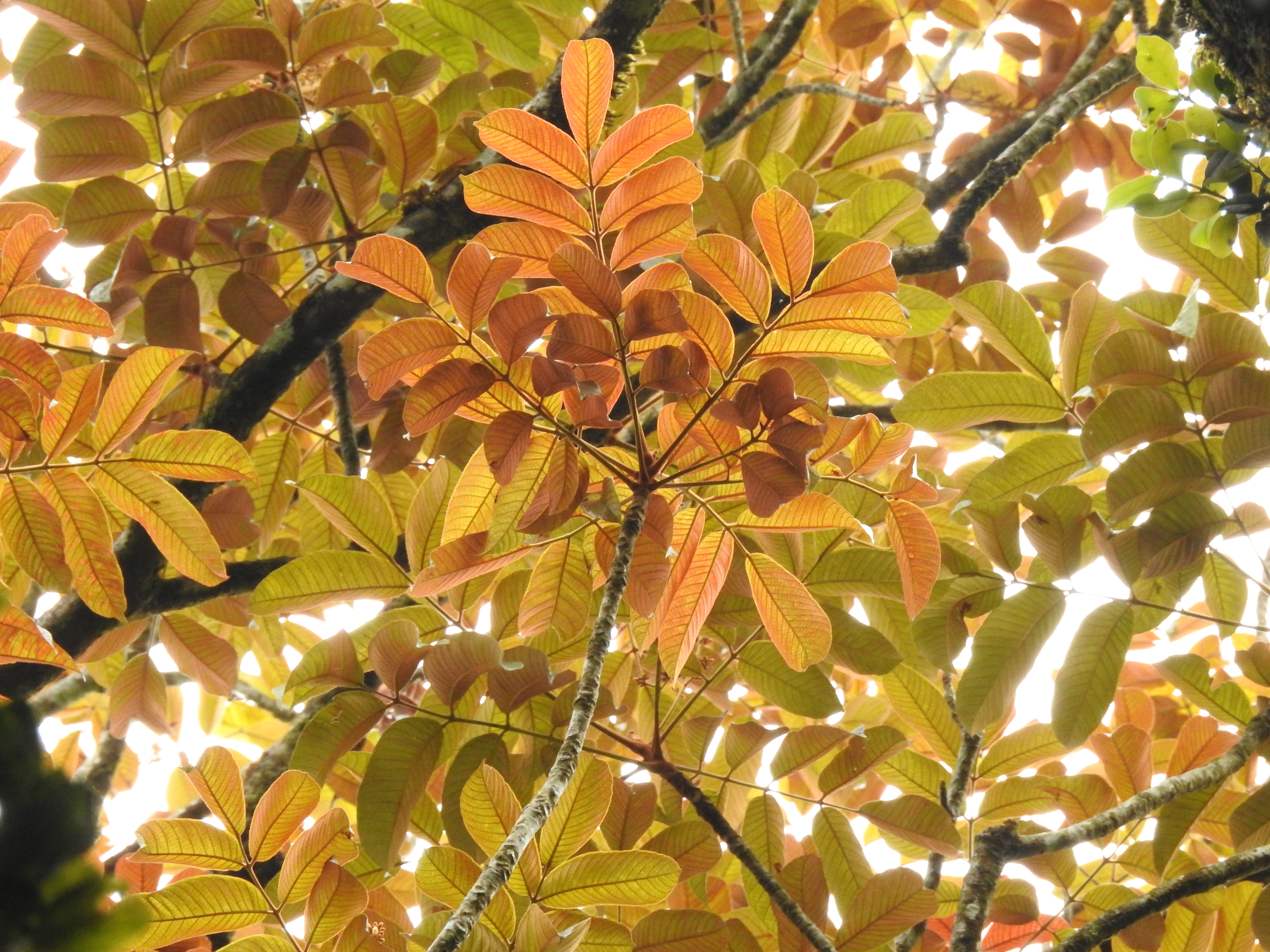
leaf flush

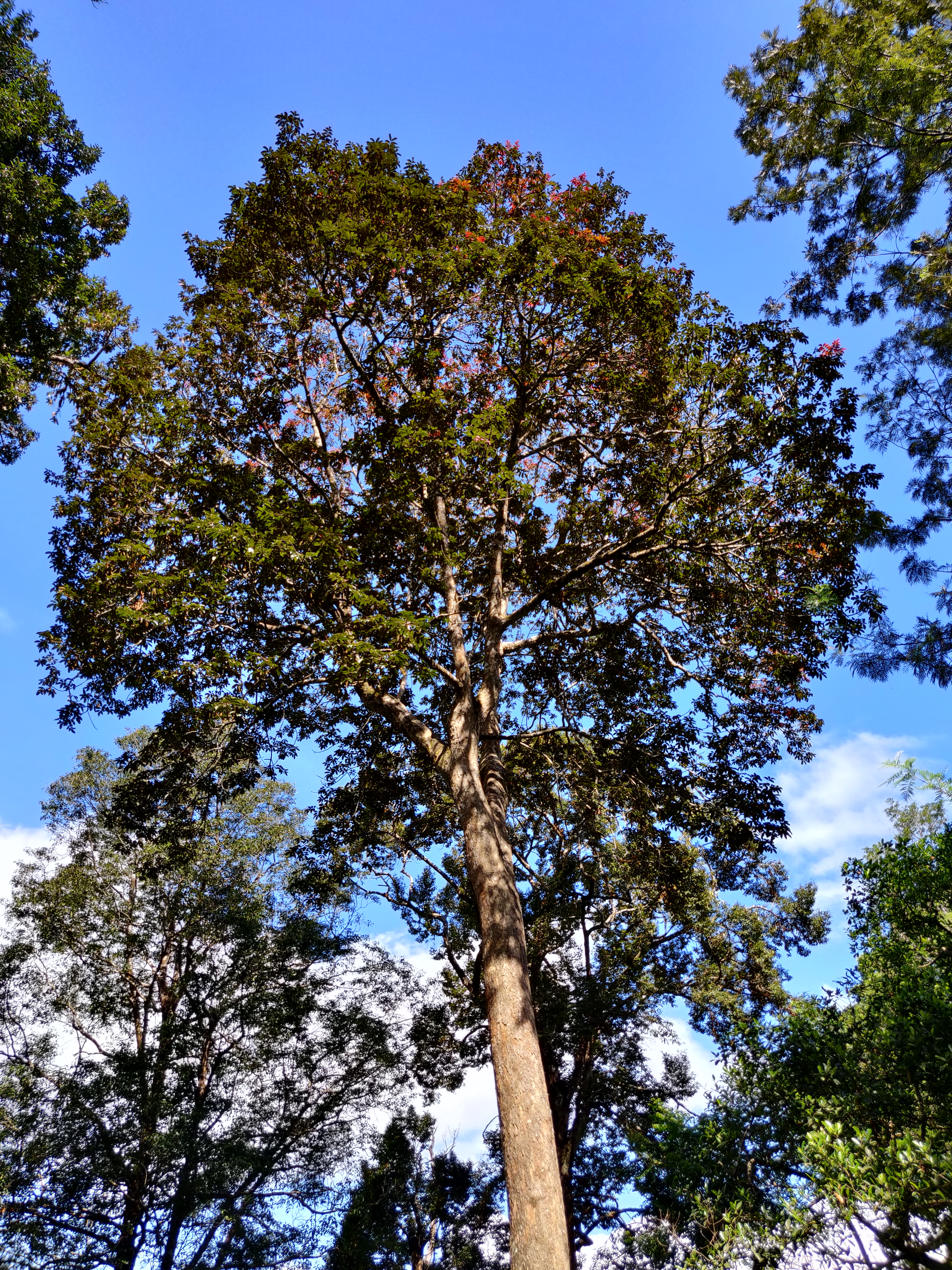
tree

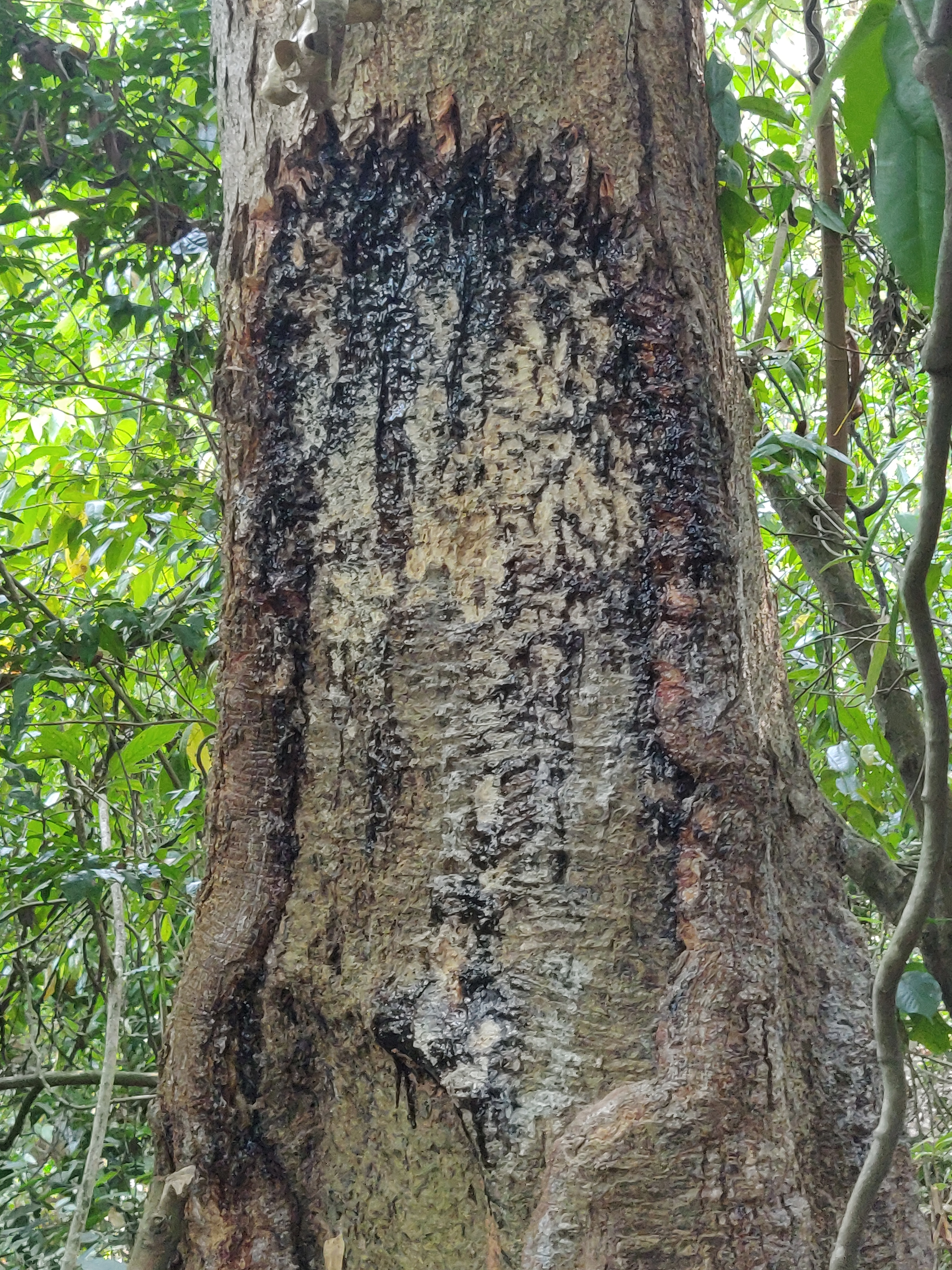
resin harvesting

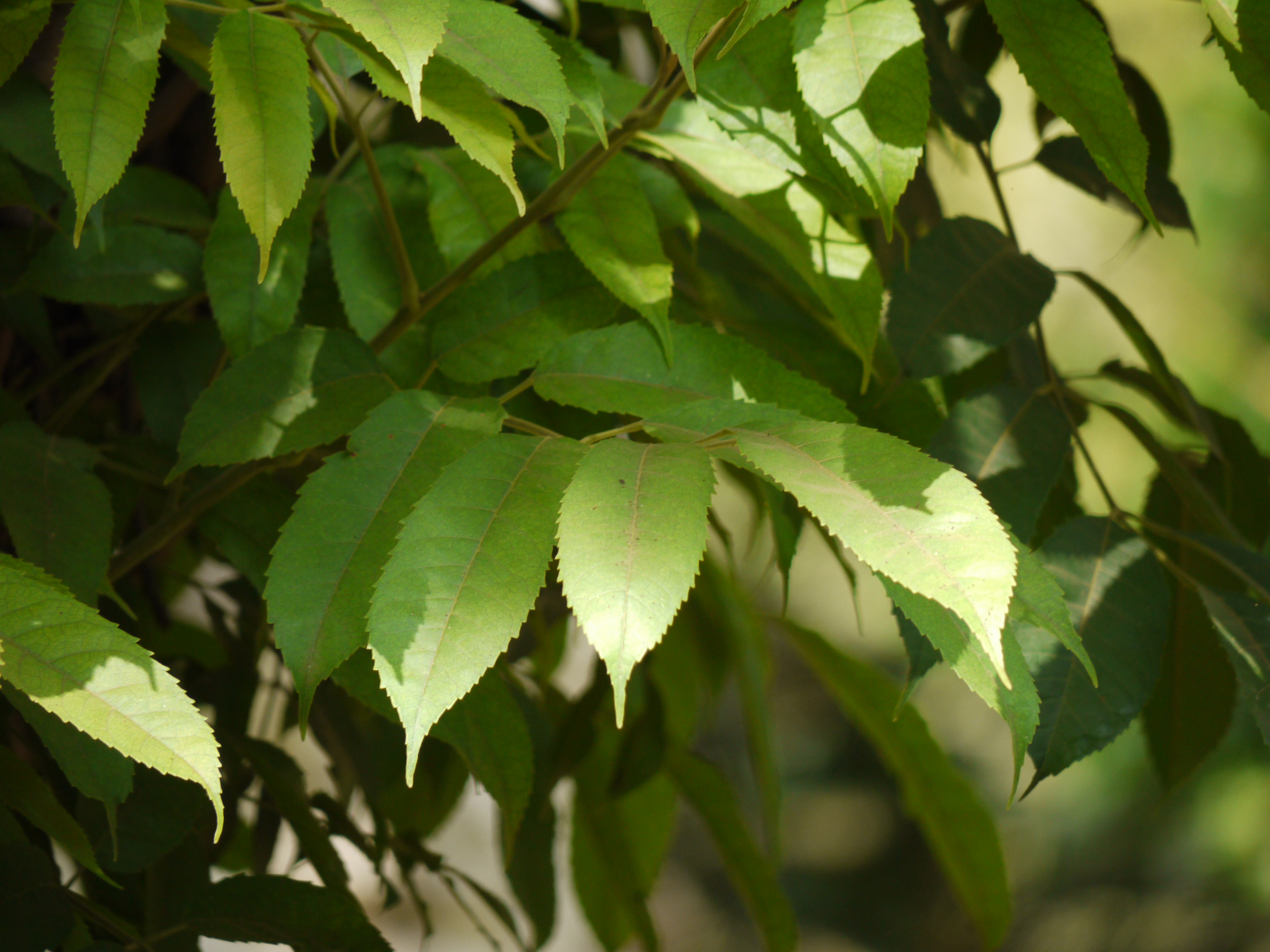
sapling

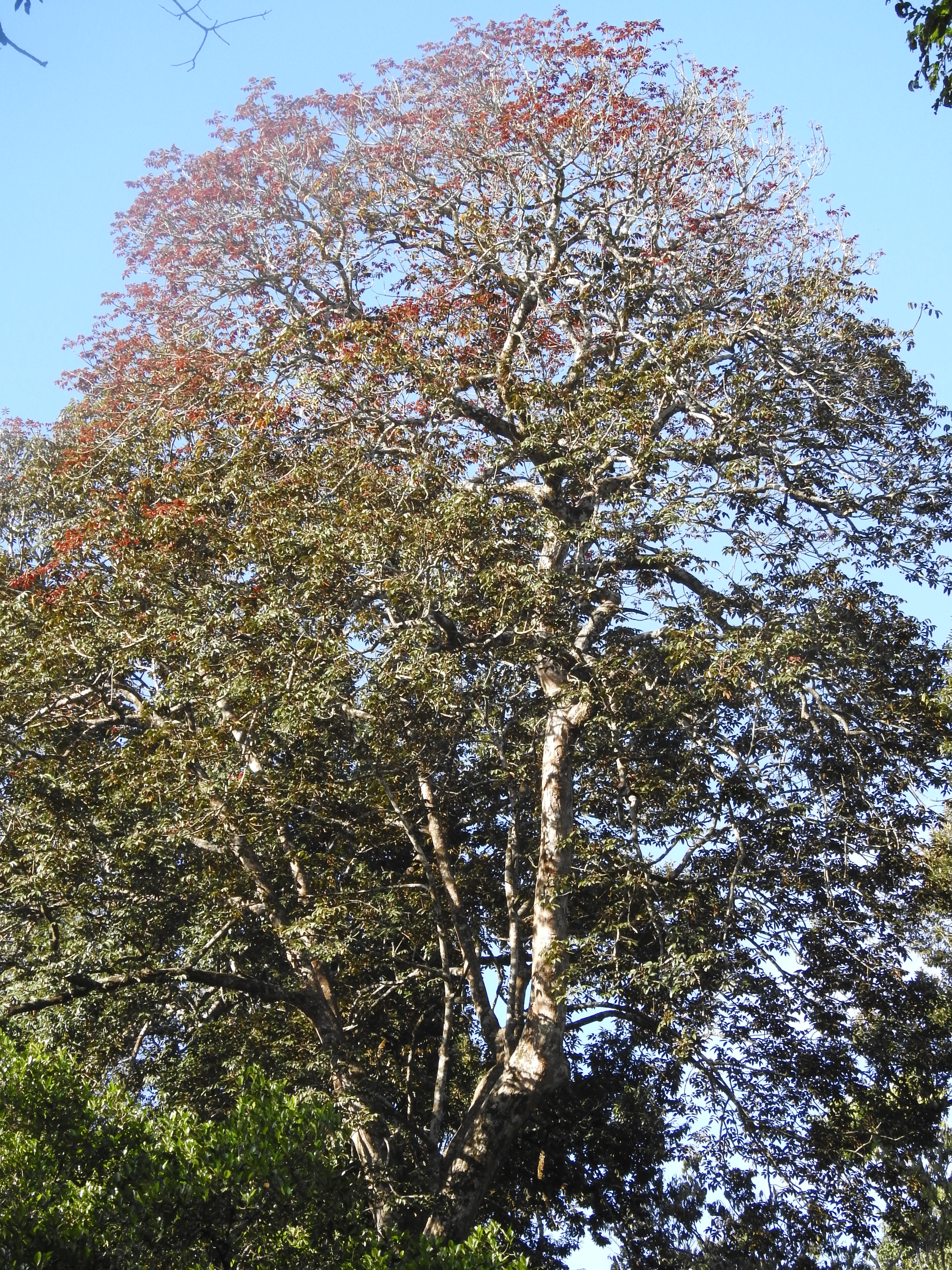
flowering
