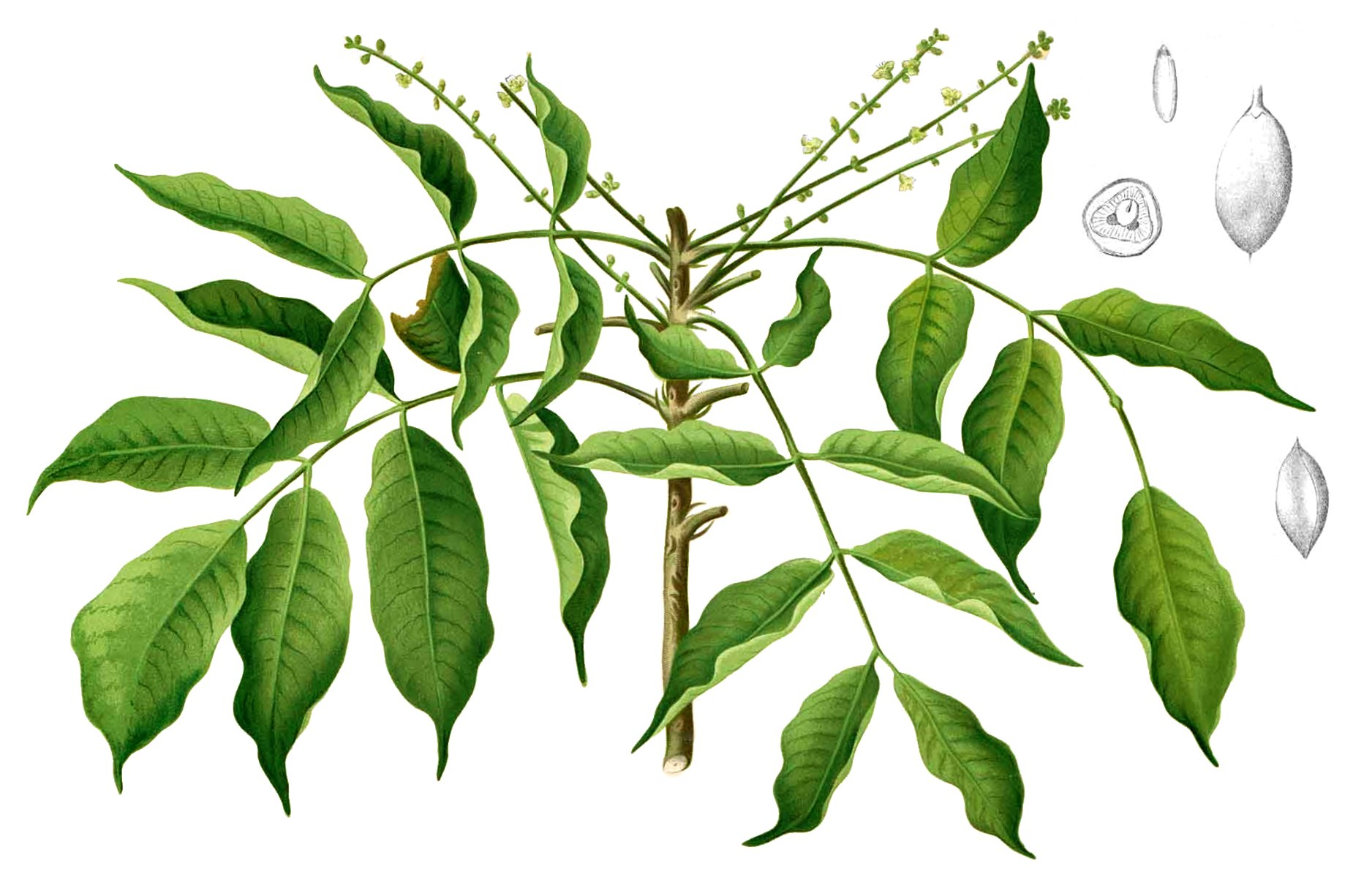
- Canarium pimela: Plate from Flora de Filipinas (as C. tramdenum)

Conservation status
- Least Concern (IUCN 3.1)

Scientific classification
- Kingdom: Plantae
- Clade: Tracheophytes
- Clade: Angiosperms
- Clade: Eudicots
- Clade: Rosids
- Order: Sapindales
- Family: Burseraceae
- Genus: Canarium
- Species: C. pimela

Binomial name
- Canarium pimela K.D.Koenig

Synonyms
- Canarium nigrum (Lour.) Engl.; Canarium pimeloides Govaerts; Canarium tramdenum C.D.Dai & Yakovlev; Lipara nigra (Lour.) Lour. ex Gomes Mach.; Pimela nigra Lour.; Pimela caryophyllacea Blume

= Canarium pimela =

Species of tree

Canarium pimela, also called Chinese black olive (Chinese: 乌榄), is a species of tree in the family Burseraceae. It is found in Indo-China; in Vietnam it is called trám đen or cà na. In Thai, it's called 'Nam Liab (หนำเลี้ยบ)'. The Catalogue of Life does not record any sub-species. Once boiled in salt water the fruit are edible, resembling the flavor of salted plums, and are used in Chinese cuisine as a seasoning.
