= Edmund Sturge =

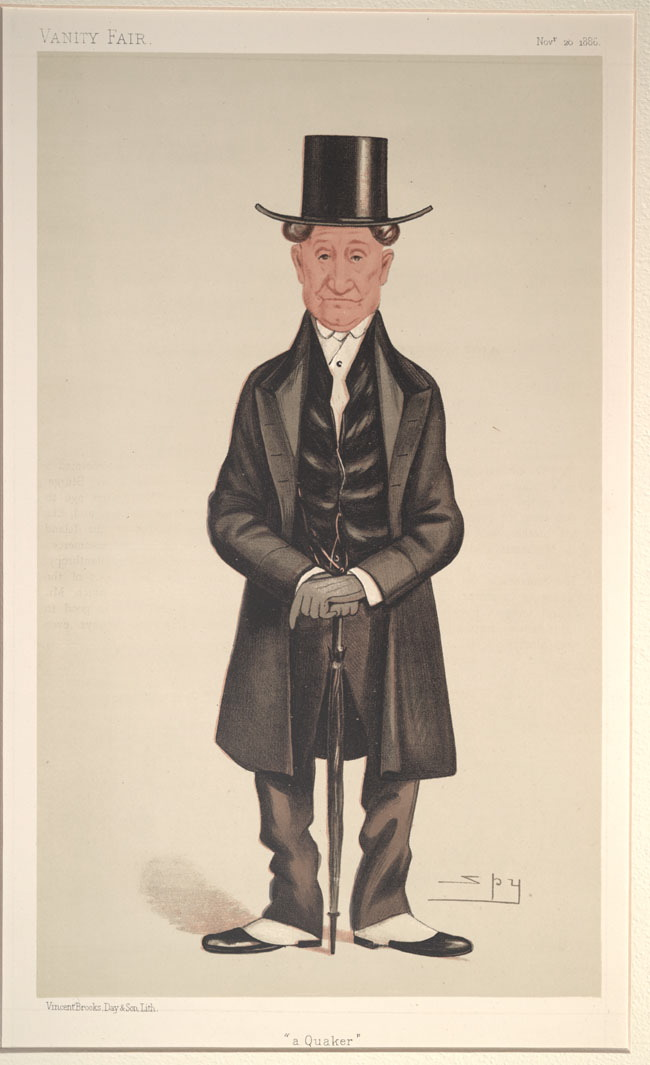
"A Quaker" Sturge as caricatured by Spy (Leslie Ward) in Vanity Fair, November 1886

Edmund Sturge (8 December 1808 – 28 June 1893), was a Quaker businessman and campaigner for liberal causes.

== Early life ==
Edmund Sturge was born at Olveston, near Bristol, the youngest of the twelve children of Joseph Sturge (1752–1817) and his wife, Mary (born Marshall).

His older brother, Joseph Sturge (1793–1859), was active in the anti-slavery movement as was his cousin, Thomas Sturge. Edmund was schooled at James Moxham's (Thornbury) and R. Weston's (Rochester). Both his parents having died by the time he was aged 11, and most holidays were spent with his brother Joseph at Netherton (Bewdley) where he was occupied in the office and warehouse of the corn factors business of Joseph & Charles Sturge. On leaving school he went to live at brother Joseph's new home in Birmingham, where his brother John also resided, and Edmund kept the books of John's Chemical Works until coming of age and entering partnership as J & E Sturge.

Sturge became active in the anti-slavery movement and other liberal causes: for peace, penal reform, the suppression of the opium trade and in the Aborigines' Protection Society.

== Anti-Slavery ==
From 1837, on Joseph Sturge's return from a tour of the West Indies, Edmund helped to widely distribute Joseph's report on the conditions of slaves. In 1840, he joined the newly formed British and Foreign Anti-Slavery Society and in 1860 was appointed to its committee. He served as the Society's Secretary from 1870 and as its chairman from 1882 to 1891 and then as its vice-president until his death. After he retired from business in 1876, he regularly lobbied Parliament on the Society's business (see below: William Tallack's reminiscence).

In 1893, he published a 23-page pamphlet West India : "compensation" to the owners of slaves : its history and its results.

Edmund Sturge's Obituary in The Times said: "...Mr Sturge ... was a younger brother of the late Mr Joseph Sturge, the Abolitionist, and had himself been a steady but unobtrusive worker in the anti-slavery cause for more than 60 years, and many of the reforms that have taken place in the West Indies in favour of the emancipated negros are mainly due to his intervention".

In 1841, Edmund Sturge and Lydia Albright were married (See below for details of their marriage and children). Lydia was already active in liberal causes, such as the replacement of war with arbitration and the relief of poverty. She was already in the Ladies' Negro's Friendly Society and was later its Secretary. It is clear that throughout their marriage her support in their projects was substantial.

== Chemical manufacturing business ==
Another of Edmund Sturge's brothers was John Sturge, (1799–1840). In 1814, he was apprenticed at John Bell, a highly successful Quaker pharmacist and manufacturing chemist, with a shop and laboratory on Oxford Street in London.

John Sturge started his own business, at Severnside, manufacturing verdigris and Solution of Tin for the use of dyers. Around 1823, he moved to Edgbaston, Birmingham and bought land between the canal and Wheeleys Road.

His brother Edmund joined him in the business, after completing his schooling. The firm traded under the name J. and E. Sturge & Co.

In 1831 John leased land across the road on which the John and E. Sturge works were later built and the manufacture of industrial chemicals. Citrates, tartrates, bicarbonate of potash and precipitated chalk were among its products.

On the death of John Sturge in 1840, Arthur Albright, brother to Edmund's wife and a trained chemist, joined the partnership. Arthur Albright was responsible for developing practical mass-production of white phosphorus and later the safer allotrope, "red" or "amorphous" phosphorus, used in the manufacture of matches. He later separated this part of the business, which became Albright and Wilson.

== The Montserrat connection ==
The factory extracted citric acid from citrus juice, using lemons from Sicily, subject to sharp variations in supply. Their brother, Joseph had supported the production of limes on the Caribbean island of Montserrat. This eventually led to the family becoming the largest landholder on Montserrat, successfully running estates with fairly paid labour for many years.

In 1867, Edmund and Lydia Sturge travelled to Montserrat and spent a year developing the growing of limes. This enterprise later became the Montserrat Lime Juice company, of which Edmund Sturge was a director until his death. Their son John Edmund and daughter Edith were also involved in the running of the Montserrat estates.

== Marriage and family ==
In 1841, Edmund Sturge and Lydia Albright were married. She was a daughter of William and Rachel Albright of Charlbury. Their children were:

- John Edmund, born 3 April 1842, married Jane Richardson. Died Montserrat in 1880, aged 38
- Edith Mary, born 26 October 1843 married James Spencer Hollings, 1868.
- Francis Albright, born 28 August 1845
- Eleanor, born 6 August 1848
- Margaret, born 20 August 1850, married (1) Lewis Sturge, (2) Colin Campbell Scott Moncrieff

Lydia Sturge died 19 December 1892.

== Death ==
Edmund Sturge died on 28 June 1893, aged 84 at Charlbury.

== William Tallack's reminiscence ==
William Tallack, prison reformer, wrote:

Mr Edmund Sturge was for many years an active and highly esteemed member of the Howard Committee, and practically fulfilled the functions of its honorary secretary. He had previously resided in Birmingham, but afterwards divided his time between London and Charlbury, in Oxfordshire.

He was a brother of Mr Joseph Sturge, a man of similarly philanthropic energy, who, like himself, devoted much time and labour to the service of the Anti-Slavery cause.

Edmund Sturge resembled George Washington both in features and dignified aspect. He was part proprietor of estates in the island of Montserrat in the West Indies, and was therefore specially conversant with questions relating to the condition of negroes and coolies. For many years he was a constant visitor to the lobbies of the House of Commons, to interest members of the legislature in the several objects of philanthropic effort which were so dear to himself.

He wore a wig, for he had lost all his hair in a brief illness. A few days later some of his friends were assembling for a committee meeting of which he was a member, and presently one of them exclaimed, " Edmund Sturge has not come yet. I never knew him unpunctual before." " I am here," responded a quiet voice, and on turning round, his colleagues could hardly recognise their old friend in his suddenly altered appearance.

He had a strong objection to wearing an overcoat, even in winter, and used to walk with a noiseless tread, as if his shoes had felted soles.

He was not a man of many words, but had a dry humour and occasionally indulged in anecdotes. One of these related to a member of a well-known Quaker family whose eccentricities obliged his friends to put him under restraint at times in an asylum. But he managed to escape more than once, and afterwards remarked that he had thus come to appreciate a common Quaker counsel, to "proceed as way may open." On another occasion the same Friend, on re-entering an asylum at York, requested a private interview with the superintendent, which being granted, and the two sitting for a little while in silence, the new inmate suddenly exclaimed that he had been thinking of the precept, " Whatsoever thy hand findeth to do, do it with thy might," and forthwith he struck the superintendent violently.

Mr Sturge was the subject of one of the cartoons in Vanity Fair (November 20, 1886). In the accompanying letterpress the journalist remarked of him : "No kindlier, simpler, gentler, more upright and honourable a soul ever informed a human body than that which is enveloped in the Quaker outside of Mr Sturge. He is a good, honest creature."

At Charlbury, Mr Sturge used to take his friends into the glades of the adjacent Wychwood Forest and into Cornbury Park, which contains some of the finest beech-trees in England. Mrs Sturge was as devoted to the interests of humanity, and especially to the Anti-Slavery cause, as her husband. They lived long enough to celebrate their golden wedding.

On that occasion the Committee of the Howard Association presented them with an illuminated address of congratulation. In it they recorded : " The Committee gladly avail themselves of this opportunity of conveying to their esteemed friend and colleague, Mr Edmund Sturge, the expression of their profound sense of the value, to this Association and to other kindred bodies, of his services, and of his sound judgment and long experience.

At an Anti-Slavery meeting at the Mansion House, London, Mr Sturge's labours in the cause of humanity received public recognition from the Prince of Wales and several eminent statesmen. He died in 1893, aged eighty-four, and was buried at Charlbury. He was a man of a truly noble character.

== See also ==
- Slavery Abolition Act 1833
- Food & Drink in Birmingham – Limes

== Sources ==
- The main source of vital dates in this article is an entry in the "Dictionary of Quaker Biography" (DQB), a typescript source, held at the Library of the Religious Society of Friends in London. Sources cited in the DQB article on Edmund Sturge are:
  - Birth: Glos. & Wilts. QM Births Digest Register
  - Marriage: Digest of Marriages
  - Death: Digest of Death
  - Children: Digest of Births
  - Testimony of Witney Monthly Meeting in Yearly Meeting Proceedings, 1894, p137
  - Annual Monitor [described below]
  - The Friend 33 (1893):437-8

NOTE: The DQB article on Edmund Sturge makes no reference to his business interests.

- Annual monitor (New Series) 52 (1894): 155–168, a memorial essay, in an annual listing of Quakers who died during the previous year.
- Edward H. Milligan The Biographical Dictionary of British Quakers in Commerce and Industry 1775-1920; York, William Sessions Limited (2007), Paperback ISBN 1-85072-367-2 Hardcover ISBN 978-1-85072-367-7. This dictionary contains no article on Edmund Sturge but useful articles on his brothers, Joseph and Charles Sturge and Edmund's brother-in-law and business partner, Arthur Albright.
- The Montserrat Connection: Family history, by Joseph Edward Sturge (2004), available online. this is an unreferenced family history by someone who managed the Lime plantations on Montserrat 1960 – 1974. It is written for family members.
