= Dacryodes costata =

Conservation status
- Least Concern (IUCN 2.3)

Scientific classification
- Kingdom: Plantae
- Clade: Tracheophytes
- Clade: Angiosperms
- Clade: Eudicots
- Clade: Rosids
- Order: Sapindales
- Family: Burseraceae
- Genus: Dacryodes
- Species: D. costata

Binomial name
- Dacryodes costata (A.W.Benn.) H.J.Lam

Synonyms
- Canarium costatum (Benn.) Ridl.

Species of plant in the family Burseraceae

Dacryodes costata is a tree in the family Burseraceae. The specific epithet costata is from the Latin meaning 'ribbed', likely referring to the prominent veins on the leaf underside.

== Description ==
Dacryodes costata grows up to 45 metres (150 ft) tall with a trunk diameter of up to 45 centimetres (18 in). The grey-brown bark is smooth to flaky. The flowers are white. The fruits are ellipsoid or ovoid and measure up to 2.2 cm (1 in) long.

== Distribution and habitat ==
Dacryodes costata grows naturally in Sumatra, Peninsular Malaysia, Singapore, Borneo and the Philippines. Its habitat is lowland and hill forests from sea-level to 540 metres (1,800 ft) altitude.
