= Food and drink in Birmingham =

As with any large town or city, food and drink has played an important role in the commerce and culture of Birmingham, West Midlands, England.

== Local dishes ==
In the late 18th century, poor harvests in England resulted in high food prices and the opening of soup kitchens to provide cheap, nourishing food for the poor. In 1793, the inventor and industrialist Matthew Boulton noted a recipe in one of his notebooks for a soup that was intended to be sold for a penny a quart. The food was a hearty broth of stewed beef and vegetables, served with a slice of bread. In 2014, Glynn Purnell recreated the dish as a fine-dining course and served it at his restaurant, "Purnell's". The original one consisted of beef, vegetables, and a slice of bread.

A dish titled "Brummie bacon cakes" is also said to be a dish local to Birmingham – It consists of a mixture of flour, salt, and butter or margarine, with chopped bacon and cheese added to it. With the addition of Worcestershire sauce, ketchup, and milk, the mixture is made into a dough and sliced into wedges, which are then baked with cheese sprinkled over them.

Dishes that identify with the neighbouring Black Country are also traditionally popular in Birmingham. This includes faggots and peas and, in the past, groaty pudding made with beef, leeks, onions, and oat groats.

The dish, which originated in Kashmiri restaurants in Birmingham in the 1970s – the Balti – should also be considered as a local dish (see below).

== Tea ==
During the 1830s, Thomas Ridgway began trading in the Bull Ring, selling tea. Ridgway later went bankrupt. Setting up business in London, he paid back all of his creditors and 1897 tea trade, becoming one of the first English tea companies to hygienically pre-pack tea so as to avoid adulteration. In 1876, Queen Victoria commanded House of Ridgways to create a blend for her own personal use. In 1863, William Sumner (founder of Typhoo) published "A Popular Treatise on Tea". In 1870, Sumner started a pharmacy and grocery business in High Street in Birmingham city centre. This grew and forced Sumner to move to new premises on Castle Street and then on to Bordesley Street at the canalside. Typhoo was bought by Indian conglomerate company Apeejay Surrendra Group on 31 October 2005.

== Limes ==
Birmingham's earliest food trade connections with the West Indies involved the importation of limes and cocoa during the mid-to-late 19th century.

The Montserrat Co. Ltd. was formed in Edgbaston by J.& E. Sturge. Lime juice was produced in the city and then exported for use in the manufacture of citric acid. The failure of Sicily's lemon crop at that time resulted in an opening in the market, which Sturge took great advantage of, utilizing their extensive chemical works based in Edgbaston. The company was set up by the Sturge and Albright families, who funded the development of Montserrat estates in 1867. Joseph Sturge bought the Elberton Sugar Estate in 1857 and converted it into a lime production plant. He also wanted to prove that free labour could be made profitable. Members of the Sturge family were instrumental in the British anti-slavery movement.

== Brands ==
Famous food brands that originated in Birmingham include Typhoo tea, Bird's Custard, Bournville cocoa, Cadbury chocolate, and HP Sauce.

== Restaurants ==
The Old Crown public house, a black and white timber-framed building, is said to be the oldest secular building in Birmingham, dating back to 1450 to 1500. It is situated in Deritend and is documented as serving as an inn from 1626. Birmingham Corporation proposed its demolition in 1851, 1856 and 1862 but it was saved by the efforts of Joshua Toulman Smith. It is still used as a public house which serves food. The Saracen's Head in Kings Norton dates from the same period as The Old Crown and is now a visitor's centre with a snack bar. The work to restore The Saracen's Head came as a result of it being chosen for financial assistance by a vote of the viewers of the BBC television programme Restoration in 2004.

The Leicester Arms, which became known as Freeth's Coffee House, situated at the corner of Bell Street and Lease Lane, served as a tavern and coffee house from 1736 to 1832. It served as a meeting place for small businessmen and lawyers and, when bought by John Freeth, a topical ballad writer, in the second half of the 18th century, it became a place for groups which supported radical politics, including the Birmingham Book Club, which held dinners at the coffee house. Freeth sent out rhyming invitations to dinner to club members. The club was recorded as having 24 members in 1775.

Ann Allday, the wife of Joseph Allday who was a leading Birmingham councillor from 1849 to 1859, ran a "celebrated" tripe restaurant and tripe shop in Union Street and other councillors often met there. At that time the Woodman Tavern in Easy Row was also a favoured meeting place for Allday and his colleagues.

A more recent hostelry of note is The Garrison in Dale End, which served as a model for the public house by that name featured in the BBC television drama series Peaky Blinders. The real public house was sold at auction for £183,000 in May 2014.

A fish restaurant was opened in Warwick Passage in 1883.

In 1896 a new building in the Arts and Crafts style was erected in Corporation Street to house James Henry Cook's vegetarian restaurant, one of the first in England. In 1898, The Pitman Vegetarian Hotel, named after the famous vegetarian Sir Isaac Pitman, was opened on the same site, and the proprietors subsequently opened a long-running health food store. It is said that Mahatma Gandhi dined at the restaurant when he visited Birmingham on 18 October 1931.

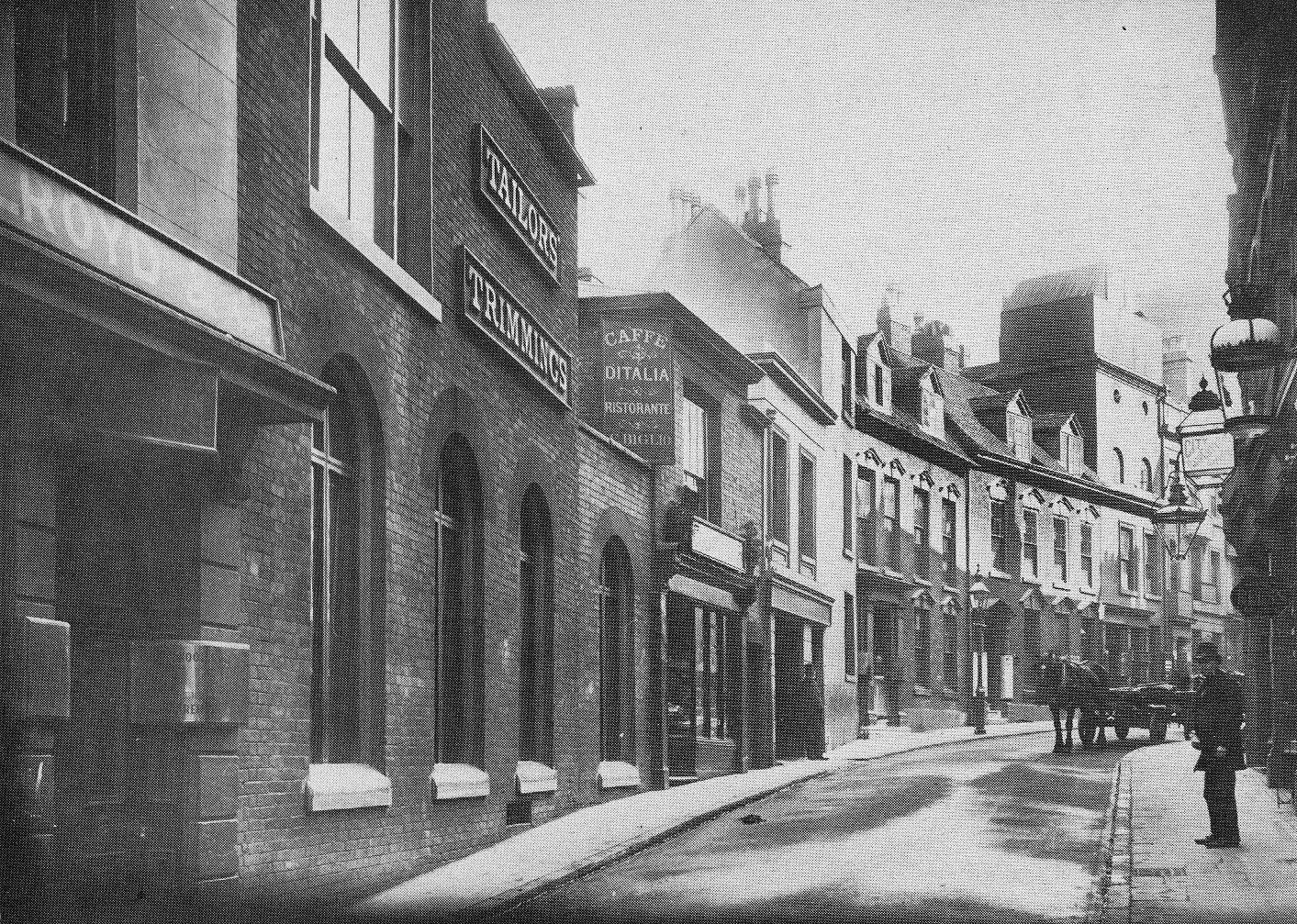
Cannon Street in 1892, with the sign of "Caffe D'Italia" visible in the centre

In the latter years of the Victorian era, a number of Italians migrated to Birmingham and occupied a small number of streets off Digbeth and by 1914 they numbered about 700 people, mostly originating from villages around Rome. Many were street-traders and sold the first ice cream in the city using broken eggs from the egg market in Moor Street and ice from Fazeley Street. Camillo Biglio opened a confectioner's shop in Cannon Street in 1878 and, afterwards, is thought to have opened the first Italian restaurant in Birmingham, Caffe D'Italia.

An edition of the Michelin Guide for the British Isles was first published in 1911 and stars were first awarded for restaurants in the mid-1920s. The edition published in 1925 recommended a single restaurant in Birmingham – The Exchange in Stephenson Place – which was awarded 3 stars, interpreted as signifying that the establishment was a "luxurious, well appointed restaurant". Subsequently, no Michelin Guides were published for Great Britain from 1931 to 1974.

Birmingham is home to a wide variety of Asian eateries, which have served the people of Birmingham since the 1940s. The first Chinese restaurant was the Tong Kung on Holloway Head, which opened in 1956. In the late 1950s there were also Kam Ling in Livery Street and Tung Hing at 15 Snow Hill. Notable also were The Slow Boat, opened in 1961 under St. Martin's car park (this business failed after a public health action for the use of illegal meat in its dishes), Heaven Bridge in Smallbrook Queensway, and, by 1968, The Old Happy Gathering in Pershore Street, which offered more authentic Cantonese cuisine, the earliest restaurants being more in the style of "chop suey houses".

In the early 1970s Chinese businesses and community associations were gathered around Hurst Street and Digbeth and Wing Yip opened the first Chinese supermarket in Bromsgrove Street, establishing a food empire in Birmingham which now has its headquarters in the Chinese Quarter, along with other fine oriental restaurants.

In 1945 Abdul Aziz, one of the first East Bengali (later known as Bangladeshi) immigrants to live in Birmingham, opened a cafe shop selling curry and rice in Steelhouse Lane with many policemen from the local police station as customers as well as solicitors and barristers who worked at the nearby law courts. This later became The Darjeeling and was the first Asian restaurant in Birmingham, owned by Afrose Miah. The second Asian restaurant in Birmingham was The Shah Bagh on Bristol Street. In 1957 Mozamel and Rachel Kazi changed the nature of their cafe, Rae's Cafe in Bristol Street, from a 'greasy spoon' to a shop where curry was served and its resulting popularity necessitated that it be moved to larger premises in Moseley Road, where it was called Jinnah's. John Bonham who became the drummer in the group Led Zeppelin, dined there regularly. The Kazis' son, John, came up with the novel idea of home delivery of food to regular customers as well as a takeaway service whereby customers took their own pots to the restaurant to have them filled with curry and rice for 25p. Also noteworthy was The Curry House opened by Abdul Motin Choudhury and Abdul Jabbar on Bristol Street in 1965, which was later to become the Aloka in 1981. There was also the Banu restaurant on Hagley Road, which was opened in 1969.

The dish known as balti was invented in Birmingham in the 1970s in restaurants owned by members of the Pakistani community in Sparkbrook, many of whom had migrated to the city from the Mirpur area of Pakistan in the 1960s. When non-Pakistani customers began to visit their restaurants, they required curries to be cooked more quickly than occurred in traditional Mirpuri cuisine and the restaurateurs consequently developed dishes in which meat was cooked off the bone at higher temperatures in steel dishes with fresh dried spices rather than curry pastes and vegetable oil in place of the traditional ghee. The steel dishes in which the food was cooked were called "baltis" (said to derive from the Hindi word "balty", meaning "a bucket") and then the food was served in the steel dishes with naan bread.

The geographical area in which the balti serving restaurants were concentrated became known as the Balti Triangle and is defined as having a northern apex at the junction of the A41 and A453 Camp Hill roundabout, an eastern boundary of the A41 going south to Stratford Road, a western boundary of the A453, and a southern edge just north of Wake Green Road and College Road. A visit to a restaurant in the Balti Triangle is often promoted as an important activity for tourists visiting Birmingham.

The first recorded written reference to balti dishes was made in a 1984 edition of Curry Magazine and it is said that as of 2016 there are about balti 50 restaurants located in the Balti Triangle. In 1998, the balti restaurateurs formed themselves into the Birmingham Balti Association.

In the city centre, among current notable south Asian restaurants are the Rajdoot in George Street in the Jewellery Quarter, which serves North Indian cuisine and which was opened in 1966, and which lists among its former notable customers The Beatles, The Princess Margaret and, more recently, the television personality Simon Cowell. In Hurst Street is The Maharajah, which also serves North Indian cuisine, having opened there in 1971. It was the Egon Ronay Indian Restaurant of the Year in 1999 and among its former notable customers were John Major, Cliff Richard, and Take That.

Off St. Paul's Square in James Street is located Lasan, which opened in 2002 and which won "Gordon Ramsay's F Word Best Local Restaurant" award on Channel 4 television. The then chef-director, Aktar Islam, has appeared in BBC's Great British Menu three times: in 2013 and 2014, as well as in 2011, when his dish of sea bass with battered soft shell crab won the fish course category. Islam left his role at Lasan in late 2017 and opened two new restaurants in Summer Row in May 2018 and December 2018 respectively – Opheem, which serves progressive Indian cuisine, and the neighbouring Legna, which has since closed.

Outside the city centre and Balti Triangle, the many suburbs of Birmingham are home to numerous South Asian-style restaurants, some of which are award-winning, an example being Thania Spice, situated in the small suburb of West Heath, whose chef, Abdul Subhan, was awarded the "Curry Life" award of 2013 as one of the 42 best curry chefs in the United Kingdom.

After World War II, the Berni brothers (Frank and Aldo), two Welshmen of Italian ancestry, established what became known as a Berni Inn in Bristol in 1955. European-style food was served there and a classic menu of prawn cocktail starter, steak or chicken in a basket main course and Black Forest gateau dessert became familiar to British diners. Branches of Berni Inns gradually extended throughout the West Country and the English Midlands and further afield but it was not until 1967–8 that Berni Inns were opened in Birmingham – the Wagon and Horses and the White Swan.

During the late 1980s, the restaurant of The Plough And Harrow Hotel in Hagley Road in Edgbaston was considered to be one of Birmingham's finest dining venues. Andreas Antona was head chef at The Plough And Harrow from 1987 for three years before opening Simpson's in Kenilworth in 1993 (see below). The Plough And Harrow is situated in a building dating back to 1704.

In 2005, Opus was opened by entrepreneur Ann Tonks and Chef Director David Colcombe in Cornwall Street and the restaurant subsequently won several awards as a modern British restaurant. David Colcombe left his post there in 2015. In his training he had studied at Solihull College and afterward under Anton Mosimann at the Dorchester Hotel in London and then the Lygon Arms in Broadway, Worcestershire. He later worked at the former Swallow Hotel in Birmingham (now The Marriott Hotel). After Colcombe's departure, Birmingham-born Ben Ternent was promoted in May 2015 from Head Chef to Executive Chef at Opus. The restaurant put a particular emphasis on "sustainability" of foods. Prior to restaurants being allowed by the British government to reopen on 17 May 2021 after the third lockdown as the COVID-19 pandemic receded, it was announced on 12 May 2021 that Opus would not reopen and was closed permanently.

In The Good Food Guide list of the Top 50 British restaurants for 2017, Simpson's was placed in the number 35 position and Adam's was placed at number 41 in the table. This was the first time that Simpson's had appeared in the Top 50 list but it was not included in the 2019 list. Adam's had occupied the number 29 place in the list in 2016 with no other Birmingham restaurants being included in the list in that year. The position of Adam's in the list was reduced to number 47 in the 2019 list. Purnell's was placed in the number 38 place in the 2014 list, at number 37 in the 2013 list and at number 47 in the 2010 list.

Nine Birmingham restaurants (Adam's, Carter's of Moseley, Folium, Harborne Kitchen, Lasan, Opus, Purnell's, Purnell's Bistro and Simpsons) were included in the 2019 Good Food Guide listings compared with 11 the previous year (Two Cats Kitchen, Edmund's and Turner's at No. 69 having closed and only Folium having been added to the list).

The Good Food Guide 2020 increased the number of listed Birmingham restaurants back to 11 (‘cooking scores’ in brackets): Adam's (7) Carter's Of Moseley (6), Folium (4), Harborne Kitchen (6), Lasan (3), Opheem (4), Opus (2), The Oyster Club (4), Purnell's (6), Purnell's Bistro (2) and Simpsons (6), with Adam's being the only Birmingham restaurant to appear in its ‘The Top 50, The UK’s best restaurants’, being placed at number 49 (a fall of 2 places since 2019).

The dining scene in Birmingham continues to evolve and notable restaurants included Two Cats Kitchen, which opened in Warstone Lane in the Jewellery Quarter in July 2015 after a period of operating as a pop-up restaurant called Two Cats Roaming. Its Midlands-born chef and owner, Niki Astley, who established the restaurant with his Latvian partner Diana Fjordorova, had previously worked at White Horse in Fulham and The Church in Birmingham's Jewellery Quarter. Two Cats Kitchen specialised in "New Baltic Cuisine" and intended to "shed light on Baltic-Russian cuisine by recognising traditional dishes and attempting new ones". Notable dishes were "Beetroot and buttermilk Gazpacho" and a dessert of celeriac ice cream pears, birch biscuit and verbena. The 2017 edition of the Michelin Guide Great Britain and Ireland included "Two Cats" in its listing of Birmingham restaurants. In March 2017 Astley announced that the food presented at Two Cats would have less emphasis on "New Baltic" food and would be given a "wider culinary exploration" but the restaurant closed on 30 September 2017.

The Wilderness, founded by Alex Claridge, began life as Nomad in April 2015, a pop-up restaurant initially situated at the Kitchen Garden Cafe in Kings Heath. Prior to founding Nomad, Claridge had worked at the Warehouse Cafe in Digbeth and Bistro 1847 in Great Western Arcade. The restaurant opened in the Birmingham Open Media building in Dudley Street in November 2015, with Brian Smith working as head chef. The restaurant aimed to serve British food with ingredients taken from the restaurant's own allotments as well as from foraging, but it closed on 7 May 2016, after being threatened with legal action by the NoMad Hotel in New York, and reopened as The Wilderness on 25 May 2016 with new internal decorations. Claridge closed The Wilderness on 29 December 2017, intending to reopen in February 2018 in the building in Bennett's Hill which was formerly occupied by Adam's, but work was delayed and the restaurant reopened in March 2018 in a temporary location in Warstone Lane in the building which had formerly housed Two Cats Kitchen and before that, La Toque D'Or.

Stu Deeley, who won the BBC One television series MasterChef: The Professionals 2019, was head chef at The Wilderness until December 2019, when he left to open his own restaurant in the Jewellery Quarter and was succeeded by Marius Gedminas who had been a sous chef at the restaurant. Deeley had studied at Halesowen College and previously worked at Simpsons.

Claridge opened a new restaurant in Bennett's Hill in November 2018 with the name of Nocturnal Animals. The head chef of Nocturnal Animals (named after the 2016 movie, and inspired by the film's 1980s-inspired soundtrack) was Brett Connor, a former competitor on BBC's Masterchef The Professionals. The food was influenced by Japanese and Far Eastern cuisine, but customers were confused by the restaurant's theme and so its name was changed on 20 March 2019 to Kisama. Pedro Miranda, who had previously worked at Rofuto in the Park Regis Hotel in Broad Street, was appointed head chef and the theme of Japanese/Far Eastern cuisine was emphasised. Miranda left the post in July 2019 and Claridge ended his involvement with Kisama on 9 August, resulting in the restaurant's closure on 13 August 2019.

In the mid-2010s there was a growing trend to the establishment of "pop-up" restaurants in Birmingham whereby a chef would establish a temporary restaurant for varying periods of time in non-permanent and different locations. For the period that Adam's Restaurant existed in Bennett's Hill, it termed itself a pop-up restaurant. As mentioned above, both Niki Astley and Alex Claridge used the device of serving their food in pop-up restaurants before opening their own more permanent establishments. The Kitchen Garden Cafe in Kings Heath has often hosted pop-up restaurants. The chef, Ben Tesh, worked from a pop-up restaurant at the Kitchen Garden. He had initially trained at Colin McGurran's Michelin-starred Winteringham Fields restaurant in north-east Lincolnshire and then been head chef at Anthony's Restaurant in Leeds, as well as gaining experience at Noma in Denmark under René Redzepi. In 2013 he worked under Alex Bond at Turner's restaurant in Harborne. He later ran his pop-up restaurant in Birmingham from 2016 until 8 April 2017 for nine months at the Urban Coffee Company in Church Street and eventually opened his first permanent restaurant, Folium, in Caroline Street in the Jewellery Quarter in late November 2017.

Andrew Sheridan heads up the kitchen at Craft Dining Rooms, which was opened in the International Conference Centre on 15 July 2019 by Sam and Emma Morgan. Sheridan collaborated with Kray Treadwell, who had worked at Michael O’Hare's The Man Behind The Curtain in Leeds for three and half years in serving dinners in which each cooked alternate courses in late 2019. Treadwell began his career in a junior role at Simpsons, moving to Glynn Purnell's The Asquith, The Blind Swine in York and thence to Leeds. In early 2020 Tredwell hosted several pop-up dinners at the Selina Hotel in Livery Street in the Jewellery Quarter whilst working on plans to open his own restaurant named 670 Grams after the birth weight of his daughter in the Custard Factory in Digbeth but the restaurant's opening was delayed because of the shutdown of restaurants necessitated by the COVID-19 pandemic of spring 2020.

Digbeth Dining Club, a weekly street food market, opened in August 2012 by former cameraman Jack Brabant. On 17 and 18 September 2016 the British Street Food Annual Awards was held at the site. From January 2017 the Digbeth Dining Club was held two evenings per week, Fridays and Saturdays, with the emphasis on Saturdays being on music and street entertainment.

Birmingham has numerous restaurants which are parts of nationwide chains. In April 2018 The Ivy Temple Row opened in a location close to Birmingham Cathedral. This restaurant is part of the chain based on the original Ivy restaurant opened in Covent Garden in 1917.. On 1 February 2019 the Smith Brothers opened the third branch of their contemporary Chinese restaurant, Tattu, in the refurbished old boiler room of The Grand Hotel in Barwick Street, the original restaurant having been opened in Manchester in 2015.

=== Michelin starred restaurants ===
The Birmingham dining scene in the 1970s is highlighted by the 1974 edition of the "Michelin Guide Great Britain and Ireland" which was the first edition of the British guide to have been published since 1931. The Guide mentioned the following restaurants in Birmingham and its surroundings: "Lorenzo" in Park Street (Italian), "La Capanna" in Hurst Street (Italian), "Lambert Court" on Hagley Road, "Burlington" off New Street, "Danish Food Centre" in Stephenson Place, the "Royal" in Sutton Coldfield and "Manor House" in West Bromwich. There were no starred restaurants at that time in Birmingham.

By the mid-1980s Italian restaurants were still prominent in the Michelin Guide Great Britain and Ireland – and the 1983 edition listed "Rajdoot" (see above, then located in Albert Street), "Jonathan's" (English cuisine) on Wolverhampton Road, "Pinocchio" (Italian) off Harborne Road, and "Giovanni's" (Italian) in Kings Heath, along with the previously mentioned Italian restaurants, "Lorenzo's" and "La Capanna". The list also included "La Gondola" (Italian) and "Le Bon Viveur", both in Sutton Coldfield, and "Franzi's", an Austrian-style restaurant located in Bearwood. No restaurants in Birmingham then held a star rating.

A decade later, the 1993 Michelin Guide Great Britain and Ireland was dramatically changed in the style of cuisine featured in its listing – with the most highly rated restaurant being "Sir Edward Elgar's" at the Swallow Hotel in Hagley Road, followed by "Sloan's" in Edgbaston. The other listed restaurants were South Asian or Chinese in style – :- "Maharaja" in Hurst Street, "Purple Rooms" (Indian) in Hall Green, Henry's (Chinese) in St. Paul's Square, "Henry Wong" (Chinese) in Harborne, "Days of the Raj" in Dale End and "Dynasty" (Chinese) in Hurst Street. "Franzl's" (Austrian) in Bearwood continued to appear in the list and "Lombard Room" in Kings Norton was also listed.

By the turn of the millennium, European-style restaurants had become far more prominent in Michelin's Birmingham lists and the 2001 "Michelin The Red Guide Great Britain and Ireland" recommended "Sir Edward Elgar's" at the Marriot Hotel, formerly the Swallow Hotel, "Number 282" at the Hyatt Regency Hotel, "Gilmore" situated in a former rolling mill in the Jewellery Quarter, the "Metro Bar and Grill" in Cornwall Street, "Leftbank" in Broad Street and "Le Petit Blanc" in Brindleyplace. Only two non-European restaurants then appeared in the list:- "Henry's" in St. Paul's Square and "Mizan" in Hall Green.

By the time of the publication of the Michelin Guide Great Britain and Ireland 2005 edition, British and French style-restaurants dominated the lists and set the scene for the next decade or so. The edition listed Birmingham's first two restaurants with single stars, "Simpson's" and "Jessica's" (see below), along with "Paris" in The Mailbox, "Bank" in Brindleyplace, "La Toque D'or" in the Jewellery Quarter, the "Metro Bar and Grill", the "Zinc Bar and Grill" in Gas Street Basin, "Liaison " in Hall Green and "Le Petit Blanc". The Indian-style restaurants listed were "Cafe Lazeez" (north Indian) in The Mailbox and "Shimla Pinks" in Broad Street with "Henry's" Chinese-style restaurant continuing to appear in the list along with "Buonissimo" (Italian) in Harborne.

By the time of the publication of the 2017 Michelin Guide the city had five starred restaurants with two more in the city's close vicinity: Simpson's in Edgbaston, which retained its 1 star grading which had been awarded to it in 2005; Purnell's in Cornwall Street in the city centre and "Turner's at 69" in Harborne, both of which had been awarded 1 star in 2009; Adam's, which relocated to Waterloo Street in 2016, and had been awarded 1 star in 2013; and Carter's of Moseley which was awarded 1 star in the 2016 Michelin Guide. "Peel's Restaurant at Hampton Manor" in Hampton-in-Arden, under its Head Chef, Robert Palmer, was awarded its star for the first time in the 2017 Guide and "The Cross At Kenilworth" had achieved its first star in 2014. Birmingham has more Michelin-starred restaurants in Great Britain than any other city apart from London

Apart from the starred restaurants mentioned above, "Opus at Cornwall Street", "Andy Waters", "Two Cats" and the two Asian-style restaurants – "Lasan" and "Asha's" in Newhall Street – were mentioned in the 2017 edition of the Michelin Guide Great Britain and Ireland. In the 2018 edition, these restaurants were all awarded the newly introduced "Michelin Plate" ("Good cooking. Fresh ingredients, carefully prepared: simply a good meal") apart from "Two Cats" which had closed. "Turner's at 69" which had lost its Michelin star and "The Wilderness" also received the new award. In 2019 the 'Michelin Plate' was awarded again to all of those which received the 2018 award apart from 'Lasan' after Aktar Islam had moved from the restaurant and 'Turner's at 69' which had closed while Ben Tesh's 'Folium', 'Harborne Kitchen' and Aktar Islam's new restaurant 'Opheem' all received the award, therefore increasing the number of Michelin Plate restaurants in Birmingham to seven.

There were no changes to Birmingham's star status in the 2019 Michelin awards but Paul Foster's 'Salt', opened in 2017, was awarded a single star in nearby Stratford upon Avon. In the 2020 Michelin star awards ceremony on 7 October 2019, Aktar Islam's ‘Opheem’ was awarded one star and the city therefore returned to the status of being home to 5 Michelin stars. In 2021 at an online ceremony held on 25 January, all five starred restaurants retained their stars and no new starred restaurants were added. However Kray Tredwell was awarded the Young Chef of Great Britain and Ireland 2021 title.

==== List of Michelin starred restaurants in Birmingham ====
Restaurant	Chef	Cuisine	Location	1 Michelin star	2 Michelin stars	3 Michelin stars	Current	Ref.
Restaurant	Chef	Cuisine	Location	Year to star			Current	Ref.
Adams	Adam Stokes	Modern cuisine	City Centre	2014–present	—	—	1 Michelin star	
Carters of Moseley	Brad Carter	Modern British	Moseley	2015–present	—	—	1 Michelin star	
Jessica's	Glynn Purnell	Modern cuisine	Edgbaston	2005–2007	—	—	Closed	
Opheem	Aktar Islam	Indian cuisine	48 Summer Row	2020–present	—	—	1 Michelin star	
Purnell's	Glynn Purnell	Modern cuisine	City Centre	2009–present	—	—	1 Michelin star	
Simpsons	Luke Tipping	Modern cuisine	Kenilworth, Warwickshire (1993–2004); Edgbaston (2004–present)	1999–present	—	—	1 Michelin star	
Turners at 69	Richard Turner	Modern British	Harborne	2009–2018	—	—	Closed	
Peel's Restaurant	Rob Palmer	Modern British	Hampton-in-Arden	2015–2022	—	—	Closed	
The Cross at Kenilworth	Adam Bennett	Modern British	Kenilworth	2014–present	—	—	1 Michelin star	

==== Adam's ====
Adam Stokes, originally from Northampton, opened "Adam’s" with his wife Natasha as a "2 year pop-up" restaurant in Bennett's Hill in 2013. He had previously worked up to Sous Chef under Aaron Patterson at Hambleton Hall in Leicestershire and then in 2008, at the age of 26, became Head Chef at Glenapp Castle in the Scottish Lowlands and achieved his first Michelin star there a few days before his 30th birthday. He relocated "Adam's" to Waterloo Street in January 2016 having been awarded a Michelin star for "Adam's" in 2014. In 2017 the restaurant was awarded the title "Best Fine Dining Restaurant" at the Midlands Food Drinks And Hospitality awards. Tom Shepherd who had worked previously at Restaurant Sat Bains in Nottingham was appointed Head Chef in July 2017.

Stokes opened a second restaurant in Temple Street in the city centre on 1 April 2019. Specialising in fish and seafood dishes it is named ‘The Oyster Club’ and the Head Chef is Rosanne Moseley who worked for Stokes at ‘Adam’s’ from February 2014 until she took up her post at the new restaurant. Moseley was a participant in the BBC television ‘Masterchef - The Professionals’ during the time she worked at ‘Adam’s’.

==== Carters of Moseley ====
Carters of Moseley was opened in November 2010 by chef Brad Carter and his partner, Holly Jackson, to serve British cuisine. Brad Carter had studied at University College, Birmingham (previously the Birmingham College of Food) and then worked in Marseilles and Menorca, and Michelin-starred restaurants in southern England and London. His restaurant was given the Good Food Guide Restaurant of the Year award in 2015 and achieved 1 star in the 2016 Michelin Guide. In the Birmingham Food, Drink and Hospitality Awards of June 2016, Holly Jackson was named Best Restaurant Manager. In the renamed Midlands Food, Drink and Hospitality Awards of 2017, Brad Carter was named Best Chef. In 2018 the restaurant was placed in the number 66 position of the Estrella National Restaurant Awards having occupied the number 91 position in 2016 and having been unplaced in 2017.

==== Jessica's ====
Purnell's Chef-Proprietor, Glynn Purnell, was formerly chef at "Jessica's" on Portland Road in Edgbaston, which opened in July 2003 by Keith and Diane Stevenson and was awarded AA Restaurant of the Year within one year of opening. Jessica's was awarded 1 Michelin star in 2005 and retained it until the restaurant closed in 2007, when Glynn Purnell and his wife and partner, Kerry O'Carroll, decided to open their own restaurant in Cornwall Street. The former Jessica's was reopened by the former Maitre D', Pascal Cluny, as Pascal's and it was awarded a Michelin Bib in 2008. Subsequently, Glynn Purnell acquired the building to open a restaurant called "The Asquith" but this was relocated to Newhall Street and later renamed "Purnell's Bistro". The building that had housed Jessica's was eventually converted into luxury apartments.

==== Purnell's ====
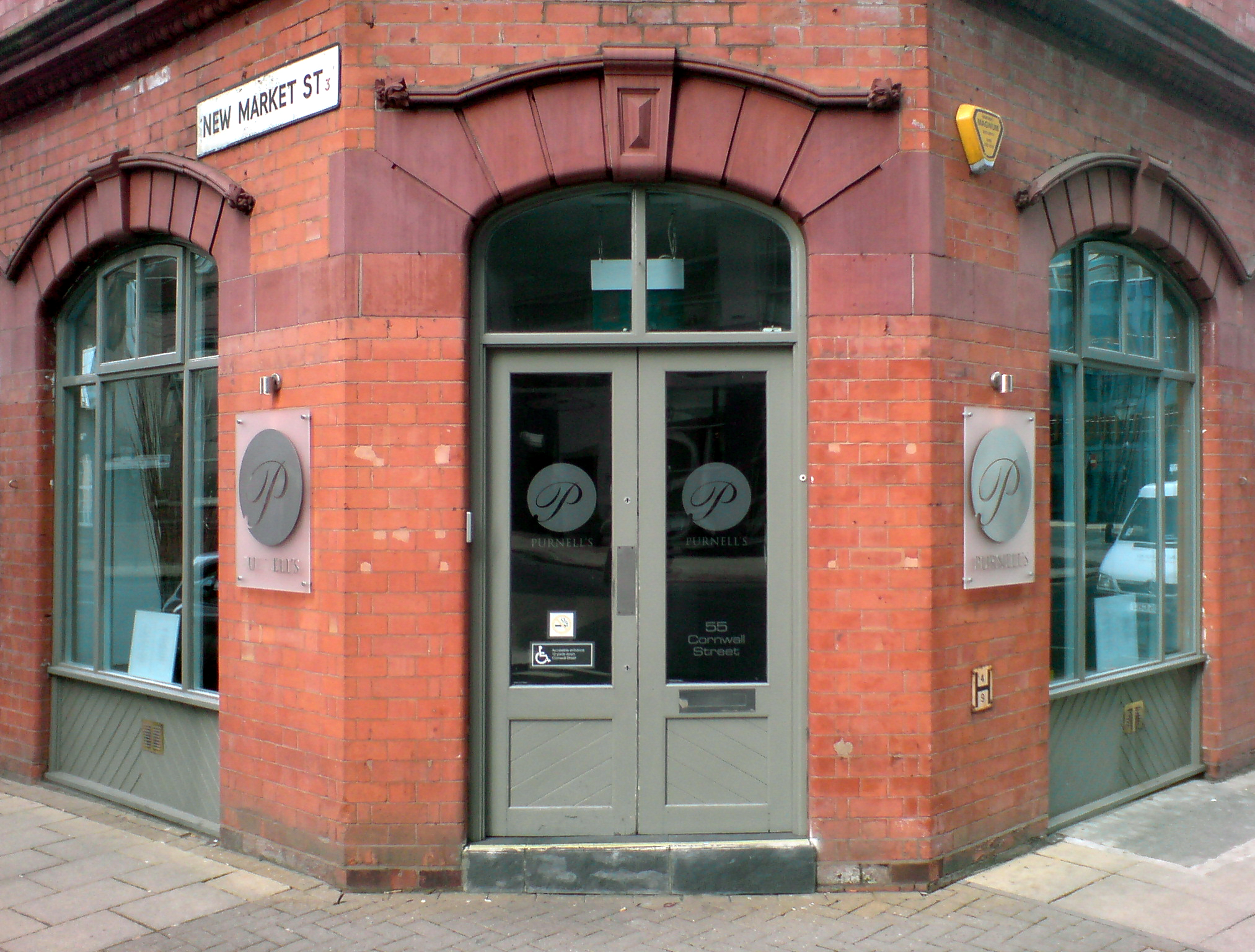
Purnell's, Michelin-starred restaurant, in Birmingham City centre

Glynn Purnell, who had once worked as a Chef de Partie and then Sous Chef at Simpson's in Kenilworth, is a familiar face on British television food programmes and won The Great British Menu competition for two consecutive years (2008, with strawberries with tarragon and black pepper honeycomb with burnt English cream surprise and, in 2009, with masala spiced monkfish with red lentils, pickled carrots, and coconut). Purnell's first book, Cracking Yolks And Pig Tales, was published in 2014. In 2016, Purnell became one of the regular guest hosts on the BBC television programme "Saturday Kitchen". In the Birmingham Food, Drink and Hospitality Awards of June 2016 Glynn Purnell was chosen Best Chef and Purnell's Restaurant was named Best Michelin Star Restaurant. Purnell's second book, "Rib-ticklers & Choux-ins", containing 110 recipes, was published on 15 September 2016.

Before opening Purnell's in July 2007, Glynn Purnell was quoted by the Birmingham Mail as saying that he hoped that the new restaurant would achieve the award of 2 Michelin stars in 5 to 7 years but that hope remains unfulfilled. The restaurant was awarded 1 Michelin star in 2009. The first Maitre D' at Purnell's was Jean Benoit Burloux who had previously worked in a more junior role at Jessica's. He was succeeded by Sonal Clare in 2014, who began work at Purnell's in 2008 as a waiter and was awarded the Best Sommelier Award at the GQ Food and Drink Awards 2018 in May 2018. Sonal Clare left Purnell's on 21 December 2019 to work as General Manager and Head Sommelier at The Wilderness from January 2020. He was succeeded at Purnell's by Jared Samborski in January 2020.

In June 2018 Purnell was asked to create a dish to commemorate the 50th anniversary of the beginning of work to construct 'Spaghetti Junction', the Gravelley Hill roadway interchange, and he received considerable publicity for his dish of potato and celeriac 'spaghetti' with a cream and ginger sauce finished off with truffle.

==== Simpsons ====
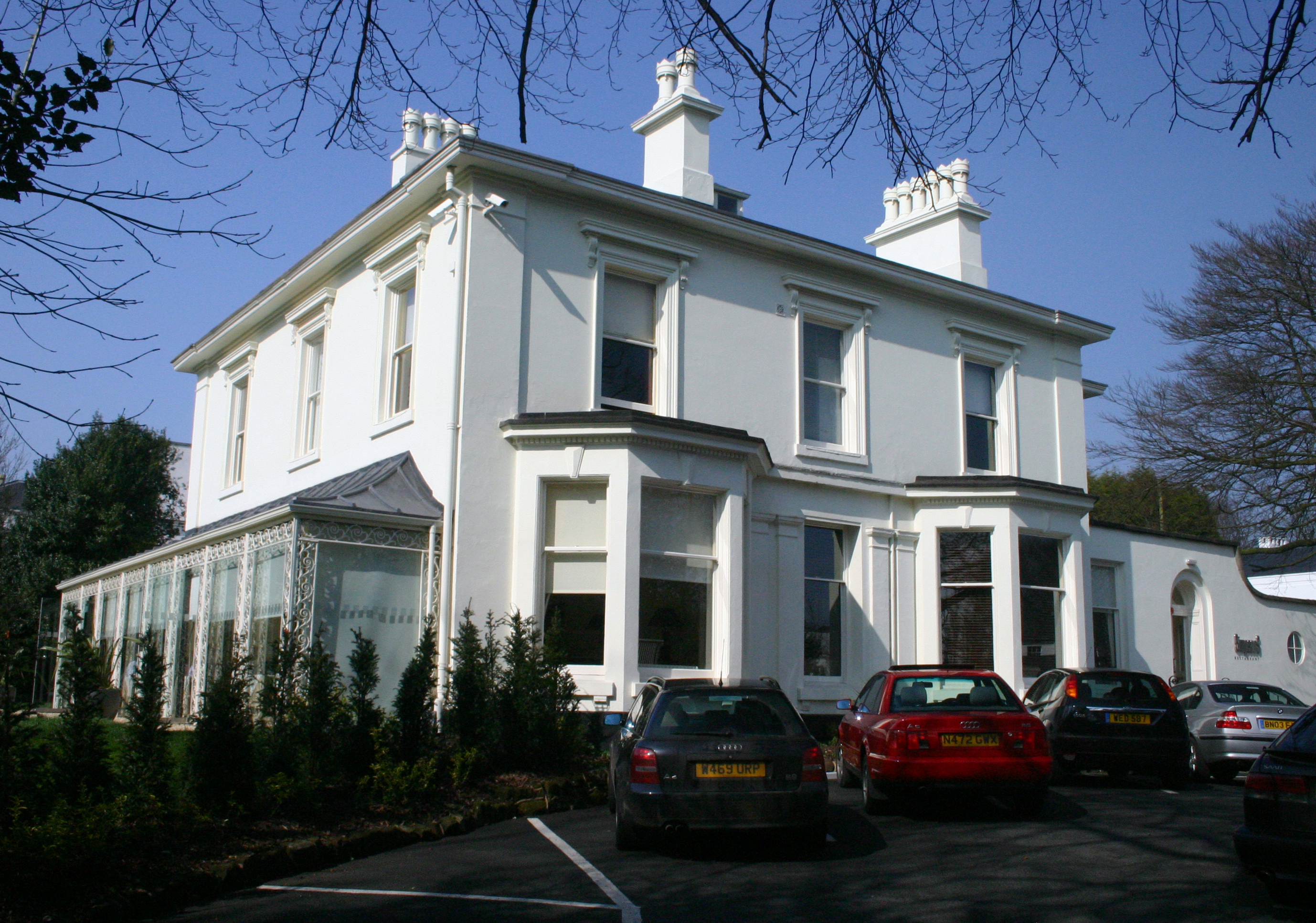
Simpson's restaurant in Edgbaston

In 2004, Andreas Antona opened Simpson's Restaurant in Edgbaston Birmingham, within a Grade II-listed building. Antona founded the original Simpson's in Kenilworth in 1993, which was awarded a Michelin star in the Michelin Guide Great Britain and Ireland 2000. Chef Director Luke Tipping had previously been Chef at Simpson's in Kenilworth. Andreas Antona was later to establish a restaurant at The Cross in Kenilworth where the Head Chef is Adam Bennett, who had worked for Antona at Simpson's in Kenilworth and subsequently, has been Head Chef in the Edgbaston restaurant. The name "Simpson's" was taken from the chemist's shop, belonging to Antona's father-in-law, which occupied the site in Kenilworth before Antona opened his restaurant there. After the Edgbaston restaurant had been closed for a short period for redecoration towards the end of 2015, Nathan Eades, who previously had had his own restaurant for a short while in nearby Bromsgrove, took over as Head Chef from Matt Cheal who left to open his own restaurant, "Cheal's of Henley" in the village of Henley in Arden, between Birmingham and Stratford-upon-Avon. Nathan Eades left Simpson's in December 2017 to work at the 'Wild Rabbit Inn' in Kingham. Previously, Andy Waters, another former Head Chef of Simpsons, had had a restaurant, "Edmund's", in Henley in Arden before moving it to Birmingham and then going on to open "Waters In The Square" at Five Ways and then the restaurant "Andy Waters" at Resorts World at the National Exhibition Centre. In November 2018 Waters announced that he was giving up his role at the Resorts World restaurant and Aaron Darnley became Head Chef there with the restaurant's name being changed to 'Sky By Waters'. Andy Waters became Head Chef at ‘Pebble Beach’ restaurant in Barton-on-Sea in Hampshire in October 2019. Cheal's of Henley received the Judges Choice Award in the Birmingham Food, Drink And Hospitality Awards in June 2016. Corin Ireland of Simpsons was named Best Sommelier in the same awards. In 2018 PETA (The People For the Ethical Treatment of Animals Foundation) included Simpsons in a list of the 10 best restaurants to serve vegan food in Britain. Luke Tipping was appointed Honorary Professor of Culinary Arts at University College Birmingham in 2010. At one time Simpson's had three winners of the 'British Culinary Federation Chef Of The Year' award - Luke Tipping, Adam Bennett and Matt Cheal - all working there at the same time.

==== Turners at 69 ====
Turner's Restaurant (later known as "Turner's at 69") on the High Street in Harborne was opened by Midlands-born Richard Turner in 2007 and was awarded 1 Michelin star in January 2009. Turner's work had previously included some years at Thrales Restaurant in Lichfield which was closed in 2011. Alex Bond later worked at Turner's as Head Chef while Richard Turner was Executive Chef. The restaurant specialised in French and British cuisine. On 9 June 2016, Richard Turner announced that he was intending to change the style of the restaurant to make the atmosphere more relaxed and to replace the serving of expensive multi-course "tasting menus" with an a la carte menu from August 2016. Following these changes Turner's at 69 lost its Michelin star in the 2018 Michelin Guide but was awarded a Michelin Plate. The restaurant closed on 15 January 2018. In May 2018 Richard Turner took on the post of Head Chef in the newly opened "Maribel" in Brindley Place in the location which had previously housed "Edmund's" but ceased to work there one year later in May 2019 and was replaced as Head Chef by Harvey Perttola who had worked previously at ‘Opus’, ‘Hampton Manor’ and Swinfen Hall in Lichfield.

==== Opheem ====
Aktar Islam's Opheem was awarded a single star on 7 October 2019 as part of the 2020 Michelin star awards. The restaurant's history is described above in more detail.

==== Peel's Restaurant ====
Peel's Restaurant was opened in 2008 by the Hill family. On 3 October 2016 it was awarded a Michelin-star and Michelin's Welcome and service award. Two weeks prior it won its fourth AA-rosette. In December 2022 it permanently closed.

== Events ==
Fairs and festivals dedicated to food were held in the Bullring during the 18th and 19th centuries though William de Birmingham had gained permission for a three-day-long Ascensiontide fair in 1250 with an additional Michaelmas fair taking place by 1400. The most popular fair was the (Michaelmas) Onion Fair, which celebrated the harvest of onions. It was held on the last Thursday of September in front of St. Martin's Church. In an article in The Illustrated London News published in October 1872 it was noted that dealers and customers of the fair were mainly "the country folk of Warwickshire with a few tradesmen of the town and some of the work men's wives for the onion gives a palatable relish to a poor man's dinner or supper". The sale of onions was accompanied by stalls, sideshows and amusements and special excursion trains were run to the event from all over the area but the sale of onions was separated from the amusements in 1875 with the latter moving to Aston to later become a large funfair.

The BBC Good Food Show takes place at The National Exhibition Centre and is Britain's biggest and most extensive food event.

The Colmore Food Festival has been held for 2 days in early July annually since 2011 in Victoria Square. It is organised by the Colmore Business District and highlights food and drink establishments in the area, offering members of the public the opportunity to sample food and drink and to attend cookery demonstrations by local chefs, including in the past, Glynn Purnell.

In recent years, a resurgent interest in local food has led to the growth of farmers markets. In line with other UK cities including London and Bristol, street food events have also gained in popularity, leading to national recognition.

In 2014, Birmingham Independent Food Fair at Millennium Point showcased local food businesses, with restaurants, producers, local brewing and distillery companies represented.

== COVID-19 pandemic ==
On 20 March 2020 all restaurants, public houses and bars in Birmingham and throughout England were closed on the orders of the government as a response to the coronavirus (COVID-19) pandemic which had taken hold in the country as part of the effort to reduce social contact which might otherwise have increased the spread of the virus. Establishments were allowed to reopen on 4 July 2020 and during the month of August the government operated a scheme called ‘Eat Out to Help Out’ to encourage people to dine out in restaurants by providing a government-funded discount scheme. Subsequently, with rising rates of COVID-19 the government introduced a system of tiers across England which regulated the activity of restaurants and their availability to the public with Birmingham being placed in the middle tier, tier 2.

A second lockdown began on 5 November 2020 when all restaurants in England were made to close again and this ended on 3 December 2020 with Birmingham emerging in a stricter tier 3 which resulted in all restaurants remaining closed except for the sale of takeaway meals. Many restaurants, including a number of the Michelin-starred restaurants – Purnell's, Simpsons, Opheem and Carter's of Moseley – offered a takeaway service during this period, a number having done so for weeks before. Another national lockdown came into law on the night of 5 to 6 January 2021 when all restaurants were once more closed though allowed to continue with takeaway services. The government allowed restaurants to reopen to indoor diners in groups of not more than six on 17 May 2021. However prior to that date, Michelin-Plated Opus in Cornwall Street announced on 12 May 2021 that it would not reopen and would remain permanently closed.

== Notable meals in Birmingham ==
In May 1998, the G8 Summit was held in Birmingham and the Summit banquet was held in Birmingham Botanical Gardens. The menu was constructed by Jonathan Harrison, Chef de Cuisine of The Swallow Hotel (see above), for the world leaders, including President Bill Clinton of The United States and Chancellor Helmut Kohl of Germany, and it was necessary to take note of foods which the leaders could not eat (Chancellor Kohl did not eat shellfish or lamb and President Clinton would not eat chocolate) and food eaten at other meals by the leaders – beef and asparagus were being served elsewhere and so could not appear on Harrison's menu. The final menu was made up of pan-fried Dover sole served with baby leeks and seasonal mushrooms and a Mediterranean sauce; Basque-style pork wrapped in Parma ham, roasted and braised served with quenelles of polenta and braised artichoke base filled with roasted peppers, aubergines, fennel and courgettes; and, for dessert, glazed lemon and mascarpone tart. The menu reflected Jonathan Harrison's previous experience of working under Alain Ducasse at Hotel de France and his wish to combine British food with Mediterranean-style cuisine. Harrison provided the banquet for 56 guests; the 18 VIP guests being seated in the Pavilion of the Botanical Gardens. Jonathan Harrison left Birmingham in 1999 to become Chef Patron of The Sandpiper Inn in Leyburn in North Yorkshire.

== Birmingham Food Competition Winners ==
Birmingham chefs have won some notable competitions in recent years including those featured in popular television programmes.

Glynn Purnell - (Purnell's) - Great British Menu", Series 3, 2008 (BBC 1). Winner of dessert course (beat Sat Bains) - Strawberries with tarragon and black pepper honeycomb with burnt English cream surprise. "Great British Menu", Series 4, 2009 (BBC 1). Winner of fish course (beat Daniel Clifford) - Masala spiced monkfish with red lentils, pickled carrots and coconut.

Aktar Islam - (Lasan, Opheem) - "The F Word", 2009 (Channel 4). His then restaurant, "Lasan" beat "The Pheasant", Keystone in the final. "Great British Menu", Series 6, 2011 (BBC 1). Winner of fish course (beat Richard Bainbridge and Sue Ellis) - Sea bass with battered soft shell crab".

Stu Deeley - (The Wilderness) - "Masterchef The Professionals", Series 12, 2019 (BBC 1). Won the Finals with the following dishes - Starter, Soy and mirin soaked salmon ballotine with crispy salmon skin and cherry tomatoes marinated in dashi vinegar; Main course, Lovage and rosemary-brined guinea fowl topped with a yeast hazelnut crumb and a spiced guinea fowl sauce; Dessert, Cep mushroom and milk chocolate cookie, dusted in coffee cep powder with a milk chocolate and yogurt cream.

Andrew Sheridan - (Craft Dining Rooms and 8) - “Great British Menu”, Series 13, 2018 (BBC 1), Runner up in the Wales heats. “Great British Menu”, Series 14, 2019, Finalist.

Alex Claridge - (The Wilderness) - “Great British Menu”, Series 15, 2020 (BBC 1). Chosen to be one of four chefs participating in the 2020 Central region heats. He was the only chef in this heat who actually worked in Birmingham and The West Midlands. Screening of the series began in mid-March 2020. His showcased dishes were an amuse bouche of steak tartare, a starter titled ‘Nah ...You’re revolting’ (which included a locust bharji with wood ants and mealworms) and a fish course titled ‘Goth apple’ centred on a scallop and apple. He was eliminated after the fish course.
