= Dacryodes rubiginosa =

Scientific classification
- Kingdom: Plantae
- Clade: Tracheophytes
- Clade: Angiosperms
- Clade: Eudicots
- Clade: Rosids
- Order: Sapindales
- Family: Burseraceae
- Genus: Dacryodes
- Species: D. rubiginosa

Binomial name
- Dacryodes rubiginosa (A.W.Benn.) H.J.Lam

Species of plant in the family Burseraceae

Dacryodes rubiginosa is a tree in the family Burseraceae. The specific epithet rubiginosa is from the Latin meaning 'rust-coloured', referring to the tomentum.

== Description ==
Dacryodes rubiginosa grows up to 20 metres (70 ft) tall with a trunk diameter of up to 20 centimetres (8 in). The flowers are tomentose. The ellipsoid fruits measure up to 2.5 cm (1 in) long.

== Distribution and habitat ==
Dacryodes rubiginosa grows naturally in Peninsular Malaysia and Borneo. Its habitat is lowland forest from sea-level to 200 metres (700 ft) altitude.
