= Dacryodes patentinervia =

Conservation status
- Least Concern (IUCN 3.1)

Scientific classification
- Kingdom: Plantae
- Clade: Tracheophytes
- Clade: Angiosperms
- Clade: Eudicots
- Clade: Rosids
- Order: Sapindales
- Family: Burseraceae
- Genus: Dacryodes
- Species: D. patentinervia

Binomial name
- Dacryodes patentinervia (Leenh.) P.S.Ashton

Synonyms
- Dacryodes macrocarpa var. patentinervia Leenh.

Bornean tree species

Dacryodes patentinervia is a tree in the family Burseraceae. It is endemic to Borneo, whereby it is known locally as sabal, sibut or seladah.

== Names ==
The species was mistakenly identified as Dacryodes expansa. It was also formerly classified as a subspecies of Dacryodes macrocarpa.

It is known as sabal in Brunei and by the Iban people, sibut by the Tutong and Dusun people in Brunei, and seladah in Sarawak.

== Description ==
Dacryodes patentinervia grows to 35 metres (115 ft) tall and 80 centimetres (31 in) in diameter. The buttresses are narrow and the bark is thin, flaky and pale yellow-brown in colour. The male flower is trimerous. The fruit is ellipsoid, grows up to 5 by 3 centimetres (2.0 in × 1.2 in), and is apple red in colour.

== Distribution and habitat ==
Dacryodes patentinervia is endemic to northwest Borneo, from the Rejang valley in Sarawak to as far as Bukit Hampuan in Sabah. It grows most abundantly in mixed dipterocarp forest. It can be found from sea level up to 1,500 metres (4,900 ft) elevation.

== Uses ==
The fruit is used as a laxative.
