= Sibut (disambiguation) =

Sibut is the capital of Kémo prefecture, Central African Republic.

Sibut may also refer to:

- Kampong Sibut, a village in Mukim Amo, Temburong District, Brunei
- A native name of the tree Dacryodes patentinervia

== See also ==
- Sibutu
