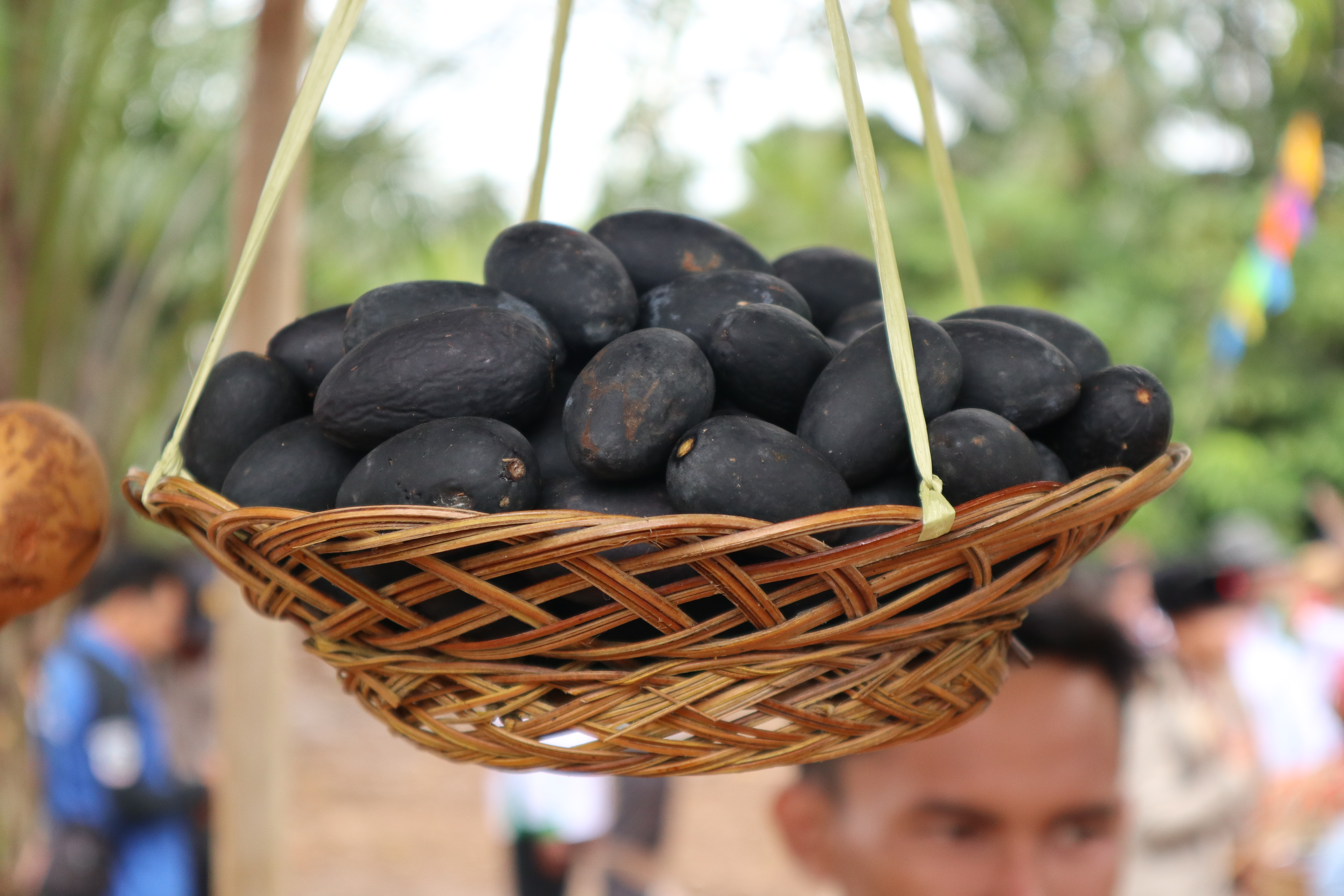
- D. rostrata fruits for sale in Indonesia.

Conservation status
- Least Concern (IUCN 2.3)

Scientific classification
- Kingdom: Plantae
- Clade: Tracheophytes
- Clade: Angiosperms
- Clade: Eudicots
- Clade: Rosids
- Order: Sapindales
- Family: Burseraceae
- Genus: Dacryodes
- Species: D. rostrata

Binomial name
- Dacryodes rostrata (Blume) H.J.Lam

Synonyms
- List: Canarium caudatifolium Merr.; Canarium crassifolium Merr.; Canarium cuspidatum Merr.; Canarium gilvescens Miq.; Canarium kadondon A.W.Benn.; Canarium minahassae Koord.; Canarium montanum Korth. ex Blume; Canarium rostriferum Miq.; Dacryodes rostrata f. cuspidata (Blume) H.J.Lam; Dacryodes rostrata f. pallida H.J.Lam; Dacryodes rostrata f. pubescens H.J.Lam; Dacryodes rostrata f. samarensis H.J.Lam; Dracontomelon cuspidatum Blume; Santiria rostrata Blume

= Dacryodes rostrata =

Species of tree

Dacryodes rostrata is a tree in the family Burseraceae. The specific epithet rostrata is from the Latin meaning 'beaked', referring to the narrow-tipped leaves.

== Description ==
Dacryodes rostrata grows up to 45 metres (150 ft) tall with a trunk diameter of up to 200 centimetres (80 in). The dark grey bark is smooth to scaly. The oblong or ovoid fruits ripen blue and measure up to 3.5 cm (1 in) long.

== Distribution and habitat ==
Dacryodes rostrata grows widely in Vietnam and western Malesia. Its habitat is mixed dipterocarp forest from sea-level to 800 metres (2,600 ft) altitude.
