= Dacryodes laxa =

Conservation status
- Least Concern (IUCN 2.3)

Scientific classification
- Kingdom: Plantae
- Clade: Tracheophytes
- Clade: Angiosperms
- Clade: Eudicots
- Clade: Rosids
- Order: Sapindales
- Family: Burseraceae
- Genus: Dacryodes
- Species: D. laxa

Binomial name
- Dacryodes laxa (A.W.Benn.) H.J.Lam

Synonyms
- Canarium fragile Engl.; Canarium laxum A.W.Benn.

Species of plant in the family Burseraceae

Dacryodes laxa is a tree in the family Burseraceae. The specific epithet laxa is from the Latin meaning 'loose', referring to the inflorescence.

== Description ==
Dacryodes laxa grows up to 30 metres (100 ft) tall with a trunk diameter of up to 30 centimetres (12 in). The grey bark is smooth to scaly. The flowers are white. The oblong or ovoid fruits are pink, ripening blue, and measure up to 4.5 cm (2 in) long.

== Distribution and habitat ==
Dacryodes laxa grows naturally in Sumatra, Peninsular Malaysia, Singapore and Borneo. Its habitat is mixed dipterocarp forests from sea-level to 700 metres (2,300 ft) altitude.
