= Dacryodes rugosa =

Scientific classification
- Kingdom: Plantae
- Clade: Tracheophytes
- Clade: Angiosperms
- Clade: Eudicots
- Clade: Rosids
- Order: Sapindales
- Family: Burseraceae
- Genus: Dacryodes
- Species: D. rugosa

Binomial name
- Dacryodes rugosa (Blume) H.J.Lam

Varieties
- D. r. var. virgata

Synonyms
- Canarium moultonii Ridl.; Canarium rugosum (Blume) Miq.; Canarium virgatum (Blume) Miq.

Species of tree

Dacryodes rugosa is a tree in the family Burseraceae. The specific epithet rugosa is from the Latin meaning 'wrinkled', referring to the leaflets.

== Description ==
Dacryodes rugosa grows up to 30 metres (100 ft) tall with a trunk diameter of up to 40 centimetres (16 in). The grey-white bark is smooth to scaly. The ovoid fruits measure up to 2.5 cm (1 in) long.

== Distribution and habitat ==
Dacryodes rugosa grows naturally in Sumatra, Peninsular Malaysia, Java and Borneo. Its habitat is lowland to hill mixed dipterocarp forests from sea-level to 900 metres (3,000 ft) altitude.
