= Dacryodes nervosa =

Conservation status
- Near Threatened (IUCN 3.1)

Scientific classification
- Kingdom: Plantae
- Clade: Tracheophytes
- Clade: Angiosperms
- Clade: Eudicots
- Clade: Rosids
- Order: Sapindales
- Family: Burseraceae
- Genus: Dacryodes
- Species: D. nervosa

Binomial name
- Dacryodes nervosa (H.J.Lam) Leenh.

Synonyms
- Santiria nervosa H.J.Lam

Species of tree

Dacryodes nervosa is a species of tree in the family Burseraceae. The specific epithet nervosa means 'with nerves', referring to the leaves.

== Description ==
Dacryodes nervosa grows up to 30 metres (100 ft) tall with a trunk diameter of up to 35 centimetres (14 in). The dark brown bark is smooth to scaly. The ellipsoid fruits are pink when fresh and measure up to 1.7 cm (1 in) long.

== Distribution and habitat ==
Dacryodes nervosa grows naturally in Sumatra, Peninsular Malaysia and Borneo. Its habitat is lowland forest from sea-level to 350 metres (1,000 ft) altitude.
