= Edward Trusted Bennett =

British botanist and psychical researcher

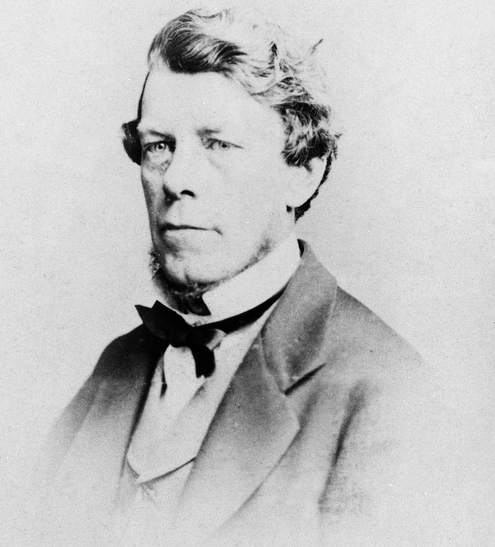
- Born: 1 July 1831; London
- Died: 16 November 1908 (aged 77); Port Isaac, Cornwall
- Occupation(s): Botanist, psychical researcher

Edward Trusted Bennett (1 July 1831 – 16 November 1908), best known as Edward T. Bennett, was a British botanist and psychical researcher.

== Biography ==
Bennett was born in London. His younger brother was the botanist Alfred William Bennett. As a young man he collected plant specimens in Cornwall and the New Forest. Bennett was the last Quaker in Britain to be disowned for holding different theological opinions. In 1873, he was disowned for supporting the heretical views of Charles Voysey.

He was a member of the British National Association of Spiritualists and the first secretary of the Society for Psychical Research. From 1882 to 1902 he worked as an assistant secretary for the Society.

He died in Port Isaac, Cornwall.

== Publications ==
- The Poetical Work of George Barlow: A Study (1903)
- The Society for Psychical Research: Its Rise & Progress & a Sketch of its Work (1903)
- Twenty Years of Psychical Research: 1882-1901 (1904)
- Automatic Speaking and Writing: A Study (1905)
- The Physical Phenomena Popularly Classed Under the Head of Spiritualism (1907) [With a brief introduction by Oliver Lodge]
- The Direct Phenomena of Spiritualism (1908)
- Psychic Phenomena (1909) [With a foreword by Oliver Lodge]
