= Dacryodes dungii =

Scientific classification
- Kingdom: Plantae
- Clade: Tracheophytes
- Clade: Angiosperms
- Clade: Eudicots
- Clade: Rosids
- Clade: Malvids
- Order: Sapindales
- Family: Burseraceae
- Genus: Dacryodes
- Species: D. dungii

Binomial name
- Dacryodes dungii Than Dinh Dai & GP Yakovlev

Species of plant

Dacryodes dungii is a tropical forest tree species in the family Burseraceae. It has only been recorded from Vietnam, where it may be called xuyên mộc dung; no subspecies are listed in the Catalogue of Life.
