= The Pitman Vegetarian Hotel =

Hotel in Birmingham, England

Coordinates: 52°28′58.41″N 1°53′38.12″W

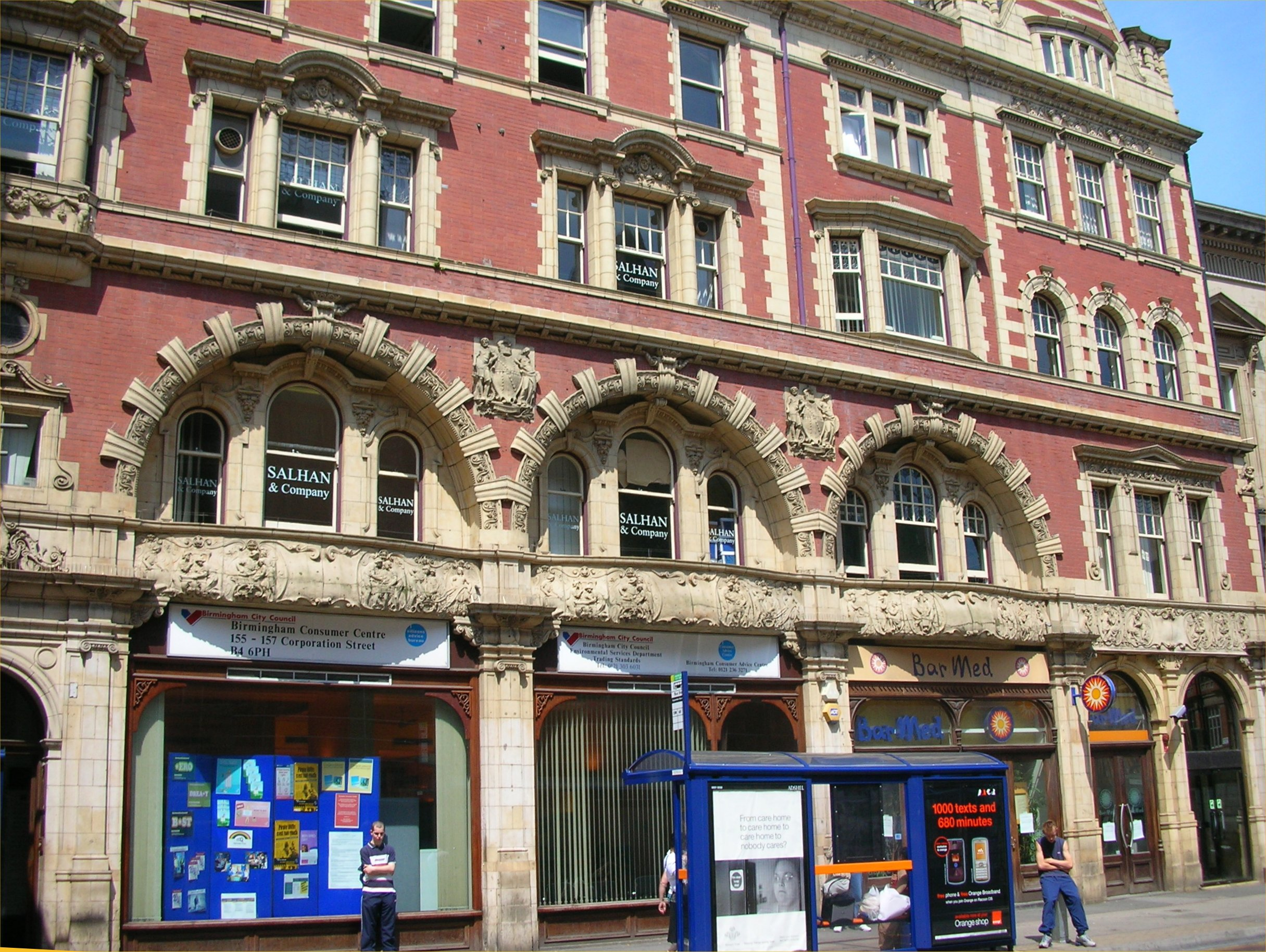
County Buildings (right hand half was the restaurant)

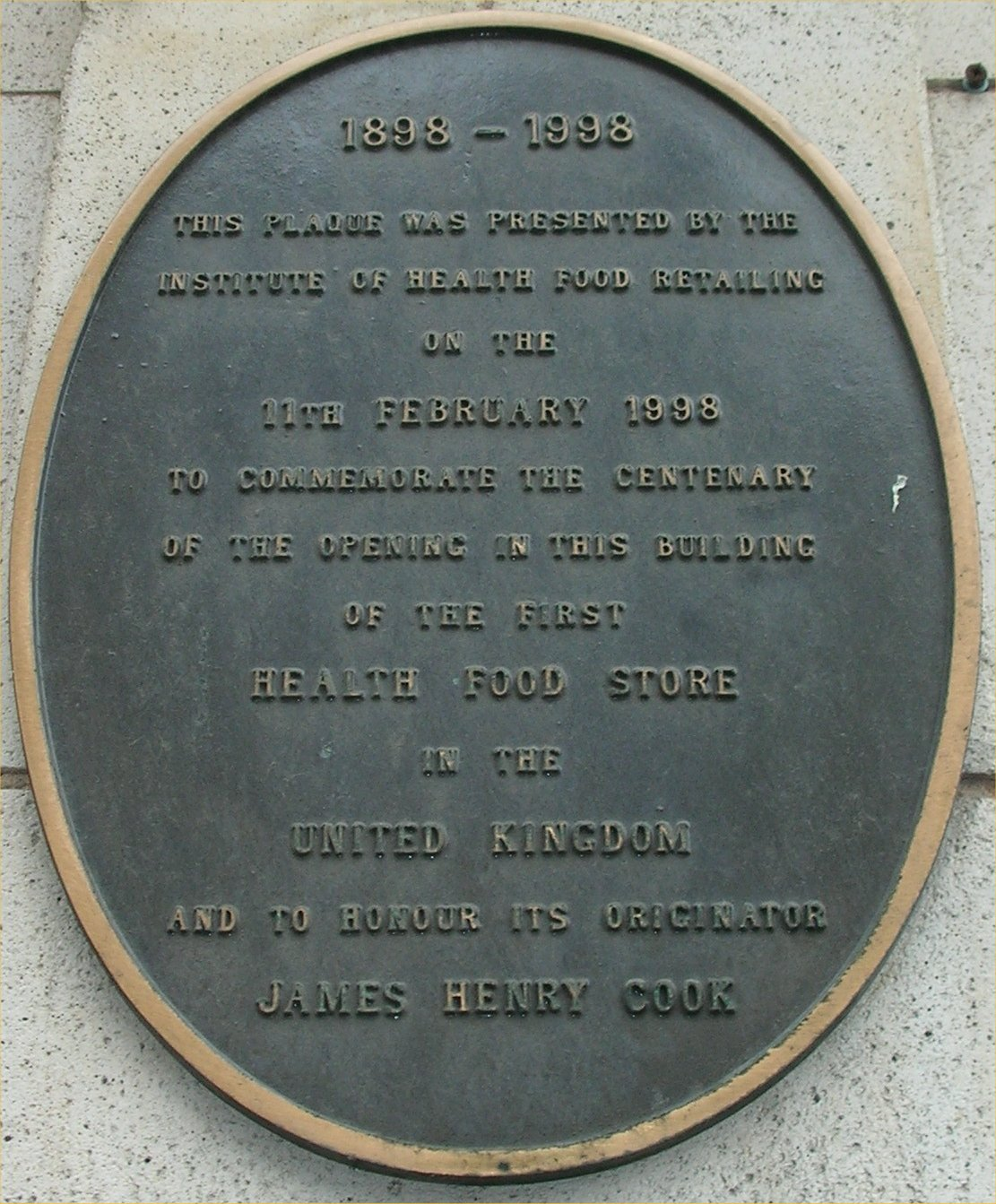
Plaque to James Henry Cook

The Pitman Vegetarian Hotel was a hotel that operated from 1898 until the 1930s in the County Buildings (now Grade II* listed), 159 Corporation Street, Birmingham, England, as an expansion of the Pitman Vegetarian Restaurant established in 1896 on the same site.

== History ==
In 1896, the Murdoch Chambers & Pitman Building was built by J. Crouch and E. Butler for Dean's Furniture and the Pitman Vegetarian Restaurant. In 1898, the restaurant expanded into the Pitman Vegetarian Hotel.

The manager was James Henry Cook. According to his daughter, Kathleen Keleny, it was named after Sir Isaac Pitman, then vice-president of the Vegetarian Society. It was still operating in the 1930s.

After the Second World War, Pitman Building's warren of rooms housed Chest Xray, and various voluntary organisations under the aegis of Birmingham Voluntary Service Council, and its General Secretary Michael C Matcham, including Citizens Advice Bureau, Visiting Service for Old People, Personal Service Committee (administering SSAFA funds), Byv, Adventure Camps, Spode Holidays, Rubella playschemes, Lee Bank Saturday playscheme.

In 2023, MP DevCo, a joint venture between developers Regal Property Group and Trigram Properties, bought the building from the city council to build a 156-bedroom hotel the property owners estimated to open in 2025.

== Pitman Health Food Co. ==
The same proprietor ran the Pitman Health Food Co. (also called Pitman Reform Food Stores) at Aston Brook Street, Birmingham, advertising in 1909 as "The Largest Health Food Dealers in the World". Selling direct and by mail order, it manufactured meat-free products including Pitman Sea-Side Paste, Pitman Savoury Nut Meat, Nuto Cream, Brazose Meat, Vigar Extract, Vegsal Soups and Fruitarian Cakes and wafers. It also sold cooking utensils such as the Pitman Steam Cooker, a multilevel boiler and steamer.

Mahatma Gandhi is known to have received jars of Nuto Cream and Nuto Cream Soup from the company.

== See also ==
- Food and drink in Birmingham
- List of vegetarian and vegan restaurants
