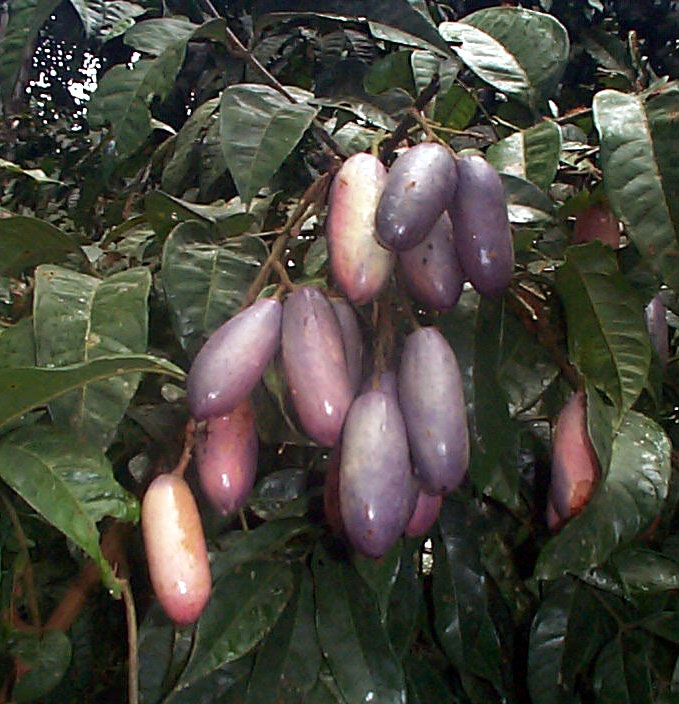
- Fruit of Dacryodes edulis

Scientific classification
- Kingdom: Plantae
- Clade: Tracheophytes
- Clade: Angiosperms
- Clade: Eudicots
- Clade: Rosids
- Order: Sapindales
- Family: Burseraceae
- Genus: Dacryodes; Vahl

Species
- See text

= Dacryodes =

Genus of flowering plants

Dacryodes is a genus of about 60 species of trees in the family Burseraceae. The generic name is from the Greek dakruon meaning "tear(drop)", referring to how resin droplets form on the bark surface.

== Description ==
Dacryodes species grow as shrubs to medium-sized trees. Their bark is smooth to scaly with pale sapwood. Flowers are unisexual. The fruits feature a fleshy and thick pericarp. The fruit of D. rostrata is considered edible in Borneo.

== Distribution and habitat ==
Dacryodes species grow naturally in tropical forests of the Americas, Africa and Asia. The habitats range from lowland to submontane forests from sea-level to 1,500 metres (5,000 ft) elevation.

== Species ==
As of May 2014 The Plant List recognises 63 accepted species (including infraspecific names):

- Dacryodes acutipyrena Cuatrec.
- Dacryodes bampsiana Pierlot
- Dacryodes belemensis Cuatrec.
- Dacryodes breviracemosa Kalkman
- Dacryodes buettneri (Engl.) H.J.Lam
- Dacryodes camerunensis Onana
- Dacryodes chimantensis Steyerm. & Maguire
- Dacryodes colombiana Cuatrec.
- Dacryodes costanensis Steyerm.
- Dacryodes costata (A.W.Benn.) H.J.Lam
- Dacryodes crassipes Kalkman
- Dacryodes cupularis Cuatrec.
- Dacryodes cuspidata (Cuatrec.) Daly
- Dacryodes dungii Than & Yakovlev
- Dacryodes ebatom Aubrév. & Pellegr.
- Dacryodes edilsonii Daly
- Dacryodes edulis (G.Don) H.J.Lam
- Dacryodes elmeri H.J.Lam
- Dacryodes excelsa Vahl
- Dacryodes expansa (Ridl.) H.J.Lam
- Dacryodes glabra (Steyerm.) Cuatrec.
- Dacryodes granatensis Cuatrec.
- Dacryodes heterotricha (Pellegr.) H.J.Lam
- Dacryodes hopkinsii D.C. Daly
- Dacryodes igaganga Aubrév. & Pellegr.
- Dacryodes incurvata (Engl.) H.J.Lam
- Dacryodes kingii (Engl.) Kalkman
- Dacryodes klaineana (Pierre) H.J.Lam
- Dacryodes kostermansii Kalkman
- Dacryodes kukachkana L.O.Williams
- Dacryodes laxa (A.W.Benn.) H.J.Lam
- Dacryodes le-testui (Pellegr.) H.J.Lam
- Dacryodes ledermannii (Engl.) H.J.Lam
- Dacryodes leonardiana Pierlot
- Dacryodes longifolia (King) H.J.Lam
- Dacryodes macrocarpa (King) H.J.Lam
- Dacryodes macrophylla (Oliv.) H.J.Lam
- Dacryodes microcarpa Cuatrec.
- Dacryodes multijuga Leenh.
- Dacryodes negrensis Daly & M.C.Martínez
- Dacryodes nervosa (H.J.Lam) Leenh.
- Dacryodes nitens Cuatrec.
- Dacryodes normandii Aubrév. & Pellegr.
- Dacryodes occidentalis Cuatrec.
- Dacryodes olivifera Cuatrec.
- Dacryodes osika (Guillaumin) H.J.Lam
- Dacryodes papuana Husson
- Dacryodes paraensis Cuatrec.
- Dacryodes patentinervia (Leenh.) P.S.Ashton
- Dacryodes peruviana (Loes.) H.J.Lam
- Dacryodes puberula (A.W.Benn.) H.J.Lam
- Dacryodes pubescens (Vermoesen) H.J.Lam
- Dacryodes roraimensis Cuatrec.
- Dacryodes rostrata (Blume) H.J.Lam
- Dacryodes rubiginosa (A.W.Benn.) H.J.Lam
- Dacryodes rugosa (Blume) H.J.Lam
  - var. virgata (Blume) H.J.Lam
- Dacryodes sclerophylla Cuatrec.
- Dacryodes steyermarkii Sandwith
- Dacryodes tessmannii (Engl.) H.J.Lam
- Dacryodes trapnellii Onana
- Dacryodes trinitensis Sandwith
- Dacryodes villiersiana Onana
