= Dacryodes klaineana =

Scientific classification
- Kingdom: Plantae
- Clade: Tracheophytes
- Clade: Angiosperms
- Clade: Eudicots
- Clade: Rosids
- Order: Sapindales
- Family: Burseraceae
- Genus: Dacryodes
- Species: D. klaineana

Binomial name
- Dacryodes klaineana (Pierre) H.J.Lam

Species of plant

Dacryodes klaineana is an evergreen perennial tree within the Burseraceae family. It is locally called Monkey plum and African cherry fruit as a result of its edible pulp.

== Description ==
The species is capable of growing up 25 meters tall and reaching 60 cm in diameter. Leaves, alternate arrangement, imparipinnately compound, between 2 - 4 pairs of leaflets per pinnae, younger trees tend to have more pairs of leaflets; petiole with a size range between 2.5 x 6.5 cm long, glabrous lamina. Leaf-blade: narrowly elliptic to narrowly ovate, 4.5 x 18 cm long and 2 x 6.5 cm wide, petiolules of the terminal leaflet slightly longer while those of the lower pairs slightly shorter than others and also with shorter leaflets. Flowers, pale creamy corolla. Fruit, ovoid berry, pointed at the top and orange when ripe with edible pulp.

== Distribution ==
Occurs in West Tropical Africa and in parts Central Africa. Trades under the name Adjouaba.

== Uses ==
Traditional healers use root extracts to treat skin diseases while leaf is used as part of a process to treat painful menstruation.
