= Dacryodes elmeri =

Conservation status
- Vulnerable (IUCN 2.3)

Scientific classification
- Kingdom: Plantae
- Clade: Tracheophytes
- Clade: Angiosperms
- Clade: Eudicots
- Clade: Rosids
- Order: Sapindales
- Family: Burseraceae
- Genus: Dacryodes
- Species: D. elmeri

Binomial name
- Dacryodes elmeri H.J.Lam

Species of tree

Dacryodes elmeri is a species of tree in the family Burseraceae. It is named for the American botanist Adolph Elmer.

== Description ==
Dacryodes elmeri has a trunk diameter of up to 75 centimetres (30 in). The fruits are ovoid and measure up to 4.7 cm (2 in) long.

== Distribution and habitat ==
Dacryodes elmeri is endemic to Borneo and is very uncommon. Its habitat is lowland forests.
