= Dacryodes rugosa var. virgata =

Scientific classification
- Kingdom: Plantae
- Clade: Embryophytes
- Clade: Tracheophytes
- Clade: Angiosperms
- Clade: Eudicots
- Clade: Rosids
- Order: Sapindales
- Family: Burseraceae
- Genus: Dacryodes
- Species: D. rugosa
- Variety: D. r. var. virgata

Trinomial name
- Dacryodes rugosa var. virgata (Blume) H.J.Lam

Variety of tree

Dacryodes rugosa var. virgata is a tree in the family Burseraceae.

== Distribution ==
Dacryodes rugosa var. virgata grows widely in Malaysian Borneo's Sarawak and Sabah states. It is also found in Indonesia's Kalimantan region on Borneo.
