= Dacryodes longifolia =

Conservation status
- Least Concern (IUCN 3.1)

Scientific classification
- Kingdom: Plantae
- Clade: Tracheophytes
- Clade: Angiosperms
- Clade: Eudicots
- Clade: Rosids
- Order: Sapindales
- Family: Burseraceae
- Genus: Dacryodes
- Species: D. longifolia

Binomial name
- Dacryodes longifolia (King) H.J.Lam

Synonyms
- Santiria longifolia King; Dacryodes longifolia var. penangensis (Ridl.) H.J.Lam; Curtisina penangensis Ridl.

Species of tree

Dacryodes longifolia is a species of tree in the family Burseraceae. The specific epithet longifolia is from the Latin meaning 'long leaf'.

== Description ==
Dacryodes longifolia grows up to 40 metres (130 ft) tall. The bark is dark grey and smooth. The flowers are white. The ellipsoid fruits measure up to 3.5 cm (1 in) long.

== Distribution and habitat ==
Dacryodes longifolia is native to Sumatra, Peninsular Malaysia, Borneo and the Philippines. Its habitat is in lowland to submontane forests, from sea level to 1,500 metres (5,000 ft) altitude.
