= Dacryodes incurvata =

Conservation status
- Least Concern (IUCN 3.1)

Scientific classification
- Kingdom: Plantae
- Clade: Tracheophytes
- Clade: Angiosperms
- Clade: Eudicots
- Clade: Rosids
- Order: Sapindales
- Family: Burseraceae
- Genus: Dacryodes
- Species: D. incurvata

Binomial name
- Dacryodes incurvata (Engl.) H.J.Lam

Synonyms
- Canarium angulatum Ridl.; Canarium incurvatum Engl.; Canarium nitens Merr.; Dacryodes angulata (Ridl.) H.J.Lam

Species of tree

Dacryodes incurvata is a tree in the family Burseraceae. The specific epithet incurvata is from the Latin meaning 'bending inward', referring to the leaflet margin.

== Description ==
Dacryodes incurvata grows up to 35 metres (110 ft) tall with a trunk diameter of up to 30 centimetres (12 in). The bark is grey-brown and smooth. The ellipsoid or ovoid fruits ripen yellow then purplish and measure up to 3 cm (1 in) long.

== Distribution and habitat ==
Dacryodes incurvata grows naturally in Sumatra, Peninsular Malaysia, Borneo and the Philippines. Its habitat is mixed dipterocarp forests from sea-level to 860 metres (2,800 ft) altitude, or occasionally in peat swamp forests.
