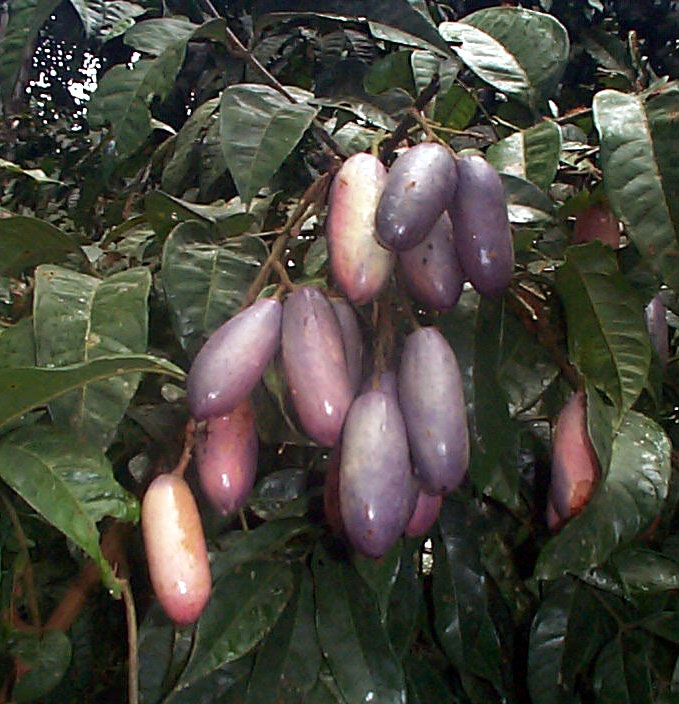

Scientific classification
- Kingdom: Plantae
- Clade: Tracheophytes
- Clade: Angiosperms
- Clade: Eudicots
- Clade: Rosids
- Order: Sapindales
- Family: Burseraceae
- Genus: Dacryodes
- Species: D. edulis

Binomial name
- Dacryodes edulis H.J. Lam
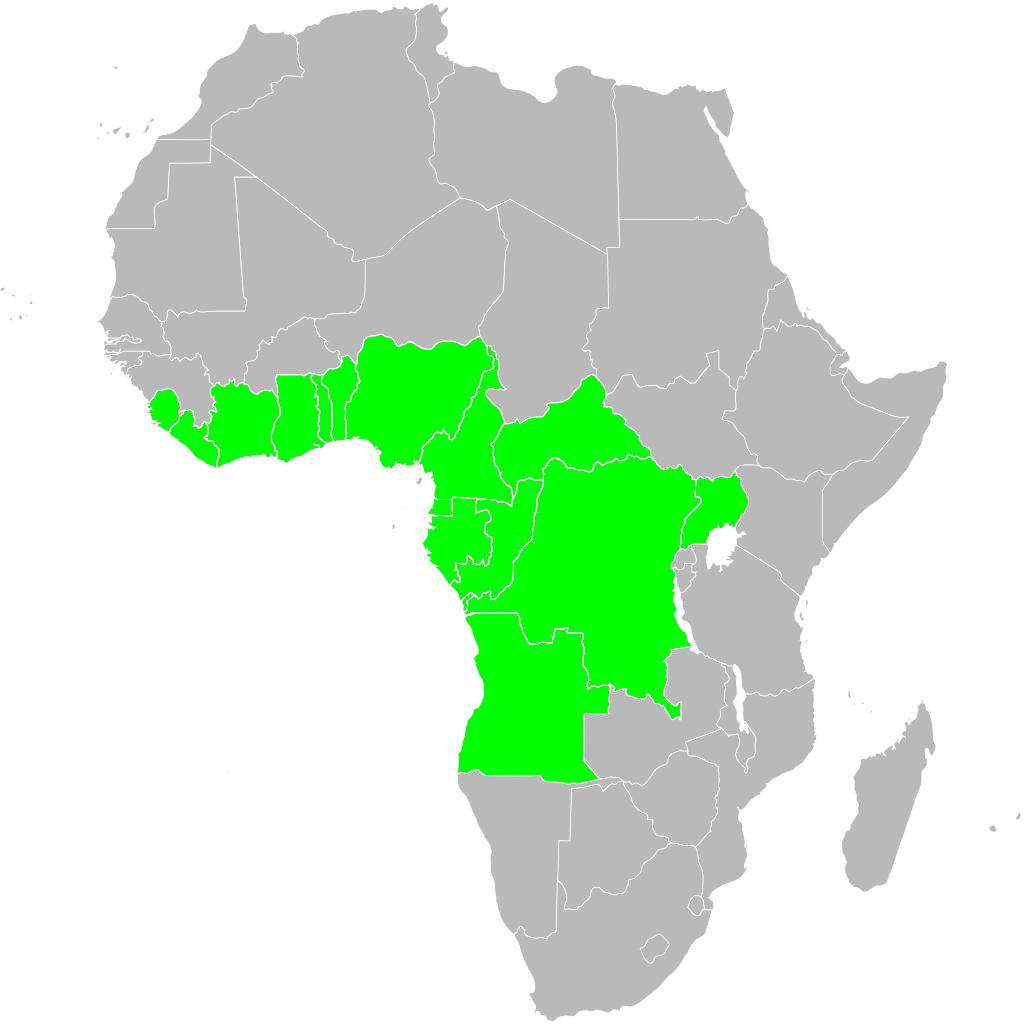
- Native distribution of the Safou

Synonyms
- Canarium edule; Canarium saphu; Pachylobus edulis; Pachylobus saphu

= Dacryodes edulis =

Species of tree

Dacryodes edulis is a species of fruit tree in the family Burseraceae native to west-central Sub-Saharan Africa, known primarily for its edible fruit, which is both gathered from the wild and grown on plantations. Its various regional common names include safou (Republic of the Congo, Democratic Republic of the Congo and Angola), messa, plum (Cameroon), atanga (Equatorial Guinea and Gabon), ube, elumi/rukuki (Nigeria), African pear, bush pear, African plum, nsafu, bush butter tree, and butterfruit, among others.

== Description ==
Dacryodes edulis is an evergreen tree which can grow to a height of 18–40 meters in wild forests but seldom exceeds 12 meters when cultivated on plantations. It has a relatively short trunk and a deep, dense crown. The bark is pale grey with a rough texture due to droplets of resin. The leaves are compound with 5–8 pairs of leaflets and their upper surface is glossy. The flowers are yellow, about 5 mm in diameter, and arranged in a large inflorescence. The fruit is an ellipsoidal drupe which varies in length from 4 to 12 cm. The skin of the fruit is dark blue or violet, whereas the flesh is pale to light green. The tree flowers at the beginning of the rainy season and bears fruit between two and five months after flowering. There are two recognized variants of Dacryodes edulis: D. e. var. edulis and D. e. var. parvicarpa. The fruit of the edulis variety is larger and the tree has stout, ascending branches. The parvicarpa variety has smaller fruit and slender, drooping branches.

== Habitat and distribution ==
D. edulis (Safou) prefers shady, humid tropical forests in the wild. However, it adapts well to variations in soil type, humidity, temperature and day length. It therefore has a very large natural range, extending from Angola in the south to Nigeria and Sierra Leone in the northwest and Uganda in the northeast. It is also cultivated in Malaysia.

== Oil composition ==
The oil of D. edulis fruits is a rich source of fatty acids and triglycerides. Though the fruits of two different cultivars of D. edulis (cultivars 1 and 2, grown in Cameroon) differed significantly in mass, length, thickness of pulp and mass of kernel, the fruit pulp contained similar amounts of oil (64.7 and 62 percent in cultivars 1 and 2, respectively, with oil:fruit ratios of 1:4 and 1:54, respectively). The fatty acid (palmitic, oleic, stearic, linolenic and linoleic acids) and triglyceride compositions of the oils of both cultivars were also similar, although cultivar 1 was richer in palmitolino-olein (18.5 compared with 14.1 percent) and cultivar 2 was richer in dipalmito-olein (24.6 compared with 16.2 percent).

== Uses ==
The value of D. edulis to humans comes primarily from its use as a food source. It has the potential to improve nutrition, boost food security, foster rural development and support sustainable landcare.

=== Fruit ===
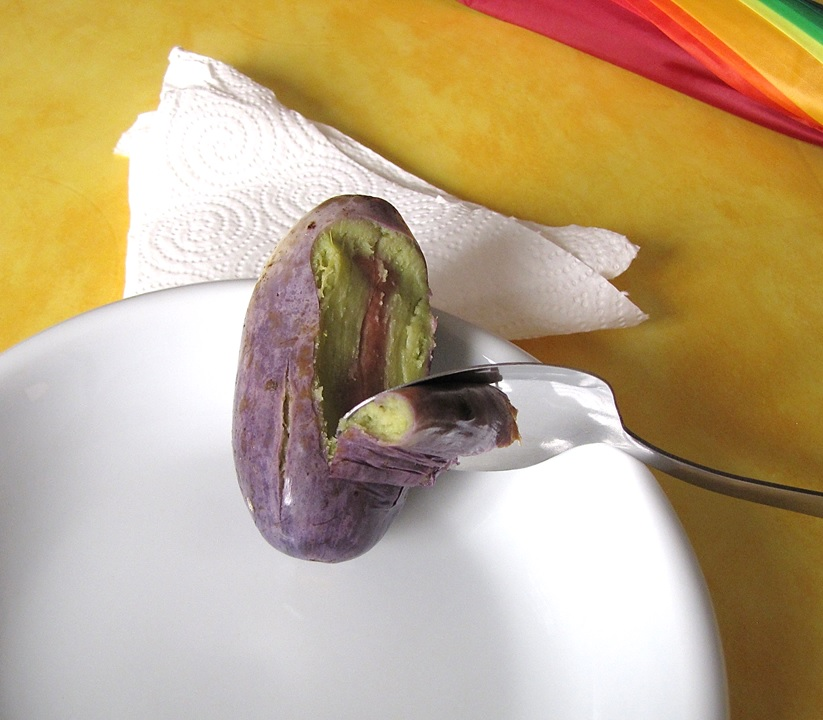
Nsafu is the softened, scraped fruit of Dacryodes edulis, also known as safoutier, African plum or pear, and butterfruit

The main use of D. edulis is its fruit, which can be eaten either raw, cooked in salt water or roasted. The cooked flesh of the fruit has a texture similar to butter and is often eaten on bread. The pulp contains 48% oil, and a plantation can produce 7–8 tons of oil per hectare. The fat content of this fruit is much higher than in fruits such as apples, guava, and pawpaw. It is also rich in minerals including potassium, zinc, iron, copper, and selenium, as well as beta-carotene. The kernel can be used as fodder for sheep or goats, and the flowers are useful in apiculture.

=== Timber ===
The wood of D. edulis is elastic and greyish-white to pinkish. It is commonly shaped for use in tool handles and occasionally for mortars, and is suitable for carpentry.

=== Seed ===
The seed of Dacryodes edulis is rich in different proportions of carbohydrates, proteins, and crude fibres, and contains appreciable amounts of potassium, calcium, magnesium and phosphorus. It is also rich in essential amino acids such as lysine, phenylalanine, leucine, and isoleucine. It contain a considerable concentration of fatty acids such as palmitic acids, oleic acids, and linoleic acids. Physicochemical analysis suggests that the seed may have valuable functional attributes of industrial interest. The important natural product gallic acid is found in significant quantities in the seed of D. edulis. The seeds have also been reported to have vasomodulatory properties.

=== Medicinal ===
The tree is also a source of many herbal medicines. It has long been used in the traditional medicine of some African countries to treat various ailments such as wounds, skin diseases, dysentery, and fever. The extracts and secondary metabolites have been found to show antimicrobial and antioxidant activity. A wide range of chemical constituents such as terpenes, flavonoids, tannins, alkaloids, and saponins have been isolated from the plant.

=== Other uses ===
The resin is sometimes burnt for lighting or used as a glue. The tree is often used as an ornamental plant and is known to improve soil quality by providing large quantities of biomass.

== Etymology ==
The name of the genus comes from the Greek word for tears, dakruon. This is a reference to the numerous resin droplets frequently found on the bark surface of species belonging to this genus. The species name edulis means edible.
