= William Tallack =

English prison reformer and writer (1831–1908)

William Tallack (1831–1908) was an English prison reformer and writer.

== Life ==
Born at St Austell, Cornwall, on 15 June 1831, he was son of Thomas Tallack (1801–65) and his wife Hannah (1800–76), daughter of Samuel Bowden, members of the Society of Friends. He was educated at Sidcot School (1842–5), and the Founders' College, Yorkshire (1852–4). He spent time teaching (1845–52 and 1855–8), but a friendship with the Quaker philanthropist Peter Bedford (1780–1864) determined his later career.

In 1863 Tallack became secretary to the Society for the Abolition of Capital Punishment, exchanging this in 1866 for the same post in the Howard Association, which he held till 31 December 1901. As an activist for penal reform, he visited not only the continent of Europe, but Egypt, Australia, Tasmania, Canada, and the United States. He advocated in particular for more prison visitors, and lecturers.

Tallack was one of the many critics of the prison administrator Edmund Frederick Du Cane, who included the Home Secretary H. H. Asquith and the prison chaplain William Douglas Morrison, but also found some emollient words for him, in 1894. His successor at the Howard Association at the end of 1901 was Edward Grubb.

Around 1868, Tallack also started to work for the Peace Society. There he assisted Henry Richard, its secretary, and helped publish the Herald of Peace. He came onto the executive, where he encountered Leone Levi. In fact Leone and Tallack were soon to disagree, in 1871, on the issue of "reserve armies" that could enforce international arbitration, which Leone would not countenance.

Tallack died at 61 Clapton Common on 25 September 1908, and was buried in the Friends' cemetery, Winchmore Hill, Middlesex.

== Works ==
Tallack's religious writings and correspondence present a liberal type of evangelical religion, with broad sympathies. The Times, to which he contributed, in an obituary notice spoke of his style as "discursive and somewhat confused". His Penological and Preventive Principles (1888, 2nd edit. 1896) was considered a standard work. It argued for prisons that would prevent crime, and give offenders better treatment. Tallack found the state lacking in support for the concept of moral agency.

Tallack's other books included:

- Malta under the Phenicians, Knights and English, 1861.
- Friendly Sketches in America, 1861 (noticed in John Paget's Paradoxes and Puzzles, 1874, 405-7).
- Peter Bedford, the Spitalfields Philanthropist, 1865; 2nd edit. 1892.
- A Common Sense Course for Diminishing the Evils of War, 1867.
- Thomas Shillitoe, the Quaker Missionary and Temperance Pioneer, 1867.
- George Fox, the Friends and the Early Baptists, 1868.
- Humanity and Humanitarianism ... Prison Systems, 1871.
- Defects of the Criminal System and Penal Legislation, 1872 (circulated by the Howard Association).
- Christ's Deity and Beneficent Reserve, 1873.
- India, its Peace and Progress, 1877.
- Reparation to the Injured; and the rights of the victims of crime to compensation (1900)
- Howard Letters and Memories, 1905 (autobiographical).

A fairly complete bibliography of Tallack's writings to 1882 (including magazine articles) was in Bibliotheca Cornubiensis (1874–82). His advocacy found expression in tracts, addresses, flyleaves, and articles in periodicals.

== Family ==
He married on 18 July 1867, at Stoke Newington, Augusta Mary (born 28 December 1844, died 21 January 1904), daughter of John Hallam Catlin. They had several children.

== Notes ==
Attribution

This article incorporates text from a publication now in the public domain: Lee, Sidney, ed. (1912). "Tallack, William". Dictionary of National Biography (2nd supplement). Vol. 3. London: Smith, Elder & Co.
