= Dacryodes macrocarpa =

Scientific classification
- Kingdom: Plantae
- Clade: Tracheophytes
- Clade: Angiosperms
- Clade: Eudicots
- Clade: Rosids
- Order: Sapindales
- Family: Burseraceae
- Genus: Dacryodes
- Species: D. macrocarpa

Binomial name
- Dacryodes macrocarpa (King) H.J.Lam

Species of tree

Dacryodes macrocarpa is a tree in the family Burseraceae. The specific epithet macrocarpa is from the Greek meaning 'large fruit'.

== Description ==
Dacryodes macrocarpa grows as a medium-sized to tall tree. The bark is reddish brown and cracked. The ovoid or ellipsoid fruits measure up to 4 cm (1.6 in) long.

== Distribution and habitat ==
Dacryodes macrocarpa grows naturally in Sumatra, Peninsular Malaysia and Borneo. Its habitat is coastal and swamp forests.
