= Dacryodes expansa =

Conservation status
- Vulnerable (IUCN 2.3)

Scientific classification
- Kingdom: Plantae
- Clade: Tracheophytes
- Clade: Angiosperms
- Clade: Eudicots
- Clade: Rosids
- Order: Sapindales
- Family: Burseraceae
- Genus: Dacryodes
- Species: D. expansa

Binomial name
- Dacryodes expansa (Ridl.) H.J.Lam

Species of tree

Dacryodes expansa is a tree in the family Burseraceae. The specific epithet expansa is from the Latin meaning 'spread out', referring to the structure of the petals.

== Description ==
Dacryodes expansa grows as a small tree. The buds are reddish brown. The leaves consist of four leaflets.

== Distribution and habitat ==
Dacryodes expansa is endemic to Borneo and is uncommon. Its habitat is lowland forests.
