= Andreas Antona =

Greek-Cypriot chef

- Born: September 1957 (age 68); Cuckfield, West Sussex
- Culinary career
- Rating: Michelin stars
- Current restaurant(s): Simpsons The Cross Purecraft Bar & Kitchen
- Website: www.simpsonsrestaurant.co.uk

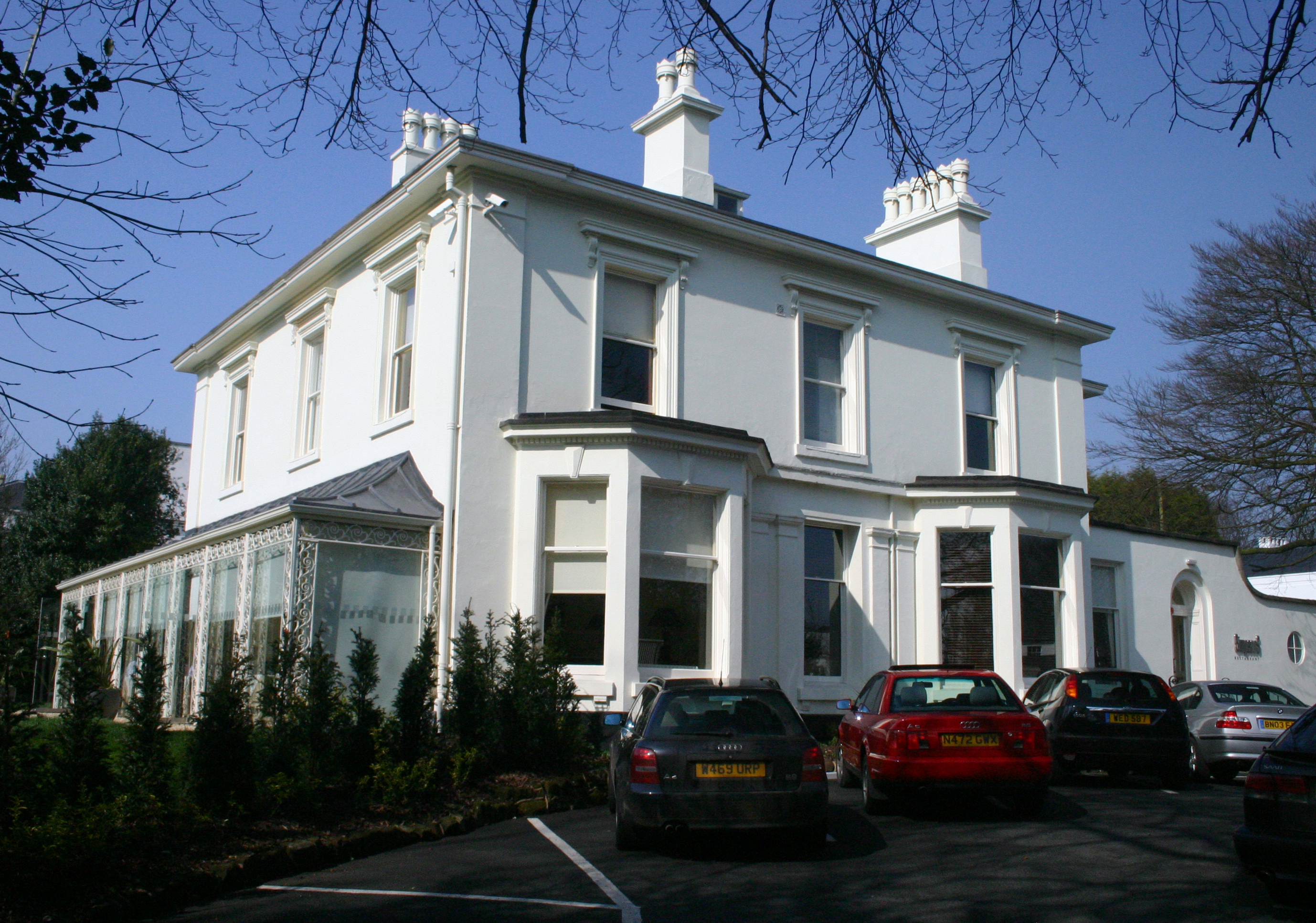
Simpson's restaurant in Edgbaston

Andreas Antona (born in September 1957) is a Greek-Cypriot, British chef and restaurateur. Now the Chef-Patron, and owner, of Simpsons, one of Birmingham's five Michelin starred restaurants, and The Cross in Kenilworth, Warwickshire. Antona was a mentor to several other successful Birmingham chefs early in their careers, including Glynn Purnell, Luke Tipping and Andy Waters, and has been described in The Times as "the godfather of modern Birmingham food".

Antona was born in Cuckfield, West Sussex to a Greek-Cypriot family, and was brought up in Chiswick, London. He trained initially at Ealing Technical College, after which he spent six years working in hotels in Germany and Switzerland – before working under Anton Mosimann at The Dorchester and at the Ritz Hotel. From 1987 he spent three years as Head Chef at Birmingham's Plough and Harrow Hotel, at a time when its restaurant was among the finest in the Midlands.

Antona originally opened Simpsons in Kenilworth, Warwickshire in September 1993, the restaurant's name being taken from that of the chemists shop owned by his father-in-law that used to occupy the property. Simpsons was awarded a Michelin Star in 1999 and moved to a grade II-listed Georgian villa in Edgbaston, Birmingham in 2004, by which time it had built a European-wide reputation.

Since then, Antona has opened a second restaurant in Kenilworth, The Cross, which was awarded a Michelin Star in 2014 just shortly after opening. Andreas is now part of the team behind Pure Bar & Kitchen in Birmingham.

On the 28th of May 2026 Andreas Antona announced that Simpsons would close, citing the challenging economic climate and three failed attempts to sell the business.
