= Annual Monitor =

The Annual Monitor is a list of British Quakers who died each year, between 1812 and 1919, including well over 20,000 persons. Most entries are basic data: age at death, date of death, names of parents or "widow of ...". Some entries have a "memorial" (sometimes of several pages) giving biographical detail and a strong religious message.

The first issue was published in York by William Alexander (1768–1841), who was editor between 1813 and 1819. The project was initiated by William's wife, Ann Alexander (born Tuke, 1767–1849).

== Editors ==
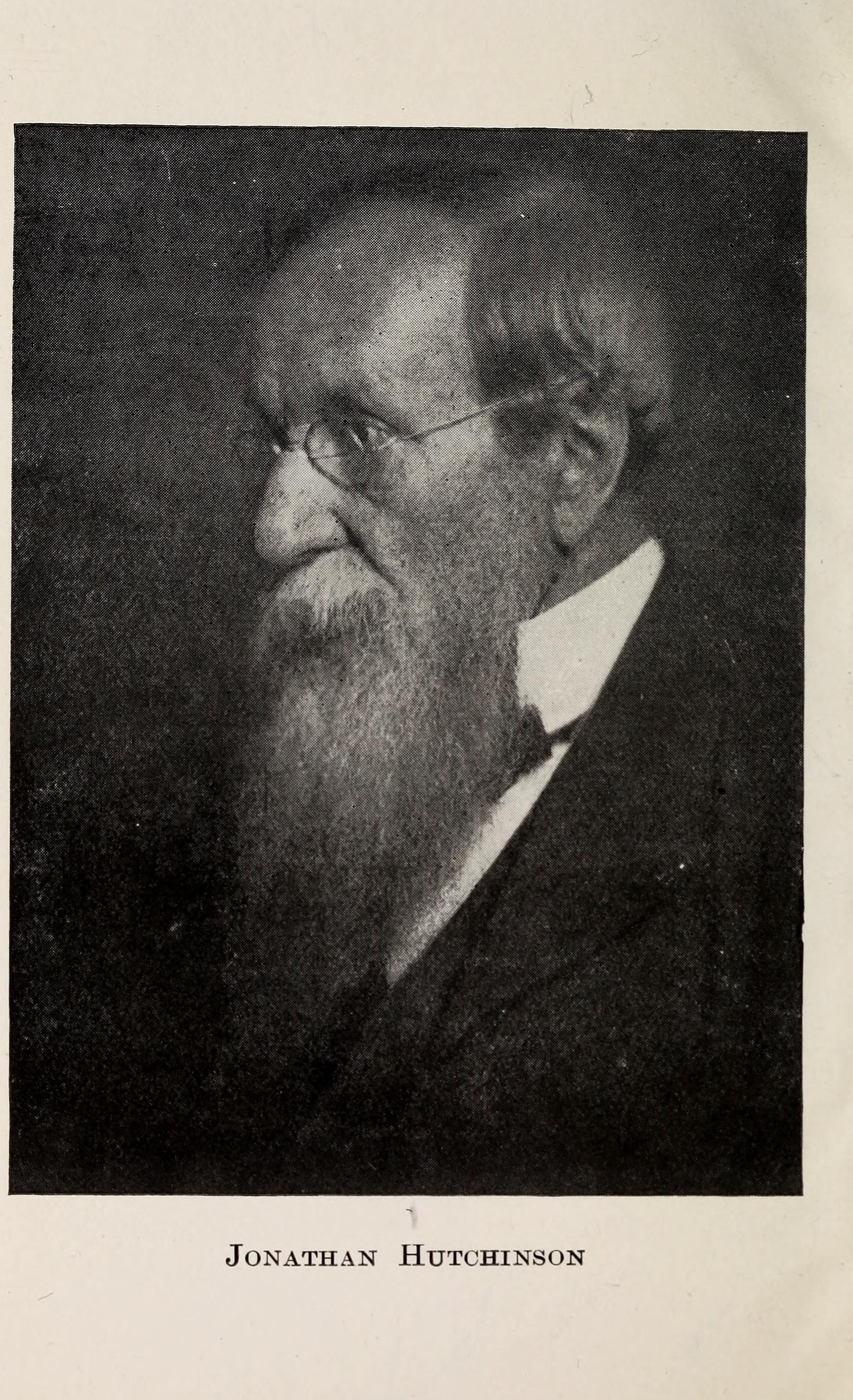
Portrait of surgeon Jonathan Hutchinson in his 1913 obituary in Annual Monitor No. 102

Succeeding editors were:

- William Alexander (1768-1841)
- Sarah Backhouse (1803-1877)
- Samuel Tuke (1784-1857)
- Benjamin Seebohm (1798-1871)
- Esther Seebohm (1798?-1864)
- Joseph Stickney Sewell (1819-1900)
- John Newby (1806-1877)
- William Robinson (1832-1908)
- Francis Arnold Knight (1852-1915)

== Numbering ==
- No. 1-30 (1813-1842);
- New Series No. 1-78 (1843-1919/20)
- New Series. Nos. 67-70 (1909-1912) also issued as Nos. 96-99
- New Series Nos. 71-78 (1913-1920) also issued as Nos. 101-108
- Supplement to No. 22 (1834)

== Indexes ==
Several cumulative indexes were produced, the most comprehensive being Quaker Records: Being an Index to "The Annual Monitor," 1813-1892, edited by Joseph J. Green (available online) and Index 1893-1901 edited by W. Pumphrey

== Title variation ==
Over the years, the title has varied thus:

- The Annual monitor; or, New Letter-case and memorandum book
- The Annual monitor and memorandum book
- The Annual monitor...being an obituary of members of the Society of Friends in Great Britain and Ireland

== Annual Monitor Online ==
The Quaker records Index 1813-1892 by Joseph Green and the following years are available online (at 17 September 2012). Note the year given is the year of publication. The deaths recorded occurred in the previous year:

- Before 1842 - not all yet traced
- 1834-36 v22-24
- 1837-40 v25-28
- 1843 New Series No.1
- No. 1
- 1844 No. 2
- 1845 No. 3
- 1846 No.4
- 1847 No.5
- 1848 No.6
- 1849 No.7
- 1850 No.8
- 1851 No.9
- 1852 No.10
- 1853 No. 11
- 1854 No.12
- 1855 No.13
- 1856 No. 14
- 1857 No.15
- 1858 No.16
- 1859 No.17
- 1860 No. 18
- 1861 No.19
- 1862 No. 20
- 1863 No.21
- 1864 No.22
- 1865 No. 23
- 1866 No. 24
- 1867 No.25
- 1868 No.26
- 1869 No.27
- 1870 No.28
- 1871 No. 29
- 1872 No. 30
- 1873 No.31
- 1874 No.32
- 1875 No.33
- 1876 No.34
- 1877 No.35
- 1878 No.36
- 1879 No.37
- 1880 No.38
- 1881 No.39
- 1882 No.40
- 1883 No.41
- 1884 No.42
- 1885 No.43
- 1886 No.44
- 1887 No. 45
- 1888 no.46
- 1889 No.47
- 1890 No.48
- 1891 No.49
- 1892 No.50
- 1893 No.51
- 1894 No.52
- 1895 No.53
- 1896 No.54
- 1897 No.55
- 1898 No.56
- 1899 No.57
- 1900 - not yet traced
- 1901 No.59
- 1902 No.60
- 1903 No. 61
- 1904 No.62
- 1905 No.63
- 1906 No. 64
- 1907 No.65
- 1908 - not yet traced
- 1909 No.96
- 1910 No. 97
- 1911 No. 98
- 1912 No.99
- 1913 no.101
- 1914 No.102
- 1915 No.103
- 1916 No.104
- 1917 No.105
- 1918 No.106
- 1919 - 1920

== American Annual Monitor ==
An American Annual Monitor was published 1858 to 1863.

== Notes and references ==
=== Sources ===
- Catalogue of the Library of the Religious Society of Friends: Britain Yearly Meeting
- Library of the Religious Society of Friends: Britain Yearly Meeting Subject Guide: Genealogy
- The Internet Archive.
