= Alfred William Bennett =

British botanist and publisher (1833–1902)

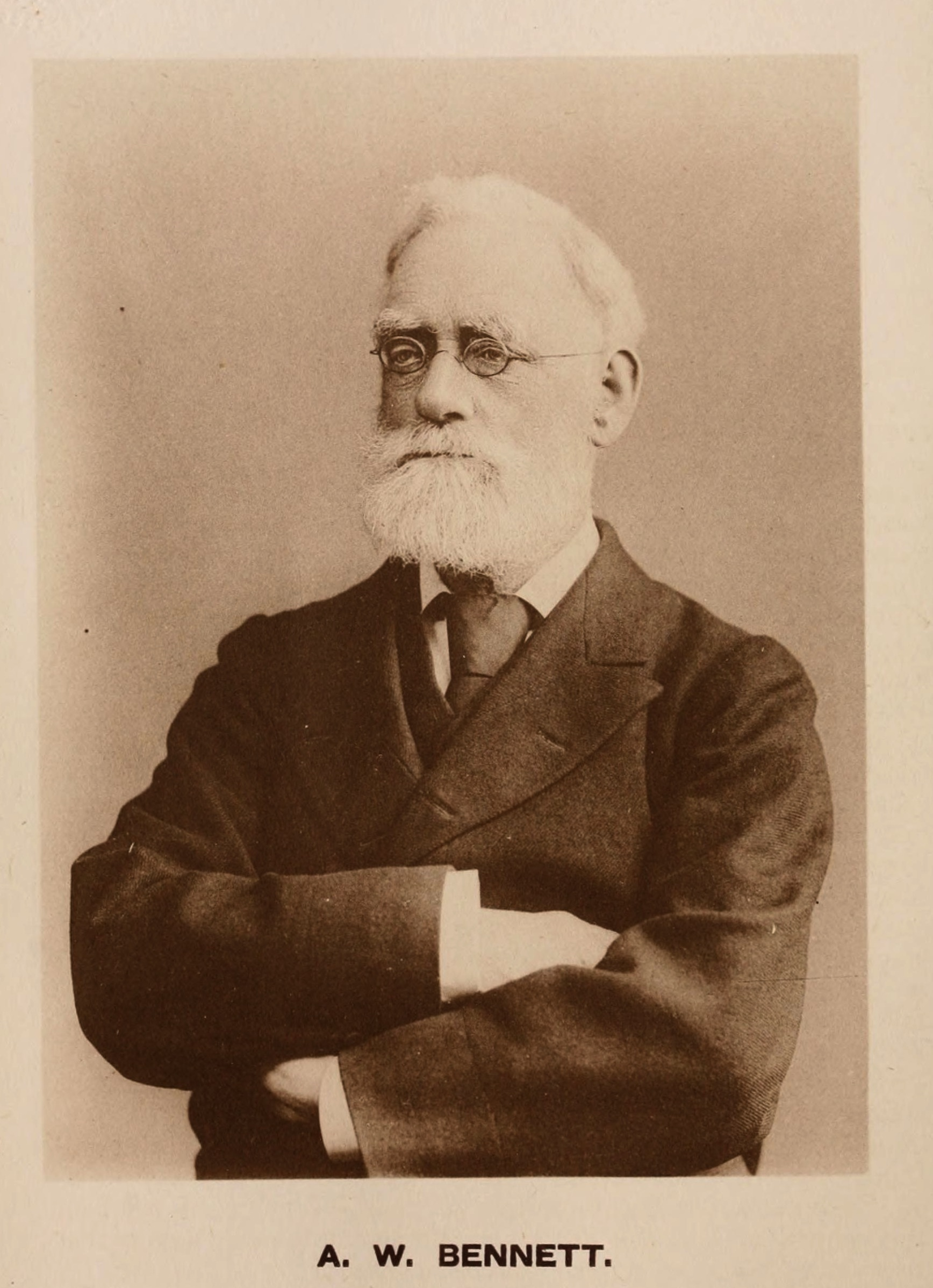
- Born: 24 June 1833; Clapham, Surrey, England
- Died: 23 January 1902 (aged 68); London, England
- Education: University College London
- Scientific career
- Fields: Botany, Publishing, Microscopy
- Workplaces: St Thomas' Hospital, Bedford College
- Author abbrev. (botany): A.W.Benn.

Alfred William Bennett (24 June 1833 – 23 January 1902) was a British botanist and publisher. He was best known for his work on the flora of the Swiss Alps, cryptogams, and the Polygalaceae or Milkwort plant family, as well as his years in the publishing industry.

== Early life ==
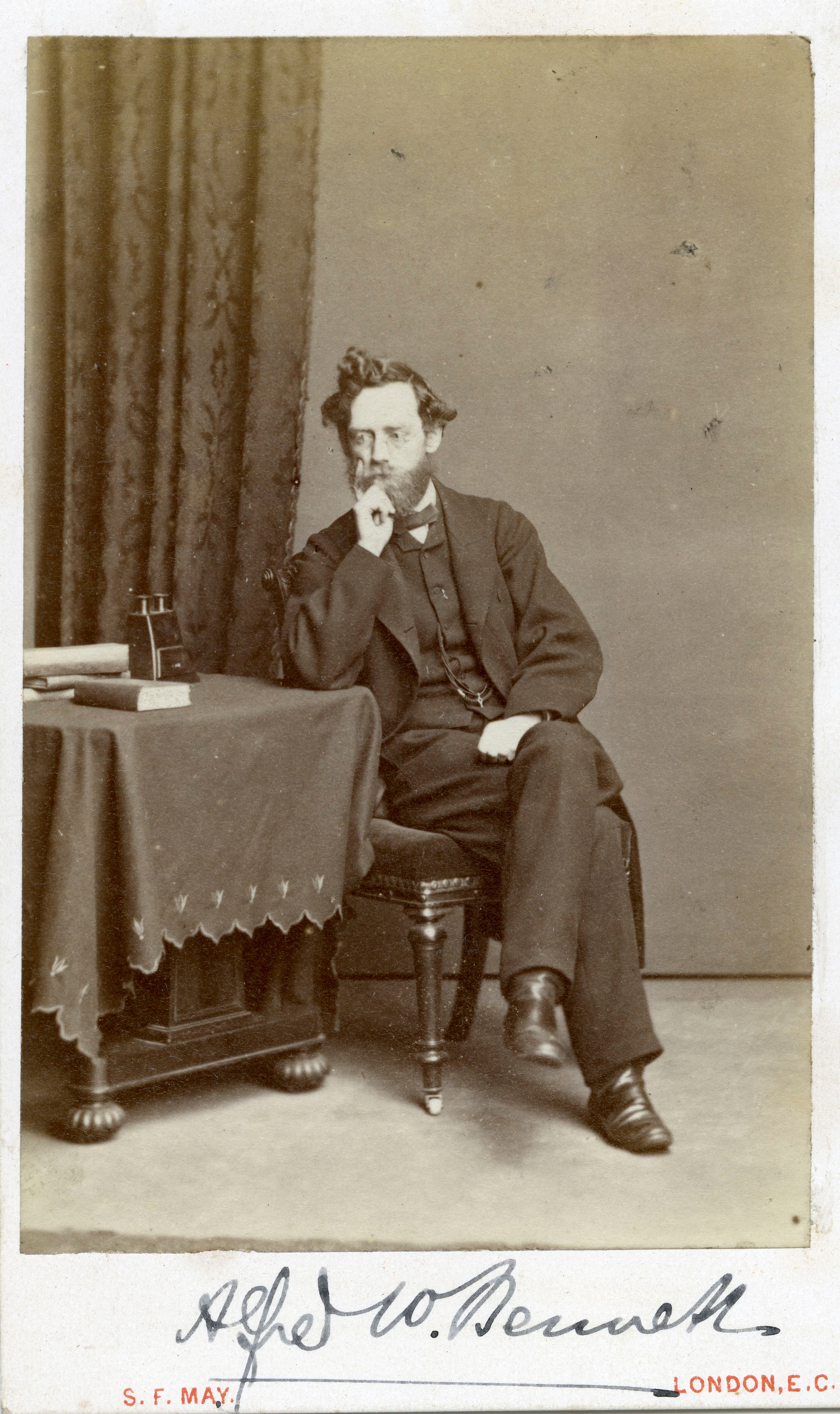
c. 1875

Alfred William Bennett was son of Quakers William Bennett (1804–1873), a successful tea dealer, amateur botanist, and sometime emu breeder, and Elizabeth (Trusted) Bennett (1798–1891), an author of religious books for the Society of Friends. William Bennett also corresponded with biologist Charles Darwin, though he did not accept the latter's theories concerning evolutionary biology. Alfred Bennett, a lifelong believer in evolution unlike his father, would later establish his own correspondence with the noted theorist.

William Bennett took great interest in the education of his children, whom he schooled at home. The elder Bennett was influenced in his ideas of education by the writings of the Swiss philosopher and educational reformer Johann Heinrich Pestalozzi, and in the winter of 1841–1842, he took his family to Switzerland so that his children could study at the Pestalozzian School at Appenzell. It was during this trip that Alfred Bennett learned the German language, a skill that would help him in his future writings on Alpine plant life.

William Bennett also created an environment conducive to the study of the natural sciences for his children. Between 1851 and 1854, he took Alfred and his brother Edward Trusted Bennett (1831–1908) on several walking tours of Wales and the western regions of England, where the boys studied British flora and took extensive notes on their observations. Their father also introduced them to noted entomologists and family friends Edward Newman, Henry Doubleday, and Edward Doubleday.

== Education and publishing ==
Bennett attended University College London, where he received a BA with honours in chemistry and Botany in 1853, an MA in biology in 1855, and a BSc in biology in 1868.

In 1858, he married Katharine Richardson (1835–1892) and turned to publishing as a career, taking over the business at 5, Bishopsgate Without, formerly run by Charles Gilpin and later by William & Frederick G. Cash. While he only spent the next 10 years as a publisher, he worked off and on in various aspects of the industry for the rest of his life. He was the editor and publisher of The Friend, an independent weekly publication for members of the Society of Friends.

He was one of the first publishers to use photographic illustrations; and the first sub-editor of the journal Nature. Additionally, he went on to be the editor of the Journal of the Royal Microscopical Society, the main publication of the Royal Microscopical Society, an institution in which he was a fellow and also served three terms as vice-president.

== Botanical career ==
Between 1871 and 1873, Bennett wrote a series of papers on fertilisation in plants that brought him to the attention of Charles Darwin, who encouraged his efforts. In particular, Bennett clarified many of the processes in flower fertilisation and established core terminology for its description, as well as illuminating how flower structure could facilitate cross-fertilization. Bennett also began to write on Polygalaceae during this time, and he contributed synopses of species within that family for the 1874 publication Flora Brasiliensis and J.D. Hooker's 1872 volume Flora of British India. During a walking tour of Switzerland in 1875, Bennett's interest in the natural world of the Swiss Alps was also rekindled after finding 200 species of flowering plants he had not seen before in the field. This led to his translation of J. Seboth's Alpenpflanzen nach der Natur gemalt as Alpine Plants (1879–84) and work on Austrian scientist K.W. von Dalla Torre's Tourists' Guide to the Flora of the Austrian Alps (1882, 1886), as well as Bennett's own definitive work The Flora of the Alps (1897). He also worked extensively on cryptogams, especially freshwater algae, during the last two decades as a botanist. In 1889, he published A Handbook of Cryptogamic Botany with his coauthor George Robert Milne Murray. His obituary in the Journal of the Royal Microscopical Society calls it his "most valuable original work." Bennett also spent many years as lecturer in botany at St Thomas' Hospital and Bedford College.

== Higher education of women ==
After his retirement from publishing, in 1868, he and his wife opened their house in Park Village East, Regent's Park, for a limited number of ladies coming up to London to study. From this time forward he took a keen interest in the education of women. Upon him personally fell a large share of the effort. On 15 May 1878, University of London Convocation, received an address signed by 1,960 women, asking that the university "throw open all its degrees to women. A.W.Bennett was one of the speakers, named in the Times report of the ensuing debate. After nearly ten years, the campaign was successful in authorising the awarding of degrees to women by the University of London.

== Evolution ==
Bennett accepted that evolution occurred but was a critic of natural selection. In 1870, he wrote a critical paper in the Nature journal entitled The Theory of Natural selection from a Mathematical Point of View. He argued that small random variations could not accumulate in any single direction as the incipient steps of a modification of an organ would be useless to the individual. His arguments were rejected by Alfred Russel Wallace.

In 1871, Bennett endorsed St. George Jackson Mivart criticisms of natural selection and wrote a supportive review of his book On the Genesis of Species. Bennett wrote a review of Charles Darwin's On the Origin of Species in 1872. He praised parts of the book but raised objections to natural selection. He held that it was incompetent to account for the initial stages of mimicry. Darwin wrote to Bennett "I thank you sincerely for your generous review of the last. Edit. of the Origin, more especially as we different so greatly & I quite agree with you that the only way to arrive at the truth is to discuss & freely express all different of opinion." Despite their differences, Bennett wrote a supportive review of Darwin's book Insectivorous Plants and they exchanged friendly letters.

He also wrote a paper that disputed the arguments of Fritz Müller that a protective mimicry in Lepidoptera could be explained by natural selection.

== Death ==
Bennett died suddenly from a heart attack in Oxford Circus while riding home to Regent's Park atop an omnibus. A lifelong Quaker, he is buried in a Quaker burial-ground in Isleworth next to his wife Katharine. The couple was childless.

== Selected writings ==
- Review of the Genus Hydrolea (1870)
- The Theory of Natural Selection from a Mathematical Point of View (1870)
- Review of The Genesis of Species (1871)
- Review of The Origin of Species by Means of Natural Selection (1872)
- On the Medicinal Products of the Indian Simarubeae and Burseraceae (1875)
- Review of the British Species and Subspecies of Polygala (1877)
- On the Structure and the Affinities of Characeae (1878)
- Conspectus Polygalarum Europaearum (1878)
- Polygalae americanae novae vel parum cognitae (1878)
- Reproduction of the Zygnemaceae (1884)
- Freshwater Algae (1887)
- A Handbook of Cryptogamic Botany (1889)
- The Flora of the Alps (1897)

== Bibliography ==
- "Alfred William Bennett" (1902). Proceedings of the Linnean Society of London: One Hundred and Fourteenth Session, pp. 26–27. Retrieved 15 September 2012 from Biodiversity Heritage Library.
- Baker, J.G. (1902). "Obituary: A.W. Bennett." Journal of the Royal Microscopical Society for the Year 1902, pp. 155–157. Retrieved 15 September 2012 from Biodiversity Heritage Library.
- Cleevely, R.J. (2004). "Bennett, Alfred William." Dictionary of Nineteenth-Century British Scientists, Volume 1: pp. 181–182. Bristol, England: Thoemmes Continuum.
- Cleevely, R.J. (2004). "Bennett, Alfred William (1833–1902)." Oxford Dictionary of National Biography. Oxford: Oxford University Press. Online edition. Retrieved 15 September 2012 through a subscription account.
- "Katharine Bennett" (1893). Annual Monitor, No. 51: p. 22. Retrieved 17 September 2012 from Internet Archive.
- S.A.S. (1902). "A.W. Bennett." Nature, 65: p. 321. Retrieved 14 September 2012 from Nature.com.
- Stafleu, Frans A. and Erik A. Mennega (1993). "Bennett, Alfred William." Taxonomic Literature: Supplement II, pp. 70–72. Königstein: Koelz Scientific Books. Retrieved 15 September 2012 from Taxonomic Literature II Online.
