= Incensole =

Names
- IUPAC name (1R,2R,5E,9Z)-1,5,9-trimethyl-12-propan-2-yl-15-oxabicyclo[10.2.1]pentadeca-5,9-dien-2-ol

Identifiers
CAS Number	22419-74-5
3D model (JSmol)	Interactive image
ChemSpider	57579845
PubChem CID	102004667
CompTox Dashboard (EPA)	DTXSID401318606
- InChI: InChI=1S/C20H34O2/c1-15(2)20-12-11-17(4)8-6-7-16(3)9-10-18(21)19(5,22-20)13-14-20/h7,11,15,18,21H,6,8-10,12-14H2,1-5H3/b16-7+,17-11-/t18-,19-,20?/m1/s1 Key: SSBZLMMXFQMHDP-AWBFOCMTSA-N
- SMILES: CC1=CCCC(=CCC2(CCC(O2)(C(CC1)O)C)C(C)C)C

Properties
Chemical formula	C_{20}H_{34}O_{2}
Molar mass	306.490 g·mol^{−1}
Density	1.0±0.1 g/cm3
Boiling point	408.9±45.0 °C at 760 mmHg
Vapor pressure	0.0±2.2 mmHg at 25°C
Refractive index (n_{D})	1.493

Hazards
Flash point	160.7±23.0 °C
- Except where otherwise noted, data are given for materials in their standard state (at 25 °C [77 °F], 100 kPa). Infobox references

Incensole is a C_{20} diterpene alcohol and biomarker for some plants of the Boswellia genus. It, along with its acetate ester incensole acetate, is an abundant component of frankincense, the resin collected from Boswellia trees. Incensole is used archaeologically to assist in identifying trade routes and distinguishing the identity of frankincense from other resins which may have been used together in incense and other salves. Incensole has also been deemed to be an active component in medicinal frankincense.

== History ==
Incensole was first isolated in 1966 at the University of Rome's Institute of Organic Chemistry by S. Corsano and R. Nicoletti while investigating the neutral components of Boswellia carteri resin. There was some controversy as to whether the sample analyzed by S. Corsano and R. Nicoletti was actually from B. carteri and some believed that the original sample was from a B. papyrifera specimen. Further testing done by H. Obermann in 1977 identified an "Eritrea" type B. carteri sample (so named because it originated from the Eritrea region) which displayed incensole levels consistent with those found by Corsano and Nicoletti, but the sample specimen was likely B. papyrifera misidentified as B. carteri. In 2005, incensole was used as a biomarker for frankincense (also known as olibanum) in order to determine the composition of Ancient Egyptian mummification balms and unguents, speaking to its role in studying the history of religion.

== Chemistry ==
Oily in appearance, incensole has low volatility. It can be synthetically prepared from cembrene, a terpenoid, and cembrenol (serratol), its biologic precursor. Diterpenes and terpenoids are classes of biomarkers which are synthesized in plants and have been found in insects, possibly because of accumulation of terpenoids within their diets. Terpenoids have gained special interest due to their potential as anti-inflammatories, chemotherapies, and antiparasitics.

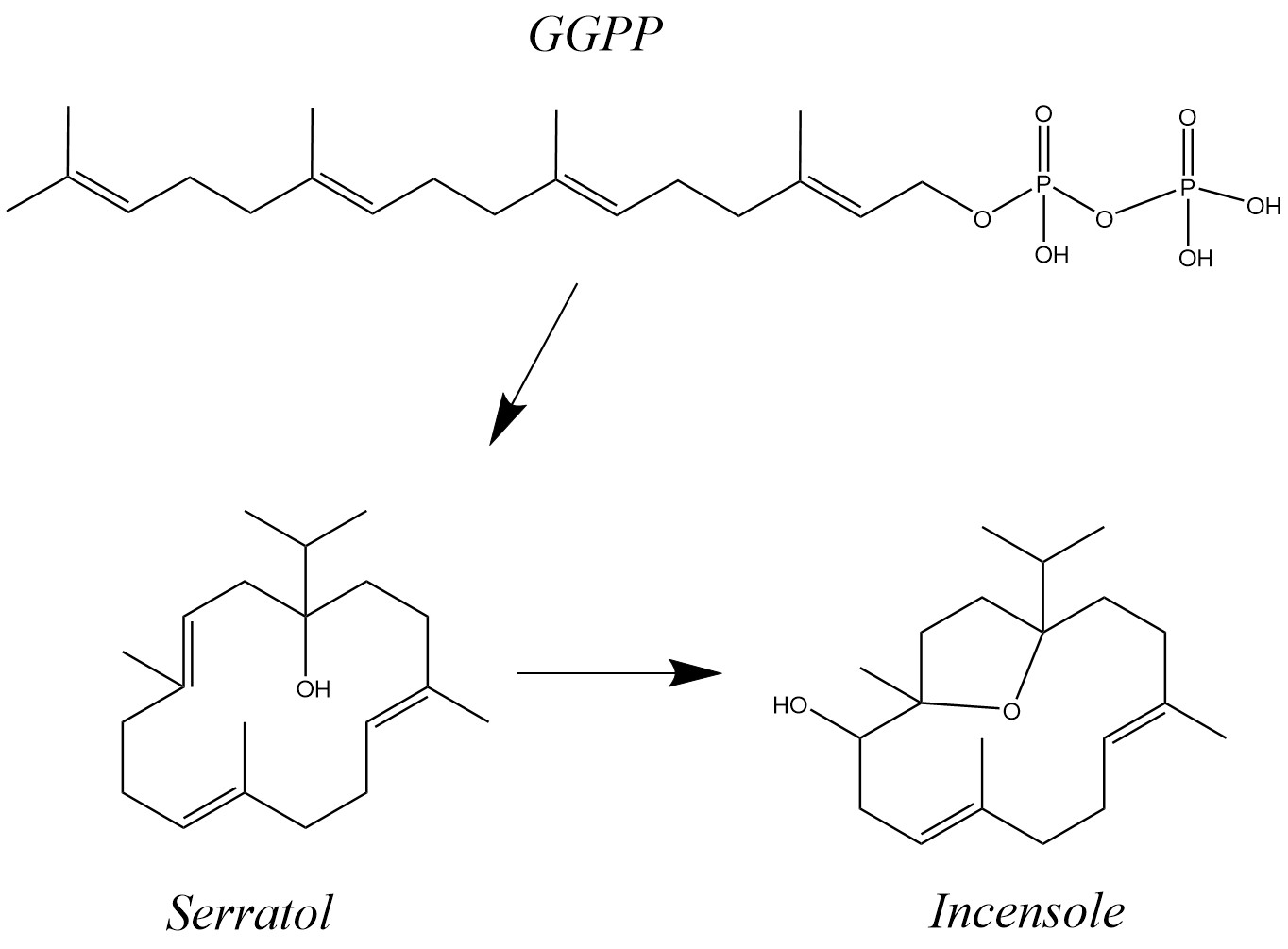
Incensole with its proposed biosynthetic precursors Serratol and GGPP

=== Biosynthetic pathway ===
It has been proposed that incensole is produced in Boswellia plants via serratol from geranylgeranyl pyrophosphate (GGPP), a C_{20} precursor for many metabolic branches such as the chlorophyll, carotenoid, and gibberellin biosynthetic pathways. To begin, GGPP loses its pyrophosphate group enabling it to be 1,14-cyclized to form cembrene after the loss of a proton. Cembrene is then hydrolyzed to form serratol which in turn undergoes epoxidation and intramolecular cyclization to form incensole. Though this has been used to make incensole synthetically, the abundances of incensole, serratol, incensole acetate, and iso-serratol in Boswellia species known to produce incensole are inconsistent with what would be expected if this pathway occurred in situ.

== Sources of Incensole ==
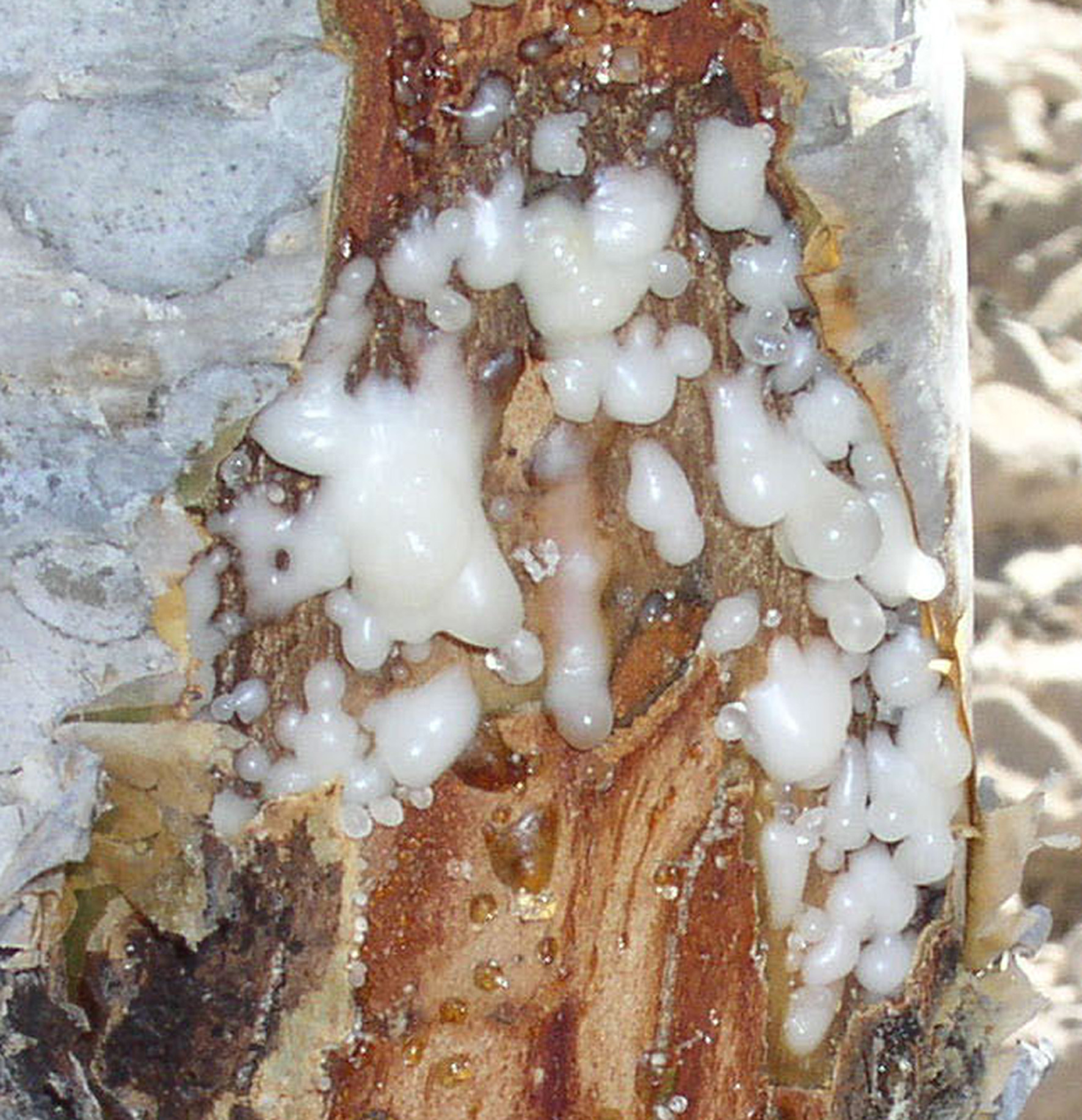
Frankincense resin seeping out of B. sacra trunk

Incensole is mainly found in the resin of Boswellia trees which grow in a region across Northern Africa from Ethiopia to Nigeria. Boswellia trees prefer to grow in arid, stony regions, and cuts to the body of the trees seep frankincense resin which hardens and darkens when exposed to the air. Incensole is a biomarker of frankincense from certain Boswellia species; these species are B. papyrifera, B. occulta, B. carteri, B. sacra, and possibly B. serrata though there are conflicting results as to whether it really produces incensole. B. carteri and B. sacra have been determined to actually be the same species, except that B. carteri is native to Africa while B. sacra is native to South Arabia.

It has also been proposed that incensole and incensole acetate can be derived from other sources such as these:

- Coriander (Coriandrum savitum)
- Water Dropwort (Oenanthe javanica)
- Kacip Fatimah (Labisia pumila)
- Mandarin Orange (Citrus reticulata)
- Curry Flowers (Helichrysum italicum)
- Sage Leaves (Salvia officinalis, Salvia oligophylla)
- Pink Rock-Rose (Cistus creticus)
- Desert Horse-Purslane (Trianthema portulacastrum)
- Alder Buckthorn (Frangula alnus)
- Doum Palm (Hyphaene thebaica)

Gas chromatography and mass spectrometry were used to identify incensole in these specimen, but to conclusively identify these species as producers of incensole/incensole acetate, isolation and structural elucidation from these species would have to occur.

== Detection and characterization ==
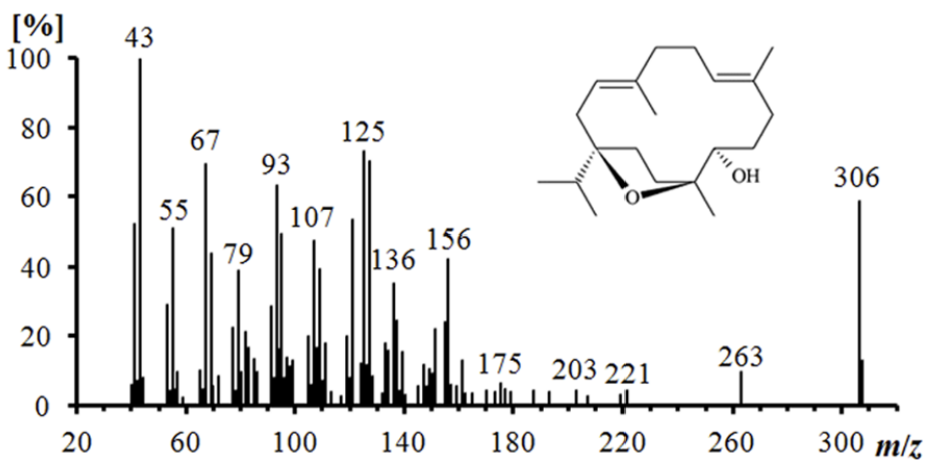
Deconvoluted mass spectrum of Incensole from incensole and serratol total ion count peak. RT of 24.02 min. (Baeten et al. 2014)

Incensole was originally isolated in 1966 by S. Corsano and R. Nicoletti using several ether extractions and vacuum separations, and then characterized using UV-Vis, IR, and H-NMR spectroscopy. They found incensole to have no UV-Vis absorption above 210 mμ. The distinguishing IR and H-NMR peaks of incensole are reported in the tables below, and the observed mass spectrum of incensole from a study done in 2014 on frankincense in incense pots is pictured to the right.

IR Peaks of Incensole
Wave Number (cm^{−1})	Peak Identity
3620	-OH
1670	C=C
1375, 1390	CH_{3}-C-CH_{3}
1050	C-O

NMR Peaks of Incensole in CCl_{4} at 60 Mc
Chemical Shift (ppm)	Protons	Group Identity
0.90	(d, 6H, J = 6.5 c/s)	isopropyl
1.02	(s, 3H)	CH_{3}-C-O
1.48, 1.61	(s, 3H)	CH_{3}-C=
3.18	(d, 1H, J = 10 c/s)	HC-OH
5.06	(2H, broad signal)	CH_{3}CH=C(CH_{3})_{2}

Incensole is most often extracted by chromatographic extractions and hydrodistillations, which produce a frankincense essential oil. Incensole is typically characterized by GC/MS although thin layer chromatography and near-infrared spectroscopy.

Unfortunately, within some of the earlier literature, frankincense biomarker compositions have been misattributed to different Boswellia species, as was seen in the mistaken attribution of the first extraction of incensole being from a B. carteri specimen when it likely came from a B. papyrifera specimen. This is likely because the taxonomic certifications for frankincense bought from market as opposed to collected straight from the tree are often faulty or absent.

== In archaeology ==
Frankincense has been used for thousands of years in religious ceremonies and for medicinal purposes. In fact, by tracing incensole's degraded products, historians have been able to use it to understand the historical use of incense in religion. In one such case, the examination of incensole as a biomarker led to the identification of certain porous pots buried in medieval, Belgian, Christian graves as incense burners. Further study indicated that though frankincense was a main component of funerary incense at the time, other, cheaper local resins were mixed into the incense, possibly to reduce cost.

Additionally, frankincense has been used for thousands of years as medicine. It is listed in texts such as the Papyrus Ebers and the Syriac book of medicine and was prescribed by the practitioners Celsus and Culpepper as a remedy for a variety of ailments from stomach ulcers and gastrointestinal hemorrhages to gout and open wounds. Modern analysis on the medicinal efficacy of frankincense has revealed incensole and incensole acetate, along with boswellic acids, to be the bioactive ingredients of frankincense.

Due to its religious and medicinal significance, frankincense and its biomarker components, like incensole, can be found all over the world in Europe, Asia, the Mediterranean, and the Middle East as the result of global trade.

== Medicinal properties ==
Previously, the therapeutic properties of frankincense had been attributed to boswellic acids within the resin, but research from 2019 and 2020 has found incensole and its acetate ester to be major contributors to frankincense's therapeutic efficacy. This research has found incensole to act as an anti-inflammatory and neuroprotective compound after murine head-trauma on top of exhibiting anxiolytic, anti-depressive, and sedative effects in mice.

It is proposed that incensole works as an anti-inflammatory through the inhibition of the NF-κB pathway which is responsible for the increased production of proinflammatory proteins. Insensitivity in the NF-κB pathway is correlated to arthritis, asthma, inflammatory bowel disease, ataxia telangiectasia, cancers, and neurodegenerative diseases.

It has also been found that incensole acetate activates the TRPV3 channel which is responsible for regulating wound healing and the perception of pain and itching, among other things. It is thought that this is another key component of incensole's role as an anti-inflammatory agent.

Incensole has also been cited as a potential antibacterial against Bacillus.
