= Boswellia nana =

Conservation status
- Vulnerable (IUCN 3.1)

Scientific classification
- Kingdom: Plantae
- Clade: Tracheophytes
- Clade: Angiosperms
- Clade: Eudicots
- Clade: Rosids
- Order: Sapindales
- Family: Burseraceae
- Genus: Boswellia
- Species: B. nana

Binomial name
- Boswellia nana Hepper

Species of flowering plant

Boswellia nana is a species of plant in the Burseraceae family endemic to the Yemeni island of Socotra. They are small trees or shrubs, sometimes so bent that they are lying nearly horizontal to the ground.

The habitat of Boswellia nana is arid, partly deciduous forest land on limestone escarpments, at altitudes from 300 to 550 m. Specimens are also known to grow on flat, paved limestone; B. nana is known from only in two populations, confined to an area of less than 20 km^{2} in the northeastern part of the island.

It is possible that Boswellia nana is a natural hybrid between B. socotrana and another Boswellia species (though which other species is, as yet, unknown). Some evidence for this is found in a solitary Boswellia tree discovered growing at the bottom of limestone cliffs at Hamadero; it displays some characteristics of both B. nana and B. socotrana. Furthermore, this tree is growing in an area that lies ecologically in between the habitats of both species, sharing certain qualities. However, B. nana was thought (by botanists Mats Thulin and Abdul Nasser Al-Gifri, in 1998) to be a smaller form of Boswellia popoviana.
