= Boswellia elegans =

Scientific classification
- Kingdom: Plantae
- Clade: Tracheophytes
- Clade: Angiosperms
- Clade: Eudicots
- Clade: Rosids
- Order: Sapindales
- Family: Burseraceae
- Genus: Boswellia
- Species: B. elegans

Binomial name
- Boswellia elegans Engl., 1904

Species of flowering plant

Boswellia elegans is a species of trees in the order Sapindales, found in Africa.
