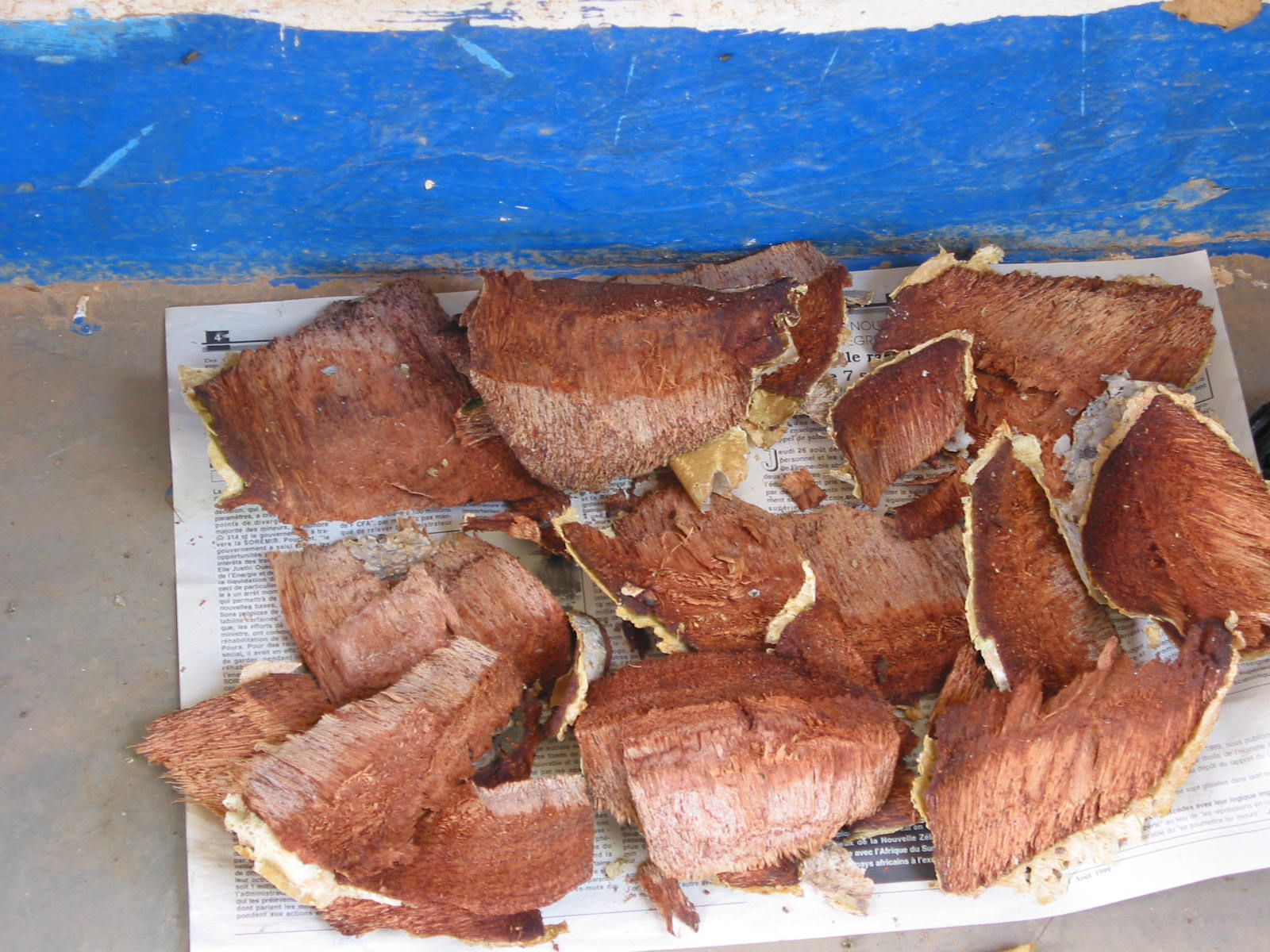
- bark of Boswellia dalzielii

Conservation status
- Least Concern (IUCN 3.1)

Scientific classification
- Kingdom: Plantae
- Clade: Tracheophytes
- Clade: Angiosperms
- Clade: Eudicots
- Clade: Rosids
- Order: Sapindales
- Family: Burseraceae
- Genus: Boswellia
- Species: B. dalzielii

Binomial name
- Boswellia dalzielii Hutch.

= Boswellia dalzielii =

Species of flowering plant

Boswellia dalzielii is a tree species in the family Burseraceae found in Africa. The bark of this plant is used in traditional medicines.

Gallic and protocatechuic acids were isolated as the main antibacterial and antioxidant principles of the stem bark of B. dalzielii. 4'-Methoxy-(E)-resveratrol 3-O-rutinoside, incensole and b-sitosterol were also isolated.
