= Boswellia sp. A =

Conservation status
- Vulnerable (IUCN 3.1)

Scientific classification
- Kingdom: Plantae
- Clade: Tracheophytes
- Clade: Angiosperms
- Clade: Eudicots
- Clade: Rosids
- Order: Sapindales
- Family: Burseraceae
- Genus: Boswellia
- Species: B. sp. A

Binomial name
- Boswellia sp. A

Species of flowering plant

Boswellia sp. A is an undescribed species of plant in the family Burseraceae. It is endemic to Yemen. Its natural habitats are subtropical or tropical dry forests and rocky areas.
