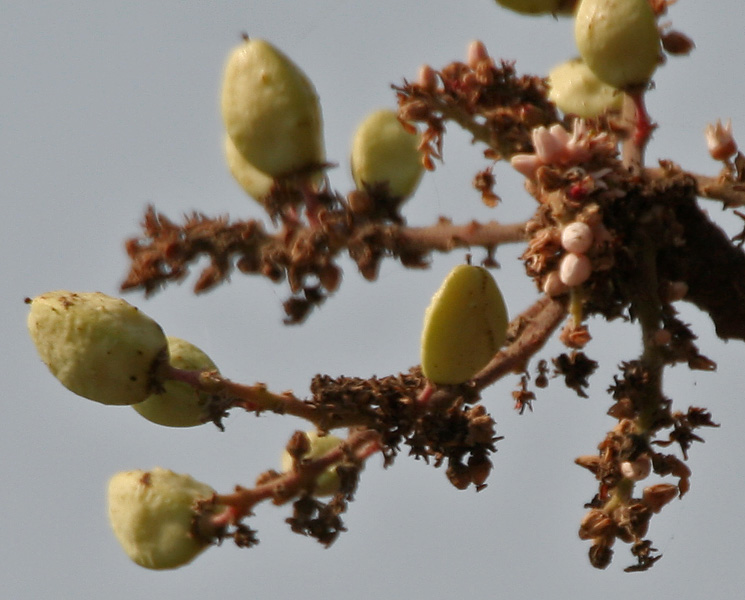
- in Kinnerasani Wildlife Sanctuary, India

Scientific classification
- Kingdom: Plantae
- Clade: Embryophytes
- Clade: Tracheophytes
- Clade: Spermatophytes
- Clade: Angiosperms
- Clade: Eudicots
- Clade: Rosids
- Order: Sapindales
- Family: Burseraceae
- Genus: Boswellia
- Species: B. serrata

Binomial name
- Boswellia serrata Roxb.

Synonyms
- Boswellia glabra Roxb.; Boswellia hirsuta Sm.; Boswellia thurifera Roxb.; Libanus thurifer Colebr. (nom. provis.); Chloroxylon dupada Buch.-Ham.

= Boswellia serrata =

Species of plant

Boswellia serrata is a plant that produces Indian frankincense. The plant is native to much of India and the Punjab region that extends into Pakistan.

== Sustainability ==
Boswellia serrata is currently at risk of being eradicated because of non-sustainable practices.

== Research ==
Boswellia serrata contains various derivatives of boswellic acid including β-boswellic acid, acetyl-β-boswellic acid, 11-keto-β-boswellic acid and acetyl-11-keto-β-boswellic acid.

Extracts of Boswellia serrata have been clinically studied for osteoarthritis and joint function, with the research showing trends of benefit (slight improvement) in pain and function.

== Gallery ==
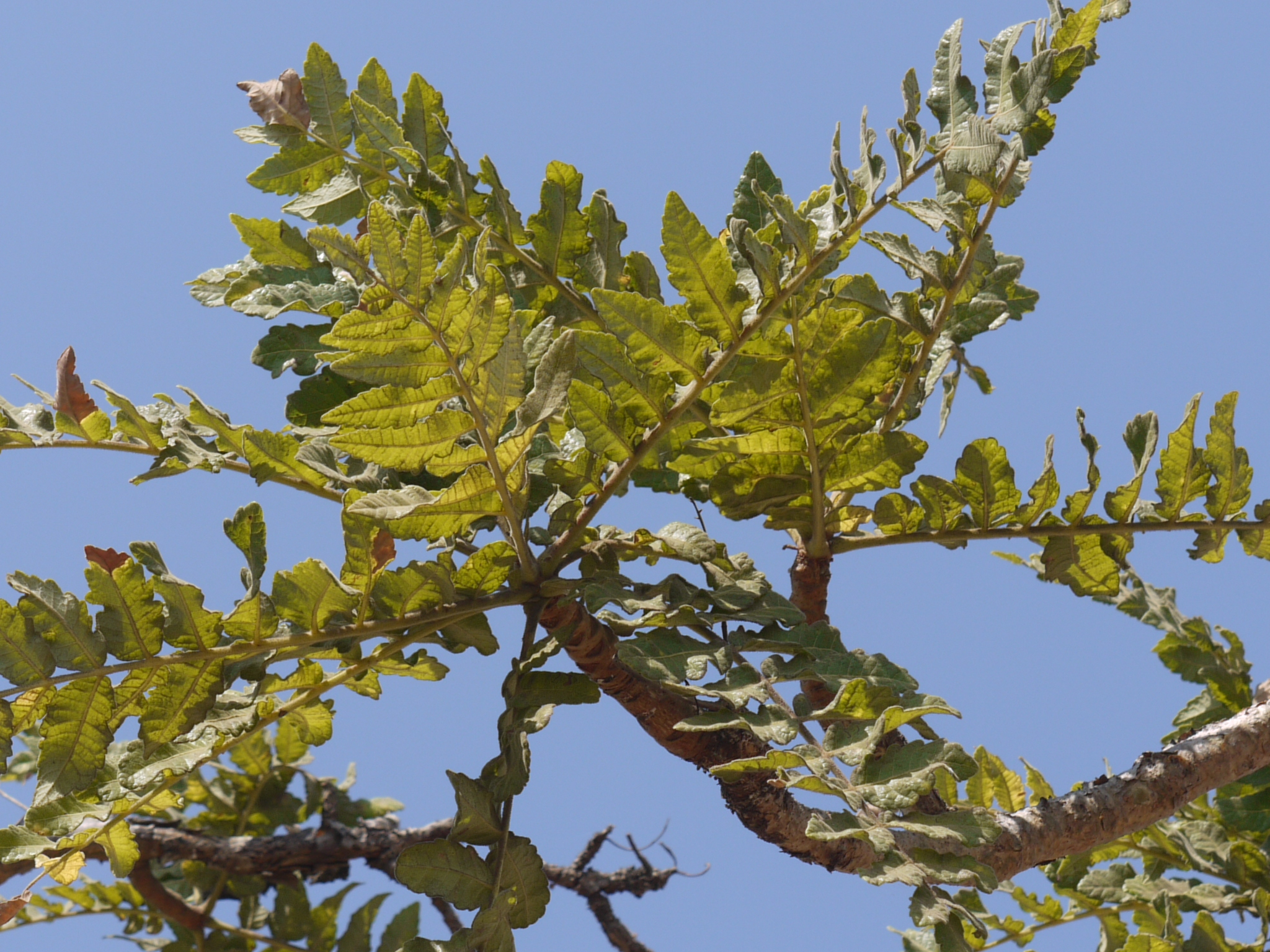

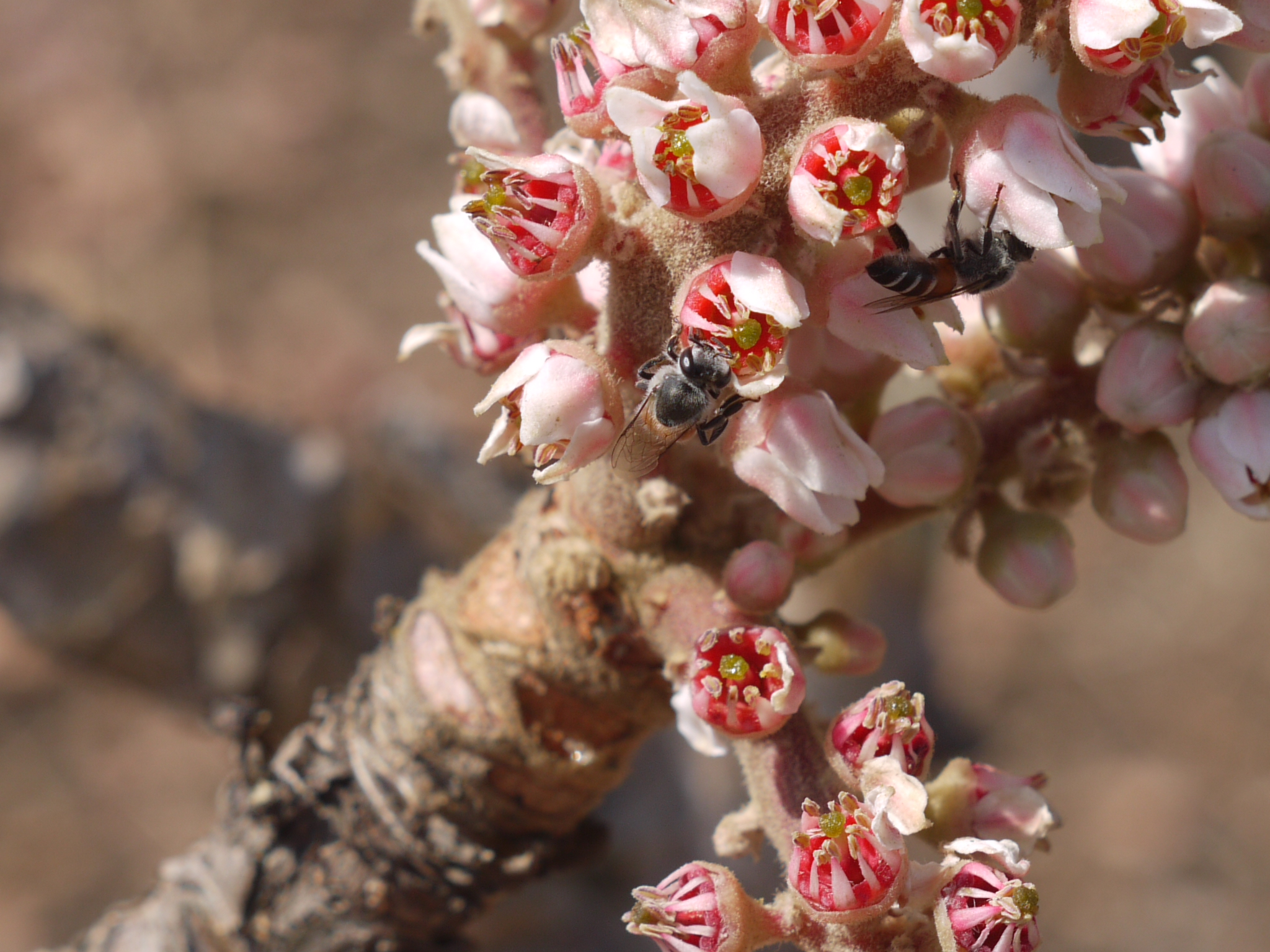

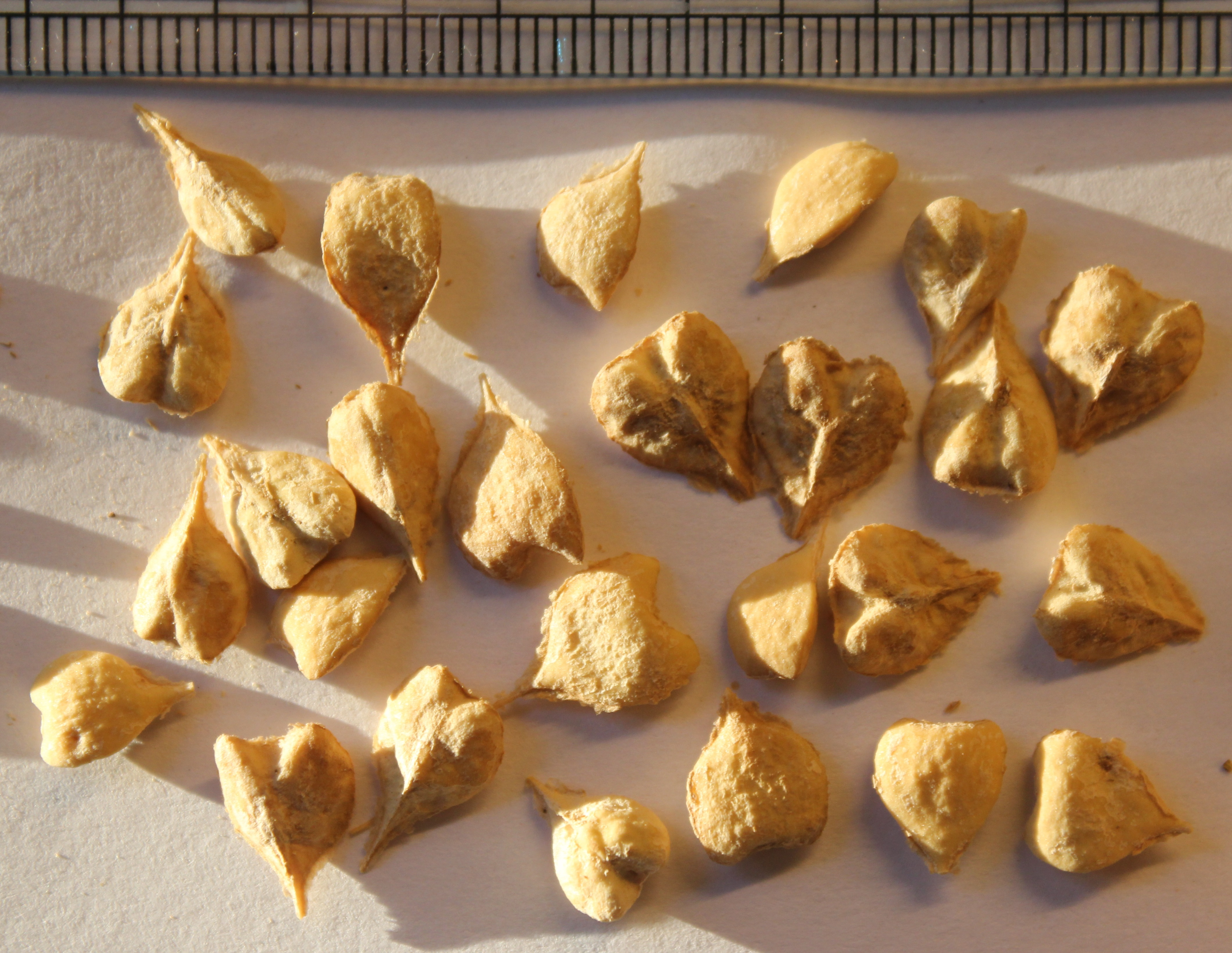
Seeds

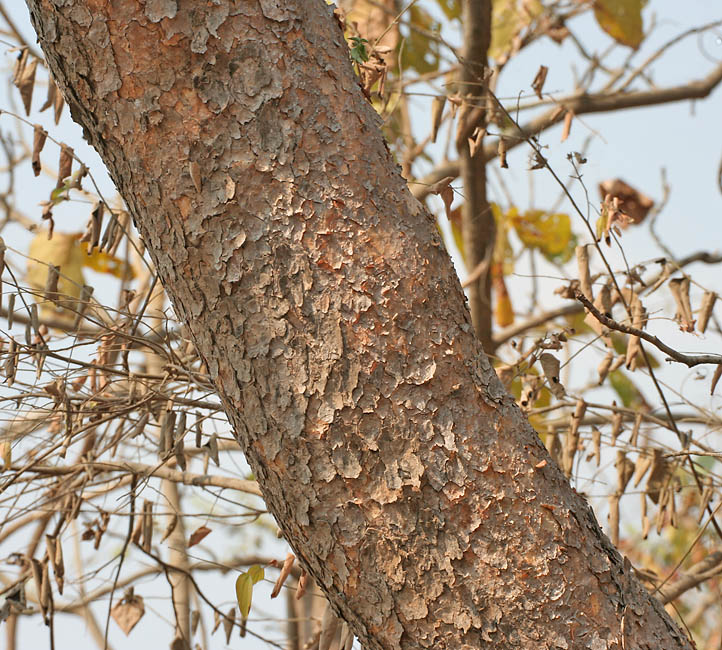

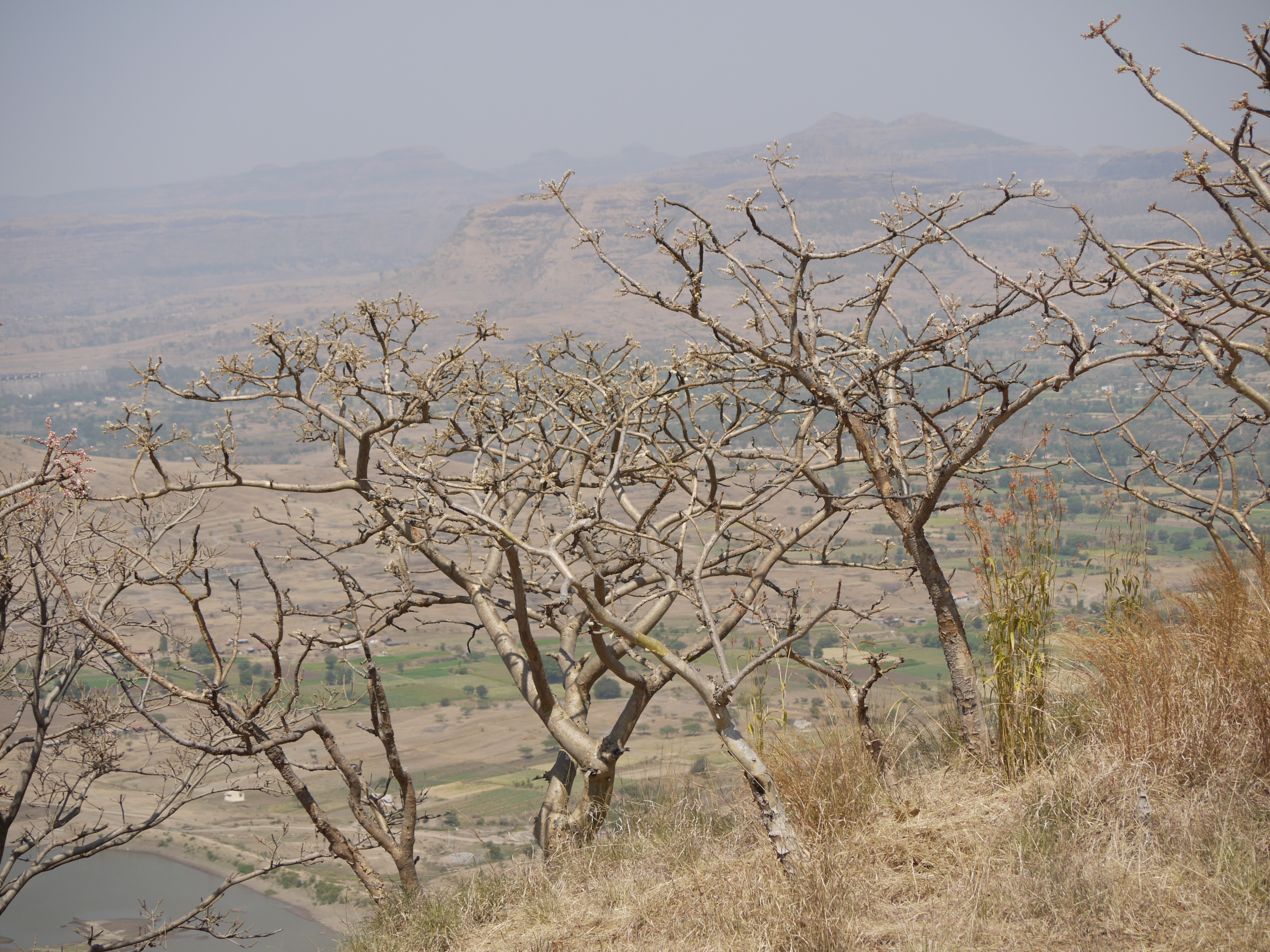
