= Frankincense =

Aromatic resin from Boswellia trees

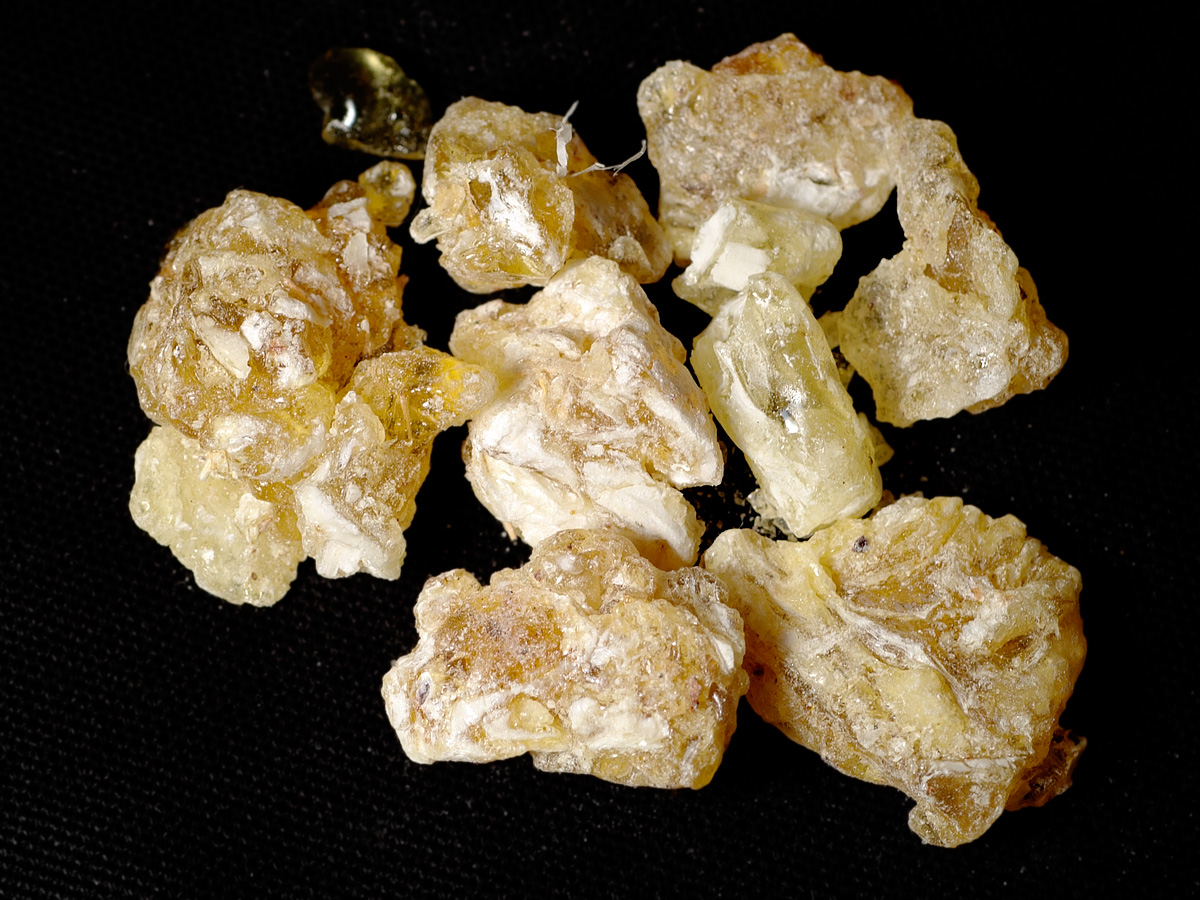
Frankincense

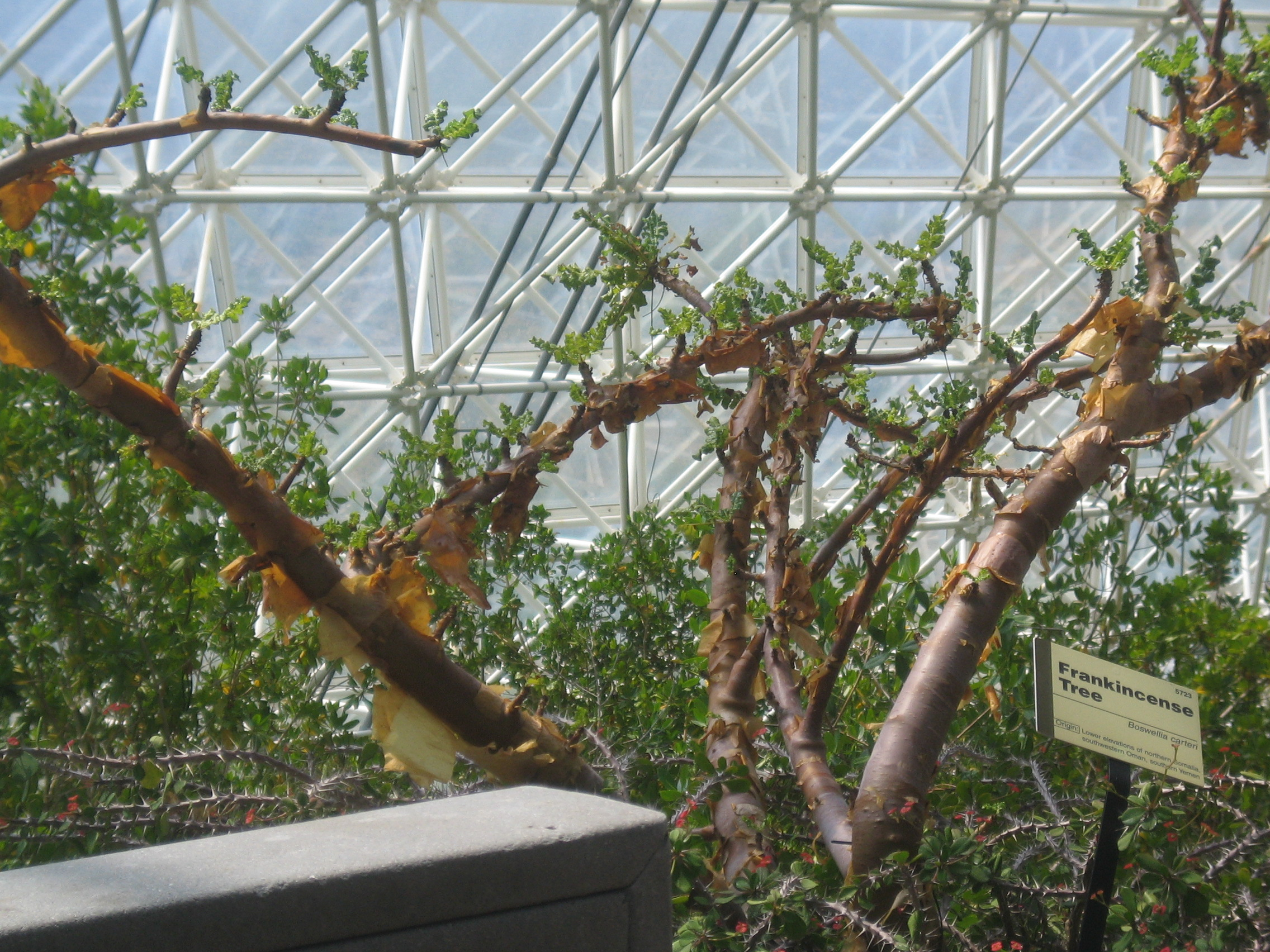
Boswellia sacra Syn. B. carteri tree that produces frankincense, growing inside Biosphere 2

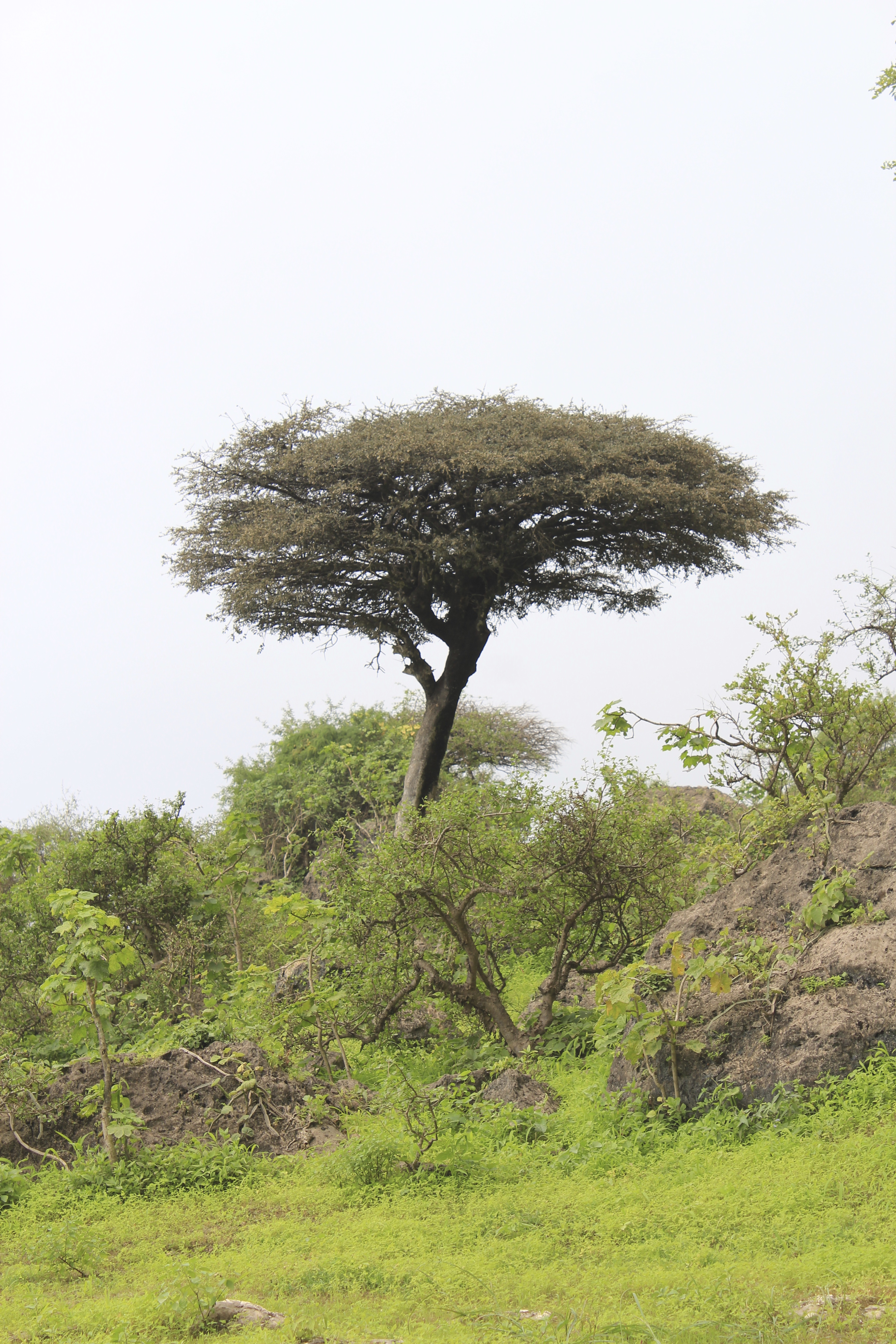
A tall frankincense tree (Boswellia sacra), Dhofar, Oman

Frankincense, also known as olibanum (/oʊˈlɪbənəm/), is an aromatic resin used in incense and perfume, obtained from trees of the genus Boswellia in the family Burseraceae. The word is from Old French franc encens ('high-quality incense'). There are several species of Boswellia that produce frankincense, including, but not limited to, Boswellia sacra (syn. B. bhaw-dajiana, syn. B. carteri), B. frereana, B. serrata (B. thurifera), and B. papyrifera. Resin from each is available in various grades which is affected by the time in which it is harvested. The resin is hand-sorted for quality.

== Etymology ==
The English word frankincense derives from the Old French expression franc encens, meaning 'true incense', maybe with the sense of 'high quality incense'. The adjective franc in Old French meant 'noble, true', in this case perhaps 'pure'; although franc is ultimately derived from the tribal name of the Franks, it is not a direct reference to them in the word frankincense.

The word for frankincense in the Koine Greek of the New Testament, λίβανος, líbanos (or λιβανωτός, libanōtós), is cognate with the name of Lebanon (Greek: Λίβανος); the same can be said with regard to Arabic, Phoenician, Hebrew, and Vulgar Latin: lĭbănus. This is postulated to be because they both derive from the word for 'white' and that the spice route went via Mount Lebanon (Koine Greek: Λίβανος, romanized: Libanos). Medieval Latin: olibanum derived from λίβανος or libanus. The leading "o" may have come from Latin: oleum, lit. 'oil', or from the Greek article o- or Arabic article al-. Other names include Arabic: اللبان, romanized: al-lubān, Persian: کندر, romanized: kondor, Syriac: בוּסמִין, romanized: busmin, Hebrew: לבונה, romanized: ləvonā, Bengali: লোবান, ধুনো, romanized: lōban, dhunō, Somali: foox (fooḥ), Turkish: akgünlük, Classical Latin: tūs.

== Description ==
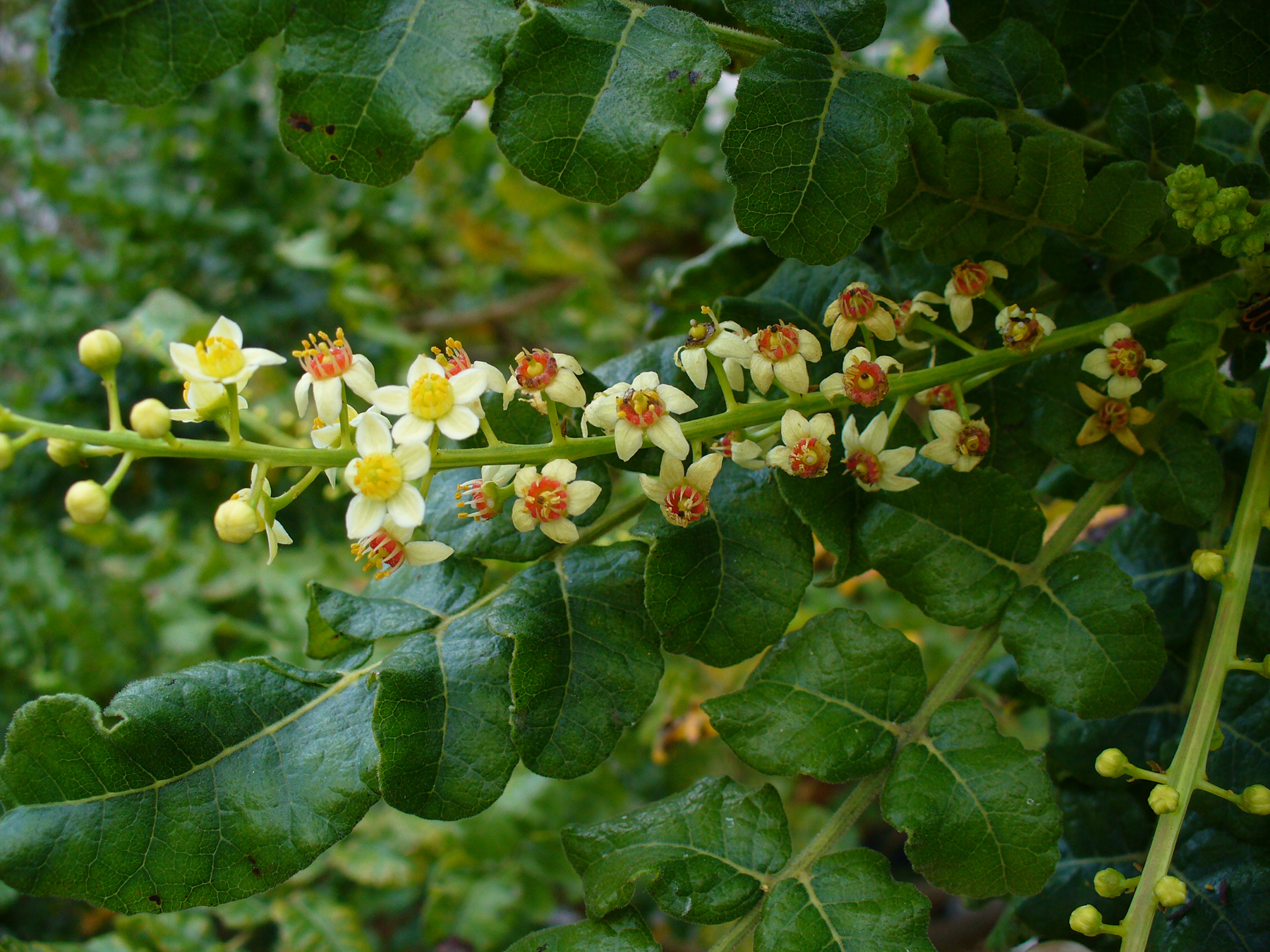
Flowers and branches of the Boswellia sacra tree

The trees start producing resin at about eight to 10 years old. Tapping is done two to three times per year with the final taps producing the best tears because of their higher aromatic terpene, sesquiterpene and diterpene content. Generally speaking, the more opaque resins are the best quality. Today 90 percent of the world's production of frankincense comes from the Horn of Africa, predominantly from the border communities on the Somalia–Ethiopia border.

The main species in trade are:

- Boswellia frereana grows in northern Somalia.
- Boswellia occulta: Somalia. For a long time Somali harvesters considered Boswellia occulta to be the same species as Boswellia carteri even though their shapes are different, and sold resins from both species as the same thing. However in 2019, it was clear that the chemical compositions of their essential oils are completely different.
- Boswellia sacra: Somalia, South Arabia.
  - Boswellia bhaw-dajiana (older spelling Boswellia bhau-dajiana) It is a synonym of Boswellia sacra
  - Boswellia carteri (older spelling Boswellia carterii): It was long considered an independent species, but in the 1980s it was determined to be a synonym of Boswellia sacra.
- Boswellia serrata (synonym Boswellia thurifera): India.
- Boswellia papyrifera: Ethiopia, Eritrea, Sudan.

Recent studies indicate that frankincense tree populations are declining, partly from overexploitation. Heavily tapped trees produce seeds that germinate at only 16% while seeds of trees that had not been tapped germinate at more than 80%. In addition, burning, grazing, and attacks by the longhorn beetle have reduced the tree population. Clearing of frankincense woodlands for conversion to agriculture is also a major threat.

== Chemical composition ==
Structure of β-boswellic acid, one of the main active components of frankincense

These are some of the chemical compounds present in frankincense:

- acid resin (6%), soluble in alcohol and having the formula C_{20}H_{32}O_{4}
- gum (similar to gum arabic) 30–36%
- 3-acetyl-beta-boswellic acid (Boswellia sacra)
- alpha-boswellic acid (Boswellia sacra)
- incensole acetate, C_{21}H_{34}O_{3}
- phellandrene
- olibanic acid

Among various plants in the genus Boswellia, only Boswellia sacra, Boswellia serrata and Boswellia papyrifera have been confirmed to contain significant amounts of boswellic acids.

== History ==
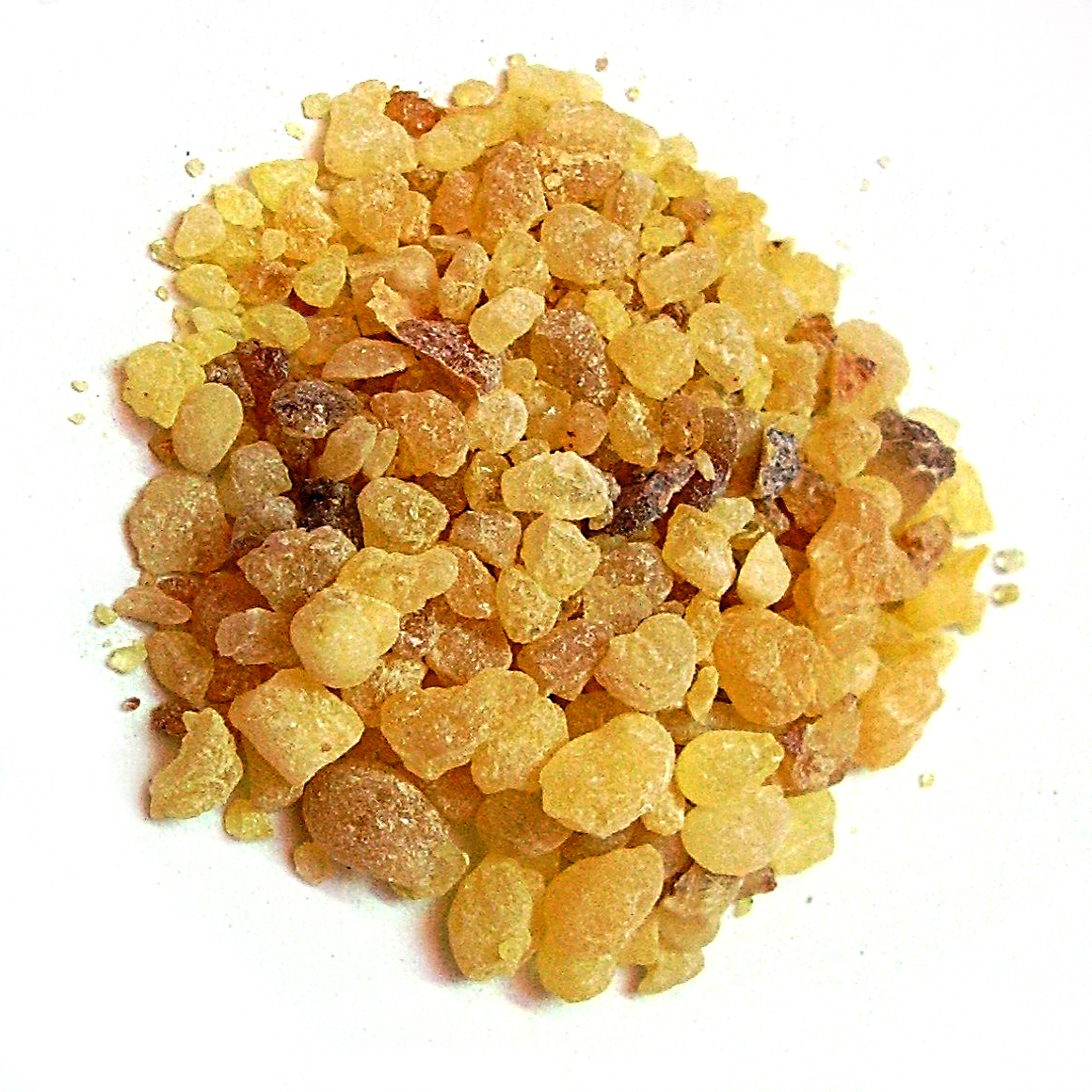
Frankincense olibanum resin

Frankincense has been traded on the Somali and Arabian Peninsula for centuries. Greek historian Herodotus wrote in The History that frankincense was harvested from trees in southern Arabia. Pliny the Elder mentioned frankincense in the Naturalis Historia.

Frankincense, which was used in the Roman Empire prior to the spread of Christianity, was reintroduced to Western Europe possibly by Frankish Crusaders and other Western Europeans on their journeys to the Eastern Roman Empire, where it was commonly used in Catholic Mass.

Southern Arabia was an exporter of frankincense in antiquity, with some of it being traded as far as China. The 13th-century Chinese writer and customs inspector Zhao Rugua wrote that Ruxiang or xunluxiang (Chinese: 乳香 rǔ xiāng/ 薰陸香 xūn lù xiāng) comes from the three Dashi states (Chinese: 大食 dàshí – Caliphate (Arab Muslims)) of Maloba (Murbat), Shihe (Shihr), and Nufa (Dhofar), from remote mountains; the trunk of the tree is notched with a hatchet, upon which the resin flows out, and, when hardened, turns into incense, which is gathered and made into lumps; it is transported to the Dashi ports, then on ship to Sanfoqi.

== Production ==
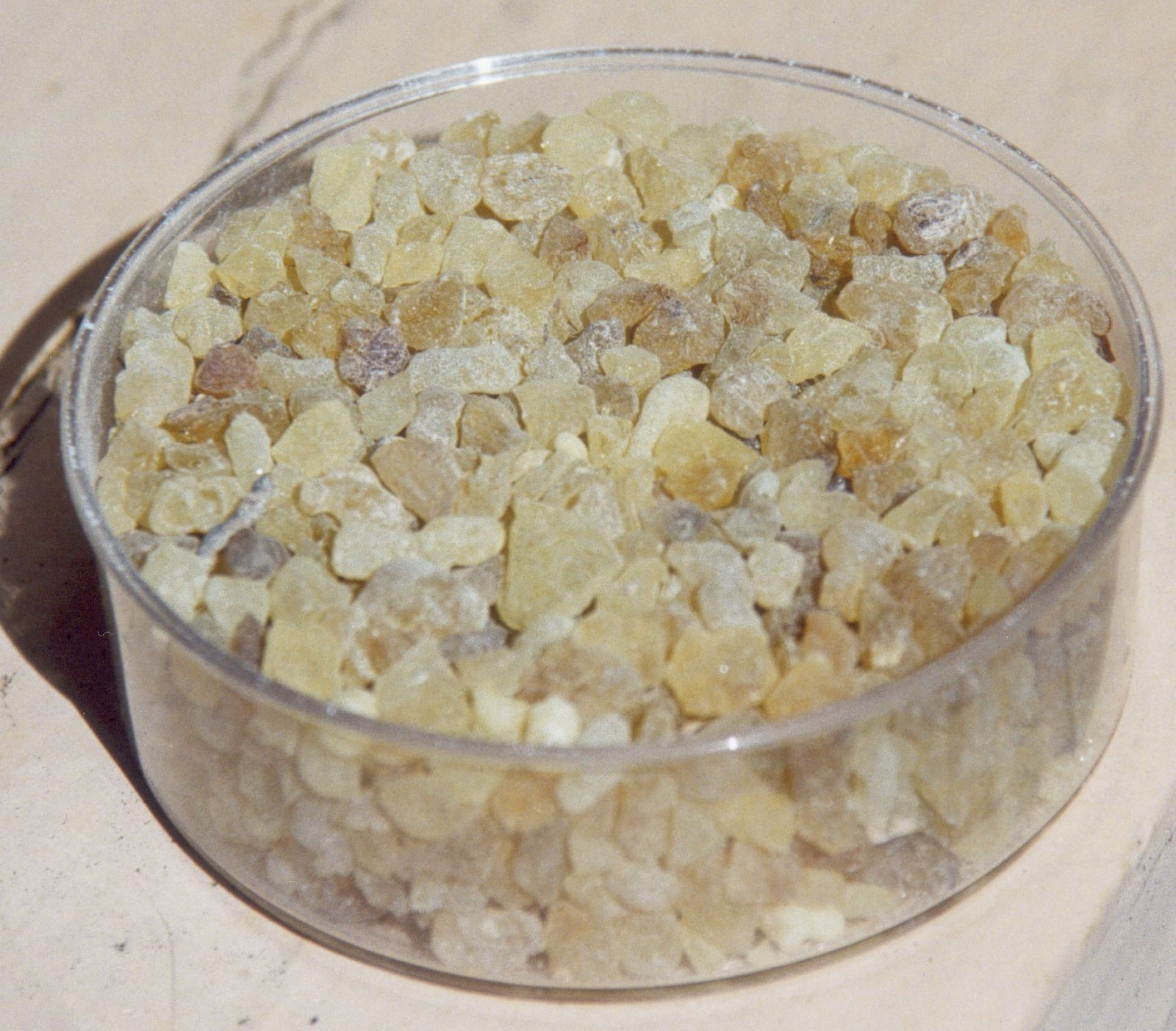
Frankincense

Thousands of tons of frankincense are traded every year to be used in religious ceremonies as incense in thuribles and by makers of perfumes and essential oils.

=== Somalia ===
In Somalia, frankincense is harvested in the Bari and Sanaag regions: mountains lying at the northwest of Erigavo; El Afweyn District; Cal Madow mountain range, a westerly escarpment that runs parallel to the coast; Cal Miskeed, including Hantaara and Habeeno plateau and a middle segment of the frankincense-growing escarpment; Karkaar mountains or eastern escarpment, which lies at the eastern fringe of the frankincense escarpment.

=== Oman ===
In Dhofar, Oman, frankincense species grow north of Salalah. It was traded in the ancient coastal city of Sumhuram, now Khor Rori, and Al-Baleed, an ancient port. In 2000, UNESCO inscribed the sites as a World Heritage Site Land of Frankincense.

== Ecological status ==
In 1998, the International Union for Conservation of Nature warned that one of the primary frankincense species, Boswellia sacra, is "near threatened". Frankincense trees are not covered by the Convention on International Trade in Endangered Species of Wild Fauna and Flora, but experts argue that Boswellia species meet the criteria for protection. In a 2006 study, an ecologist at Wageningen University & Research claimed that, by the late-1990s, Boswellia papyrifera trees in Eritrea were becoming hard to find. In 2019, a new paper predicted a 50% reduction in Boswellia papyrifera within the next two decades. This species, found mainly in Ethiopia, Eritrea, and Sudan, accounts for about two-thirds of global frankincense production. The paper warns that all Boswellia species are threatened by habitat loss and overexploitation. Most Boswellia grow in harsh, arid regions beset by poverty and conflict. Harvesting and selling the tree's resin is one of the few sources of income for the inhabitants, resulting in overtapping.

== Research ==
Limited clinical studies have provided weak evidence for the use of frankincense resin in certain disease conditions, but the inconsistent, low quality of research remains inconclusive for determining any effect.

== Uses ==
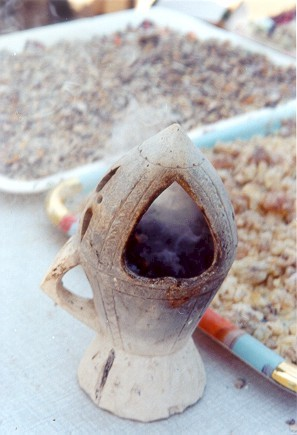
Frankincense is often prepared inside a censer, such as the meerschaum dabqaad traditionally used in Horn of Africa.

Although the ancient Egyptians did not always distinguish frankincense from other resins such as myrrh, references to incense from the land of Punt have been dated to the third millennium BCE. Incense trees being transported for cultivation in Thebes are depicted in the so-called "Punt Colonnade" at the mortuary temple of Hatshepsut. The Ebers Papyrus, from around 1500 BCE, provides some of the earliest evidence for frankincense used with intent as a possible therapy.

The incense offering occupied a prominent position in the sacrificial legislation of the ancient Hebrews. The Book of Exodus (30:34–38) prescribes frankincense, blended with equal amounts of three aromatic spices, to be ground and burnt in the sacred altar before the Ark of the Covenant in the wilderness Tabernacle, where it was meant to be a holy offering—not to be enjoyed for its fragrance. The Book of Jeremiah (6:20) relates that frankincense was imported from Sheba during the 6th century BC Babylonian captivity. Frankincense is mentioned in the New Testament as one of the three gifts (with gold and myrrh) that the magi "from the East" presented to the Christ Child (Matthew 2:11).

=== Essential oil ===
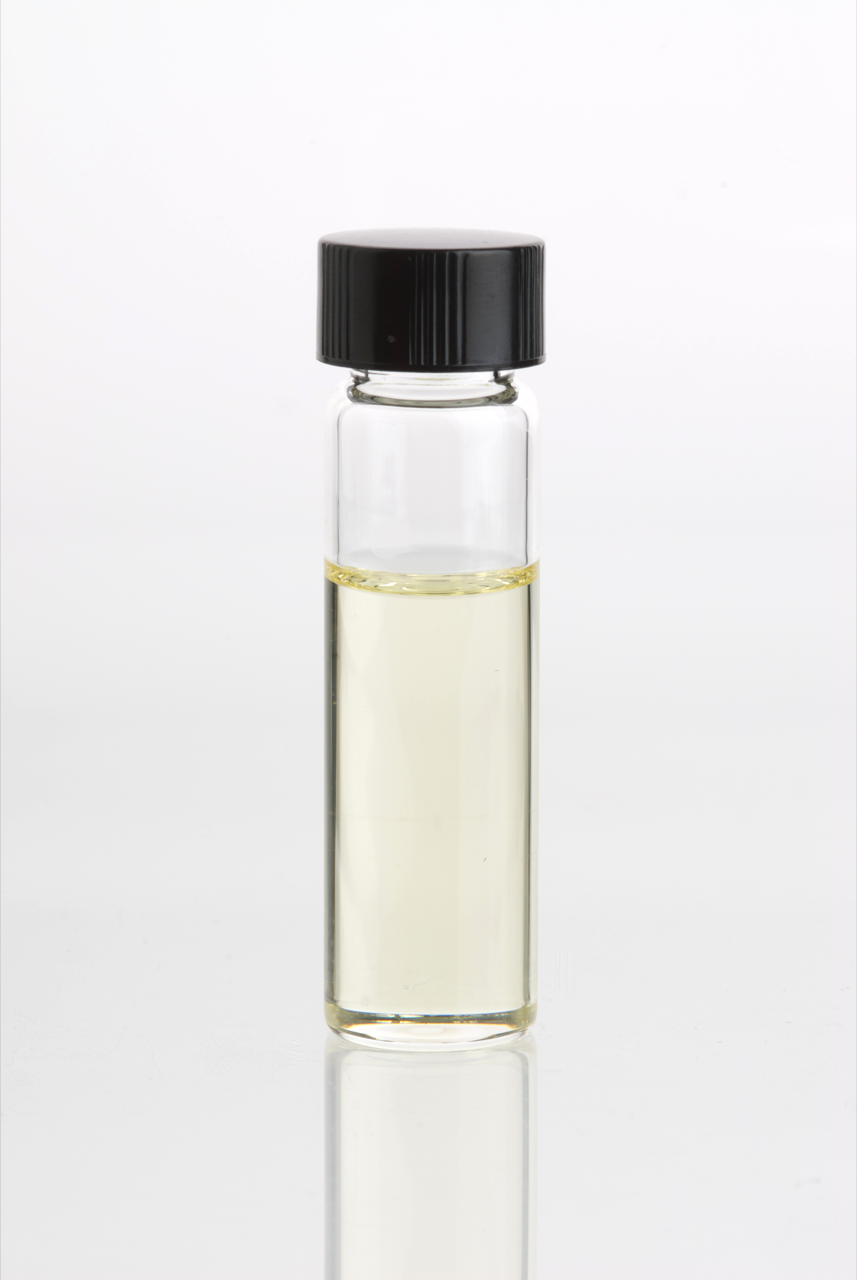
Frankincense (Boswellia sacra Syn. B. carteri) essential oil

The essential oil of frankincense is produced by steam distillation of the tree resin. The oil's chemical components are 75% monoterpenes, sesquiterpenes, and ketones. Contrary to some commercial claims, steam distilled frankincense oils do not contain the insufficiently volatile boswellic acids (triterpenoids), although they may be present in solvent extractions. The chemistry of the essential oil is mainly monoterpenes and sesquiterpenes, such as A-pinene, limonene, and B-pinene. The terpenic smell of frankincense oil is described as "terpenic, incense, peppery, spicy, old wood, woody, pine, resinous, green".

== See also ==
Trade

- Incense trade route, a large network around the Mediterranean and beyond
- Land of Frankincense (Frankincense Trail), site in Oman
- Nabataeans, a trader tribe

Literature

- Desi Sangye Gyatso, author of a Tibetan herbal
- Historia Plantarum (Theophrastus book)

Similar plants and products

- Agarwood
- Benzoin (resin)
- Copal
- Elemi, resin or tree
- Myrrh, resin
- Palo santo (Bursera graveolens), tree
- Pistacia lentiscus (mastic tree), and Mastic (plant resin)
