= Boswellic acid =

Chemical compound

Structure of α-boswellic acid

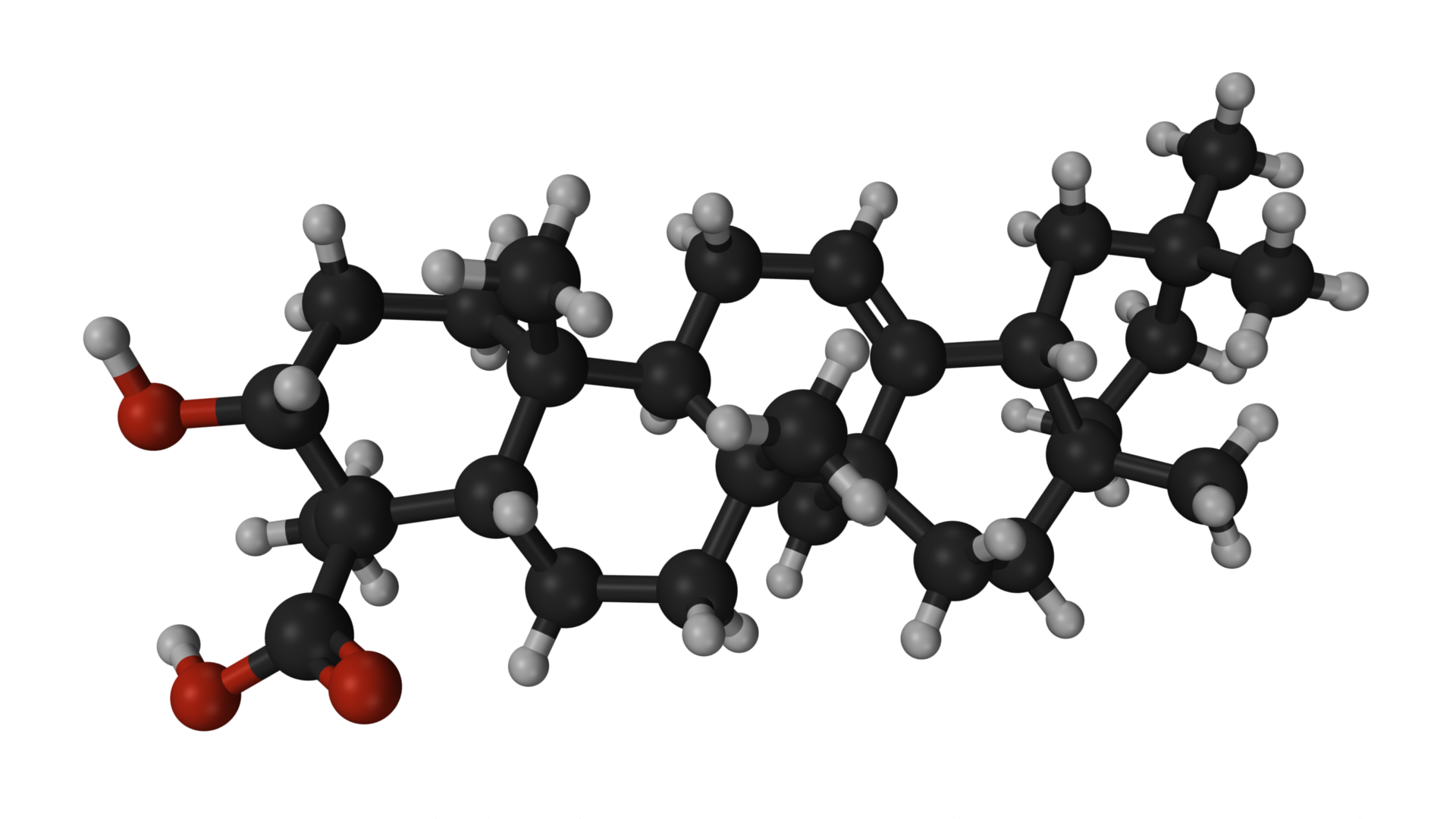
3D model of α-boswellic acid

Structure of β-boswellic acid

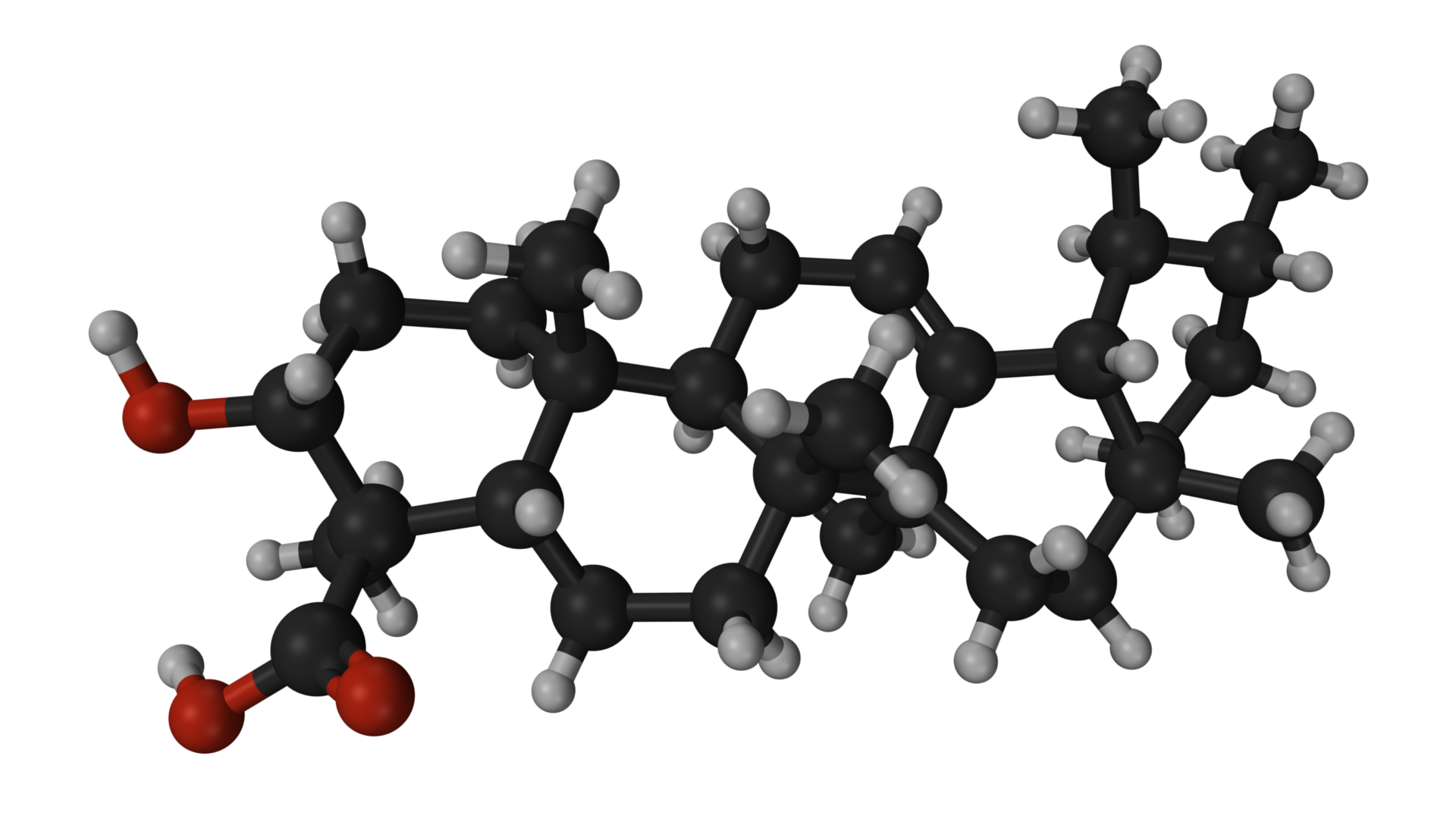
3D model of β-boswellic acid

Structure of 11-keto-β-boswellic acid

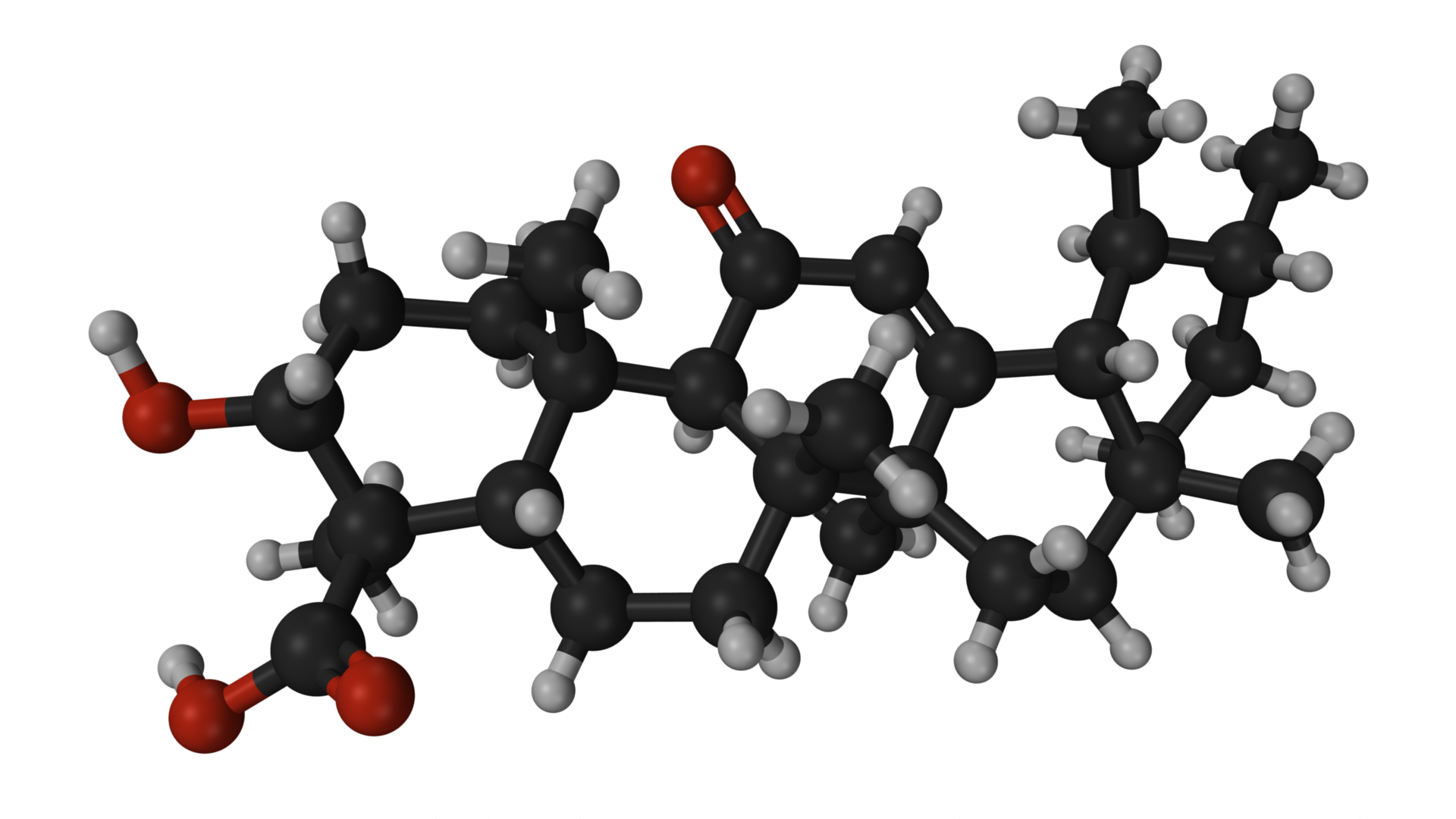
3D model of 11-keto-β-boswellic acid

Boswellic acids are a series of pentacyclic terpenoid molecules that are produced by plants in the genus Boswellia. Like many other terpenes, boswellic acids appear in the resin of the plant that exudes them; it is estimated that they make up 30% of the resin of Boswellia serrata. While boswellic acids are a major component of the resin, the steam or hydro distilled frankincense essential oil does not contain any boswellic acid as these components are non-volatile and too large to come over in the steam distillation process (the essential oil is composed mainly of the much lighter monoterpene and sesquiterpene molecules with small amounts of diterpenoid components being the upper limit in terms of molecular weight).

== Structure ==
The boswellic acids are organic acids, consisting of a pentacyclic triterpene, a carboxyl group and at least one other functional group. Alpha-boswellic acid and beta-boswellic acid, C_{30}H_{48}O_{3} both have an additional hydroxyl group; they differ only in their triterpene structure. Acetyl-alpha-boswellic acid and acetyl-beta-boswellic acid, C_{32}H_{50}O_{4}, replace the hydroxyl group with an acetyl group.

Other boswellic acids include the keto-boswellic acids and their acetyl counterparts.

== Uses ==
Beta-boswellic acid, keto-beta-boswellic acid, and acetyl-keto-beta-boswellic acid (AKBA) have been indicated in apoptosis of cancer cells, in particular brain tumors and cells affected by leukemia or colon cancer.

Acetyl-boswellic acids also exhibit anti-inflammatory behaviour by inhibiting leukotriene synthesis. It inhibits the activity of the enzyme 5-lipoxygenase through a non-redox reaction. Specifically the 3-acetyl-11-keto-beta-boswellic acid binds as an allosteric partial inhibitor, initiating a shift in regioselectivity of the catalyzed reaction. Clinical trials have investigated the effectiveness of boswellic acids in treating ulcerative colitis, but a study on chemically induced colitis in mouse models showed little effectiveness. A later study showed that low doses of Boswellia serrata extract may have hepatoprotective effects. The higher dose was found to have a milder hepatoprotective effect than the lower dose.

Boswellic acids are also thought to decrease the symptoms of asthma; a small 1998 placebo-controlled trial of Boswellia extract for the treatment of asthma showed good results. Boswellia extracts are sold in tablet, capsule and tincture form, but no dosage guidelines have been developed. The risk of hepatotoxicity due to Boswellia administration has not been assessed. A meta-study of Indian Frankincense (Boswellia serrata) as a complementary therapy for arthritis found it had positive effect in all four trials reviewed.
