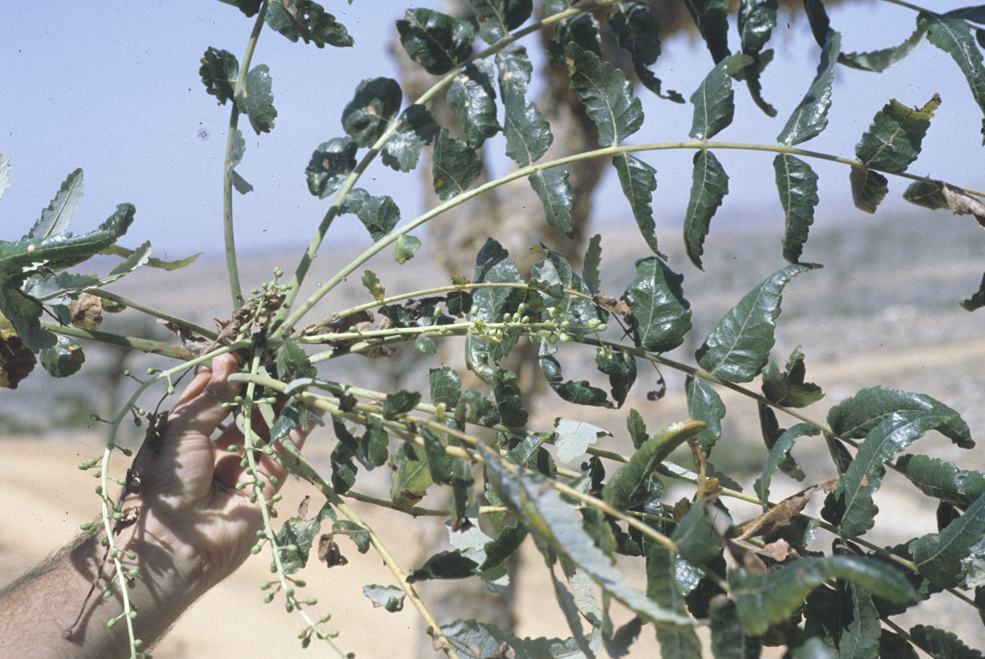

Conservation status
- Endangered (IUCN 3.1)

Scientific classification
- Kingdom: Plantae
- Clade: Tracheophytes
- Clade: Angiosperms
- Clade: Eudicots
- Clade: Rosids
- Order: Sapindales
- Family: Burseraceae
- Genus: Boswellia
- Species: B. elongata

Binomial name
- Boswellia elongata Balf.f.

= Boswellia elongata =

Species of plant

Boswellia elongata is a species of plant in the Burseraceae family. It is endemic to Socotra. Its natural habitats are subtropical or tropical dry forests and subtropical or tropical dry shrubland.
