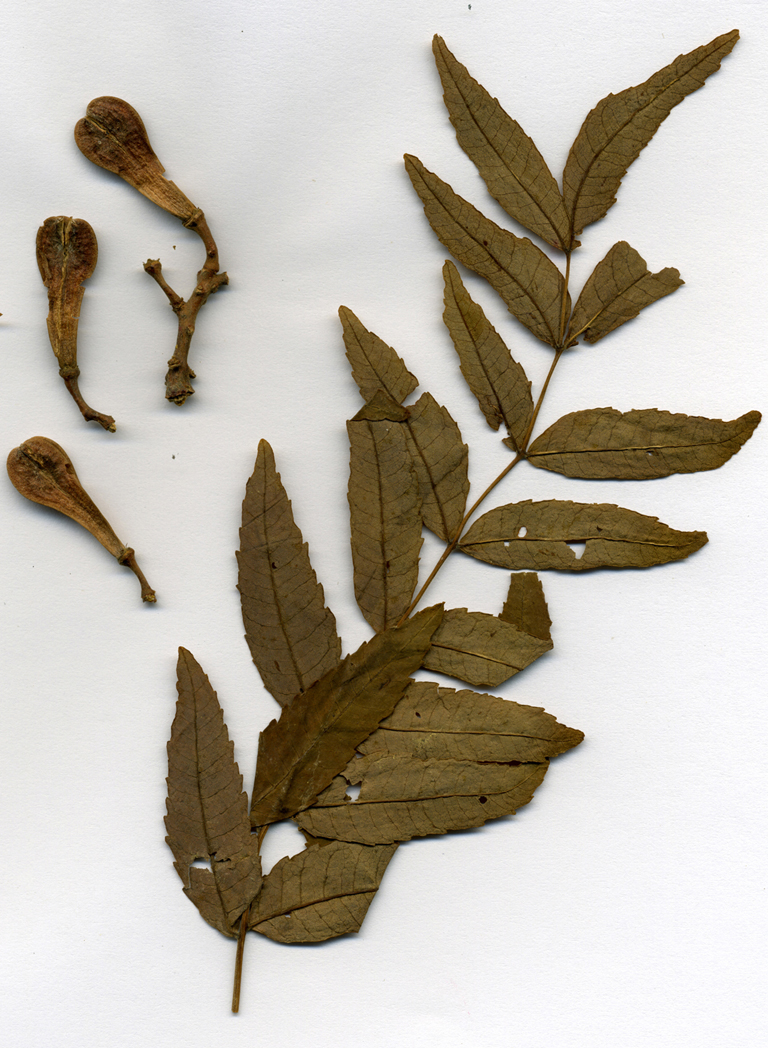

Conservation status
- Vulnerable (IUCN 3.1)

Scientific classification
- Kingdom: Plantae
- Clade: Tracheophytes
- Clade: Angiosperms
- Clade: Eudicots
- Clade: Rosids
- Order: Sapindales
- Family: Burseraceae
- Genus: Boswellia
- Species: B. pirottae

Binomial name
- Boswellia pirottae Chiov.

= Boswellia pirottae =

Species of flowering plant

Boswellia pirottae is a species of plant in the Burseraceae family. Endemic to Ethiopia, it is threatened by habitat loss.
