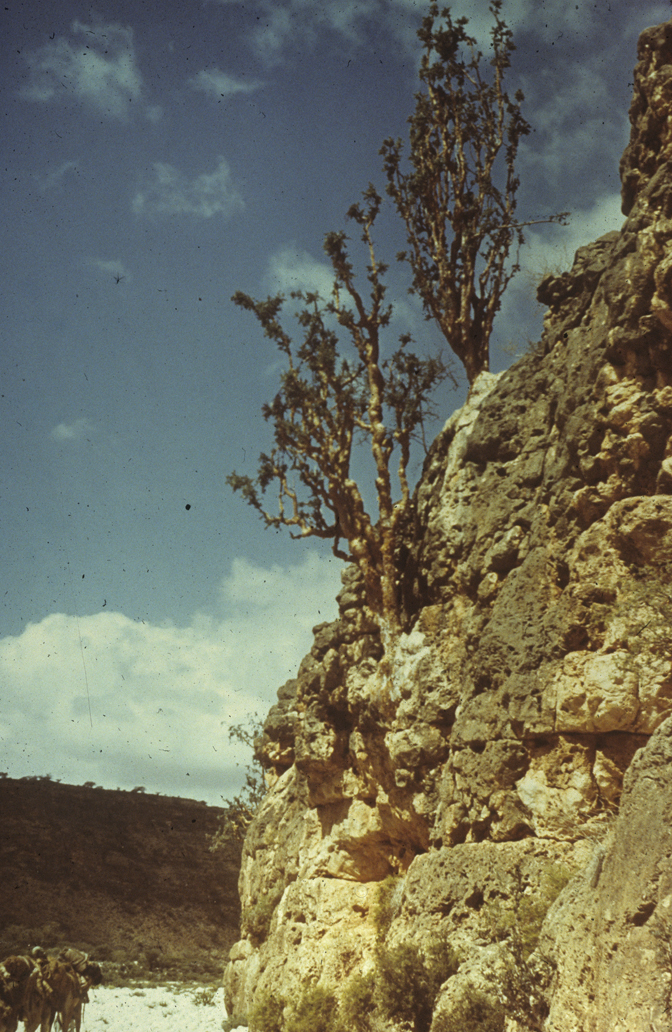

Scientific classification
- Kingdom: Plantae
- Clade: Tracheophytes
- Clade: Angiosperms
- Clade: Eudicots
- Clade: Rosids
- Order: Sapindales
- Family: Burseraceae
- Genus: Boswellia
- Species: B. frereana

Binomial name
- Boswellia frereana Birdw.

= Boswellia frereana =

Species of tree

Boswellia frereana is a species of plant native to northern Somalia where it is known as yagcar, yagar, yigaar, or yegaar. Its frankincense is nicknamed the king of all frankincense, and called by the locals maydi (other spellings include: meydi, meyti, maidi, maieti, and mayeti) or the common name for all frankincense, fooh..The specific epithet refers to William Edward Frere, Member of Council at Bombay.

Other than its aromatic uses, the locals also use it for medicinal purposes; they make it into a paste called "malmal" and apply it on the joints to treat inflammation and arthritis. It is reported to be cultivated in Yemen, but this is more than likely based on an 1870 record by Dr. G. Birdwood citing that B. frereana was seen in Sir Robert Playfair's garden in Aden (Yemen). Playfair had brought B. frereana from Somalia and cultivated it in his garden in Aden. Although rumored to also grow in Oman, scientific and botanical evidence does not confirm that B. frereana either grows or is cultivated there.

In the West B. frereana is called "Coptic Frankincense" as this is the type and grade used by the Coptic Church of Egypt. 80% of B. frereana production is sold to Saudi Arabia where it is traditionally brought home by Muslim pilgrims. The remaining 20% is sold all around the world.
