= Boswellia ogadensis =

Conservation status
- Critically Endangered (IUCN 3.1)

Scientific classification
- Kingdom: Plantae
- Clade: Embryophytes
- Clade: Tracheophytes
- Clade: Spermatophytes
- Clade: Angiosperms
- Clade: Eudicots
- Clade: Rosids
- Order: Sapindales
- Family: Burseraceae
- Genus: Boswellia
- Species: B. ogadensis

Binomial name
- Boswellia ogadensis Vollesen

Species of flowering plant

Boswellia ogadensis is a species of flowering plant in the Burseraceae family. It is a shrub or tree endemic to the Ogaden region of Ethiopia.
