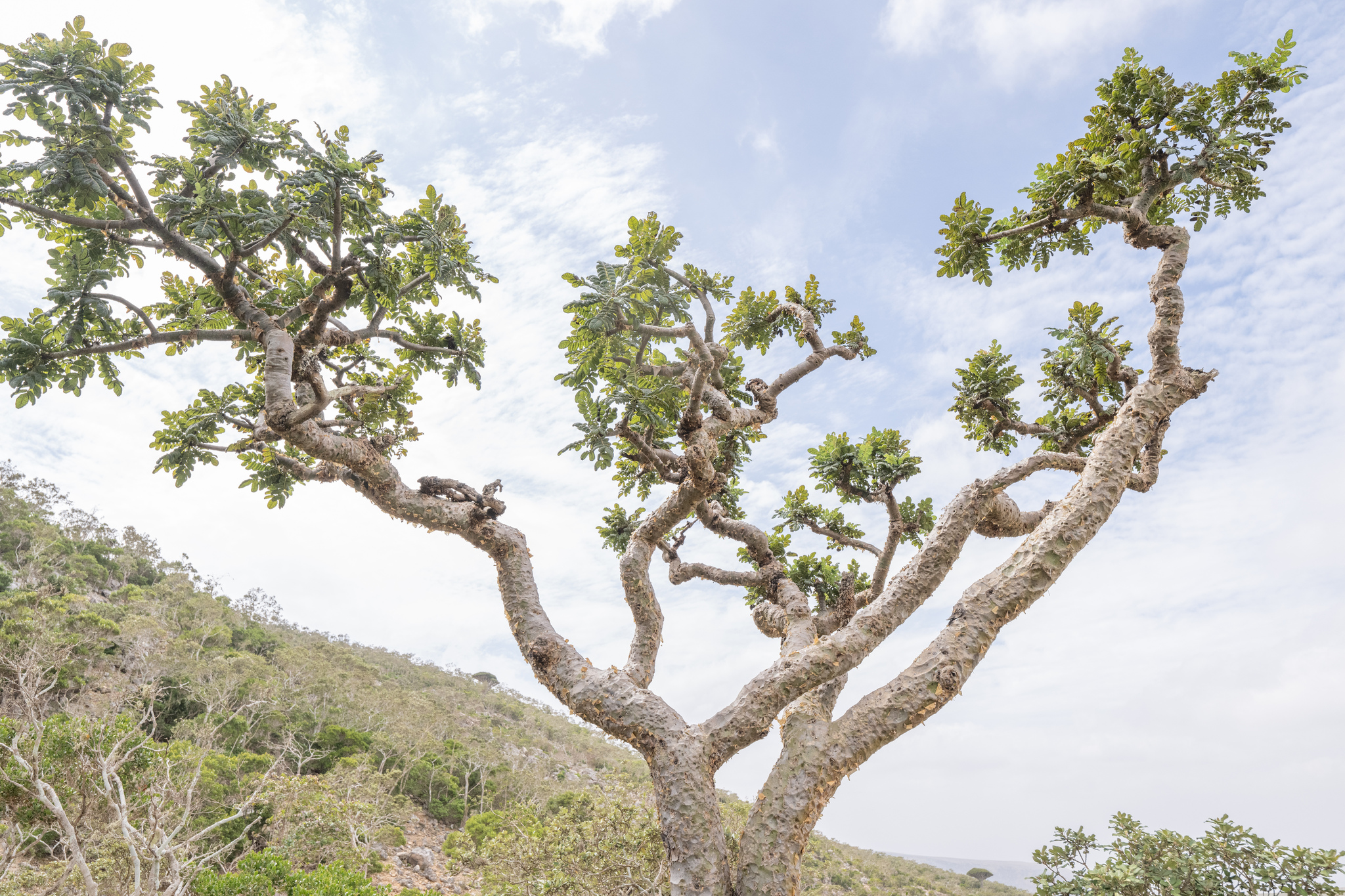

Conservation status
- Vulnerable (IUCN 3.1)

Scientific classification
- Kingdom: Plantae
- Clade: Embryophytes
- Clade: Tracheophytes
- Clade: Angiosperms
- Clade: Eudicots
- Clade: Rosids
- Order: Sapindales
- Family: Burseraceae
- Genus: Boswellia
- Species: B. ameero

Binomial name
- Boswellia ameero Balf.f.

= Boswellia ameero =

Species of plant

Boswellia ameero is a species of flowering plant in the Burseraceae family. It is endemic to the island of Socotra in Yemen, common locally in arid, partly deciduous forests; however, populations are fragmentary, with aged, seldom regenerating trees being dominant. Also, the habitat of B. ameero may be degrading.

The flowers of B. ameero vary; in some populations they are bright pink, in others, pale pink. Boswellia ameero is sometimes used for its resin.
