= Boswellia dioscoridis =

Conservation status
- Endangered (IUCN 3.1)

Scientific classification
- Kingdom: Plantae
- Clade: Tracheophytes
- Clade: Angiosperms
- Clade: Eudicots
- Clade: Rosids
- Order: Sapindales
- Family: Burseraceae
- Genus: Boswellia
- Species: B. dioscoridis

Binomial name
- Boswellia dioscoridis Thulin

Species of flowering plant

Boswellia dioscoridis is a species of plant in the family Burseraceae. It is endemic to the island of Socotra in Yemen. Its natural habitats are subtropical or tropical dry forests and rocky areas.
