= Boswellia papyrifera =

Scientific classification
- Kingdom: Plantae
- Clade: Tracheophytes
- Clade: Angiosperms
- Clade: Eudicots
- Clade: Rosids
- Order: Sapindales
- Family: Burseraceae
- Genus: Boswellia
- Species: B. papyrifera

Binomial name
- Boswellia papyrifera (Delile ex Caill.) Hochst., 1843

Synonyms
- Amyris papyrifera Delile ex Caill.; Boswellia occidentalis Engl.

Species of African plant commonly used for incense

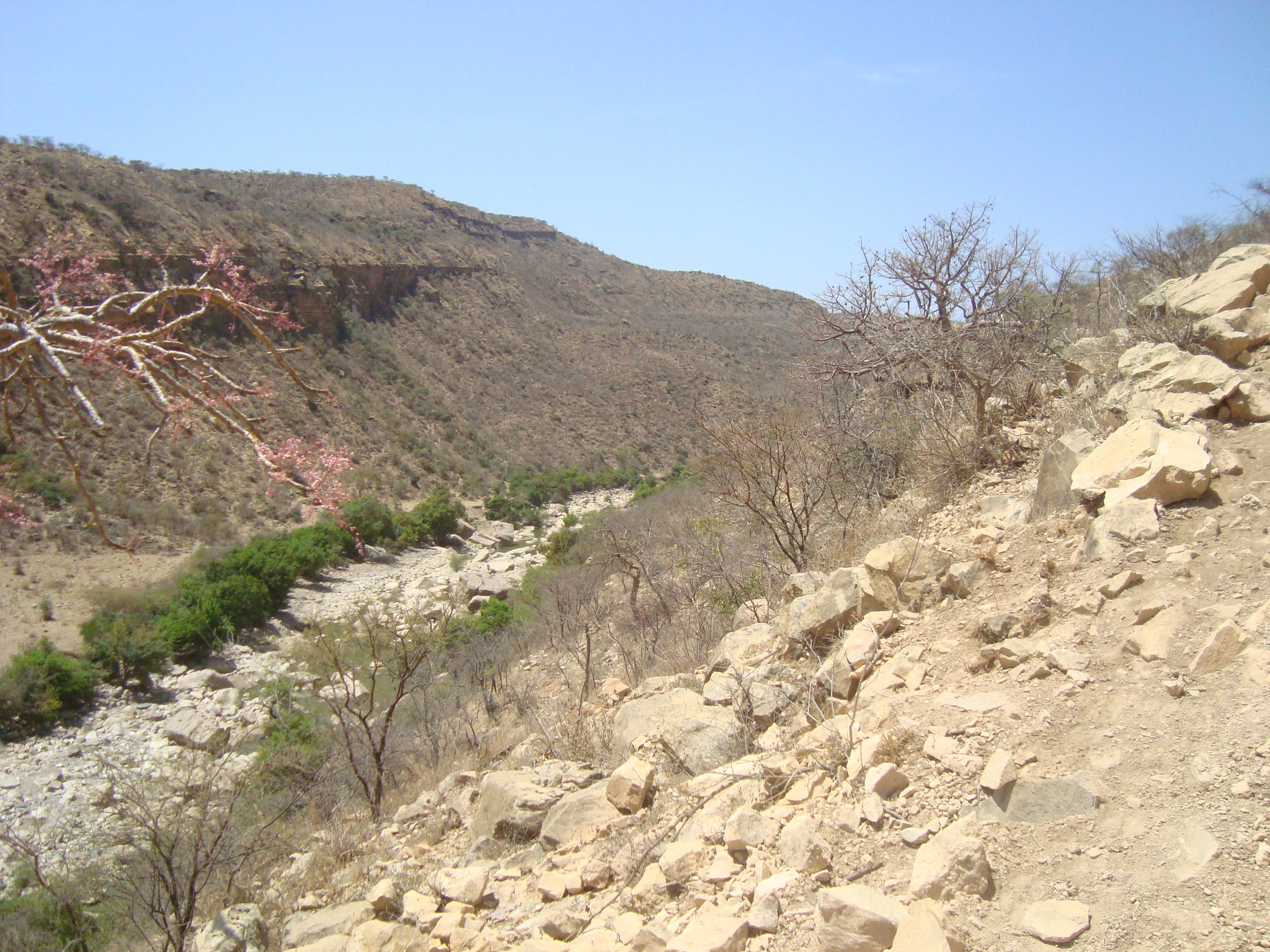
Typical habitat (Giba River gorge in Ethiopia) with, at left, a flowering Boswellia papyrifera tree

Boswellia papyrifera, also known as the Sudanese frankincense, is a species of flowering plant and frankincense that is native to Ethiopia, Eritrea and Sudan. The tree is cultivated in Ethiopia because of its valuable resin. The incense is characterized by a fresh lemon-pine scent and is therefore highly esteemed. In Ethiopia where it is called itan zaf, it comes in semi-translucent yellow tears. The gum resin of Boswellia papyrifera coming from Ethiopia, Sudan and eastern Africa is believed to be the main source of frankincense of antiquity.

== Chemical constituents ==
In studies conducted on the chemical properties of the oleo-gum resin of B. papyrifera, it was shown to contain a high concentration of octyl acetate (57.1–65.7%) and N-octanol (3.4–8.8%), the former accounting for its citric note. The species also contain diterpenes and nortriterpenes; the methanol extracts specifically consisting of the following diterpenes: incensole, incensyl acetate and verticilla-4(20),7,11-triene). It also contained the following triterpenes: β-amyrin, α-amyrin, β-amyrenone, and α-amyrenone. The oleogum resin also contained nortriterpenes (24-noroleana-3,12-diene and 24-norursa-3,12-diene) and α-boswellic acid.
