= Cembrene A =

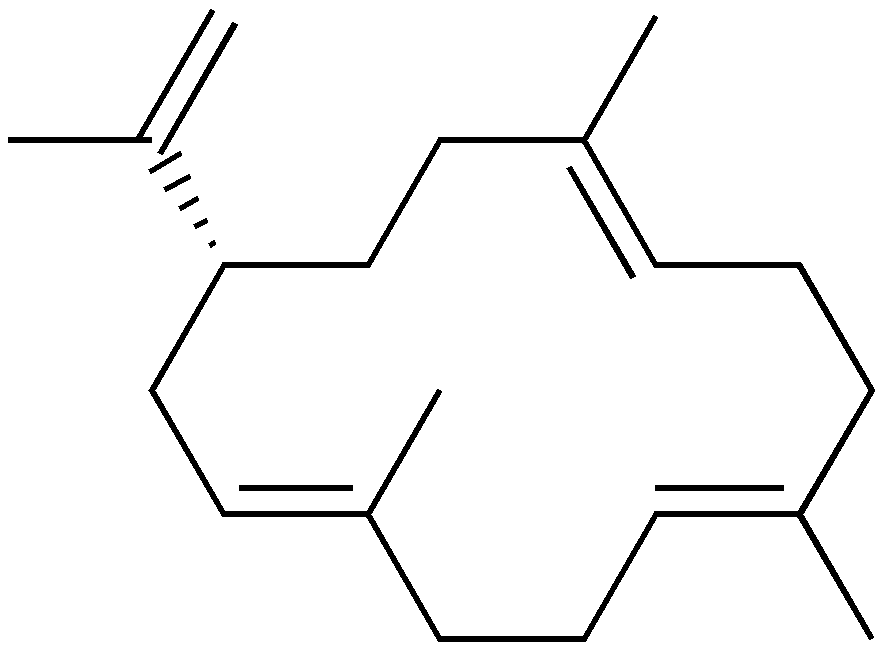
- Cembrene A

Names
- Preferred IUPAC name (1E,5E,9E,12R)-1,5,9-Trimethyl-12-(prop-1-en-2-yl)cyclotetradeca-1,5,9-triene
- Other names (R,1E,5E,9E)-1,5,9-Trimethyl-12-(prop-1-en-2-yl)cyclotetradeca-1,5,9-triene; Neocembrene-A

Identifiers
CAS Number	31570-39-5
3D model (JSmol)	Interactive image
ChEBI	CHEBI:82800
ChEMBL	ChEMBL518765
ChemSpider	4444741
PubChem CID	5281384
UNII	2WGK4P4230
- InChI: InChI=1/C20H32/c1-16(2)20-14-12-18(4)10-6-8-17(3)9-7-11-19(5)13-15-20/h8,11-12,20H,1,6-7,9-10,13-15H2,2-5H3/b17-8+,18-12+,19-11+/t20-/m0/s1 Key: VWSPQDDPRITBAM-KPGNMOGWBK
- SMILES: C1(=C\CC/C(=C/C[C@H](C(=C)\C)CCC(=C\CC1)\C)C)\C

Properties
Chemical formula	C_{20}H_{32}
Molar mass	272.47 g/mol
Boiling point	150 to 152 °C (302 to 306 °F; 423 to 425 K) at 0.8 mmHg
- Except where otherwise noted, data are given for materials in their standard state (at 25 °C [77 °F], 100 kPa). Infobox references

Cembrene A, or sometimes neocembrene, is a natural monocyclic diterpene isolated from corals of the genus Nephthea. It is a colorless oil with a faint wax-like odor.

Cembrene A is a trail pheromone for termites; however, the chemical structure of cembrene is central to a very wide variety of other natural products found both in plants and in animals. Pinus leucodermis tree bark and wood essential oils contain a high percentage of cembrene.

Cembrenes are biosynthesized by macrocyclization of geranylgeranyl pyrophosphate.
