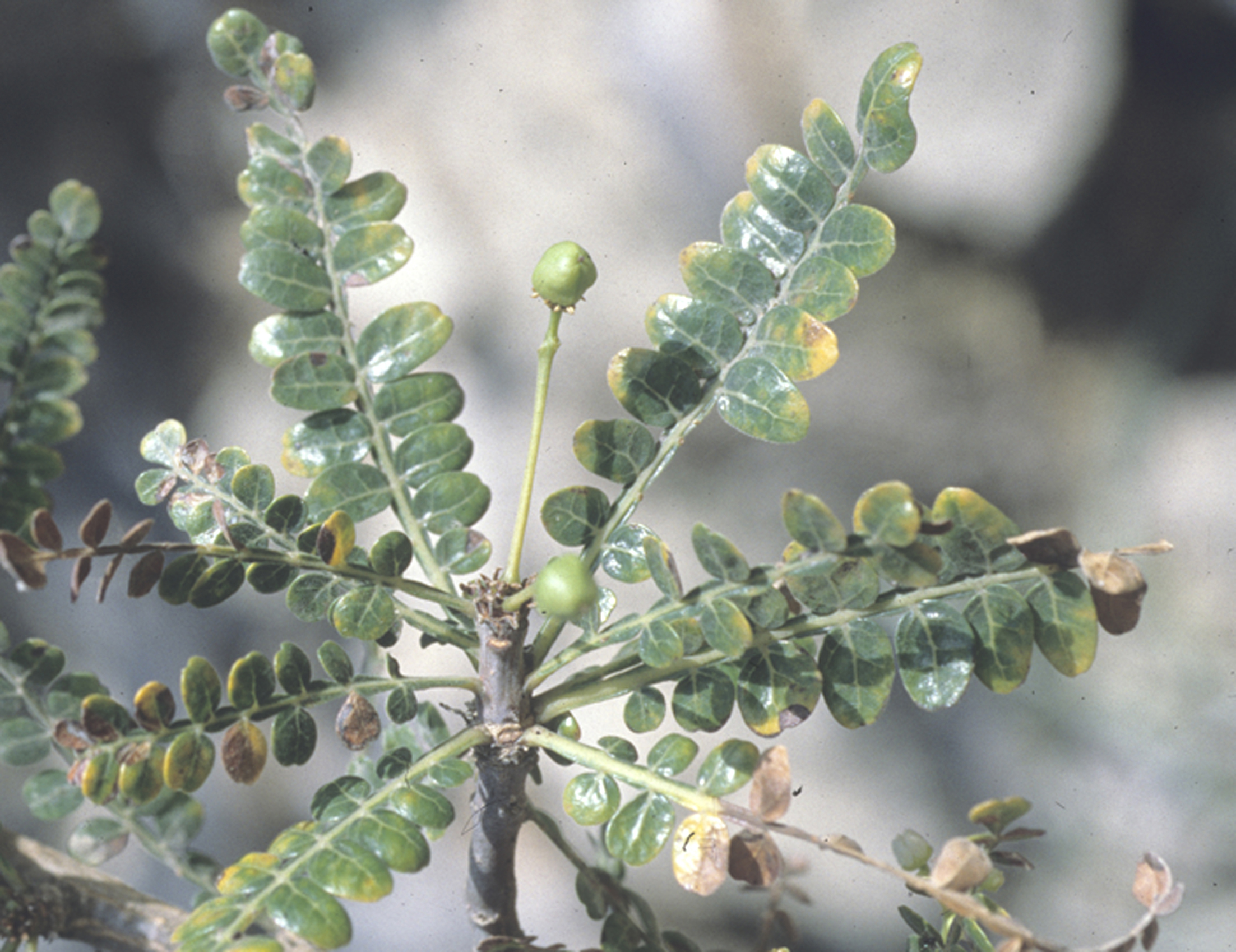

Conservation status
- Vulnerable (IUCN 3.1)

Scientific classification
- Kingdom: Plantae
- Clade: Tracheophytes
- Clade: Angiosperms
- Clade: Eudicots
- Clade: Rosids
- Order: Sapindales
- Family: Burseraceae
- Genus: Boswellia
- Species: B. socotrana

Binomial name
- Boswellia socotrana Balf.f.

Synonyms
- Lannea aspleniifolia (Balf.f.) Engl. Odina aspleniifolia Balf.f.

= Boswellia socotrana =

Species of flowering plant

Boswellia socotrana is a species of plant in the Burseraceae family. It is endemic to Socotra, Yemen. Its natural habitats are subtropical or tropical dry forests and subtropical or tropical dry shrubland.
