= Boswellia popoviana =

Conservation status
- Vulnerable (IUCN 3.1)

Scientific classification
- Kingdom: Plantae
- Clade: Tracheophytes
- Clade: Angiosperms
- Clade: Eudicots
- Clade: Rosids
- Order: Sapindales
- Family: Burseraceae
- Genus: Boswellia
- Species: B. popoviana

Binomial name
- Boswellia popoviana Hepper

Species of flowering plant

Boswellia popoviana is a species of plant in the Burseraceae family. It is endemic to Socotra in Yemen. Its natural habitats are subtropical or tropical dry forests and rocky areas.
