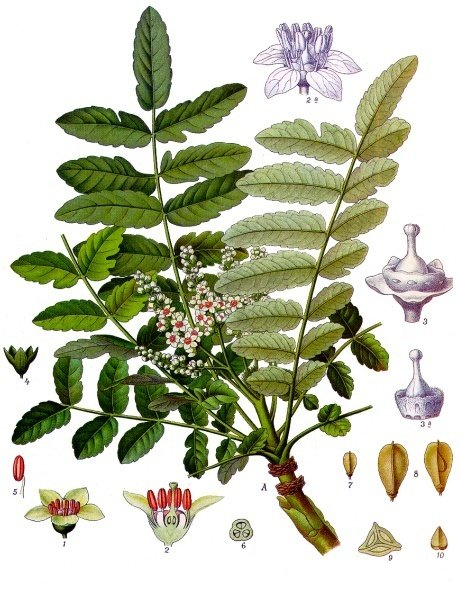

Scientific classification
- Kingdom: Plantae
- Clade: Embryophytes
- Clade: Tracheophytes
- Clade: Angiosperms
- Clade: Eudicots
- Clade: Rosids
- Order: Sapindales
- Family: Burseraceae
- Genus: Boswellia; Roxb. ex Colebr.

Species
- see Text

Synonyms
- Libanotus Stackh. in De Liban: 13 (1814), nom. superfl.; Libanus Colebr. in Asiat. Res. 9: 382 (1807), not validly publ.; Ploesslia Endl. in S.L.Endlicher & E.Fenzl, Nov. Stirp. Dec.: 38 (1839)

= Boswellia =

Genus of flowering plants

Boswellia is a genus of trees in the family Burseraceae, known for its fragrant resin. The biblical incense frankincense is an extract from the resin of the tree Boswellia sacra, and is now produced also from B. frereana. Boswellia species are moderate-sized flowering plants, including both trees and shrubs.

== Description ==
Boswellia species are dioecious, or hermaphroditic. The flowers may have four or five faintly connate but imbricate sepals with an equal number of distinct, imbricate petals. Also, the stamens, that may contain nectar discs, have distinct glabrous filaments that occur in one or two whorls and in numbers equaling or twice the number of petals; the tricolporate pollen is contained within two locules of the anthers that open longitudinally along slits. The gynoecium contains three to five connate carpels, one style, and one stigma that is head-like to lobed. Each locule of the superior ovary has two ovules with axile placentation that are anatropous to campylotropous. The one- to five-pitted fruit is a drupe that opens at maturity. The endosperm is usually lacking in the embryo.

== Taxonomy ==
The genus name honours British botanist John Boswell, 1710–1780 (incidentally, uncle of writer James Boswell).

The genus was first published in Asiat. Res. 9 on page 379 in 1807.

== Species ==
As accepted by Plants of the World Online;

- B. ameero Balf.f.
- B. asplenifolia (Balf.f.) Thulin
- B. bullata Thulin
- B. dalzielii Hutch.
- B. dioscoridis Thulin
- B. elongata Balf.f.
- B. frereana Birdw.
- B. globosa Thulin
- B. microphylla Chiov.
- B. nana Hepper
- B. neglecta S.Moore
- B. occulta Thulin, DeCarlo & S.P.Johnson
- B. ogadensis Vollesen
- B. ovalifoliolata N.P.Balakr. & A.N.Henry
- B. papyrifera (Del.) Hochst.
- B. pirottae Chiov.
- B. popoviana Hepper
- B. rivae Engl.
- B. ruspoliana Engl.
- B. sacra Flueck.
- B. serrata Roxb. ex Colebr. (type)
- B. socotrana Balf.f.

World Flora Online only accepts 20 species; B. ameero, B. bullata, B. carteri Birdw., B. dalzielii, B. dioscoridis, B. elongata, B. frereana, B. globosa, B. microphylla, B. nana, B. neglecta, B. ogadensis, B. ovalifoliolata, B. papyrifera, B. pirottae, B. popoviana, B. rivae, B. sacra, B. serrata and B. socotrana.

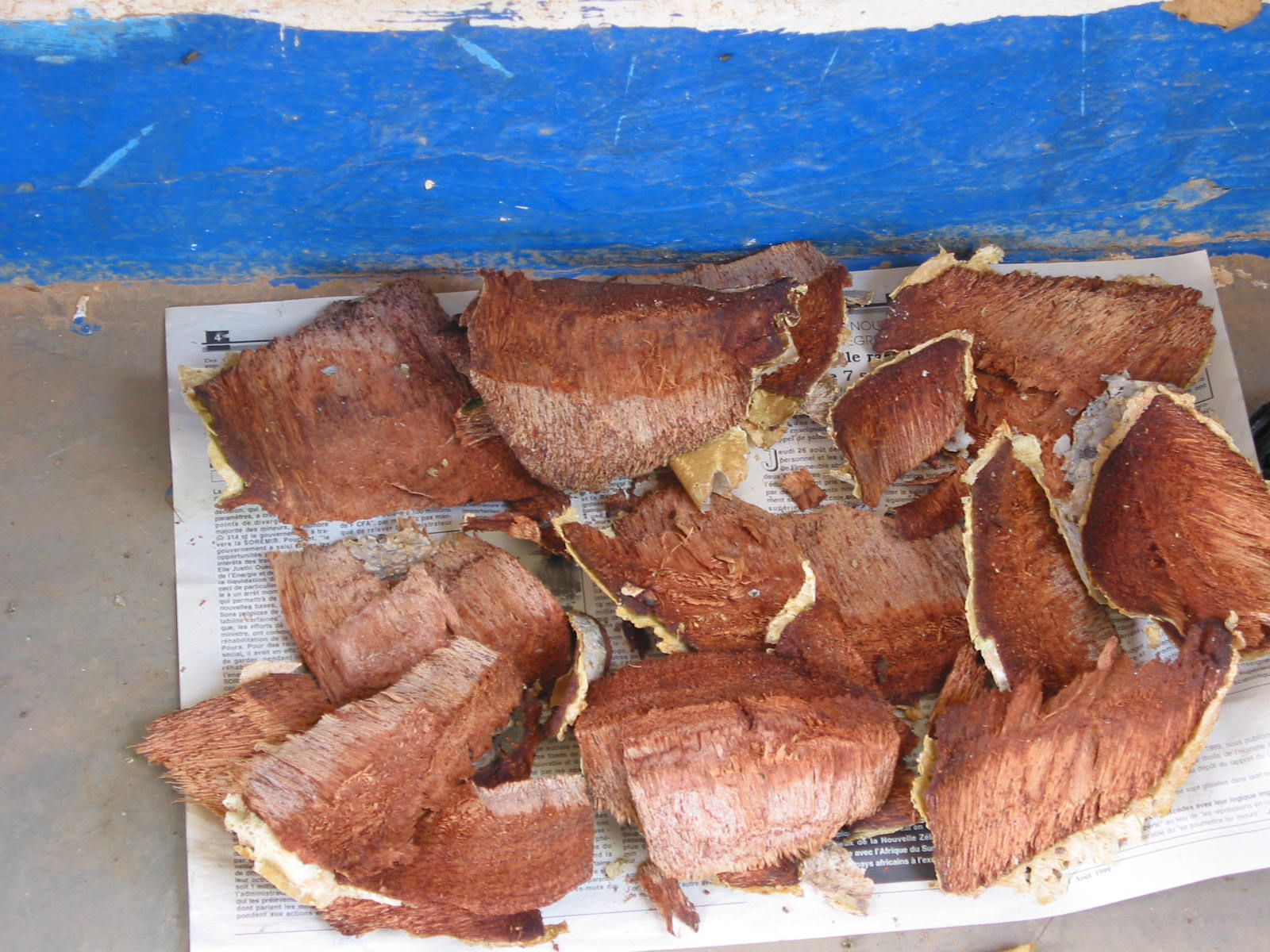
Boswellia dalzielii bark

== Distribution ==
The genus is native to tropical regions of Africa and Asia. The distributions of the species are primarily associated with the tropics. The greatest diversity of species presently is in Africa and India. They are native to the countries (and regions) of Benin, Burkina, Cameroon, Central African Republic, Chad, Eritrea, Ethiopia, Ghana, India, Ivory Coast, Kenya, Mali, Niger, Nigeria, Oman, Senegal, (island of) Socotra, Somalia, Sudan, Tanzania, Togo, Uganda, West Himalaya and Yemen.

== Ecological status ==
In 1998, the International Union for Conservation of Nature (IUCN) warned that one of the primary frankincense species, Boswellia sacra, is "near threatened". Frankincense trees are not covered by the Convention on International Trade in Endangered Species of Wild Fauna and Flora, but experts argue that Boswellia species meet the criteria for protection. In a 2006 study, an ecologist at Wageningen University & Research claimed that, by the late-1990s, Boswellia papyrifera trees in Eritrea were becoming hard to find. In 2019, a new paper predicted a 50% reduction in Boswellia papyrifera within the next two decades. This species, found mainly in Ethiopia, Eritrea, and Sudan, accounts for about two-thirds of global frankincense production. The paper warns that all Boswellia species are threatened by habitat loss and overexploitation. Most Boswellia grow in harsh, arid regions beset by poverty and conflict. Harvesting and selling the tree's resin is one of the only sources of income for the inhabitants, resulting in overtapping.

== Frankincense ==
The four main species of Boswellia, B. sacra (synonyms B. carteri and B. bhaw-dajiana), B. frereana, B. papyrifera, and B. serrata, produce true frankincense, and each type of resin is available in various grades. The grades depend on the time of harvesting, and the resin is hand sorted for quality.

== Usage ==
Among the pentacyclic triterpenes, several boswellic acids such as β-boswellic acid, acetyl-β-boswellic acid, 11-keto-β-boswellic acid (KBA), and acetyl-11-keto-β-boswellic acid (AKBA) have been identified as major bioactive constituents and are frequently investigated in pharmacological studies.

Modern laboratory and clinical research has explored Boswellia extracts for possible anti-inflammatory effects and their relevance to inflammatory and neuroinflammatory disorders; however, the strength and consistency of clinical evidence vary across indications and study designs. There is insufficient evidence to determine whether Boswellia is indicated for any health condition.

=== Standardized extracts ===
Several standardized Boswellia serrata extracts have been developed to provide defined concentrations of boswellic acids, including K-Vie, which is a micronized Boswellia serrata extract standardized to 40% boswellic acids developed by KondorPharma that has been referenced in some published clinical investigations.
