= List of rivers of Mexico =

This is a list of rivers of Mexico, listed from north to south. There are 246 rivers on this list. Alternate names for rivers are given in parentheses.

== Rivers flowing into the Gulf of Mexico ==
- Río Bravo, the name of the Rio Grande in Mexico
  - San Juan River
    - Pesquería River
      - Salinas River
  - Salado River
    - Sabinas Hidalgo River
    - Candela River
    - Sabinas River
  - Conchos River
    - Chuviscar River
      - Sacramento River
    - San Pedro River
    - Florida River
      - Parral River
    - Balleza River (San Juan River)
- San Fernando River (Conchos River)
- Soto La Marina River (Santander River)
  - Purificación River
- Pánuco River
  - Tamesí River (Guayalejo River)
  - Chicayán River
  - Santa Maria River (Tamuín River) (Tampoán River)
    - Río Verde
  - Moctezuma River
    - Tempoal River
    - Amajac River
    - Extoraz River
    - Tula River
- Tuxpan Ver (Tuxpan River)
  - Pantepec River
  - Vinazco River
- Cazones River
- Tecolutla River
  - Necaxa River
- Nautla River
  - Bobos River
- Actopan River
- Antigua River (Pescados River)
- Jamapa River
  - Cotaxtla River (Atoyac River)
- Blanco River (Río Blanco)
- Papaloapan River
  - San Juan River
    - Lalana River
    - Trinidad River
  - Tesechoacan River
    - Playa Vicente River
  - Tonto River
    - Amapa River
  - Santo Domingo River
    - Salado River (Zapotitlán River)
    - Río Grande
  - Valle Nacional River
- Coatzacoalcos River
  - Uspanapa River (Uxpanapa River)
  - Jaltepec River
  - Sarabia River
  - El Corte River
- Tonalá River (Pedregal River)
- Grijalva River (Tabasco River) (Río Chiapa)
  - Usumacinta River
    - San Pedro y San Pablo River (distributary)
    - Palizada River (distributary)
    - San Pedro River
    - Lacantún River
      - Jataté River
      - Tzaconejá River
    - Salinas River (Chixoy River)
  - Tulija River
  - Chilapa River
  - Tacotalpa River
    - Teapa River
  - La Venta River
    - Encajonado River
  - Suchiapa River
  - Santo Domingo River
  - Cuilco River
- Chumpan River
- Candelaria River
  - Mamantel River
- Champotón River
- Hondo River
  - Blue Creek

== Rivers flowing into the Pacific Ocean ==
- Tijuana River
  - Las Palmas River
- San Vicente River
- San Antonio River
- Del Rosario River
- San Andres River
- Soledad River
- Arroyo Salado River
- Colorado River
  - Hardy River
  - Gila River
    - Santa Cruz River
    - San Pedro River
- Sonoyta River
- Concepción River (Magdalena River)
  - Altar River
- Sonora River
  - San Miguel River (Horcasitas River)
- Mátape River (Malapo River)
- Yaqui River
  - Moctezuma River
  - Sahuaripa River
  - Bavispe River (Bavisque River)
    - Rio San Bernardino
      - Rio Fronteras
        - Rio Agua Prieta
      - Arroyo Cajón Bonito
  - Aros River
    - Mulatos River
    - Tutuaca River
    - Sirupa River
      - Tomochic River
      - Papigochic River
- Mayo River
- Fuerte River
  - Rio Cuchujaqui
  - Choix River
  - Río Verde, a.k.a. San Miguel River, Sinforeza River
    - Urique River
      - San Ignacio River, a.k.a. Recowata River
    - Batopilas River
  - Chínipas River
    - Septentrion River
      - Cerocahui River
    - Oteros River
      - Uruachi River
    - Tepochique River
      - Mochomo River
        - Huachajuri River
          - Arroyo Monterde
- Sinaloa River (Mohinora River)
- Culiacán River
  - Humaya River
  - Tamazula River
- San Lorenzo River
- Piaxtla River
  - Elota River
- Presidio River
- Baluarte River
- Teacapan Estuary
  - Acaponeta River
- Río San Pedro Mezquital
  - Animas River
- Río Grande de Santiago
  - Mololoa River
  - Huaynamota River (Jesús María River)
    - Atengo River (Chapalagana River)
      - Huajimic River
      - Camotlán River
  - Bolaños River
    - Colotlán River
      - Jerez River
    - Mezquitic River
  - Juchipila River
    - Calvillo River
  - Río Verde (Río San Pedro)
    - Los Lagos River
  - Calderón River
  - Lake Chapala
    - Lerma River
      - Turbio River
      - Guanajuato River
      - Apaseo River
        - Laja River
    - Zula River
    - Huaracha River
    - Duero River
- Ameca River
  - Mascota River
  - Atenguillo River
  - Remus River
- Tomatlán River
- San Nicolás River
- Purificación River
- Chacala River (Cihuatlán River)
- Armería River (Ayuquila River) (Ayutla River)
- Tuxpan River (Coahuayana River)
- Coalcomán River
- Aguililla River
- Balsas River (Mezcala River) (Atoyac River)
  - Tepalcatepec River (Río Grande)
    - Cupatitzio River (Del Marques River)
  - Río del Oro
  - Cutzamala River
    - Ixtapan River
    - Temascaltepec River
    - Bejucos River
  - Amacuzac River
    - Yautepec River
  - Tlapaneco River
  - Nexapa River
  - Mixteco River
    - Acatlán River
  - San Martín River
  - Zahuapan River
- Atoyac River
- Papagayo River
  - Omitlán River
- Ometepec River
  - Quetzala River
- Río Verde
  - Atoyac River
  - Atoyaquillo River (Putla River)
- Colotepec River
- Copalita River
- Tehuantepec River (Quiechapa River)
  - Tequisistlán River
- Suchiate River

== Endorheic basins ==
- Salton Sea in California
  - New River (Río Nuevo)
- Guzmán Basin in northern Chihuahua
  - Casas Grandes River
  - Santa Maria River
  - Carmen River (Santa Clara River)
- Bolsón de Mapimí
  - Aguanaval River
    - Trujillo River
  - Nazas River (Río del Oro)
    - Sextín River
    - Ramos River (Santiago River)
      - Tepehuanes River

== See also ==
- List of rivers of the Americas by coastline
