= Mexican South Pacific Coast mangroves =

Ecoregion in Mexico

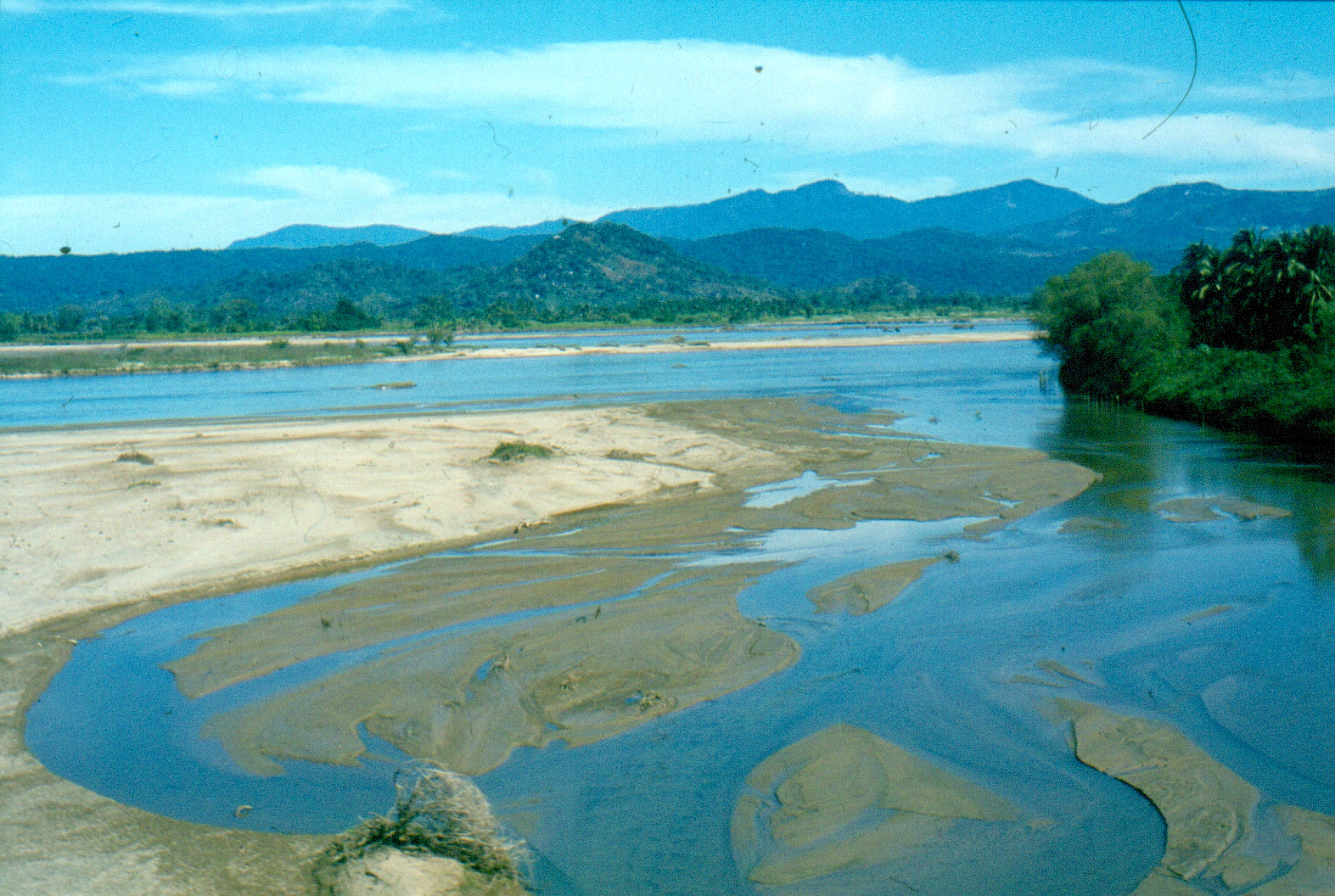
- Lagunas de Chacahua National Park on the coast of Oaxaca, Mexico

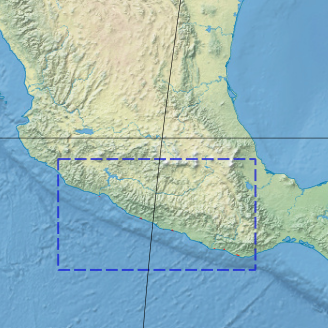
- Ecoregion territory (in red, inside box)

Ecology
- Realm: Neotropic
- Biome: Mangroves

Geography
- Area: 1,295 km^{2} (500 sq mi)
- Country: Mexico
- Coordinates: 15.9°N 97.1°W

The Mexican South Pacific Coast mangroves ecoregion (WWF ID: NT1422) covers the mangrove sites along the coast of the Pacific Ocean coast of Mexico, across the states of Michoacán, Guerrero, and Oaxaca. These mangrove forests are mostly around lagoons, typically those fed by rivers from the interior in the Sierra Madre del Sur Mountains. The ecoregion is small: collectively, it covers only 1,295 km2.

== Location and description ==
The ecoregion stretches across 1,000 km of the coast, primarily around the margins of river deltas and lagoons. Major mangrove sites are found at:

- Lázaro Cárdenas, in the state of Michoacán at the mouth of the Balsas River. A RAMSAR wetland of international importance. This are affected by the port of Lázaro Cárdenas, the largest seaport in Mexico.
- Zihuatanejo, a city on the coast of Guerrero
- Barra de Potosí, a lagoon behind a small fishing village in the municipality of Petatlán
- San Luis de la Loma, a town on the coast in the municipality of Tecpan de Galeana
- Atoyac de Álvarez, a town behind two coastal lagoons in Guerrero
- Puerto Marqués, 10 km south of Acapulco
- Papagayo River delta, and nearby lagoons
- Ometepec River delta and nearby lagoons
- Laguna de Corralero on the coast of the municipality of Pinotepa Nacional in Oaxaca
- Lagunas de Chacahua National Park, at the mouth of the Río Verde (Oaxaca)
- Lagoons north and south of Puerto Escondido in Oaxaca
- The coastal strip south of Salina Cruz

== Climate ==
The climate of the ecoregion is Tropical savanna climate - dry winter (Köppen climate classification (Aw)). This climate is characterized by relatively even temperatures throughout the year, and a pronounced dry season. The driest month has less than 60 mm of precipitation, and is drier than the average month.

== Flora and fauna ==
The characteristic trees species are red mangrove (Rhizophora mangle), white mangrove (Laguncularia racemosa), black mangrove (Avicennia germinans) and buttonwood (Conocarpus erectus). Aquatic plants in the lagoons include water hyacinth (Eichhornia).

== Protected areas ==
Officially protected areas in the ecoregion include:

- Lagunas de Chacahua National Park
