= Hurricane Marie (2014) =

Category 5 Pacific hurricane in 2014

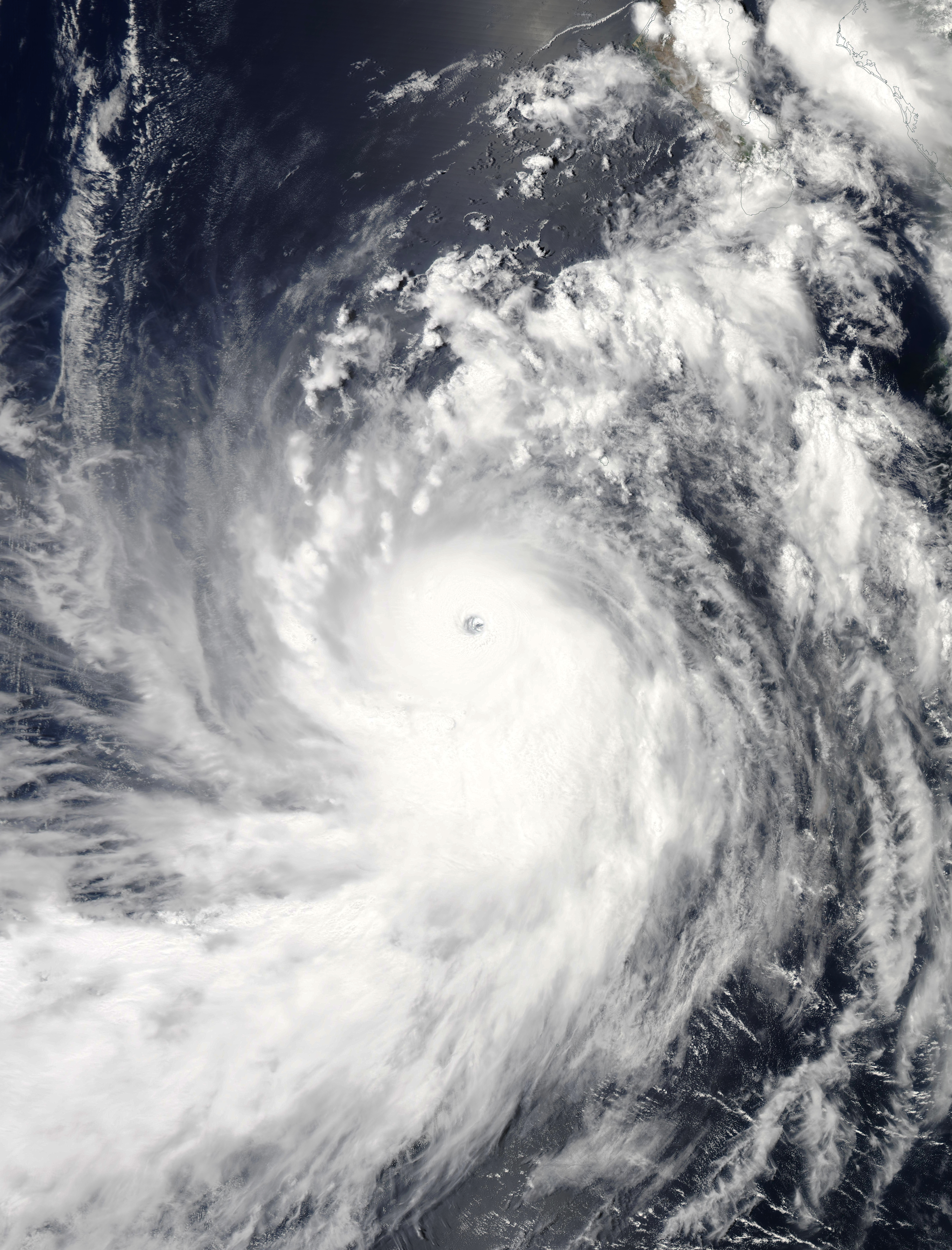
- Hurricane Marie at peak intensity off the Mexican coast on August 24

Meteorological history
- Formed: August 22, 2014
- Remnant low: August 28, 2014
- Dissipated: September 2, 2014

Category 5 major hurricane
- 1-minute sustained (SSHWS/NWS)
- Highest winds: 160 mph (260 km/h)
- Lowest pressure: 918 mbar (hPa); 27.11 inHg

Overall effects
- Fatalities: 6 total
- Damage: $20 million (2014 USD)
- Areas affected: Southwestern Mexico, California
- IBTrACS
- Part of the 2014 Pacific hurricane season

Hurricane Marie is tied as the eighth-most intense Pacific hurricane on record, attaining a barometric pressure of 918 mbar (hPa; 27.11 inHg) in August 2014. The fourteenth named storm, ninth hurricane, and sixth major hurricane of the season, Marie began as a tropical wave that emerged off the west coast of Africa over the Atlantic Ocean on August 10. Some organization of shower and thunderstorm activity initially took place, but dry air soon impinged upon the system and imparted weakening. The wave tracked westward across the Atlantic and Caribbean for several days. On August 19, an area of low pressure consolidated within the wave west of Central America. With favorable atmospheric conditions, convective activity and banding features increased around the system and by August 22, the system acquired enough organization to be classified as Tropical Depression Thirteen-E while situated about 370 mi (595 km) south-southeast of Acapulco, Mexico. Development was initially fast-paced, as the depression acquired tropical storm-force winds within six hours of formation and hurricane-force by August 23. However, due to some vertical wind shear its intensification rate stalled, and for a time it remained a Category 1 hurricane on the Saffir–Simpson hurricane wind scale.

On August 24, Marie developed an eye and rapidly intensified to a Category 5 hurricane with winds of 160 mph (260 km/h). (Note: All winds are one-minute sustained unless otherwise noted.) At its peak, the hurricane's gale-force winds spanned an area 575 mi (925 km) across. Marie subsequently underwent an eyewall replacement cycle on August 25 which prompted steady weakening. Over the next several days, Marie progressively degraded to below hurricane strength as it moved into an increasingly hostile environment with cooler waters and a more stable atmosphere. On August 29, after having lost all signs of organized deep convection, Marie degenerated into a remnant low. The large system gradually wound down over the following several days, with winds subsiding below gale-force on August 30. The remnant cyclone eventually lost a well defined center and dissipated on September 2 about 1,200 mi (1,950 km) northeast of Hawaii.

Although Marie's center remained well away from land throughout its entire existence, its large size brought increased surf to areas from Southwestern Mexico northward to southern California. Off the coast of Los Cabos, three people drowned after their boat capsized in rough seas. In Colima and Oaxaca, heavy rains from outer bands caused flooding, resulting in two fatalities. Similar effects were felt across Baja California Sur. Toward the end of August, Marie brought one of the largest hurricane-related surf events to southern California in decades. Swells of 10 to 15 ft (3.0 to 4.6 m) battered coastal areas, with structural damage occurring on Santa Catalina Island and in the Greater Los Angeles Area. A breakwater near Long Beach sustained $10 million worth of damage, with portions gouged out. One person drowned in the surf near Malibu. Hundreds of ocean rescues, including over 100 in Malibu alone, were attributed to the storm, and overall losses reached $20 million. (Note: All monetary values are in 2014 United States dollars unless otherwise noted.)

== Meteorological history ==
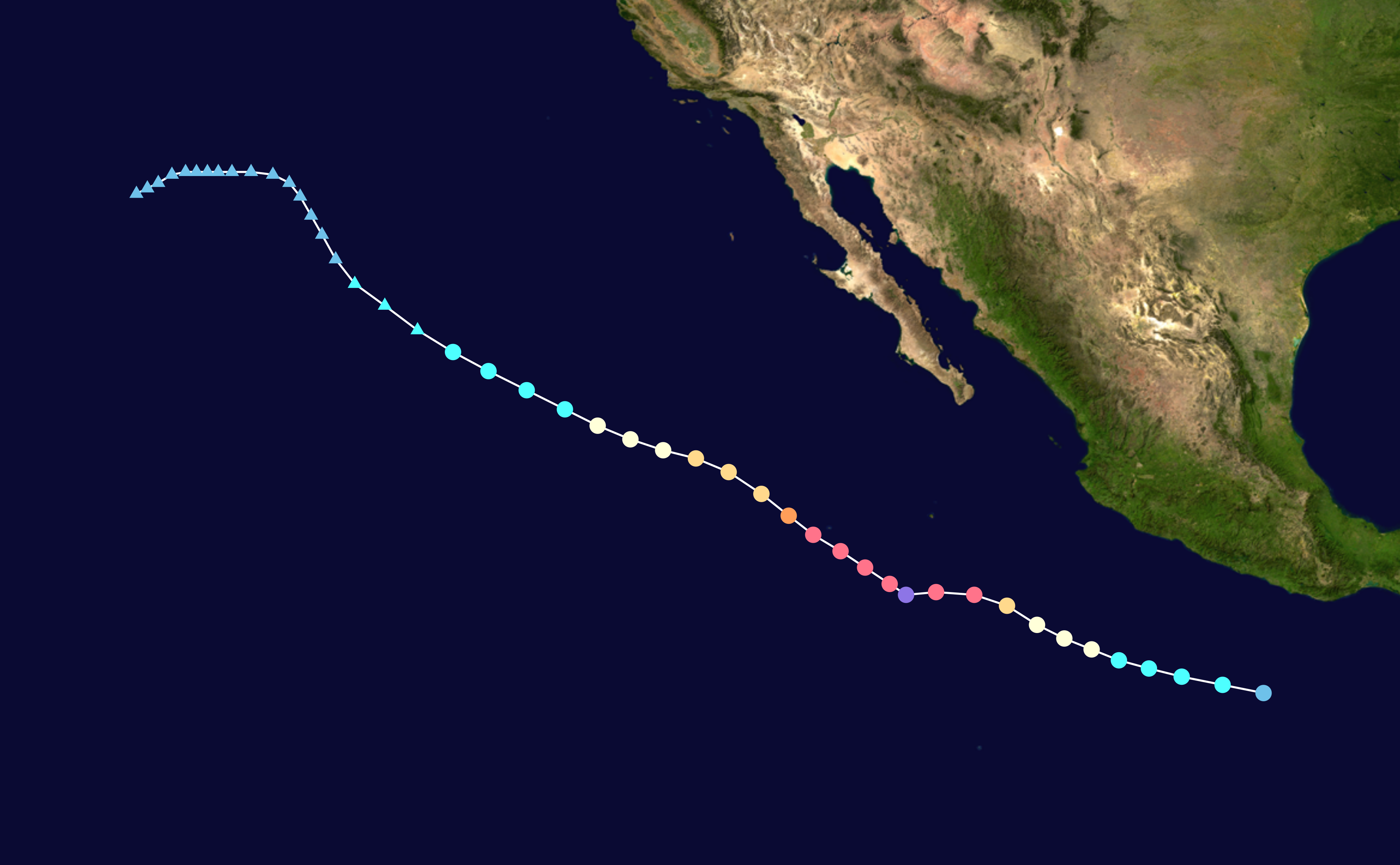
Map plotting the storm's track and intensity, according to the Saffir–Simpson scale Map key Saffir–Simpson scale Tropical depression (≤38 mph, ≤62 km/h) Tropical storm (39–73 mph, 63–118 km/h) Category 1 (74–95 mph, 119–153 km/h) Category 2 (96–110 mph, 154–177 km/h) Category 3 (111–129 mph, 178–208 km/h) Category 4 (130–156 mph, 209–251 km/h) Category 5 (≥157 mph, ≥252 km/h) Unknown Storm type Tropical cyclone Subtropical cyclone Extratropical cyclone, remnant low, tropical disturbance, or monsoon depression

On August 10, the National Hurricane Center (NHC) (Note: The National Hurricane Center is the Regional Specialized Meteorological Center for the northeast Pacific Ocean from the coast of Central America west until 140°W.) began monitoring a westward moving tropical wave emerging off the west coast of Africa, centered along 16°W. Accompanied by disorganized convective activity, development, if any, was expected to be slow. A broad area of low pressure subsequently formed within the wave about halfway between Africa and the Cape Verde Islands. Embedded within an elongated trough, the weak system struggled to organize and convection soon diminished. Interaction with a monsoon trough reinvigorated shower and thunderstorm activity on August 11 across a large area southwest of the Cape Verde Islands, but the surface low had dissipated by this time. Development was no longer expected over the following days as dry air created a hostile area for storm organization. The wave continued westward across the Atlantic and entered the Caribbean on August 16. Subsequent interactions with South America and an upper-level trough inhibited improvement of the system.

Beginning on August 17, the NHC anticipated that a low-pressure area would form within five days to the south of the Gulf of Tehuantepec in the East Pacific, with a 30% chance of tropical cyclogenesis. By the next day, the wave was located over Panama, and the NHC upgraded the potential for development to 60%. The wave crossed into the eastern Pacific with accompanying convection, developing a low-pressure area on August 19. Conditions were favorable for further development, and the thunderstorms increased and became better organized on August 20. After an increase in rainbands and outflow around the well-defined center, the NHC classified the system as Tropical Depression Thirteen-E early on August 22 about 370 mi (595 km) south-southeast of Acapulco, Mexico. A strong ridge over the southern United States, later expanding into northern Mexico, steered the system on a west-northwest course throughout its existence as a tropical cyclone.

Most intense Pacific hurricanes
Rank	Hurricane	Season	Pressure	
Rank	Hurricane	Season	hPa	inHg
1	Patricia	2015	872	25.75
2	Polo	2026	892	26.34
3	Linda	1997	902	26.64
4	Rick	2009	906	26.76
5	Kenna	2002	913	26.96
6	Ava	1973	915	27.02
6	Ioke	2006	915	27.02
8	Marie	2014	918	27.11
8	Odile	2014	918	27.11
10	Guillermo	1997	919	27.14
Listing is only for tropical cyclones in the Pacific Ocean north of the equator and east of the International Dateline

Conditions were favorable for the nascent depression to strengthen. The Statistical Hurricane Intensity Prediction Scheme model predicted the system would become a Category 4 on the Saffir–Simpson hurricane wind scale when the system was only a tropical depression. Only six hours after the NHC issued its first advisory the agency upgraded the depression to Tropical Storm Marie, the thirteenth named storm of the 2014 season. The storm very quickly organized, developing a central dense overcast consisting of intense convection; this was aided by warm water temperatures and low wind shear. On August 23, the NHC upgraded Marie to hurricane status, and an eye began forming later that day. On the next day, as the storm rapidly intensified, the eye became much more distinct and was surrounded by a powerful eyewall. During this phase the storm wobbled, shifting due west before resuming its previous motion. At 18:00 UTC on August 24, Marie attained Category 5 status on the Saffir–Simpson hurricane wind scale, the first such Pacific hurricane since Celia in 2010. The NHC estimated peak sustained winds of 160 mph (260 km/h), based on a Dvorak T-number of 7.0 provided by TAFB and SAB. They also estimated Marie's minimum barometric pressure at 918 mbar (hPa; 27.11 inHg), ranking as the seventh-strongest in the Pacific east of the International Date Line since records began in 1949. (Note: Although Marie ranks as the seventh-strongest since records began, records are only considered reliable since 1988.) Coincidentally, Hurricane Odile attained the same pressure just three weeks later. At its peak, Marie was a large hurricane with tropical storm-force winds covering an area 575 mi (925 km) across.

Shortly after Marie attained peak intensity, the convection weakened due to an eyewall replacement cycle, in which an outer eye formed. The storm also weakened due to gradually decreasing water temperatures. By early on August 26, the eye became much less defined. The double eye feature persisted through that day, although the outer eyewall opened up as thunderstorms weakened further. Late on August 27, Marie weakened to tropical storm status, by which time the circulation became exposed from the convection. A strengthening ridge near California caused the storm to accelerate more to the west-northwest, into an area of cooler waters and dry air. Failing to produce any additional convection, Marie degenerated into a remnant low late on August 28. The residual circulation gradually wound down as it continued northwest. Through August 29, the system continued to produce gale-force winds. Turning west and later west-southwest within a weak easterly flow, Marie slowly moved across the open Pacific while remaining a broad, weak cyclone. The former cyclone eventually lost a well-defined center and dissipated on September 2, about 1,200 mi (1,950 km) northeast of Hawaii.

== Preparations and impacts ==
=== Mexico ===
Although the core of Hurricane Marie remained well offshore, a "green" alert was issued for Guerrero and Oaxaca and a "blue" (minimal) alert was issued for Jalisco, Colima, Michoacán, and Chiapas. Heavy rains in Oaxaca triggered flooding and landslides, with the districts of Juquila and Pochutla being most affected. Five people were swept away by a swollen river; all were wounded but later rescued. A portion of Federal Highway 200 and a bridge were closed. Approximately 10,000 people were in need of assistance and a disaster declaration was requested for the state of Oaxaca. Storm surge in Colima destroyed four buildings and damaged ten more. Flooding along the Marabasco and San Nicolás rivers resulted in two fatalities. Minor flooding also occurred near Acapulco and in Colima where 16 ft (4.9 m) waves pounded the coast. In Guadalajara, numerous trees were downed and 12 shops were closed.

Off the coast of Los Cabos in Baja California Sur, large swells capsized a fishing boat with seven people aboard on August 25. Four were able to swim back to shore while the other three remained missing and were later presumed dead. Strong rain bands along the outer fringes of Hurricane Marie brought heavy rain to parts of the state. Landslides blocked several roads near Los Cabos while gusty winds downed trees and power lines. Owing to the dangerous conditions, all schools Los Cabos were closed on August 25.

=== United States ===
Large swells at "The Wedge" at Newport Beach, California

Owing to the size of Marie, increased surf was anticipated well north of the hurricane. High surf advisories were issued in California for the Greater Los Angeles Area. Forecasters at the local National Weather Service office warned residents in Los Angeles and Ventura counties could "potentially see the largest surf in recent years generated by a hurricane." Swells of 10 to 15 ft (3.0 to 4.6 m) were anticipated with the risk of coastal flooding and structural damage. Advisories were also issued for Orange and Santa Barbara counties. Surf in the region ultimately reached 20 ft (6.1 m) along south-facing shores while west-facing beaches only saw waves up to 8 ft (2.4 m).

The combination of large swells, high tide, and powerful south-to-north longshore currents impeded by the bight formed by the Palos Verdes Peninsula resulted in significant coastal flooding in Seal Beach. A four-block area of oceanfront property was affected; several apartments were left with inches of water on the ground floor. Severe beach erosion resulted in the loss of 10,000–20,000 yd^{3} (7,600–15,200 m^{3}) of sand; a state of emergency was declared to assist with restoration efforts. Near Malibu Pier, several surfers were caught in the rough swells and knocked into each other; one struck a rock, was knocked unconscious, and drowned. Malibu Pier itself sustained some damage and a lifeguard house built in the 1950s was destroyed. North of Malibu, one structure fell into the ocean. The Los Angeles County Fire Department assisted with over 115 ocean rescues on August 26. More than 170 rescues were made the following day, including 73 at the famous surfing spot "The Wedge" in Newport Beach.

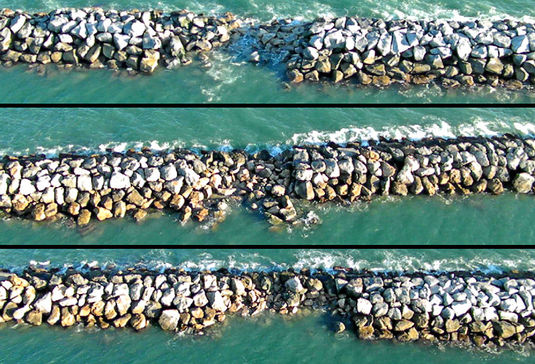
Breaches along the Middle Breakwater in Long Beach, California

Significant flooding also occurred in and around the Port of Long Beach. The Army Corps of Engineers was sent out to inspect significant damage to the middle breakwater at Long Beach. Eleven sections of the breakwater sustained major damage, including three areas which were completely gouged out. Along the 18,500 ft (5,600 m) breakwater, 1,550 ft (470 m) of it sustained major damage, 850 ft (260 m) saw significant damage, and a further 1,725 ft (526 m) experienced moderate damage. Several hundred tons of rock were estimated to have been dislodged by the storm. The nearby San Pedro and Long Beach breakwaters saw substantial damage as well, though not as severe as the middle breakwater. Debris from the Navy Mole breakwater damaged a roadway near the Sea Launch Commander, within Long Beach. The breach resulted in roughly $3 million in damage to nearby terminals. Two barges and a pleasure craft were loosed from their anchors by the surging waves and had to be towed back. Two terminals had to close due to dangerous conditions for workers. Less than two weeks after Marie, Hurricane Norbert threatened to bring further increased surf to the area. With the breakwater yet to be repaired, a large sand berm was reinforced along beaches and residents were supplied with sandbags.

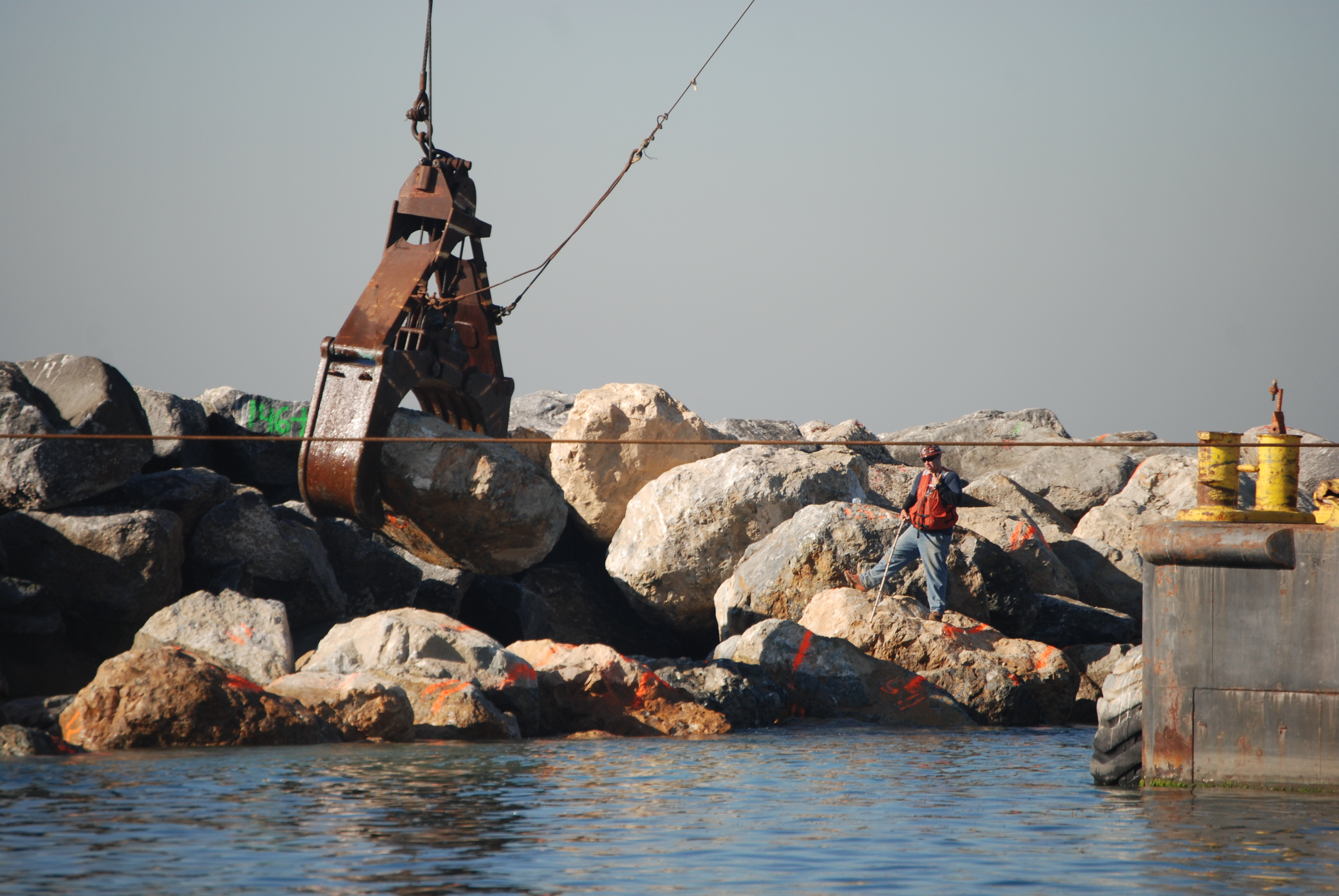
Repair work along the Middle Breakwater on October 29

The Army Corps estimated that it would take more than $20 million to repair just the major breaches along the middle breakwater. On September 18 Connolly-Pacific Co. was contracted for $5m to repair the twelve worst affected areas of the breakwaters and construction began on October 8. An estimated 20,000–30,000 tons of rock would be used in the project. A $200,000 repair budget was initially allocated for areas around Navy Mole, including Pier F, J South, and Navy Mole Road; this was later increased to $4 million by the Long Beach Board of Harbor Commissioners in January 2015.

On Santa Catalina Island, boulders estimated to weigh 3,000 lb (1,400 kg) were tossed inland by the surf. Substantial damage took place at the Avalon Harbor where many dry-docked boats were knocked off their stands. The harbor was littered with debris for several days, mainly pieces of lumber. A pier at White's Landing was also partially destroyed. A 25 ft (7.6 m) boat was tossed onshore at Pebbly Beach into Catalina Laundry, the only laundry business on the island. The building and a nearby boatyard were deemed total losses. Damage at the beach was deemed the worst since September 1997 when Hurricane Linda brought large swells to the region. The Catalina Express ferry halted service on August 27 due to the rough seas. Damage across Catalina Island was estimated to be $3–5 million. Total losses in California amounted to nearly $20 million.

== See also ==
- List of Category 5 Pacific hurricanes
- List of California hurricanes
- Other tropical cyclones named Marie
- Hurricane Linda (1997)
- Hurricane Rick (2009)
- Hurricane Celia (2010)
- Hurricane Jova (2023)
- Hurricane Polo (2026)
