= List of longest rivers of Mexico =

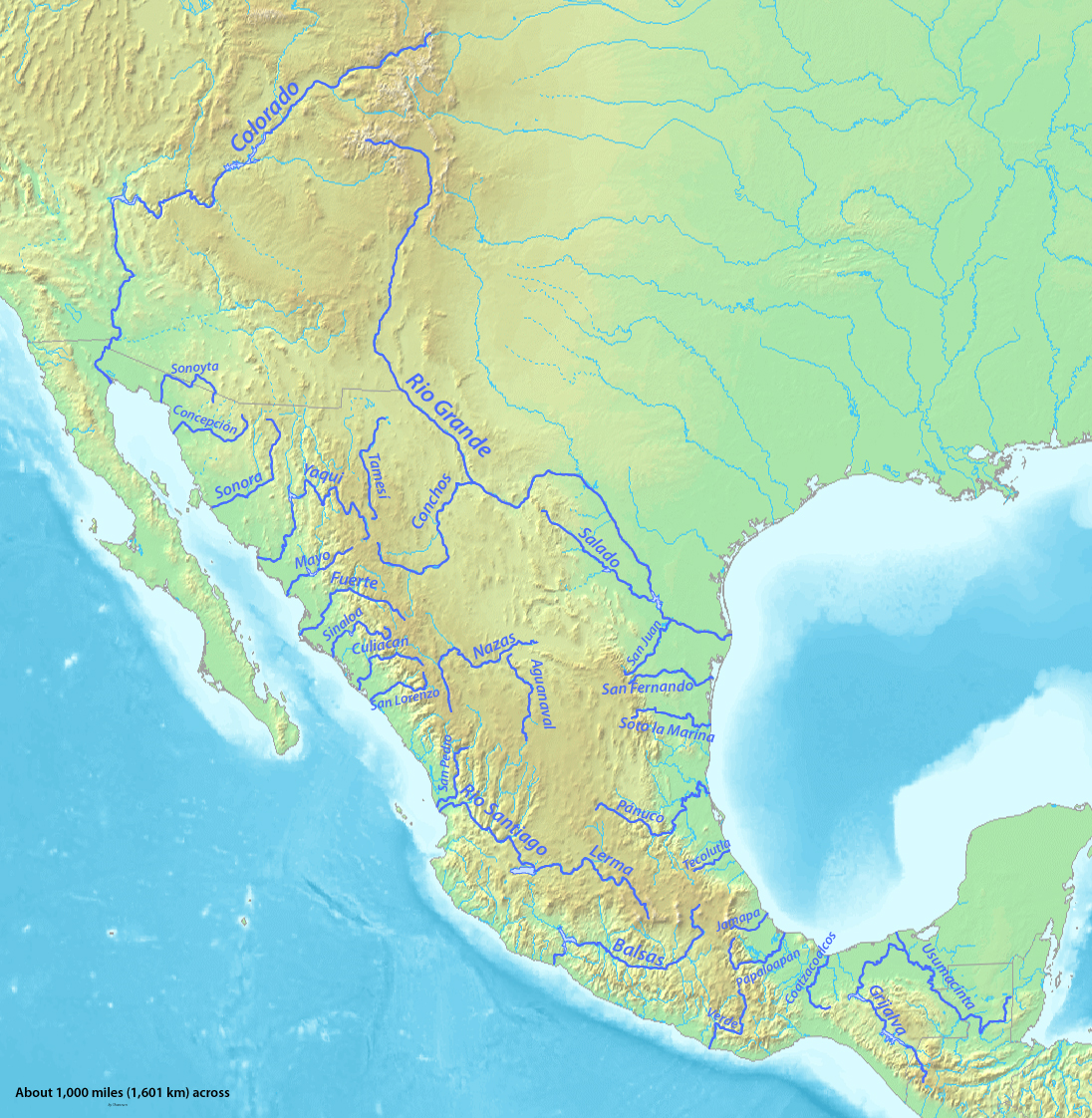
Map showing major rivers in Mexico

Among the longest rivers of Mexico are 26 streams of at least 250 km (160 mi). In the case of rivers such as the Colorado, the length listed in the table below is solely that of the main stem. In the case of the Grijalva and Usumacinta, it is the combined lengths of two river systems that share a delta. In the case of the Nazas and Aguanaval, it is the combined lengths of separate rivers that flow into the same closed basin.

Three rivers in this list cross international boundaries or form them. The Colorado and the Rio Grande (Río Bravo del Norte or Río Bravo) begin in the United States and flow into Mexico, while the Usumacinta begins in Guatemala and flows into Mexico.

The primary source for the length, watershed, and surface runoff data in the table below is the 10th edition of Statistics on Water in Mexico, published by the National Water Commission (CONAGUA); exceptions are as noted. U.S. states and departments of Guatemala appear in italics in the "States" column.

Key
† River is not entirely within Mexico.
‡ Watershed is not entirely within Mexico.

Longest rivers of Mexico
#	Name	Mouth	Length	Watershed area	Annual surface runoff	States	Image
1	Rio Grande (Río Bravo del Norte or Río Bravo)	Gulf of Mexico; 25°57′22″N 97°08′43″W	3,108 km 1,931 mi † (Note: Of the total, 1,074 km (667 mi) or about 35 percent are in the United States, and 2,034 km (1,264 mi) (about 65 percent) form a common border between Mexico and the United States.)	466,939 km^{2} 180,286 mi^{2} ‡ (Note: Of the total, 225,242 km^{2} (86,966 mi^{2}) (about 48 percent) are in Mexico, and 241,697 km^{2} (93,320 mi^{2}) (about 52 percent) are in the United States.)	6,090 × 10^{6} m^{3} 2.15 × 10^{11} ft^{3} (Note: Of the total, 5,588 × 10^{6} m^{3}/year (about 92 percent) come from Mexico and 502 × 10^{6} m^{3}/year (about 8 percent) from the United States.)	Colorado, New Mexico, Texas, Chihuahua, Coahuila, Nuevo León, Tamaulipas	
2	Colorado River	Gulf of California; 31°48′57″N 114°48′22″W	2,337 km 1,452 mi † (Note: Of the total, 2,140 km (1,330 mi) or about 91.5 percent are in the United States; 160 km (99 mi) (about 7 percent) are in Mexico, and 37 km (23 mi) (about 1.5 percent) form a common border between Mexico and the United States.)	630,783 km^{2} 243,547 mi^{2} ‡ (Note: Of the total, 3,840 km^{2} (1,480 mi^{2}) (about 0.6 percent) are in Mexico, and 626,943 km^{2} (242,064 mi^{2}) (about 99.4 percent) are in the United States.)	17,898 × 10^{6} m^{3} 6.321 × 10^{11} ft^{3} (Note: Of the total, 13 × 10^{6} m^{3}/year, about 0.07 percent, come from Mexico and 17,885 × 10^{6} m^{3}/year (about 99.93 percent) from the United States.)	Colorado, Utah, Arizona, Nevada, California, Sonora, Baja California	
3	Grijalva–Usumacinta Rivers	Bay of Campeche; 18°35′20″N 92°41′20″W	1,911 km 1,187 mi † (Note: Of the total, 1,521 km (945 mi) or about 80 percent are in Mexico, and 390 km (240 mi) (about 20 percent) are in Guatemala.)	128,390 km^{2} 49,570 mi^{2} ‡ (Note: Of the total, 83,553 km^{2} (32,260 mi^{2}) (about 65 percent) are in Mexico, and 44,837 km^{2} (17,312 mi^{2}) (about 35 percent) are in Guatemala.)	115,536 × 10^{6} m^{3} 4.0801 × 10^{12} ft^{3} (Note: Of the total, 71,716 × 10^{6} m^{3}/year (about 62 percent) come from Mexico and 43,820 × 10^{6} m^{3}/year (about 38 percent) from Guatemala.)	Petén, Chiapas, Tabasco	Boats line the near shore of a middle-sized river in a forest.
4	Nazas–Aguanaval Rivers	Bolsón de Mapimí; 25°12′00″N 104°12′00″W	1,081 km 672 mi	89,239 km^{2} 34,455 mi^{2}	1,912 × 10^{6} m^{3} 6.75 × 10^{10} ft^{3}	Durango, Zacatecas, Coahuila	
5	Culiacán River	Pacific Ocean; 24°29′32″N 107°43′55″W	875 km 544 mi	15,731 km^{2} 6,074 mi^{2}	3,161 × 10^{6} m^{3} 1.116 × 10^{11} ft^{3}	Sinaloa	A medium-sized river seen from a bridge with a metal railing.
6	Balsas River	Pacific Ocean; 17°56′22″N 102°08′14″W	770 km 478 mi	117,406 km^{2} 45,331 mi^{2}	16,587 × 10^{6} m^{3} 5.858 × 10^{11} ft^{3}	Puebla, Morelos, Michoacán, Guerrero	A wide flat river flows between tree-lined banks. Jagged hills rise in the distance.
7	Lerma River	Lake Chapala; 20°15′00″N 103°00′00″W	708 km 440 mi	47,116 km^{2} 18,192 mi^{2}	4,742 × 10^{6} m^{3} 1.675 × 10^{11} ft^{3}	State of Mexico, Querétaro, Michoacán, Guanajuato, Jalisco	
8	Rio Grande de Santiago	Pacific Ocean; 21°38′00″N 105°26′43″W	562 km 349 mi	76,416 km^{2} 29,504 mi^{2}	7,849 × 10^{6} m^{3} 2.772 × 10^{11} ft^{3}	Jalisco, Nayarit	A muddy river winds along the bottom of a deep canyon.
9	Fuerte River	Gulf of California; 25°48′00″N 109°25′00″W	540 km 336 mi	33,590 km^{2} 12,970 mi^{2}	5,176 × 10^{6} m^{3} 1.828 × 10^{11} ft^{3}	Sinaloa	
10	Pánuco River	Gulf of Mexico; 22°16′00″N 97°47′00″W	510 km 317 mi	84,956 km^{2} 32,802 mi^{2}	20,330 × 10^{6} m^{3} 7.18 × 10^{11} ft^{3}	Veracruz	
11	Rio Conchos	Rio Grande; 25°07′00″N 98°32′00″W	485 km 301 mi	68,386 km^{2} 26,404 mi^{2}	2,714 × 10^{6} m^{3} 9.58 × 10^{10} ft^{3}	Chihuahua	
12	Sonora River	Gulf of California; 28°47′06″N 111°55′11″W	421 km 262 mi	27,740 km^{2} 10,710 mi^{2}	408 × 10^{6} m^{3} 1.44 × 10^{10} ft^{3}	Sonora	
13	Soto La Marina River	Gulf of Mexico; 23°45′56″N 97°44′13″W	416 km 258 mi	21,183 km^{2} 8,179 mi^{2}	2,086 × 10^{6} m^{3} 7.37 × 10^{10} ft^{3}	Tamaulipas	
14	Yaqui River	Gulf of California; 27°39′17″N 110°37′26″W	410 km 255 mi	72,540 km^{2} 28,010 mi^{2}	3,163 × 10^{6} m^{3} 1.117 × 10^{11} ft^{3}	Sonora	Yaqui River – Sonora, Mexico
15	Sinaloa River	Gulf of California; 25°16′51″N 108°29′43″W	400 km 249 mi	12,260 km^{2} 4,730 mi^{2}	2,126 × 10^{6} m^{3} 7.51 × 10^{10} ft^{3}	Sinaloa	
16	San Fernando River	Gulf of Mexico; 24°55′00″N 97°40′00″W	400 km 249 mi	17,744 km^{2} 6,851 mi^{2}	1,545 × 10^{6} m^{3} 5.46 × 10^{10} ft^{3}	Tamaulipas	
17	Mayo River	Gulf of California; 26°45′00″N 109°47′00″W	386 km 240 mi	15,113 km^{2} 5,835 mi^{2}	1,232 × 10^{6} m^{3} 4.35 × 10^{10} ft^{3}	Chihuahua, Sonora	
18	Tecolutla River	Gulf of Mexico; 20°29′00″N 97°00′00″W	375 km 233 mi	7,903 km^{2} 3,051 mi^{2}	6,095 × 10^{6} m^{3} 2.152 × 10^{11} ft^{3}	Veracruz	
19	Jamapa River	Gulf of Mexico; 19°02′00″N 96°08′00″W	368 km 229 mi	4,061 km^{2} 1,568 mi^{2}	2,563 × 10^{6} m^{3} 9.05 × 10^{10} ft^{3}	Veracruz	A small calm river curves between banks covered in dense green foliage.
20	Papaloapan River	Gulf of Mexico; 18°42′00″N 95°38′00″W	354 km 220 mi	46,517 km^{2} 17,960 mi^{2}	44,662 × 10^{6} m^{3} 1.5772 × 10^{12} ft^{3}	Oaxaca, Veracruz	A middle-sized river flows placidly between banks covered in vegetation.
21	Verde River	Pacific Ocean; 16°25′23″N 94°52′56″W	342 km 213 mi	5,937 km^{2} 2,292 mi^{2}	5,937 × 10^{6} m^{3} 2.097 × 10^{11} ft^{3}	Oaxaca	
22	Concepción River	Gulf of California; 30°32′00″N 113°02′00″W	335 km 208 mi	25,808 km^{2} 9,965 ^{2}	123 × 10^{6} m^{3} 4.3 × 10^{9} ft^{3}	Sonora	
23	Coatzacoalcos River	Gulf of Mexico; 18°09′00″N 94°24′00″W	325 km 202 mi	17,369 km^{2} 6,706 mi^{2}	28,093 × 10^{6} m^{3} 9.921 × 10^{11} ft^{3}	Oaxaca, Veracruz	
24	San Lorenzo River	Gulf of California; 28°24′00″N 110°19′00″W	315 km 196 mi	8,919 km^{2} 3,444 mi^{2}	1,680 × 10^{6} m^{3} 5.9 × 10^{10} ft^{3}	Durango, Sinaloa	
25	Sonoyta River	Gulf of California; 31°16′00″N 113°19′00″W	311 km 193 mi	7,653 km^{2} 2,955 mi^{2}	16 × 10^{6} m^{3} 570 × 10^{6} ft^{3}	Sonora	
26	San Pedro River	Pacific Ocean; 21°43′41″N 105°29′30″W	255 km 158 mi	26,480 km^{2} 10,220 mi^{2}	3,417 × 10^{6} m^{3} 1.207 × 10^{11} ft^{3}	Durango, Nayarit	

== See also ==
- List of rivers of Mexico
- List of rivers of the Americas by coastline

== Notes and references ==
Notes

== Works cited ==
- Benke, Arthur C., ed., and Cushing, Colbert E., ed. Rivers of North America. Burlington, Massachusetts: Elsevier Academic Press. ISBN 0-12-088253-1.
