= Altar River =

Coordinates: 30°37′33″N 111°57′36″W

Location
- Country: Mexico

The Altar River is a river located in the northern mountains of Sonora, Mexico.

The Altar is a desert river with seasonal flows. It originates near the international border with the United States and flows southwesterly, joining the Magdalena River to form the Concepción River. The upper reaches of the Altar was dammed in 1943 to form the Cuauhtemoc Reservoir just west of Tubutama. The river claims a watershed of 2,801 km^{2} (1,081 sq mi).

== See also ==
- List of rivers of Mexico
