= Omitlán River =

Location
- Country: Mexico

Physical characteristics
- Mouth: Papagayo River
  - location: Southwest of Tierra Colorada
  - coordinates: 17°07′48″N 99°33′14″W

The Omitlán River is a river of Mexico.

== See also ==
- List of rivers of Mexico
