= Río del Oro =

Río del Oro may refer to:

- Río del Oro (Chile)
- Río del Oro (Colombia)
- Río del Oro (Mexico)
- Río del Oro (Spain)

== See also ==
- Río de Oro (disambiguation)
