= Del Rosario (disambiguation) =

Del Rosario is a surname. It may also refer to:

- Del Rosario River, river in Mexico
- Rosario Islands (Islas del Rosario), an archipelago in Colombia
- Sierra del Rosario, a mountain range in Cuba
- Del Rosario University, university in Bogotá, Colombia
