= San Miguel River (Mexico) =

Location
- Country: Mexico

The San Miguel River (Río San Miguel) is a river in the Mexican state of Sonora. It is a tributary of the Sonora River.

The river's watershed is characterized by traditional floodplain farming practices, which persist in many areas along its banks. These agricultural activities are integral to the local economy and culture, reflecting a long-standing relationship between the inhabitants and the river's resources.

== See also ==
- List of rivers of Mexico
