= Pantepec River =

Upper course of the Tuxpan River in Mexico

Location
- Country: Mexico

The Pantepec River is a river of Mexico that belongs to the Tuxpan River basin, on the Gulf of Mexico slope. The Pantepec River is considered the upper course of the Tuxpan River.

The Pantepec River begins in the mountains of the state of Hidalgo, it crosses the Sierra Norte de Puebla, enters the state of Puebla and goes down to the Gulf Coastal Plain in the state of Veracruz. After converging with the Vinazco River, it becomes known as Tuxpan, and ends up flowing into the Gulf of Mexico at the municipality of Tuxpan, Veracruz.

The river is about 130 kilometers long. It is formed by the springs of the eastern slope of the Sierra Madre Oriental, and along its course towards the Gulf of Mexico it receives the waters of numerous tributaries in the Sierra Norte of Puebla. Due to the great rainfall in this river basin, during the rainy season it usually suffers floods, some of which have caused great social disasters. In October 1999, the Pantepec River swept away several houses in the municipality of Huehuetla, Hidalgo, and 254 people in the state of Puebla. When the Pantepec overflows, the soft soils of the Sierra Norte break away from the mountain slopes, and this endangers its inhabitants, especially between the months of June and October, when the rains are highest in the region.

== See also ==
- List of rivers of Mexico
