= Atoyac River =

Atoyac River may refer to the following rivers of Mexico:

- Atoyac River (Guerrero)
- Atoyac River (Oaxaca)
- Atoyac River, the alternative name for the Balsas River, which flows through the states of Guerrero, Michoacan, Puebla, and others on its way to the Pacific Ocean
