= Malibu Pier =

Pier located in Malibu

Coordinates: 34.0360°N 118.6758°W

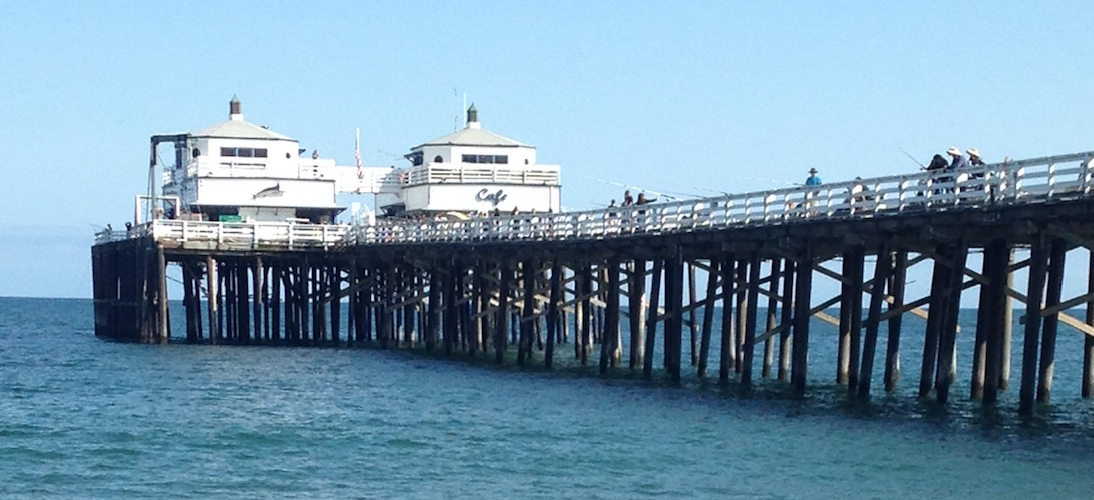
- View of the pier from the east, looking southwest
- Founded: 1905
- Founder: Rhoda May Knight Rindge
- Headquarters: Malibu, California
- Website: malibupier.com

The Malibu Pier is a pier located in Malibu, California. It was constructed in 1905.

== History ==
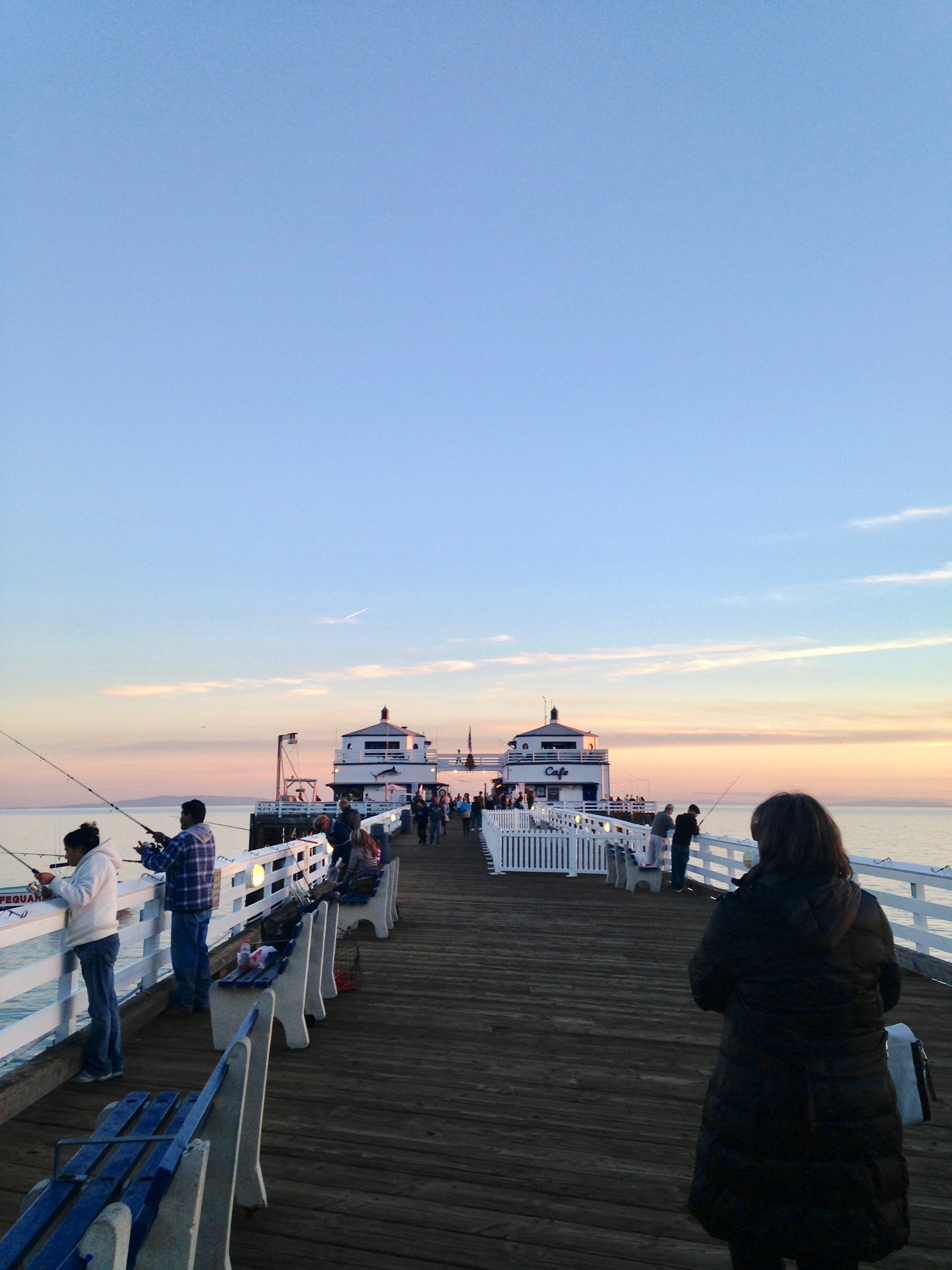
Southward view of the pier and its cafe and souvenir shop

Rhoda May Knight Rindge and Frederick Hastings Rindge conceived of the pier when they caught word that Southern Pacific intended to connect their Santa Barbara terminus with Santa Monica, which would entail running tracks right through the Rindge's 13,315-acre Malibu property. The couple planned to take advantage of an obscure Interstate Commerce Commission law that stated if one railway ran through a property, there could be no other railway doing the same. Hence the Rindges decided to build their own private track—a utilitarian one to service their cattle ranch. Frederick died before the plan could be carried out, but Rhoda May took over, building the Malibu Pier and 15 miles of standard gauge track, known as the Hueneme, Malibu and Port Los Angeles Railway, that ran down the length of the pier, where a steam-powered crane lifted cattle hides and walnuts onto boats for shipment and grains onto land for cattle-feed. The operation kept Southern Pacific Railroad out of Malibu, diverting its course inland.

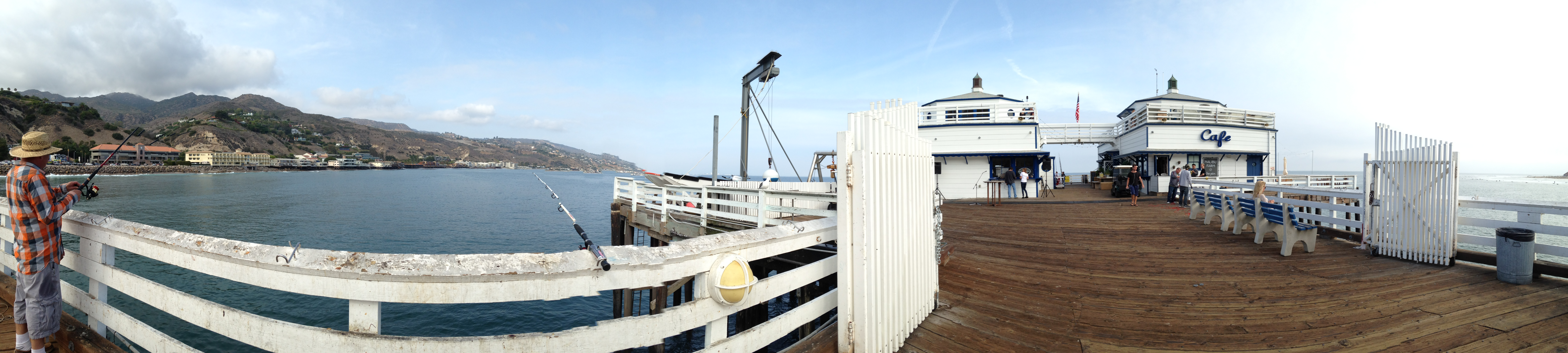
Panoramic view of the pier

In 1934, the pier was opened to the public for pier and charter fishing. During World War II, the end of the pier served as a U.S. Coast Guard daylight lookout station until a storm destroyed the pier's southernmost part; the remains of the pier were subsequently sold to William Huber's Malibu Pier Company for $50,000 with the proviso that he would construct a building for the Coast Guard to re-occupy. At war's end, Huber expanded the pier and built the twin buildings at the end of it for a bait and tackle shop plus a restaurant.

In 1966, the building near the Pacific Coast Highway-side of the pier became the Malibu Sports Club Restaurant, then the Malibu Pier Club after a change in ownership. It was then Alice's from 1972 to the temporary closure of the pier in the 1990s. The pier was eventually restored and reopened in 2008. Though it was partially damaged by Baja's Hurricane Marie, the pier survived and was repaired by 2017.

In January 2025, the winds behind the Palisades Fire damaged the pier, serving as the impetus to close the pier's ocean-end restaurant and souvenir shop temporarily.

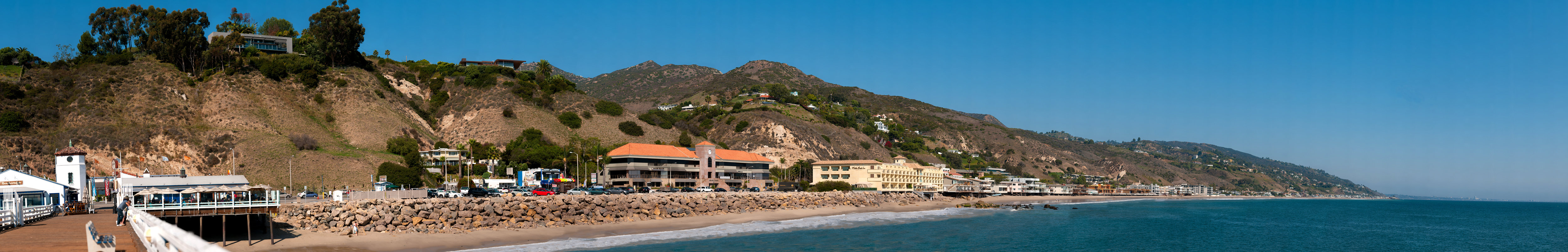
View from the Rindge pier (Malibu Pier). The large building with the orange roof occupies the site of the Rindge railroad car barn.

== Film and television ==
The pier was used in the filming of the 1933 King Kong.

== Gallery ==
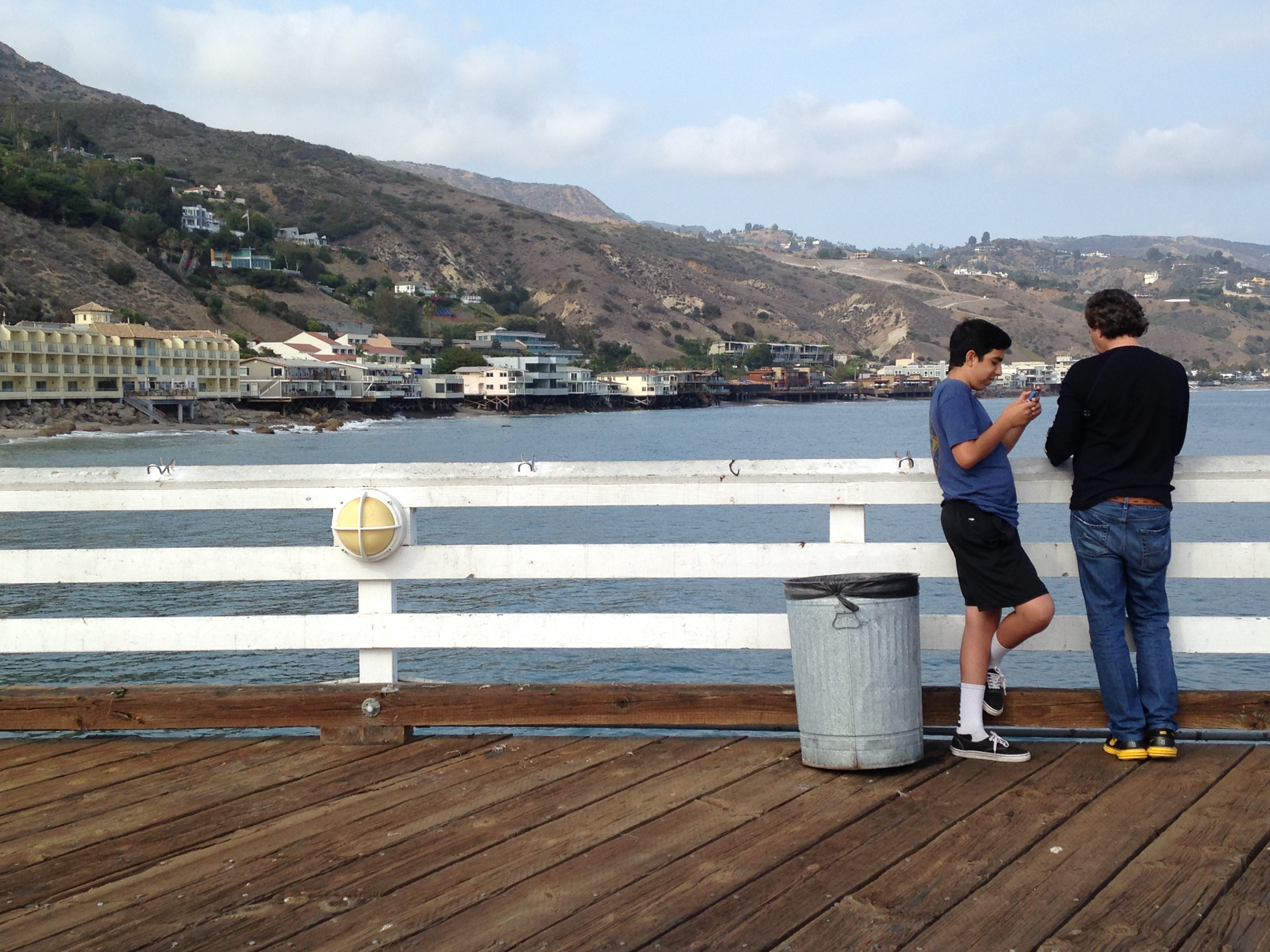
Looking to the Santa Monica Mountains from the pier

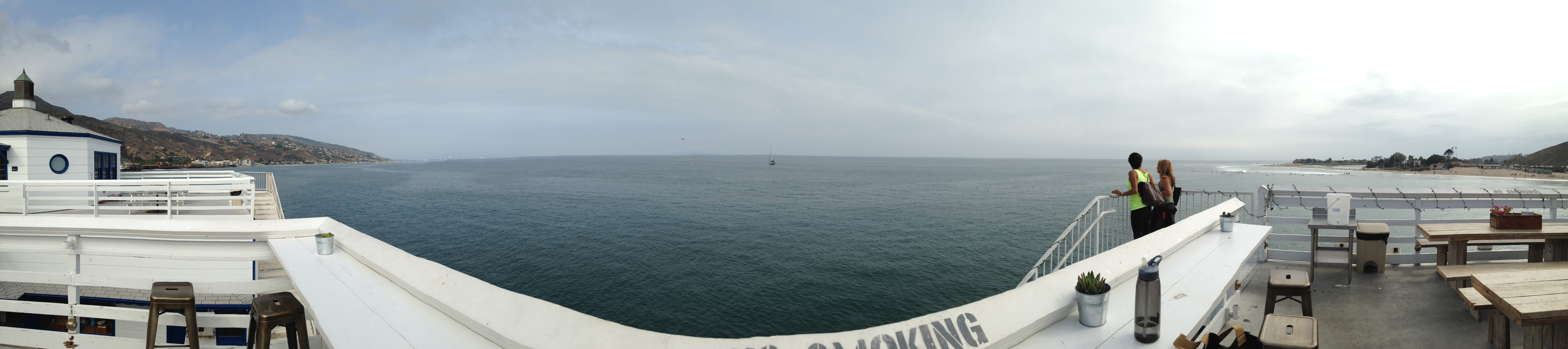
View of the Pacific Ocean from the pier

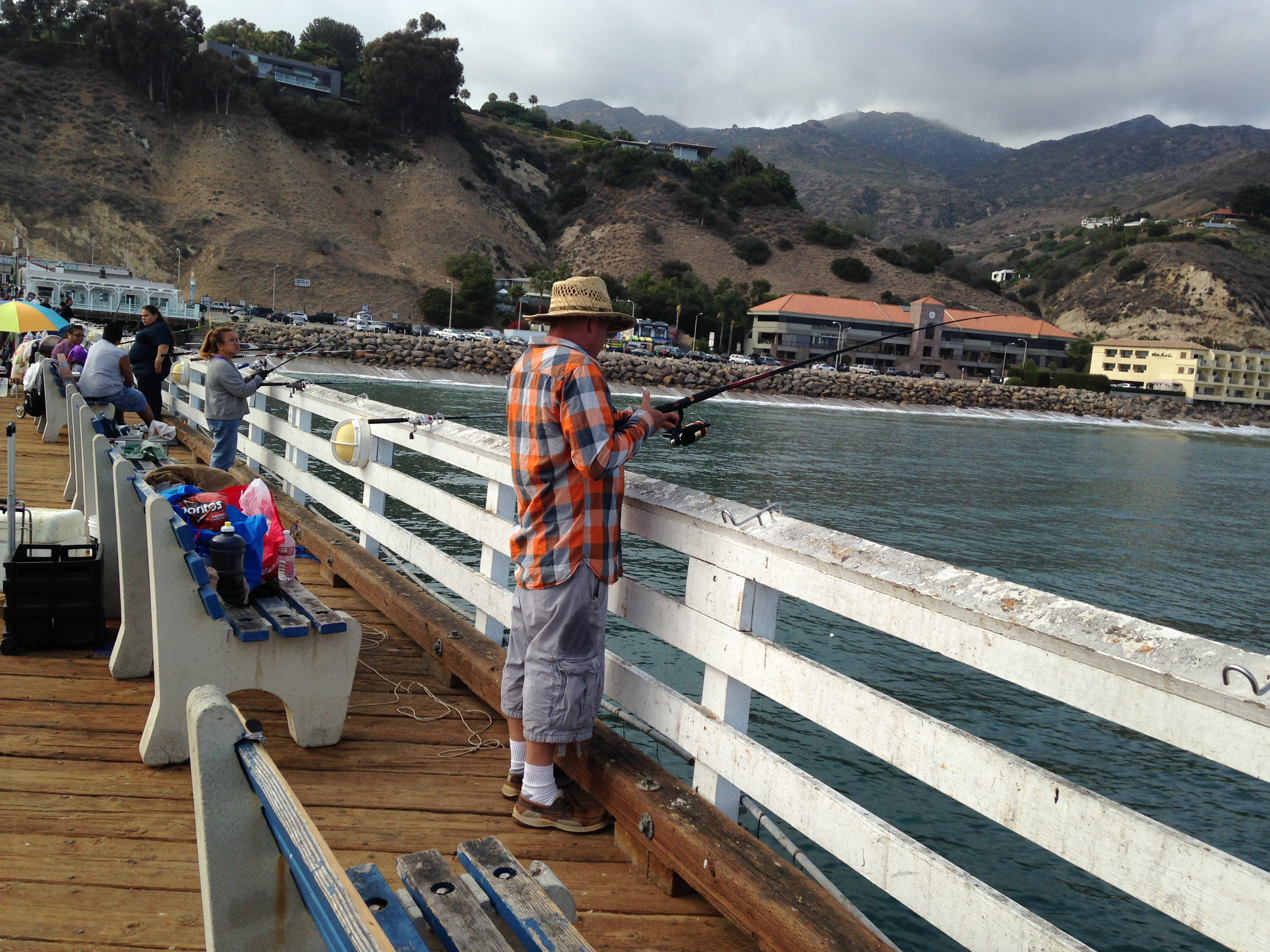
Fishermen along the Malibu Pier

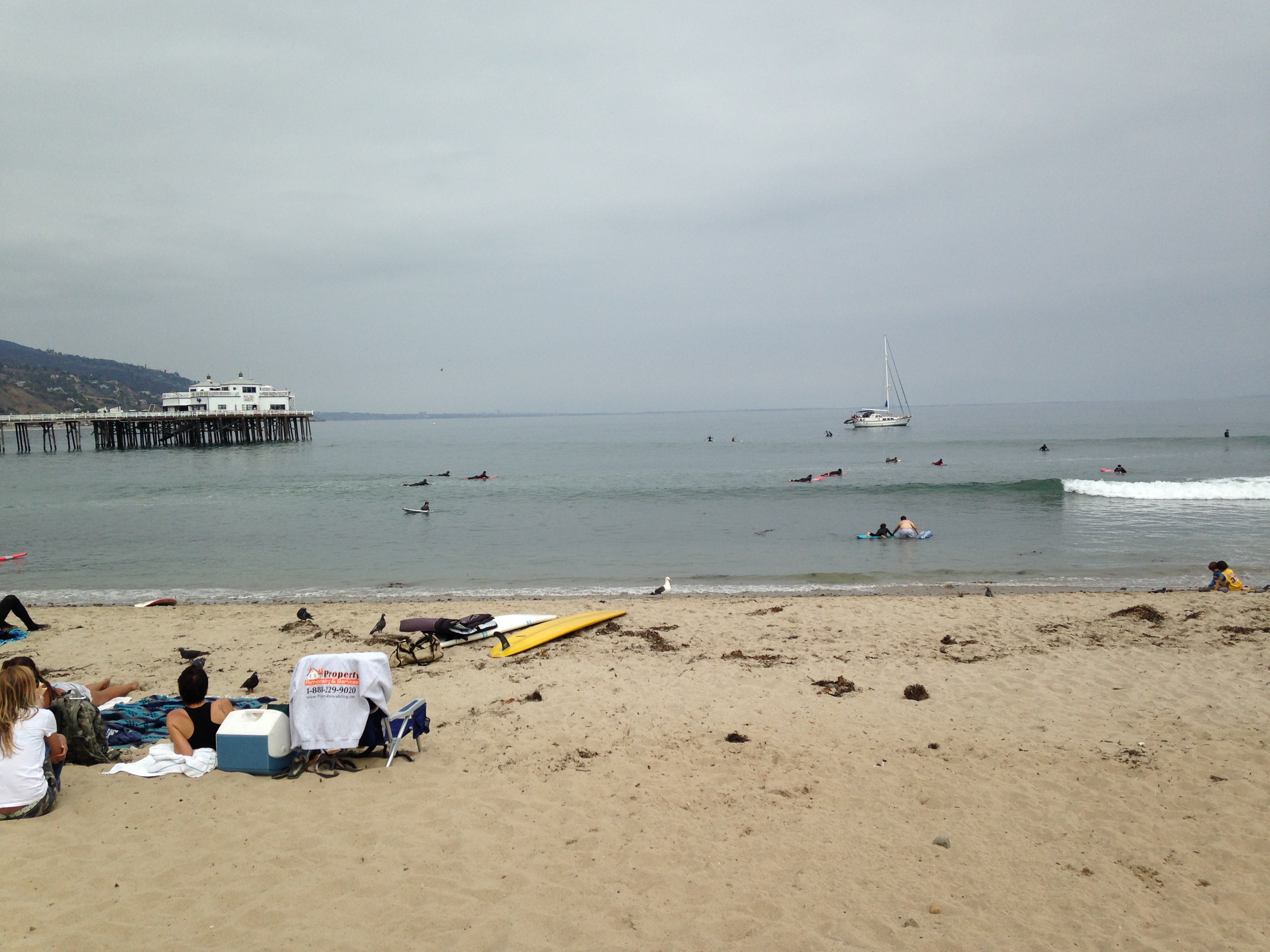
Looking southeast at the pier
