= Tuxpan River (Veracruz) =

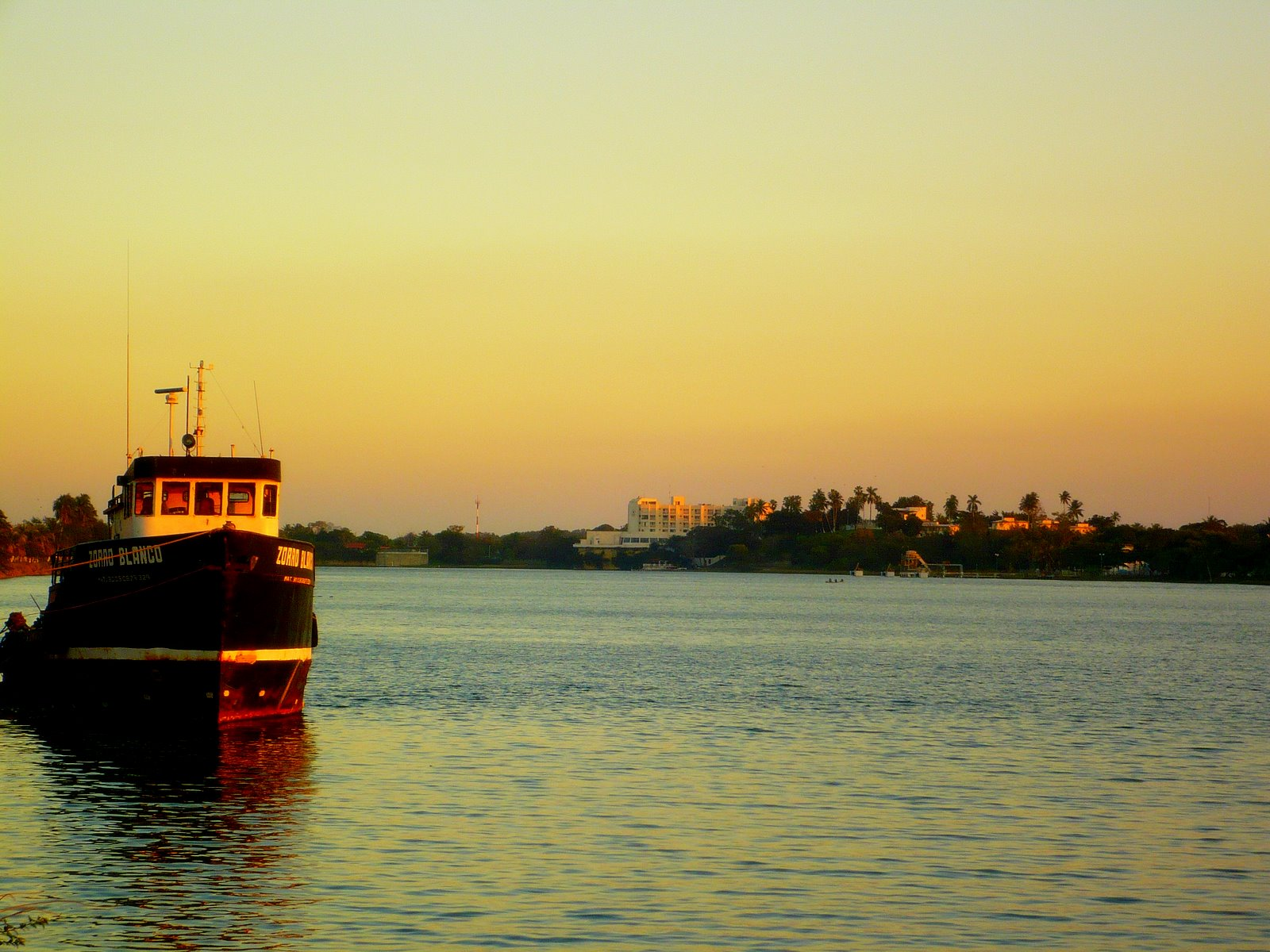

Location
- Country: Mexico

Physical characteristics
- Mouth: Gulf of Mexico
  - location: Near Tuxpan, Veracruz
  - coordinates: 20°58′09″N 97°18′21″W

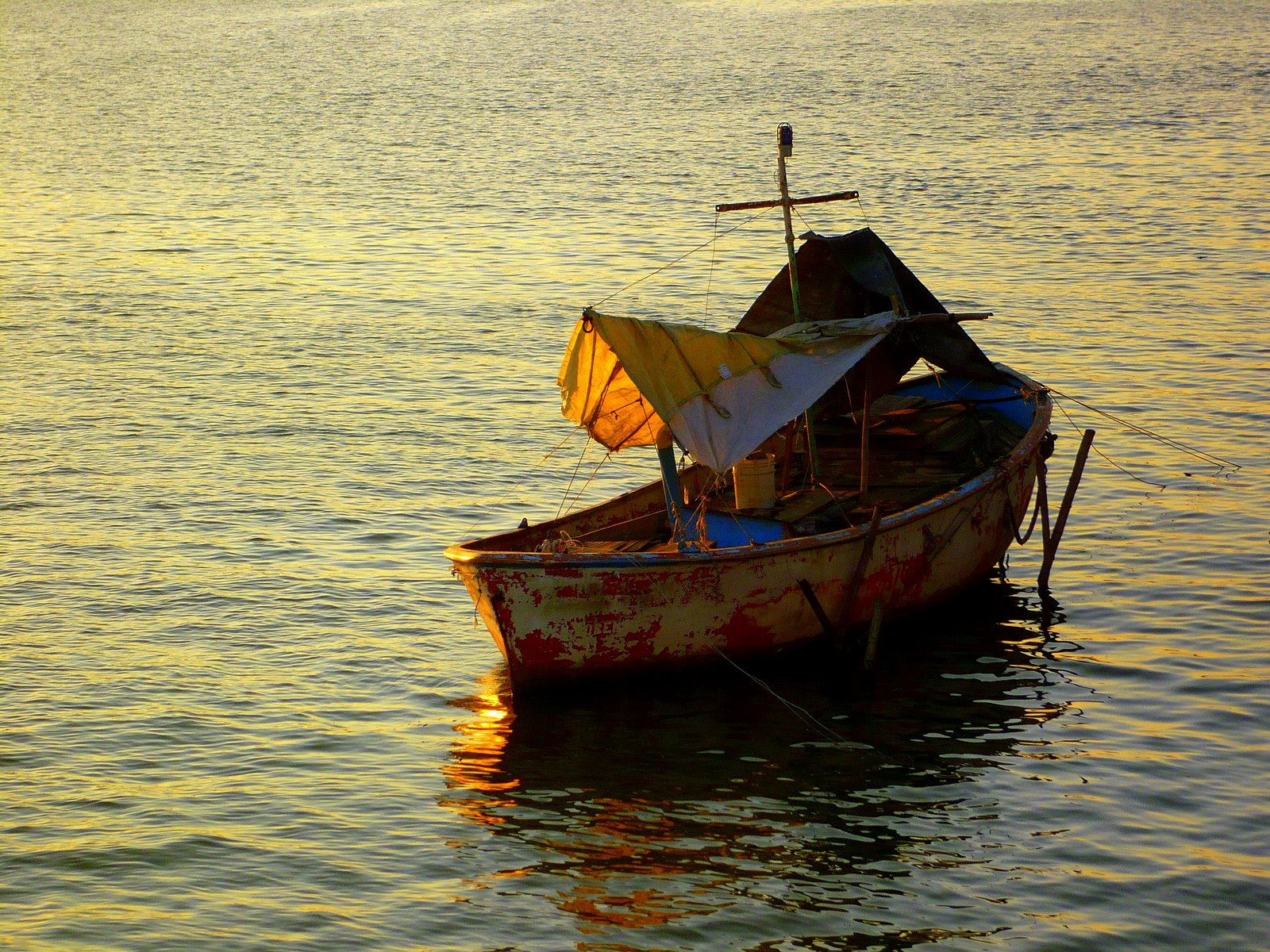
Small boat in the Tuxpan River.

The Tuxpan River in Mexico flows into the Gulf of Mexico near the city and port of Tuxpan (Tuxpan de Rodríguez Cano) in the state of Veracruz. Its principal sources are the Vinazco River, which rises in Hidalgo, and the Pantepec River, which rises in Puebla, both of which enter the territory of Veracruz before the city of Álamo, in Temapache Municipality, uniting to form the Tuxpan, which has become an important passage for harbor access, strengthening the region's economy. Passing the city of Tuxpan it forms the lagoon of Tampamachoco close to its mouth.

== See also ==
- List of rivers of Mexico
