= Bejuco =

Bejuco may refer to:

- Guaco (also called bejuco), a climbing plant
- Bejuco, Panama
- Bejuco District, Costa Rica

== See also ==
- Bejucos River, Mexico
