= Tomatlán =

Tomatlán is a Nahuatl toponym used in Mexico. It may refer to:

- Tomatlán, Jalisco
- Tomatlán, Puebla, in Zacatlán (municipality)
- Tomatlán, Veracruz
- Tomatlán River, in Jalisco
- Boca de Tomatlán, in Jalisco
- Buenavista Tomatlán, in Buenavista, Michoacán
