= Moctezuma River (Sonora) =

Location
- Country: Mexico

The Moctezuma River (Sonora) is a river of Mexico.

== See also ==
- List of rivers of Mexico
