= Laja River (Mexico) =

River in Mexico

The Laja River (Spanish: Río de la Laja or Río Laja) is a river in the central Mexican state of Guanajuato. Measuring 137 km long, it rises in the Sierra Madre Occidental, first flowing east and then south to join the Apaseo near Celaya. The Laja then turns westward to join the Lerma east of Salamanca.

The Laja is impounded at Salitrillo, just downstream from San Miguel de Allende, to form the Presa Allende (Allende Reservoir).
