= Sonoyta River =

River in Mexico

- Location of mouth

Location
- Country: Mexico
- State: Sonora

Physical characteristics
- Mouth
  - location: Gulf of California
  - coordinates: 31°16′07″N 113°19′07″W
- Length: 311 km (193 mi)
- Basin size: 7,653 km^{2} (2,955 mi^{2})
- Discharge
  - average: 0.5 m^{3}/s (18 cu ft/s)

The Sonoyta River is a river of Sonora, Mexico. It is part of the Gulf of Calilfornia watershed.

== See also ==
- List of longest rivers of Mexico
- List of rivers of Mexico
