= Antigua River =

Coordinates: 19°18′32″N 96°16′58″W

Location
- Country: Mexico

The Antigua River is a river of Mexico. It has an area of 108 square miles.

== See also ==
- List of rivers of Mexico
