= Nazas River =

River in Mexico

Coordinates: 25°36′34″N 105°00′40″W

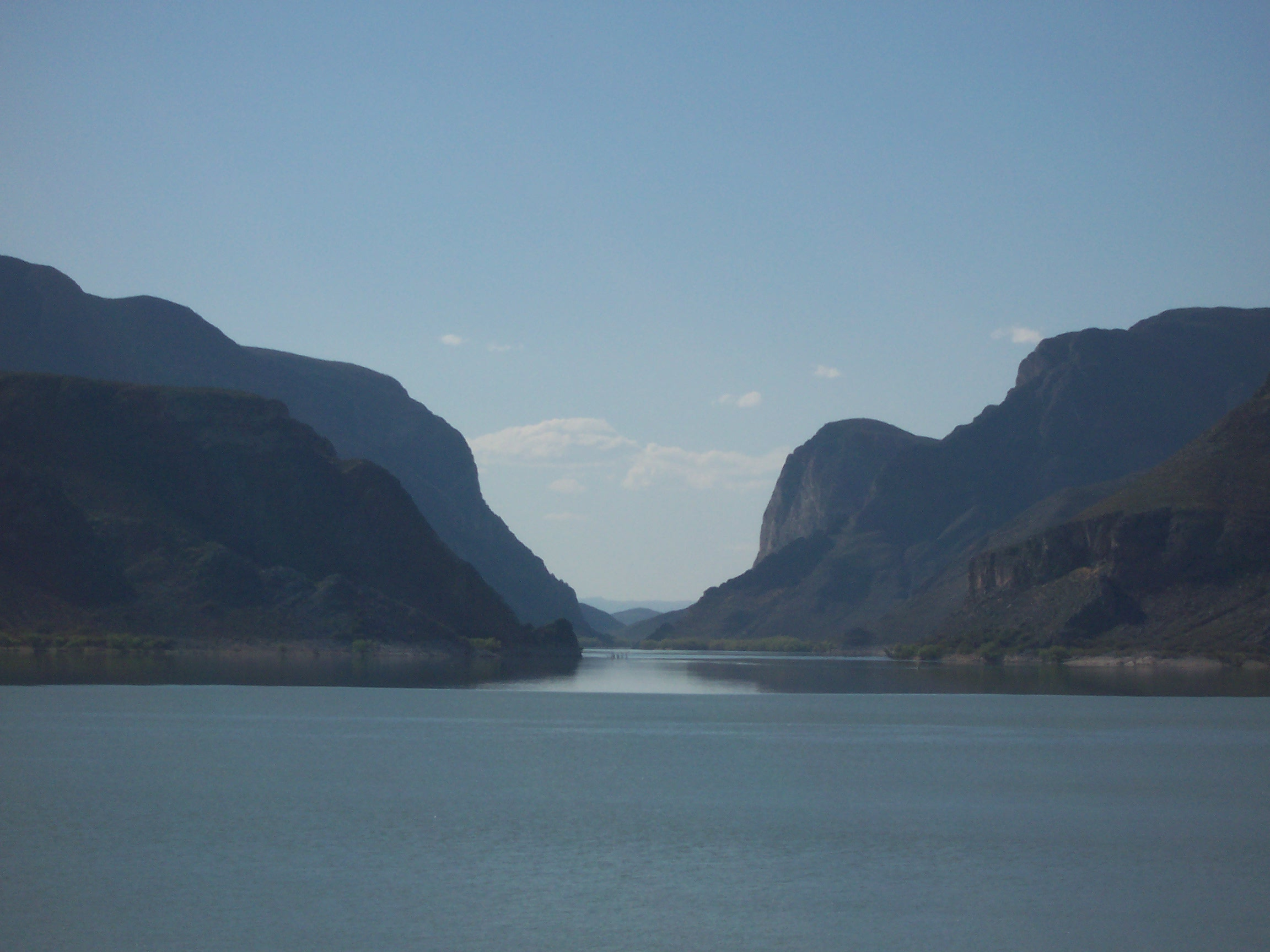

The Nazas River is a river located in northern Mexico, in the states of Coahuila and Durango. It is part of the endorheic Bolsón de Mapimí. It is only 560 kilometres (350 mi) long, but irrigates an area of 71,906 km^{2} (27,763 sq mi) in the middle of the desert. The Nazas is also nurtured by the San Juan, Ramos, Potreritos, del Oro, Nazas, Santiago, Tepehuanes and Peñón Blanco rivers. The river starts at the Sierra Madre Occidental. The aboriginal title for this stream is Tlahualilo, coming from the Nahuatl words tlalli meaning "fertile land" and ahualila, meaning "water for irrigation".

== Etymology ==
The Nazas took its name when the Spaniards, during the conquest of Mexico in the early 1500s, saw the original inhabitants on the shore of the river fishing with fish traps, whose Spanish name is 'nasa', for that reason it became known as the 'river of nazas'.

== Ecology ==
The Nazas watershed contains considerable desertic habitat, outside of the immediate riparian zone. A large variety of flora and fauna populate the Nazas Basin, with a variety of succulent native plants. One of the widespread flora is the ocotillo. A number of freshwater fishes are found in the Nazas River, including Notropis nazas.

== Geography and economy ==
The river acts as a geographic division between the cities of Gómez Palacio in Durango and Torreón in Coahuila. The city of Torreón is named after a tower that was built in the area to monitor the water level of the Nazas from afar.

The Nazas has served as one of the most important natural resources enabling development in the Laguna Region since the middle of the 19th century. All of its waters are locked in Francisco Zarco and Lázaro Cardenas dams, both located in Durango, which have significantly reduced the once mighty flow of the river. However, Coahuila receives an annual share by mutual agreement between the state governments. Indeed, on its course, the Nazas fills smaller water bodies like the Palmito dam (in Torreón) and the Santiaguillo lagoons. The river ends in the now-drained Mayrán Lagoon and the Caimán Lakes in the Tlahualilo region.

The river was an important shooting location for the film The Wild Bunch (1969). In the celebrated scene where a bridge is dynamited, the Nazas stands in for the Rio Grande.

There is an amateur annual kayak competition on the Nazas River between the cities of Rodeo and Lerdo in Durango.

== See also ==
- List of longest rivers of Mexico
