= Sextín River =

Location
- Country: Mexico

The Sextín River is a river of Mexico. It has an elevation of 1,494 meters.

== See also ==
- List of rivers of Mexico
