= Sahuaripa River =

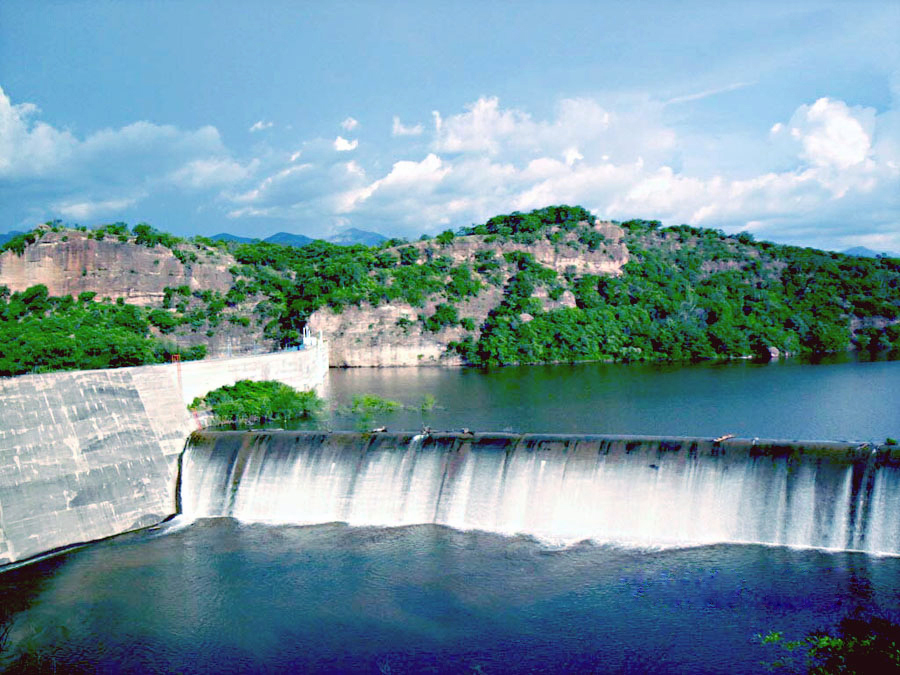

Location
- Country: Mexico

The Sahuaripa River is a river of Mexico.

== See also ==
- List of rivers of Mexico
