= Purificación River (Tamaulipas) =

Location
- Country: Mexico

The Purificación River (Tamaulipas) is a river of Mexico.

== See also ==
- List of rivers of Mexico
