= Mátape River =

River in Mexico

- Location of mouth

Location
- Country: Mexico
- State: Sonora

Physical characteristics
- Mouth
  - coordinates: 28°17′00″N 110°41′00″W

The Mátape River is a river in Sonora, Mexico.

== See also ==
- List of rivers of Mexico
