= Suchiapa River =

Location
- Country: Mexico

The Suchiapa River is a river in the state of Chiapas, Mexico.

Suchiapa en Chiapas

== See also ==
- List of rivers of Mexico
