= Tepalcatepec River =

Location
- Country: Mexico
- States: Jalisco, Michoacán

Physical characteristics
- Mouth
  - location: Balsas River

The Tepalcatepec River is a river of Mexico. It is a tributary of the Balsas River, draining portions of the states of Jalisco and Michoacán.

== See also ==
- List of rivers of Mexico
