= Sinaloa River =

River in Mexico

- Location of mouth

Location
- Country: Mexico
- State: Sinaloa

Physical characteristics
- Mouth
  - coordinates: 25.2833°N 108.4942°W

The Sinaloa River is a river of Mexico. It runs across the state of Sinaloa from northeast to southwest, beginning in the Sierra Madre Occidental and emptying into the Gulf of California. Its flow is interrupted mostly by the Bacurato Dam, which created Lake Baccarac in 1978. Below the dam, the flow of the river is largely diverted by an irrigation canal near the town of Sinaloa de Leyva.

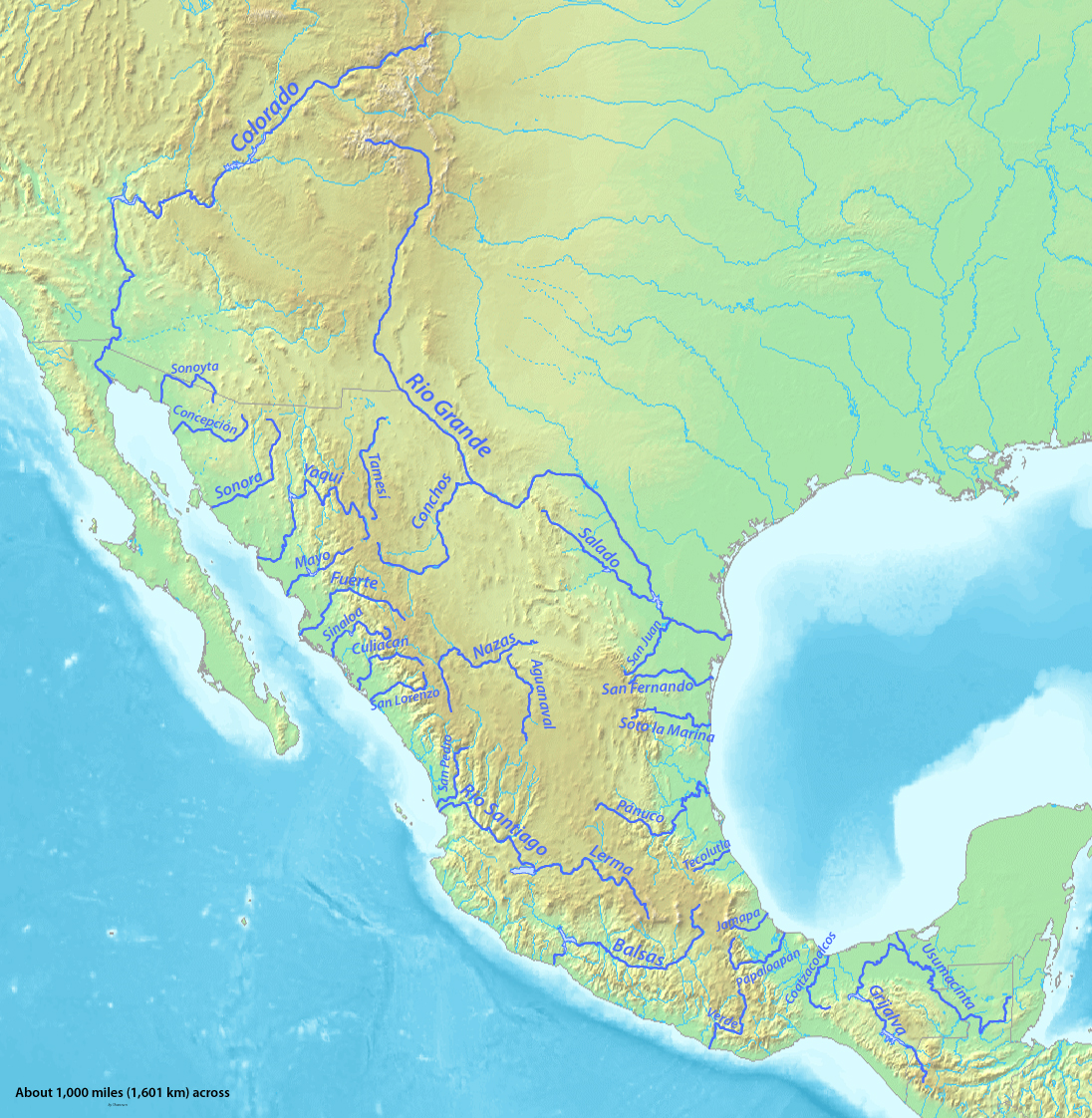
Overview map of major Mexican rivers, including the Sinaloa

== See also ==
- List of longest rivers of Mexico
- List of rivers of Mexico
