= San Lorenzo River (Mexico) =

River in Mexico

- Location of mouth

Location
- Country: Mexico
- State: Sonora

Physical characteristics
- Mouth
  - coordinates: 28°24′52″N 110°14′13″W

The San Lorenzo River (Mexico) is a river of Mexico.

== See also ==
- List of rivers of Mexico
- List of longest rivers of Mexico
