= Animas River (Mexico) =

Location
- Country: Mexico

The Animas River is a river of Mexico.

== See also ==
- List of rivers of Mexico
