= Purificación River (Jalisco) =

River in Mexico

- Location of mouth

Location
- Country: Mexico
- State: Jalisco

Physical characteristics
- Mouth
  - location: Pacific Ocean
  - coordinates: 19°18′07″N 104°53′52″W

The Purificación River (Jalisco) is a river of Mexico.

== See also ==
- List of rivers of Mexico
