= Copalita River =

River in Mexico

- Location of mouth

Location
- Country: Mexico
- State: Oaxaca

Physical characteristics
- Mouth
  - coordinates: 15°47′12″N 96°03′00″W

The Copalita River is a river of Oaxaca, Mexico.

== See also ==
- List of rivers of Mexico
