= Choix River =

- Native name: Río Choix (Spanish)

Location
- Country: Mexico

Physical characteristics
- Mouth
  - location: Choix Municipality, Sinaloa
  - coordinates: 26°42′36.14″N 108°19′9.70″W

The Choix River (Spanish: Río Choix) is a river located in the municipality of Choix in the state of Sinaloa, in northwestern Mexico. It is part of the Fuerte River watershed.
