= Salinas River (Mexico) =

Location
- Country: Mexico

The Salinas River (Mexico) is a river in Mexico.

== See also ==
- List of rivers of Mexico
