= Los Lagos River =

Location
- Country: Mexico

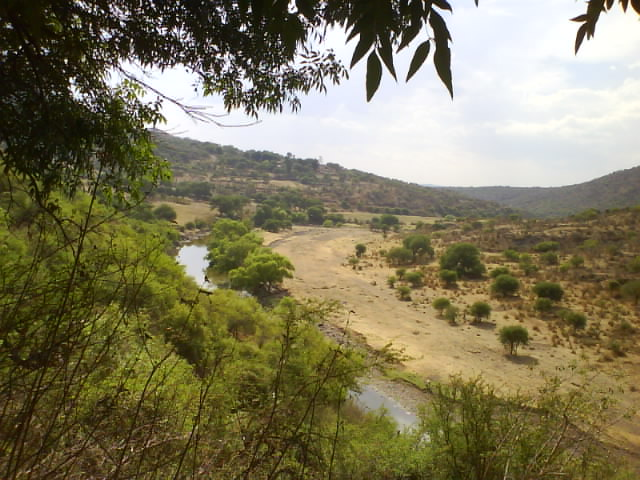

The Los Lagos River is a river of Mexico.

== See also ==
- List of rivers of Mexico
