= Santo Domingo River (Chiapas) =

Location
- Country: Mexico

The Santo Domingo River (Chiapas) is a river of Mexico.

== See also ==
- List of rivers of Mexico
