= Aguililla River =

Location
- Country: Mexico

The Aguililla River is a river of Mexico.

== See also ==
- List of rivers of Mexico
