= San Andres River =

River in Mexico

- Location of mouth

Location
- Country: Mexico
- State: Durango

Physical characteristics
- Mouth
  - coordinates: 24°53′42″N 106°16′21″W

The San Andres River is a river of Mexico.

== See also ==
- List of rivers of Mexico
