= Atenguillo River =

Coordinates: 20°55′24″N 104°37′10″W

Location
- Country: Mexico

Physical characteristics
- Mouth
  - location: Ameca River

The Atenguillo River is a river of Jalisco, Mexico. It is a northward-flowing tributary of the Ameca River

== See also ==
- List of rivers of Mexico
