= San Vicente River =

River in Mexico

- Location of mouth

Location
- Country: Mexico
- State: Baja California

Physical characteristics
- Mouth
  - coordinates: 31°15′46″N 116°22′41″W

The San Vicente River is a river in Baja California, Mexico.

== See also ==
- List of rivers of Mexico
