= San Fernando River =

Location
- Country: Mexico

The San Fernando River is a river of Mexico.

== See also ==
- List of longest rivers of Mexico
- List of rivers of Mexico
