= Fuerte River =

River in the state of Sinaloa, Mexico

Fuerte River Río El Fuerte
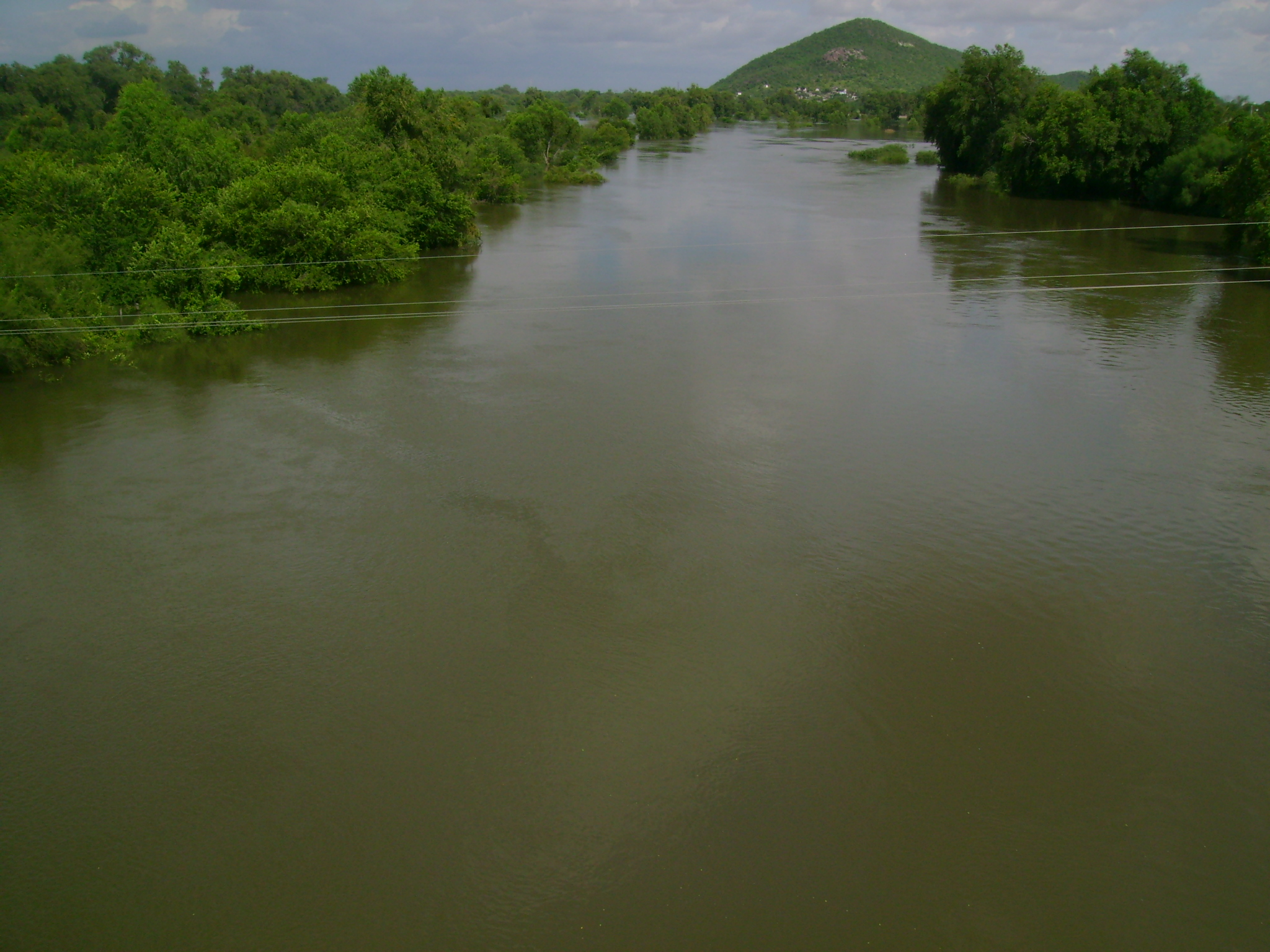
- The Fuerte River

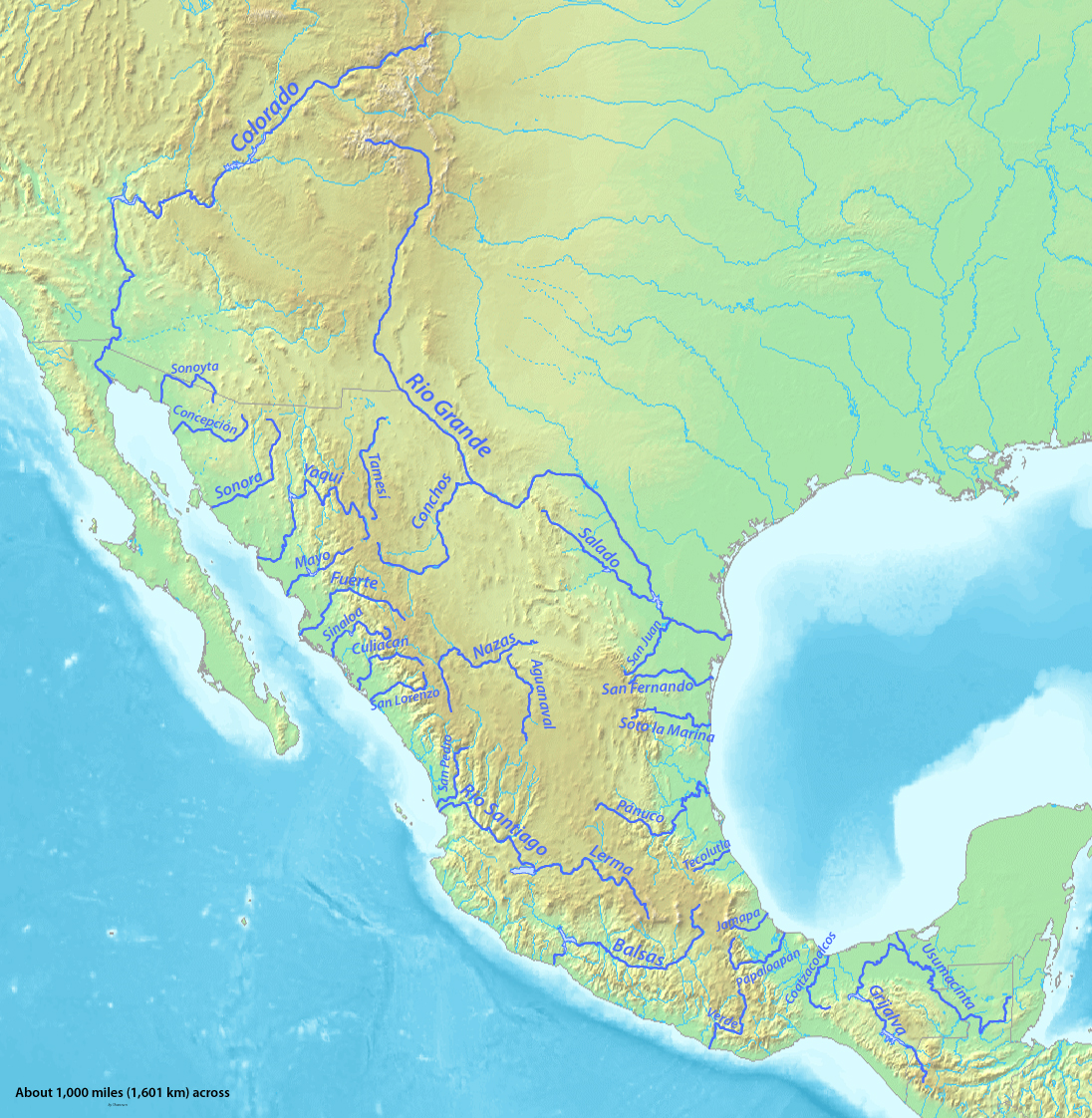
- Major rivers of Mexico, with Fuerte in the northwest of the country

- Location of mouth
- Etymology: Spanish

Location
- Country: Mexico
- State: Chihuahua; Sinaloa; Sonora
- Municipality: Ahome; Choix; El Fuerte

Physical characteristics
- Mouth
  - coordinates: 25°48′N 109°25′W
- Length: 290 km (180 mi)

Basin features
- Inland ports: Topolobampo

The Fuerte River is a river in the state of Sinaloa, in northwestern Mexico. It flows from headwaters in the Sierra Madre Occidental to the Pacific Ocean in the Gulf of California.

== Course ==
It begins at the junction of the Rio Verde (also called the Rio San Miguel) and Urique River, in the Sierra Madre Occidental mountain range. It flows generally southwest for a distance of 290 kilometres (180 mi), with its river mouth on the Gulf of California at Lechuguilla Island, 43 kilometres (27 mi) west of the city of Los Mochis.

Miguel Hidalgo Dam impounds the river near the town of El Fuerte creating the state's largest reservoir, Embalse de Gustavo Diaz Ordaz. The water is used extensively for agricultural irrigation in northern Sinaloa and southern Sonora states.

== Features ==
The river is surrounded by large mango plantations which produce the fruits mainly for export to the United States. The former capitol of Sinaloa, Sinaloa de Leyva, is on the river in the Fuerte River Valley, in the Sierra Madre Occidental foothills.

== See also ==
- Copper Canyon — the world's largest canyon system, formed by the six rivers that are the headwaters of the Fuerte River.
- List of longest rivers of Mexico
