= Teapa River =

Location
- Country: Mexico

Physical characteristics
- Mouth
  - coordinates: 17°49′23″N 92°52′42″W

The Teapa River is a river of Mexico.

== See also ==
- List of rivers of Mexico
