= Arroyo Salado Creek =

Location
- Country: Mexico

The Arroyo Salado is a creek of Mexico.

== See also ==
- List of rivers of Mexico
