= Tesechoacan River =

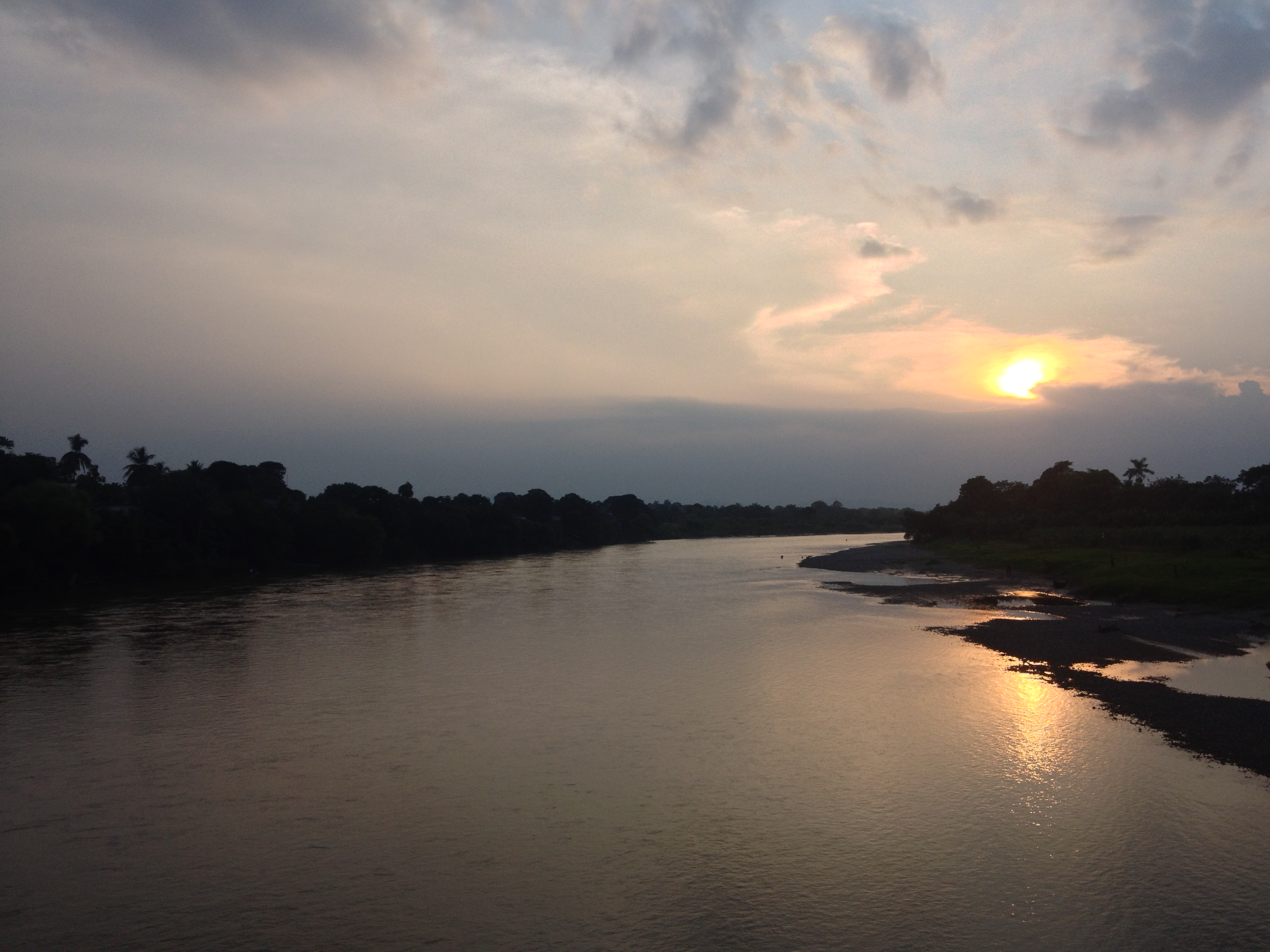

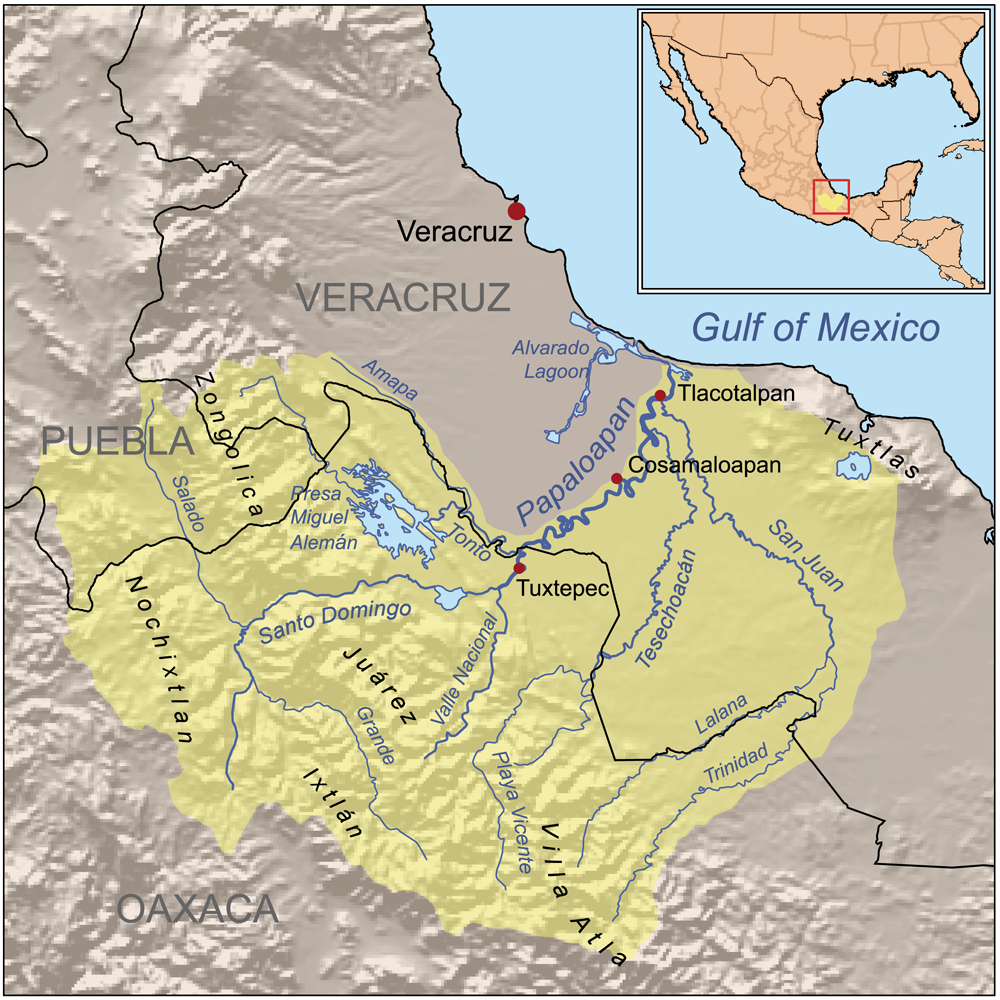
- Map of the Papaloapan River basin. Tesechoacan River in the eastern sector.

Location
- Country: Mexico
- State: Veracruz

Physical characteristics
- Source
  - location: Sierra Juárez
- Mouth
  - location: Papaloapan River

The Tesechoacan River is a river of Mexico in Veracruz state. It is formed where the Cajones River joins the Manso River, both flowing eastward from the Sierra Madre de Oaxaca and is a tributary of the Papaloapan River.

== See also ==
- List of rivers of Mexico
