= Colotepec River =

River in Mexico

- Location of mouth

Location
- Country: Mexico
- State: Oaxaca

Physical characteristics
- Mouth
  - coordinates: 15°48′34″N 97°01′27″W
  - elevation: Sea level

The Colotepec River is a river of Mexico.

== See also ==
- List of rivers of Mexico
