= Mezquitic River =

Location
- Country: Mexico

Physical characteristics
- Mouth
  - location: Bolaños River

The Mezquitic River is a river in Mexico. It is a tributary of the Bolaños River

== See also ==
- List of rivers of Mexico
