= Papigochic River =

Location
- Country: Mexico

The Papigochic River (A.K.A. Papigochi River) is a river of Mexico.

== See also ==
- List of rivers of Mexico
