= Tlapaneco River =

Coordinates: 17°12′00″N 99°05′00″W

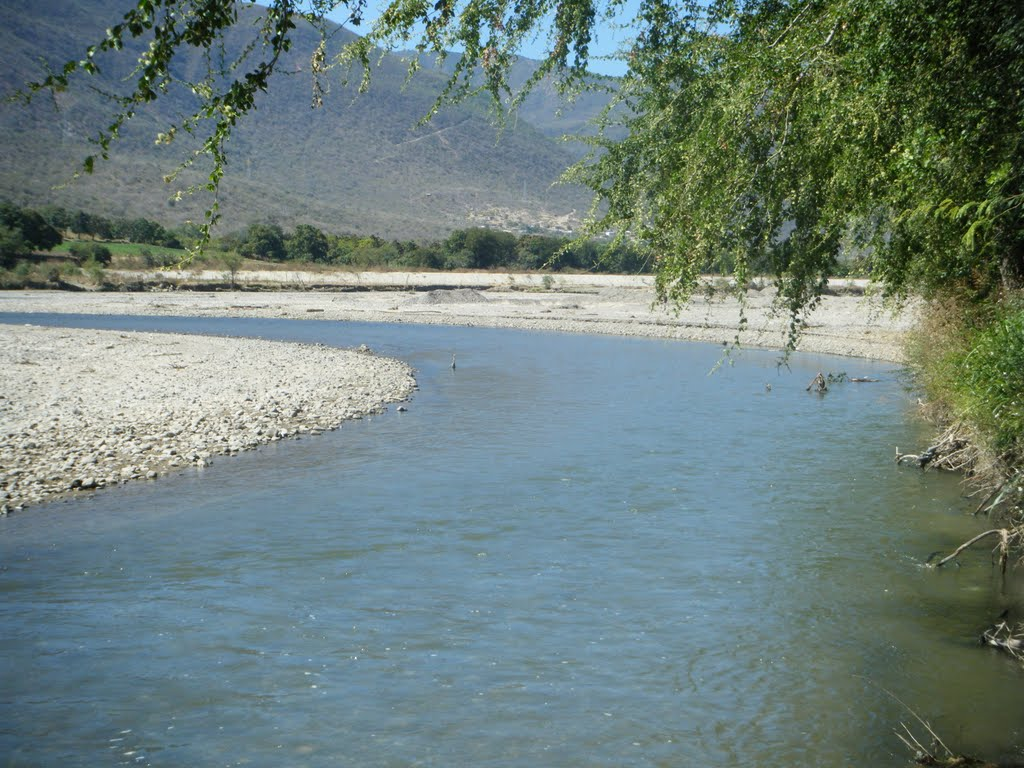
- The Tlapaneco River in Guerrero, Mexico

- Location of the Tlapaneco River mouth in Guerrero

Location
- Country: Mexico
- State: Guerrero

Physical characteristics
- Source
  - location: Highlands near Tlapa de Comonfort, Guerrero
  - elevation: 1600 m (5250 ft)
- Mouth
  - location: Confluence with the Balsas River near Atlixtac, Guerrero
  - elevation: 600 m (1970 ft)

The Tlapaneco River is a river located in southern Mexico. exactly in the state of Guerrero. This river system belongs to the Balsas River Basin which is an important Mexican river network and functions as a Balsas River tributary that finally reaches the Pacific Ocean.

== Geography ==
The Tlapaneco River flows through the rockyland of Guerrero, a region having many mountains landscapes and valleys. It is part of the larger Balsas River Basin, which is one of the most important river systems in Mexico. It is a tributary of the Balsas River, which into the Pacific Ocean. The river originates from the highlands(High areas) near Tlapa de Comonfort City in the Mexican state of Guerrero.

== See also ==
- List of rivers of Mexico
- Balsas River
- Tlapa de Comonfort
- Guerrero
- Sierra Madre del Sur
