= Río de Oro (disambiguation) =

Río de Oro is one of the two territories that formed the Spanish province of Spanish Sahara after 1969.

Río de Oro may also refer to:

- Río de Oro, Cesar, a town in Colombia
- Río de Oro (Melilla), a river in Morocco
- Río de Oro (Argentina), a river in Argentina
- Río de Oro (Catatumbo), a river in Colombia and Venezuela

== See also ==
- Río del Oro (disambiguation)
