= Santa Maria River (Chihuahua) =

River in Mexico

Location
- Country: Mexico

The Santa Maria River (Chihuahua) is a river in the state Chihuahua of Mexico. It drains from the Sierra Madre Occidental but is an endorheic basin, i.e. it does not flow into a river, sea or ocean. It is popular for rafting.

== See also ==
- List of rivers of Mexico
