= San Nicolás River =

- Location of mouth

Location
- Country: Mexico
- State: San Luis Potosí

Physical characteristics
- Mouth
  - coordinates: 22°05′32″N 99°17′45″W

The San Nicolás River is a river of Mexico.

== See also ==
- List of rivers of Mexico
