= Río Verde (Chihuahua) =

Coordinates: 16°29′N 94°54′W

Location
- Country: Mexico

The Río Verde (Chihuahua) is a river of Mexico.

== See also ==
- List of rivers of Mexico
