= Río del Oro (Mexico) =

Location
- Country: Mexico
- State: Guerrero

The Río del Oro is a river of southern Mexico. It is a tributary of the Balsas River, originating in the Sierra Madre del Sur of Guerrero state and flowing northwards to join the Balsas.

== See also ==
- List of rivers of Mexico
