= Sonora River =

Rio Sonora Sonora River
- Location of mouth

Location
- Country: Mexico
- State: Sonora

Physical characteristics
- Mouth
  - location: Gulf of California
  - coordinates: 28°51′12″N 111°59′27″W
- Length: 402 km (250 mi)
- Basin size: 10,040 km^{2} (3,880 sq mi)

Río Sonora (Sonora River) is a 402-kilometer-long river of Mexico. It lies on the Pacific slope of the Mexican state of Sonora and it runs into the Gulf of California.

== Watershed ==
The Sonora River watershed covers 10,040 square miles (26,000 km^{2}) of public land. Slopes range from steep orientations in the upper part of the watershed to more gradual topographies in the valleys. The Sonora River watershed is subdivided into six smaller watersheds.

== Ecology ==
Biotic communities found within the watershed in order of importance by the area covered are the Sinaloan thornscrub, the plains of Sonora subdivision, semidesert grasslands, the Madrean evergreen woodland, and the central gulf coast subdivision. Average annual precipitation is 375 millimetres (14.8 in) which occurs in two seasons, late summer-early fall and winter-early spring.

Physician naturalist Edgar Alexander Mearns' 1907 report of beaver (Castor canadensis) on the Sonora River may be the southernmost extent of the range of this North American aquatic mammal.

== See also ==
- List of longest rivers of Mexico
