= Mascota River =

River in Mexico

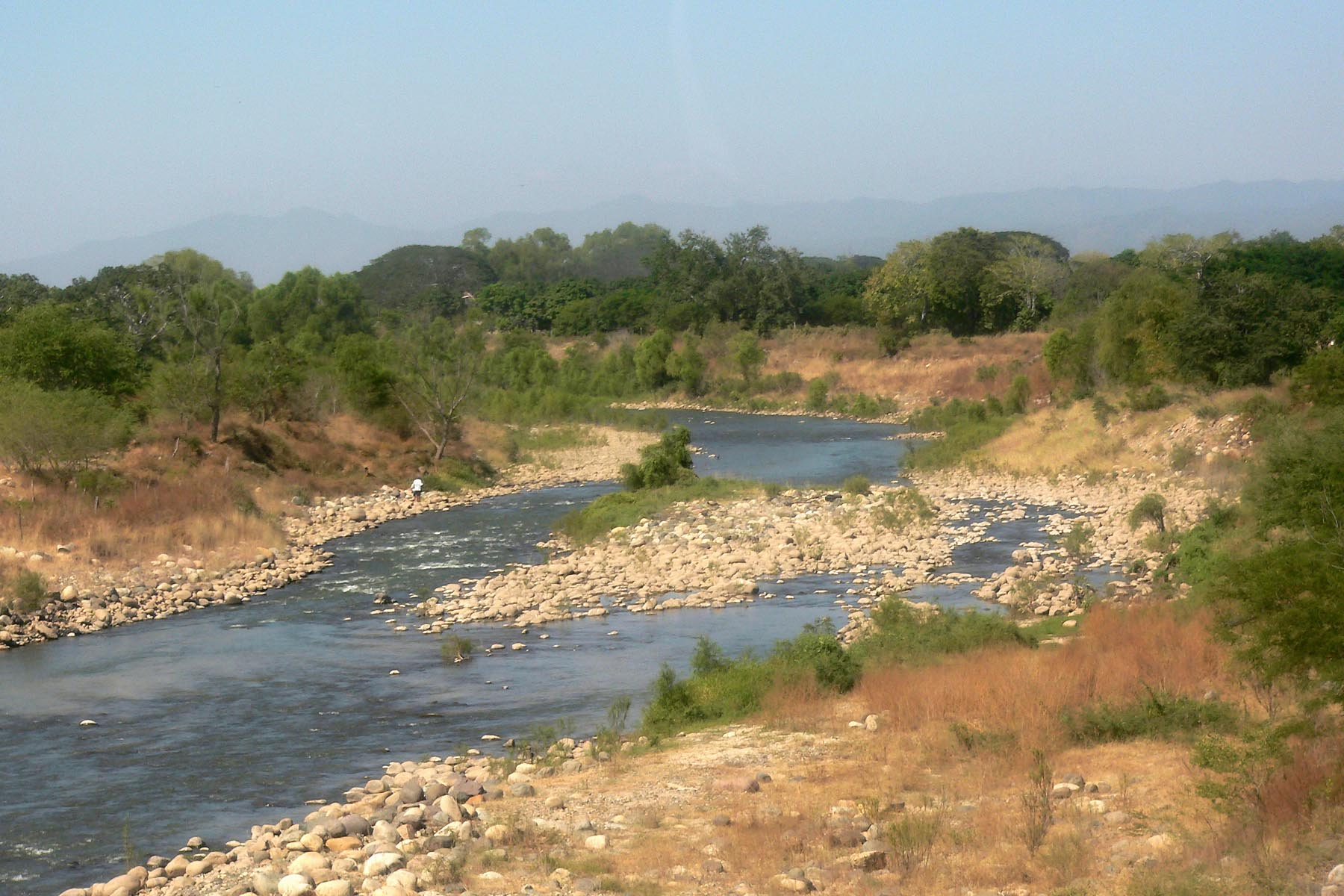

The Mascota River is a river running through Jalisco state in western Mexico. Mascota, a small colonial town, lies on the shore of the river. The river is a tributary of Ameca river.

== See also ==
Mascota
