= Tepehuanes River =

Location
- Country: Mexico

The Tepehuanes River is a river located in Durango, Mexico.

== See also ==
- List of rivers of Mexico
