= Atoyac River (Guerrero) =

River in Mexico

- Location of mouth

Location
- Country: Mexico

Physical characteristics
- Mouth
  - coordinates: 17°56′24″N 102°08′13″W

The Atoyac River is a river of Mexico located in the state of Guerrero.

In 1992's Hurricane Virgil, a flood on the Atoyac River washed away 500 homes in Guerrero, which prompted the evacuation of 2,500 people.

== See also ==
- List of rivers of Mexico
