= Apaseo River =

Coordinates: 20°32′50″N 100°42′57″W

Location
- Country: Mexico

The Apaseo River is a river of Mexico, a tributary of the Lerma River.

== See also ==
- List of rivers of Mexico
