= List of storms named Marie =

The name Marie has been used for fifteen tropical cyclones. Six in the East Pacific Ocean and nine in the West Pacific Ocean.

In the East Pacific:

- Hurricane Marie (1984) – a Category 1 hurricane that caused a fatality due to increased surf in California.
- Hurricane Marie (1990) – a Category 4 hurricane that did not affect land.
- Hurricane Marie (2008) – a Category 1 hurricane that did not affect land.
- Hurricane Marie (2014) – a Category 5 hurricane that caused hundreds of ocean rescues in California and became the seventh-strongest Pacific hurricane on record.
- Hurricane Marie (2020) – a Category 4 hurricane that did not affect land.
- Hurricane Marie (2026) – a Category 2 hurricane that caused rough seas off the coast of California.

In the West Pacific:

- Typhoon Marie (1954) (T5415) – a Category 1-equivalent typhoon that killed over 1,000 people. Also sank the Tōya Maru, hence becoming known as the Tōya Maru Typhoon (ja:洞爺丸台風) in Japan.
- Typhoon Marie (1958) (T5827) – a Category 4-equivalent typhoon.
- Tropical Storm Marie (1961) (T6117, 49W) – made landfall on Shikoku as a tropical depression.
- Typhoon Marie (1964) (T6416, 20W, Undang) – a Category 1-equivalent typhoon.
- Typhoon Marie (1966) (T6631, 33W) – a Category 3-equivalent typhoon.
- Tropical Storm Marie (1969) (T6919, 23W)
- Typhoon Marie (1972) (T7224, 26W) – a Category 4-equivalent typhoon.
- Typhoon Marie (1976) (T7603, 03W, Konsing) – a Category 4-equivalent typhoon.
- Typhoon Marie (1997) (T9705, 06W) – a Category 2-equivalent typhoon.

== See also ==
- Cyclone Madi (2013) – a North Indian Ocean tropical cyclone with a similar name.
