= Jamapa River =

Coordinates: 19.101278°N 96.100806°W

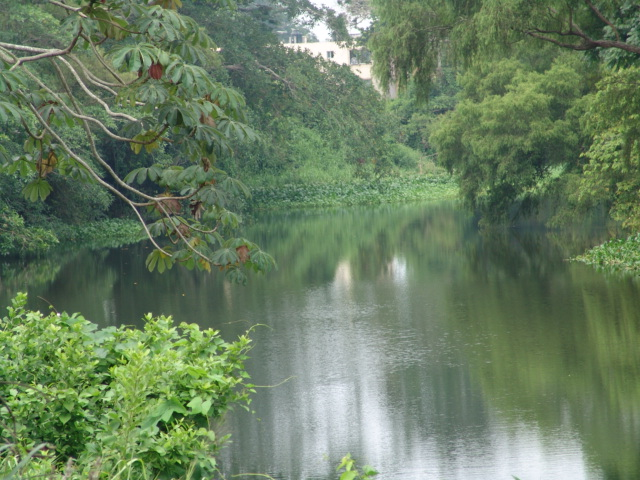
- Río Jamapa at the height of the town Casa Blanca, Veracruz.

Location
- Country: Mexico

Physical characteristics
- Mouth: Gulf of Mexico
  - location: Boca del Río, Veracruz

The Río Jamapa is located in the Mexican state of Veracruz, forming in Citlaltépetl (also known as Pico de Orizaba) and pouring into the Gulf of Mexico in the municipality of Boca del Río (Mouth of the River).

== See also ==
- List of longest rivers of Mexico
