= Urique River =

Location
- Country: Mexico

The Urique River is a river of Mexico, forming part of the Copper Canyon.

== See also ==
- List of rivers of Mexico
