= Tomatlán River =

- Location of mouth

Location
- Country: Mexico
- State: Jalisco

Physical characteristics
- Mouth
  - coordinates: 19°50′30″N 105°22′20″W

The Tomatlán River is a river of Jalisco, Mexico.

== See also ==
- List of rivers of Mexico
