= Bejucos River =

The Bejucos River is a river of Mexico.

== See also ==
- List of rivers of Mexico
