= Chacala River =

River in Mexico

Chacala River Rio Chacala
- Location of mouth

Location
- Country: Mexico
- States: Colima and Jalisco

Physical characteristics
- Mouth
  - coordinates: 19°09′02″N 104°35′20″W

The Chacala River (Cihuatlán River, Marabasco River) is a river of Mexico. It originates in the Sierra de Manantlán, and flows southwestwards to empty into the Pacific Ocean, forming the border between the states of Jalisco to the northwest and Colima to the southeast.

== See also ==
- List of rivers of Mexico
