= Del Rosario River =

River in Mexico

- Location of mouth

Location
- Country: Mexico
- State: Baja California

Physical characteristics
- Mouth
  - coordinates: 32°20′00″N 117°03′00″W

The Del Rosario River is a river of Mexico.

== See also ==
- List of rivers of Mexico
