= Ometepec River =

River in Mexico

- Location of mouth

Location
- Country: Mexico
- State: Guerrero

Physical characteristics
- Mouth
  - coordinates: 16°32′57″N 98°35′02″W

The Ometepec River is a river of Guerrero, Mexico.

== See also ==
- List of rivers of Mexico
