= Concepción River =

River in Mexico

- Location of mouth

Location
- Country: Mexico
- State: Chiapas

Physical characteristics
- Mouth
  - coordinates: 15°19′56″N 92°31′46″W

The Concepción River (or just Concepción) is a river in Chiapas, Mexico.

== Other rivers ==
There is also a Rio Concepción in Sonora, Mexico (30.528027, -112.98392).

== See also ==
- List of longest rivers of Mexico
- List of rivers of Mexico
