= Papagayo River =

River in Mexico

- Location of mouth

Location
- Country: Mexico
- State: Guerrero

Physical characteristics
- Mouth
  - coordinates: 16°41′05″N 99°36′38″W
  - elevation: Sea level

The Papagayo River is a river in Guerrero state of southern Mexico. Its headwaters are in the Sierra Madre del Sur, and it drains southwards to empty into the Pacific Ocean southeast of the city of Acapulco.

The natural vegetation varies with elevation. Pine–oak forest is the predominant at higher elevations in the upper watershed. tropical dry forest grows at middle and low elevations. Much of the original vegetation has been altered by human activity, and there are extensive areas of secondary vegetation, including woodland, shrubland, and savanna, as well as cropland, forest plantation, and livestock pasture.

== See also ==
- List of rivers of Mexico
