= Río Verde (Oaxaca) =

River in Oaxaca, Mexico

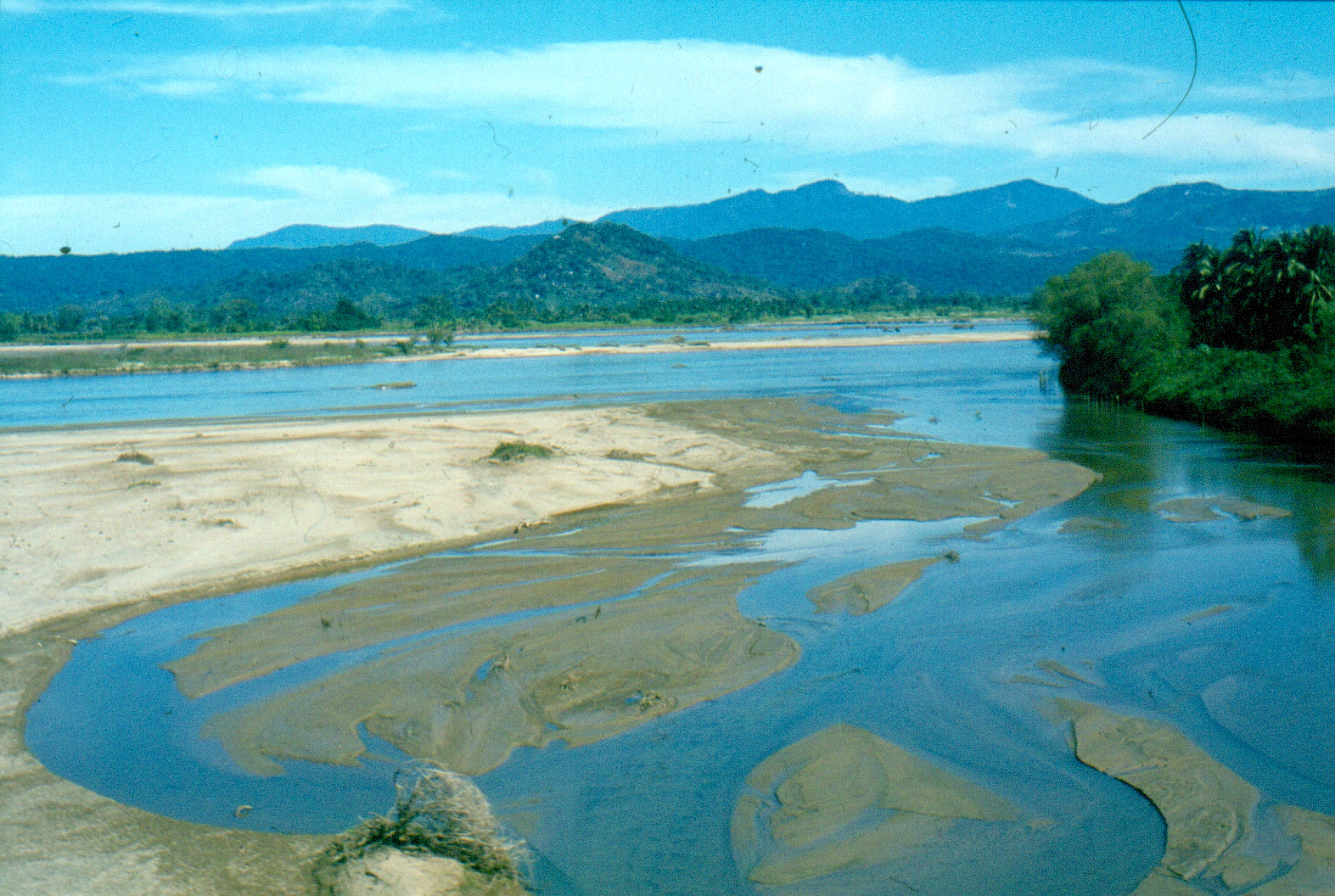
- The mouth of the Río Verde, photographed in 1981

- Location of mouth
- Etymology: Spanish: green river

Location
- Country: Mexico
- State: Oaxaca

Physical characteristics
- Source: Confluence of the Atoyaquillo and Colorado Rivers
  - location: Santiago Ixtayutla, Oaxaca, Mexico
  - coordinates: 16.593°N 97.623°W
- Mouth: Pacific Ocean
  - location: El Azufre, Oaxaca, Mexico
  - coordinates: 15.984°N 97.792°W
- Length: 342 km (213 mi) (Note: Combined length of the Atoyac and lower Verde)
- Basin size: 18,812 km^{2} (7,263 sq mi)

The Río Verde is a river in the state of Oaxaca in Mexico. It is formed by the confluence of the Atoyaquillo and Colorado Rivers near the village of Santiago Ixtayutla and flows south to its mouth at El Azufre on the Pacific Ocean, on the western border of Lagunas de Chacahua National Park. Its major tributary is the Atoyac, which drains the Oaxaca Valley and flows into the Río Verde at Paso de la Reina, where a proposal to build a large hydroelectric dam project has been opposed by local communities. The combined length of the Atoyac and lower Verde rivers is 342 kilometres (213 mi) and the river system as a whole drains a watershed of 18,812 square kilometres (7,263 sq mi), which has a mean natural surface runoff of 6,046 hm^{3} (2.135×10^{11} cu ft) per year. The watershed covers almost a fifth of Oaxaca state and is home to over a third of its population, and faces serious degradation issues as a result of pollution and overexploitation.

Well-studied Mesoamerican civilizations flourished in the valleys of Oaxaca, Ejutla and Nochixtlán, all of which lie in the Verde–Atoyac basin. The floodplains of the lower Río Verde valley also began to support large populations and complex society in the Late Formative period (400–100 BC). The site of Río Viejo emerged as a regional centre during the Miniyua phase (150 BC–100 AD), developing massive public architecture by the Late Classic period (550–800 AD). In the Postclassic period development shifted away from the floodplains to the city-state of Tututepec, located in the foothills about 16 km east of Río Viejo.

In the context of freshwater fish biogeography, the Verde–Atoyac basin is considered the southern extent of the Nearctic realm on the Pacific coast.

== Hydroelectric plant ==
At least five activists were murdered in 2021 for their opposition to the construction of a hydroelectric plant on the river.
