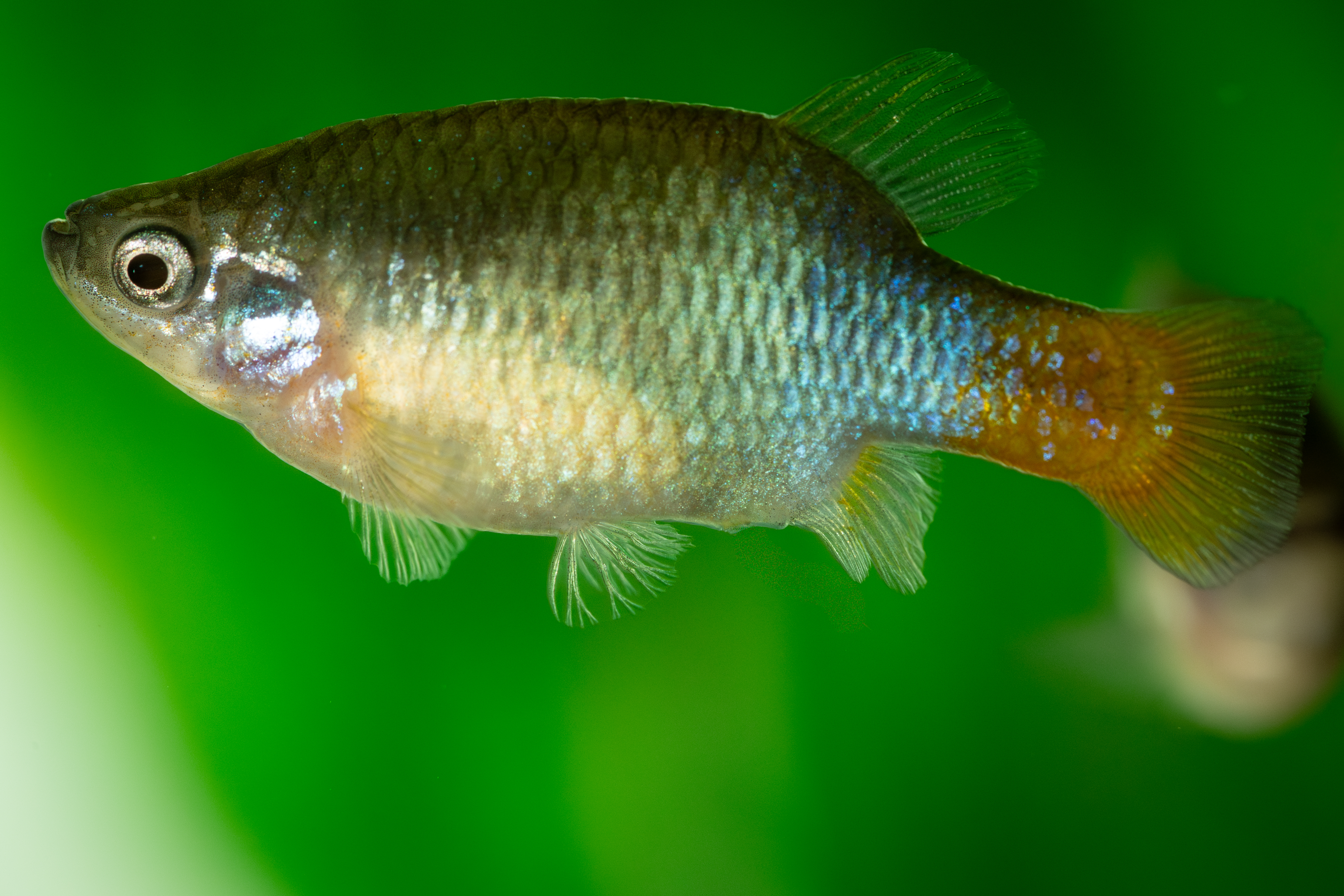
- Male

Conservation status
- Endangered (IUCN 3.1)

Scientific classification
- Kingdom: Animalia
- Phylum: Chordata
- Class: Actinopterygii
- Order: Cyprinodontiformes
- Family: Goodeidae
- Genus: Xenotoca
- Species: X. eiseni

Binomial name
- Xenotoca eiseni (Rutter, 1896)

Synonyms
- Characodon eiseni Rutter, 1896

= Redtail splitfin =

Species of fish

The redtail splitfin or redtail goodeid (Xenotoca eiseni) is a species of goodeid fish from the family Goodeidae and subfamily Goodeinae. Like other members of Goodeinae, the redtail splitfin is native to Mexico and a livebearer. However, the goodeid mating system differs in several ways from the more common livebearing fish from the family Poeciliidae that includes guppies and swordtails. While no goodeid species is a very popular aquarium fish, the redtail splitfin is one of the most popular. Only the male has the red-orange tail for which it is named. Its specific name honours the collector of the type, Gustav Eisen (1847–1940) who was Curator of Marine Invertebrates at the California Academy of Sciences in San Francisco, California.

== Range and habitat ==
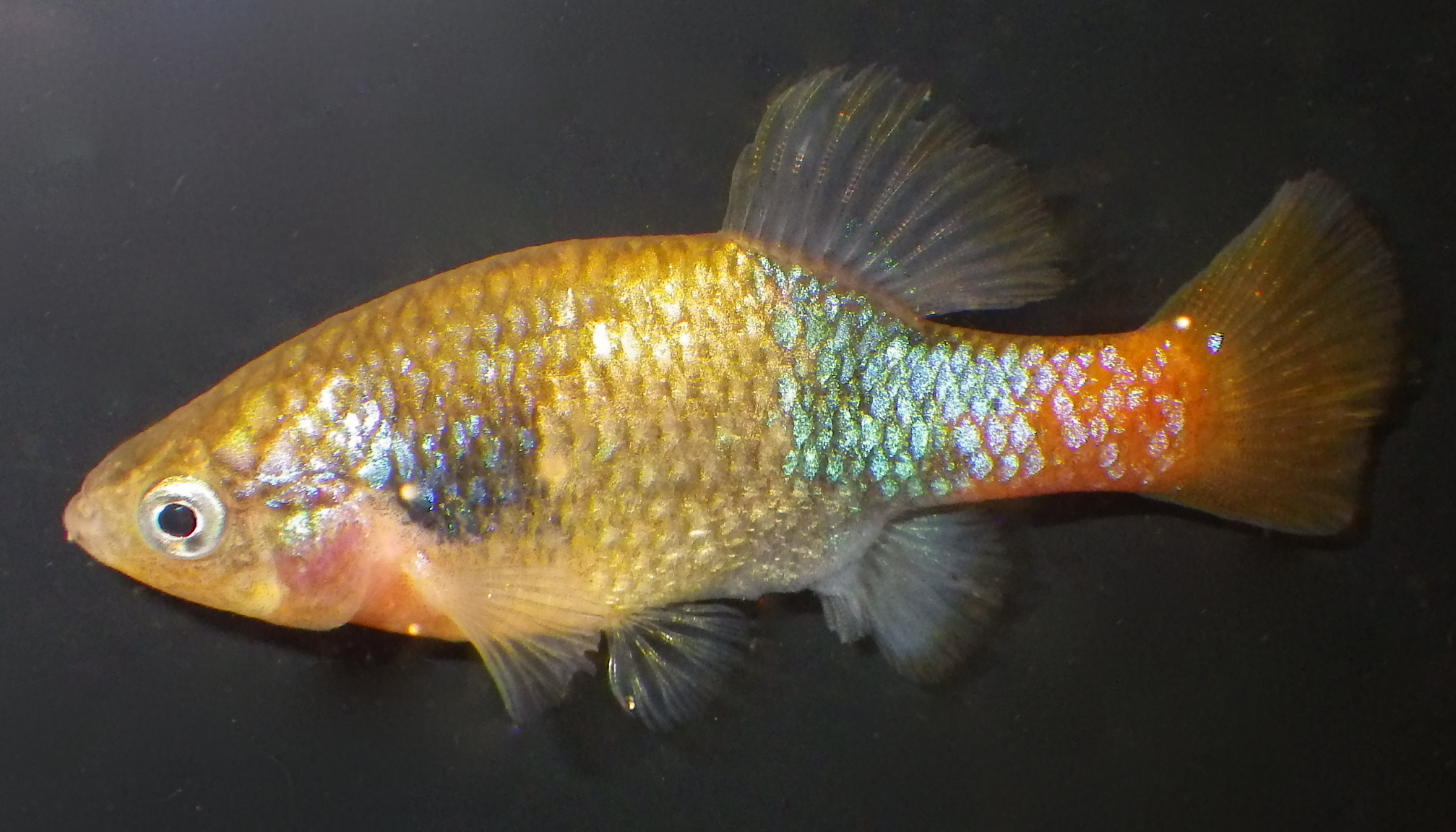
The colorful San Marcos variant was formerly included in X. eiseni, but in 2016 it was described as a separate species, X. doadrioi

The redtail splitfin comes from west-central Mexico in the Grande de Santiago River basin and waters near Compostela, Nayarit. It might also occur in the uppermost Ameca and Armería River basins, but the taxonomic position of these populations remains unclear. Two additional populations, one from an endorheic basin in the Etzatlán region and another from the Coahuayana River, were formerly included in this species, but in 2016 they were described as X. doadrioi and X. lyonsi respectively.

The redtail splitfin inhabits springs, pools, lakes, creeks and rivers, typically in places with little or no aquatic vegetation. It prefers shallow waters.

== Description ==
The redtail splitfin is a deep-bodied fish, and males have a hump behind the head. The hump gets larger as the males get older. Adult males have a red-orange tail and tail-base. The upper part of the body and head are olive-brownish to dusky. A broad, poorly defined bluish-black band runs from the gill cover to the tail, but it virtually disappears on the mid-body region. The throat and belly or yellowish to whitish. Females lack the red-orange and are overall more plainly colored. Females are generally slightly larger than males. Females grow to 7 centimeters (2.8 inches) while males grow to 6 centimeters (2.4 inches) total length.

Among goodeids, the distinct red-orange tail and tail-base is unique to the males of the redtail splitfin and its close relatives X. doadrioi and X. lyonsi.

== Breeding ==
Male goodeids like the redtail splitfin have a notched anal fin that gives the fish the name "splitfin", instead of the gonopodium of poeciliids. This notched anal fin, or andropodium, is used to transmit sperm to the female. The female nourishes the unborn young via trophotaeniae, which function like an umbilical cord in mammals.

Females give birth about every 2 months to 10 to 50 fry. The newborn redtail splitfin fry are relatively large compared to most newborn livebearer fry, at about 15 millimeters (2/3 of an inch) long.

In the wild, both male and female redtail splitfins prefer to mate with fish of similar size. This limits the sexual advantage to males that grow especially large. This minimizes the sexual dimorphism in the size of the fish between males and females.

== Aquarium keeping ==
The redtail splitfin is not a very common aquarium fish, but it is one of the most common goodeids to be kept in the aquarium. They are not very demanding in the aquarium, although they prefer hard, alkaline water. They can tolerate a wide range of water temperatures, from 15 to 30 degrees Celsius (59 to 86 degrees Fahrenheit). They accept a wide range of foods, but do require some vegetable matter in their diets. Although they are generally peaceful, they are known to occasionally nip the fins of fellow aquarium residents. This behavior can be reduced by keeping the redtail splitfin in schools.
