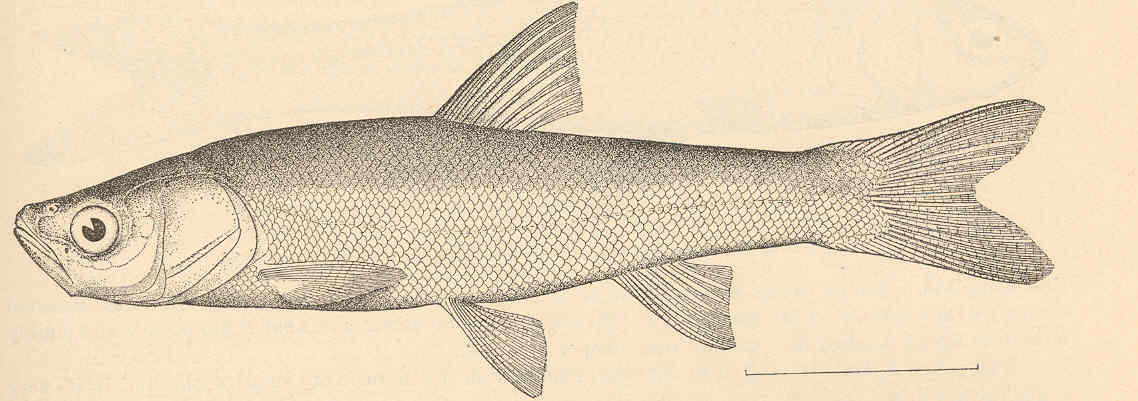
- Algansea popoche

Scientific classification
- Kingdom: Animalia
- Phylum: Chordata
- Class: Actinopterygii
- Order: Cypriniformes
- Family: Leuciscidae
- Subfamily: Pogonichthyinae
- Genus: Algansea; Girard, 1856

Type species
- Leuciscus tincella Valenciennes, 1844

Species
- See text

Synonyms
- Xystrosus D. S. Jordan & Snyder

= Algansea =

Genus of fishes

Algansea is a genus of ray-finned fish in the family Leuciscidae, distributed in the Lerma–Chapala–Grande de Santiago, Pátzcuaro, Armería, Ameca, Ayutla and Tuxpan basins in west-central Mexico (mostly Jalisco, but also surrounding states and the State of Mexico). The genus includes both species that are locally numerous, and species that are highly threatened. Their closest relative is the longfin dace (Agosia chrysogaster).

Algansea are fairly small fish that typically are between 5 and 15 cm (2–6 in) in standard length, although A. lacustris and A. popoche can reach up to 23–26 cm (9–10 in). The different species are generally quite similar in their appearance, being yellowish- or olive-brown overall; darker on the upperparts and paler, more silvery on the underparts. They have a long blackish line along the side of the body from the gill covers to the tail base, or a blackish spot at the base of the tail.

== Species ==
There are currently eight recognized species in this genus:

- Algansea amecae Pérez-Rodríguez, Pérez-Ponce de León, Domínguez-Domínguez & Doadrio, 2009 (Ameca chub)
- Algansea aphanea C. D. Barbour & R. R. Miller, 1978 (riffle chub)
- Algansea avia C. D. Barbour & R. R. Miller, 1978 (remote chub)
- Algansea barbata Álvarez & Cortés, 1964 (Lerma chub)
- Algansea lacustris Steindachner, 1895 (Pátzcuaro chub)
- Algansea monticola C. D. Barbour & Contreras-Balderas, 1968 (mountain chub)
- Algansea popoche (D. S. Jordan & Snyder, 1899) (popoche chub)
- Algansea tincella (Valenciennes, 1844) (spottail chub)
