= Riffle chub =

Conservation status
- Endangered (IUCN 3.1)

Scientific classification
- Kingdom: Animalia
- Phylum: Chordata
- Class: Actinopterygii
- Order: Cypriniformes
- Family: Leuciscidae
- Subfamily: Pogonichthyinae
- Genus: Algansea
- Species: A. aphanea

Binomial name
- Algansea aphanea C. D. Barbour & R. R. Miller, 1978

Species of fish

The riffle chub (Algansea aphanea) is a species of freshwater fish in the family Cyprinidae that is endemic to the Armería, Ayutla and Tuxpan river basins in Jalisco and Colima of west-central Mexico. This threatened species is generally found in small rivers and streams in fast-flowing waters that are 18–22 °C (64–72 °F). It typically is 5–10 cm (2–4 in) long.
