= Mountain chub =

Conservation status
- Near Threatened (IUCN 3.1)

Scientific classification
- Kingdom: Animalia
- Phylum: Chordata
- Class: Actinopterygii
- Order: Cypriniformes
- Family: Leuciscidae
- Subfamily: Pogonichthyinae
- Genus: Algansea
- Species: A. monticola

Binomial name
- Algansea monticola C. D. Barbour & Contreras-Balderas, 1968

Subspecies
- Algansea monticola archidion Barbour & Miller, 1994; Algansea monticola monticola Barbour & Contreras-Balderas, 1968

Species of fish

The mountain chub (Algansea monticola) is a species of freshwater fish in the family Leuciscidae; the shiners, daces and minnows. This species is endemic to the Huaynamota (part of the Grande de Santiago River basin), Juchipila (upper Lerma River basin) and Bolaños rivers (forming a link between Huaynamota and Juchipila) in west-central Mexico.
