= Lerma =

Lerma may refer to:

== Places ==
=== Argentina ===
- Rosario de Lerma
- Rosario de Lerma Department, a department located in Salta Province

=== Italy ===
- Lerma, Piedmont

=== Mexico ===
- Lerma, Campeche
- Lerma, State of Mexico
  - Lerma railway station (State of Mexico)
- Lerma Region
- Lerma River, Mexico's second-longest river

=== Philippines ===
- Lerma station (MRT), Manila

=== Spain ===
- Ducal Palace of Lerma
- Lerma, Province of Burgos, municipality in Castile and León

== People ==
- Arnie Lerma (1950–2018), American writer and Scientology critic
- Carlos de Lerma (born 1984), Spanish footballer
- Dominique-René de Lerma (1928–2015), American musicologist
- Duke of Lerma (title)
- Lerma Gabito (born 1974), Filipino long jumper
- Gilberto Lerma Plata (born 1962/63), Mexican drug lord
- Hernando de Lerma (1541–?), Spanish conquistador
- Jefferson Lerma (born 1994), Colombian professional footballer
- Joan Lerma (born 1951), Spanish politician
- Juan Lerma Gómez (born 1955), Spanish neuroscientist
- Luigi de Lerma (1907–1965), Italian ceramist

== Other ==
- Lerma chub, species of fish
- VAM Lerma, an automobile manufactured by Vehículos Automotores Mexicanos
