= Xenotoca lyonsi =

Conservation status
- Critically Endangered (IUCN 3.1)

Scientific classification
- Kingdom: Animalia
- Phylum: Chordata
- Class: Actinopterygii
- Division: Teleostei
- Order: Cyprinodontiformes
- Family: Goodeidae
- Genus: Xenotoca
- Species: X. lyonsi

Binomial name
- Xenotoca lyonsi Domínguez-Domínguez, Bernal-Zuñiga & Piller, 2016

Species of fish

Xenotoca lyonsi, the Tamazula redtail splitfin, is a bony fish species in the goodeid family. Until 2016 it was considered to be a variant of the redtail goodeid, Xenotoca eiseni. A 2016 study by Omar Dominguez-Dominguez, et al. split the redtail goodeid into three separate species: Xenotoca eiseni, Xenotoca doadrioi and Xenotoca lyonsi.

== Etymology ==
The fish is named in honor of the ichthyologist John Lyons, of the Wisconsin Department of Natural Resources.

The IUCN lists Xenotaca lyonsi as critically endangered.

Xenotoca lyonsi is endemic to the Coahuayana River drainage in Jalisco, Mexico.

Xenotoca lyonsi reaches a standard length of 5 centimetres (2.0 in). Males are more colorful than females, with red caudal fin and caudal peduncle, and blue area in front of the red. Females are brownish or brownish grey, and sometimes have a horizontal dark band across the middle of the body.
