= Spottail chub =

Conservation status
- Least Concern (IUCN 3.1)

Scientific classification
- Kingdom: Animalia
- Phylum: Chordata
- Class: Actinopterygii
- Division: Teleostei
- Order: Cypriniformes
- Family: Leuciscidae
- Subfamily: Pogonichthyinae
- Genus: Algansea
- Species: A. tincella

Binomial name
- Algansea tincella (Valenciennes, 1844)

Synonyms
- Algansea affinis Regan, 1907; Algansea alvarezi Romero, 1967; Algansea dugesi Bean, 1892; Algansea paratincella Alvarez, 1963; Algansea rubescens Meek, 1902; Algansea stigmatura Regan, 1907; Leuciscus tincella Valenciennes, 1854; Zophendum australe Jordan, 1880

Species of fish

The spottail chub (Algansea tincella) is a species of freshwater fish in the family Leuciscidae, the shiners, daces and minnows. This fish is endemic to the Lerma–Chapala basin and upper Santa Maria (Tampoán) system in west-central Mexico. Populations of the Ameca River basin were formerly included in this species, but are now recognized as A. amecae.

There are some minor local variations in the appearance of A. tincella, but they all have a dark spot at the base of the tail. The species generally is about 5–11.5 cm (2.0–4.5 in) in standard length.
