= Pátzcuaro chub =

Conservation status
- Critically Endangered (IUCN 3.1)

Scientific classification
- Kingdom: Animalia
- Phylum: Chordata
- Class: Actinopterygii
- Order: Cypriniformes
- Family: Leuciscidae
- Subfamily: Pogonichthyinae
- Genus: Algansea
- Species: A. lacustris

Binomial name
- Algansea lacustris Steindachner, 1895

Synonyms
- Algansea tarascorum Steindachner, 1895

Species of fish

The Pátzcuaro chub (Algansea lacustris) is a species of freshwater fish in the family Leuciscidae, the shiners, daces and minnows. It is endemic to Lake Pátzcuaro and nearby waters (part of the upper Lerma River basin) in west-central Mexico. This is a relatively large Algansea, reaching a size similar to the popoche chub.
