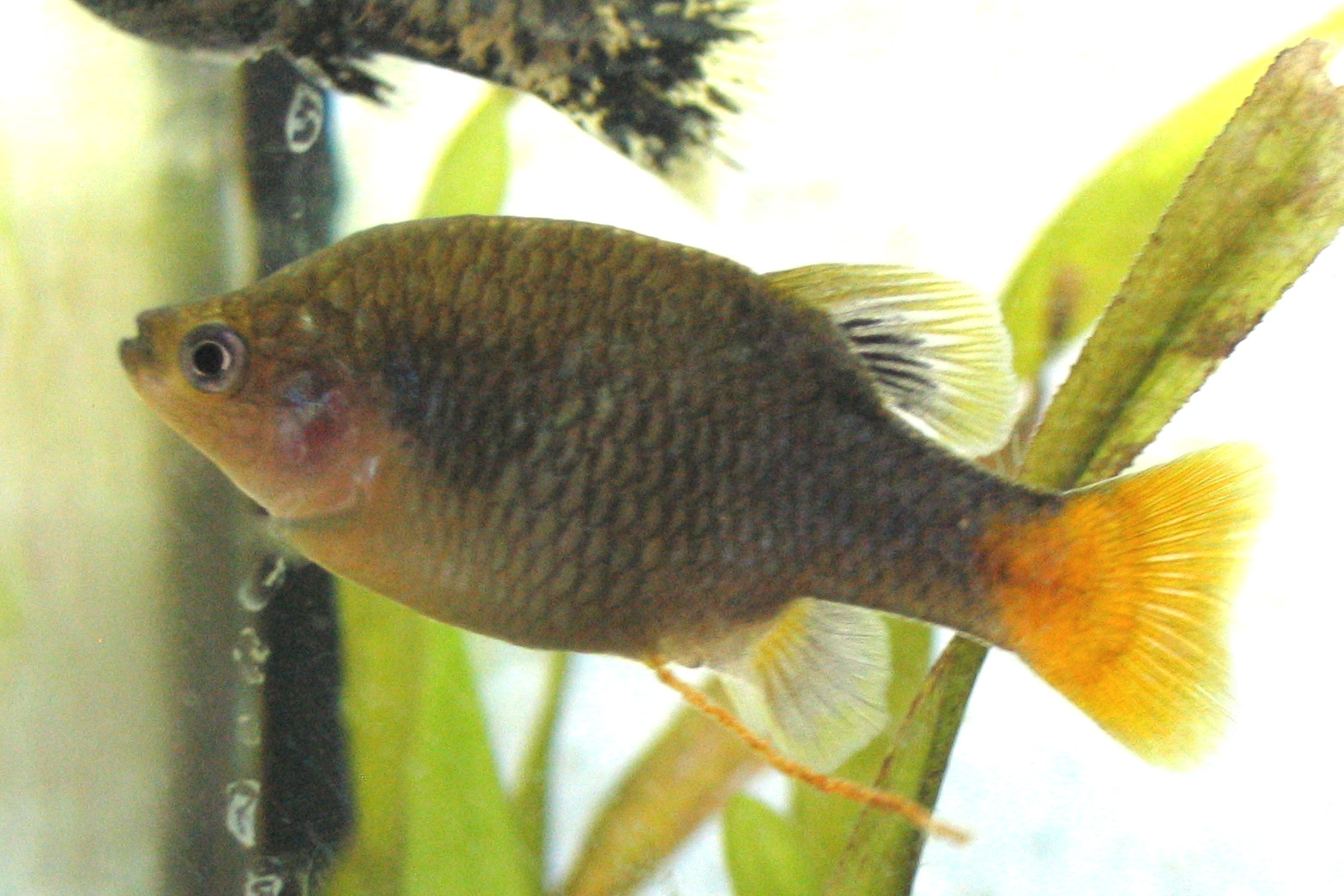
- Xenotoca eiseni

Scientific classification
- Kingdom: Animalia
- Phylum: Chordata
- Class: Actinopterygii
- Order: Cyprinodontiformes
- Family: Goodeidae
- Subfamily: Goodeinae
- Genus: Xenotoca; C. L. Hubbs & C. L. Turner, 1939

Type species
- Characodon variatus Bean, 1887

= Xenotoca =

Genus of fishes

Xenotoca is a genus of fish in the family Goodeidae from Mexico, where various species are found in a wide range of habitats, from rivers and creeks to pools and lakes, in the Lerma–Grande de Santiago, Panuco, Cuitzeo and other basins of the Mesa Central. While no goodeid is a very common aquarium fish, the redtail splitfin (X. eiseni), is one of the most common aquarium goodeids; its bright colors offset its reputation for being aggressive towards and occasionally even killing tankmates. Similarly to X. eiseni, two species described in 2016 have males with red-orange tails, but this feature is not shared by the remaining members of the genus. All Xenotoca species are relatively small, reaching up to 9 cm (4 in) in standard length.

== Species ==
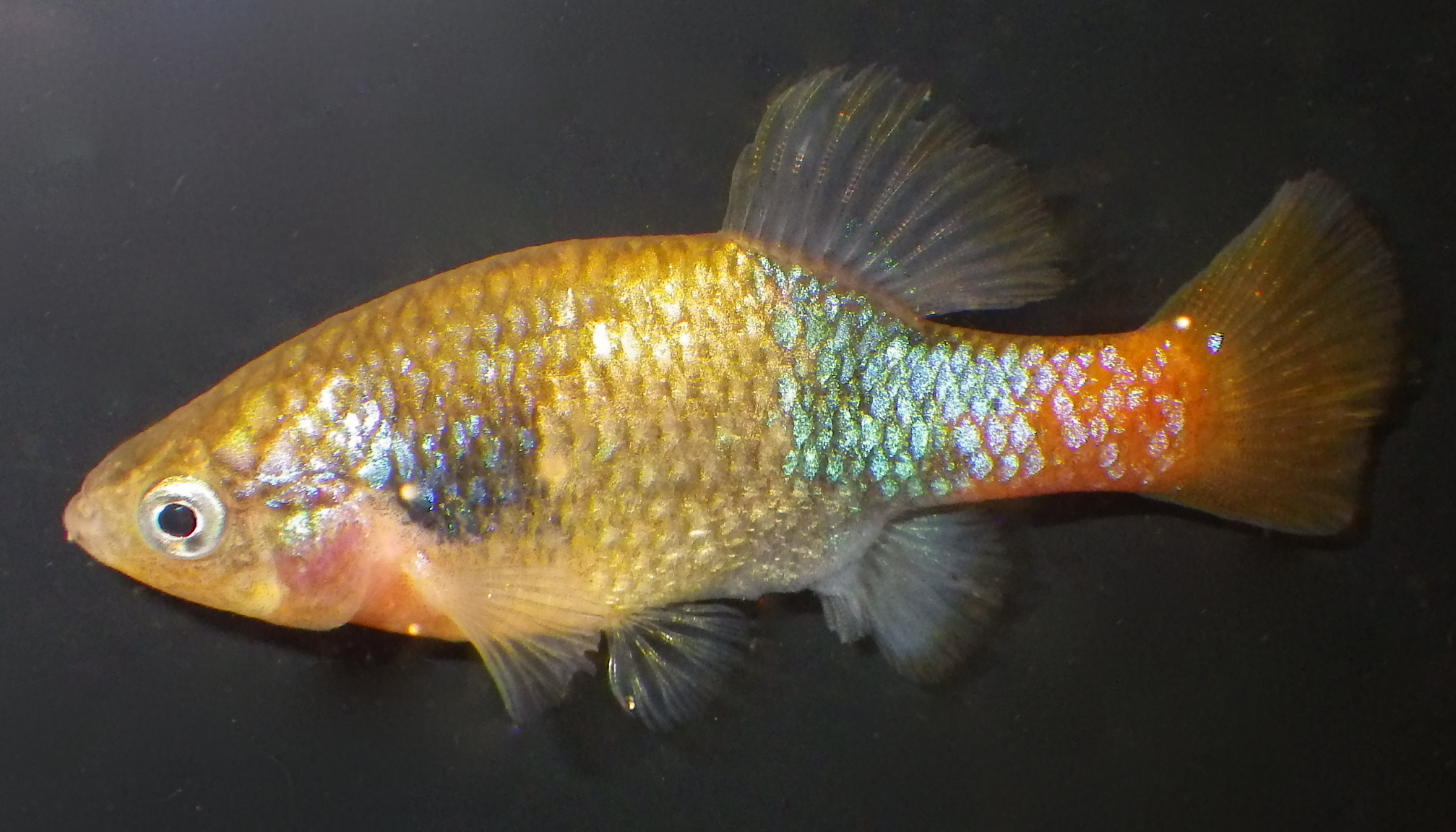
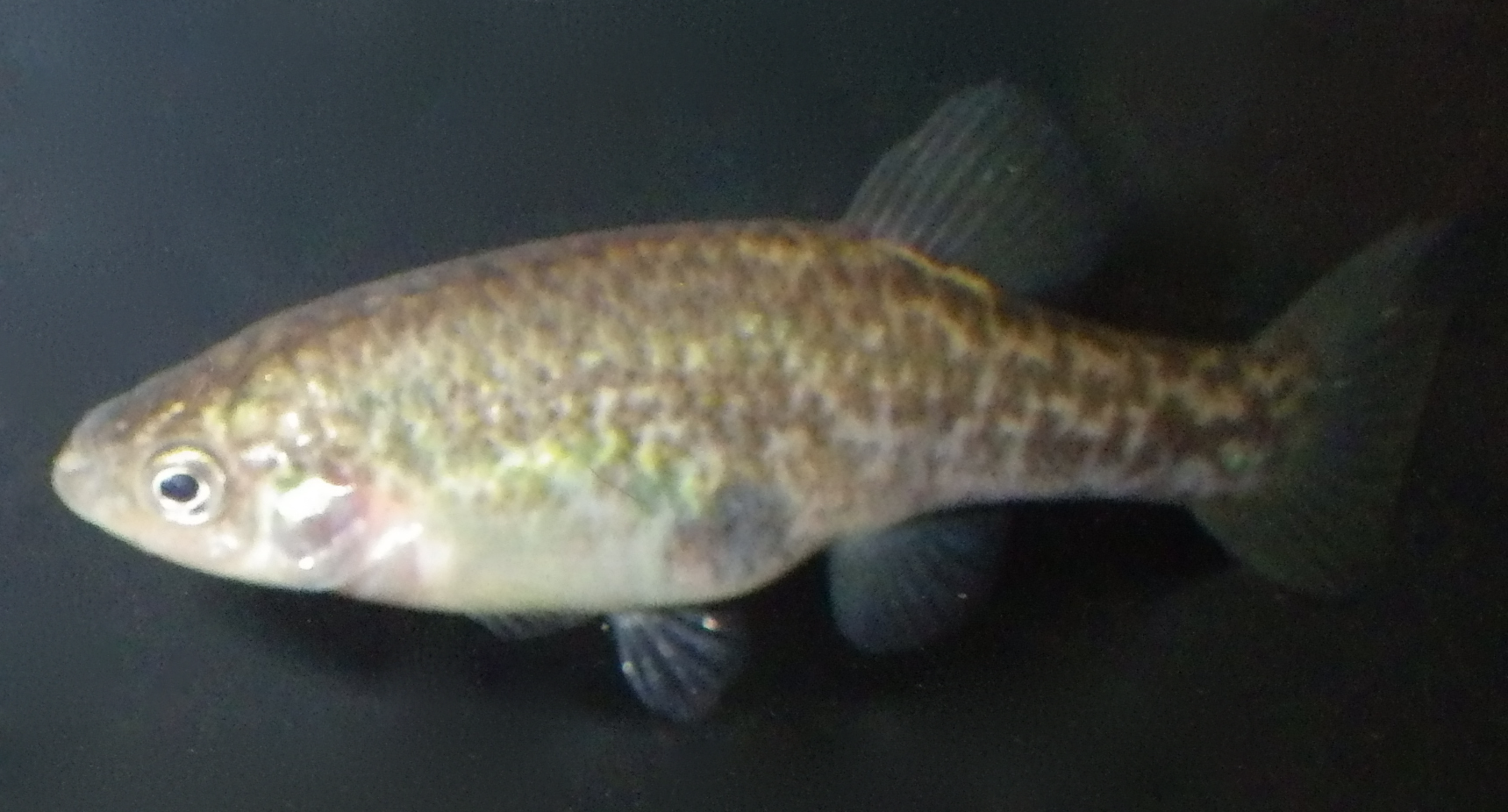
X. doadrioi was only scientifically described in 2016 (it was formerly considerec a variant of X. eiseni). Like the other "redtails", only the male has a red-orange tail

There are currently five recognized species in this genus, but two possibly undescribed species, tentatively referred to as Xenotoca cf. melanosoma and Xenotoca cf. variata, are known.

Genetic work has shown that the genus, as currently defined, is not monophyletic: The type species X. variata is distantly related to the remaining, which could eventually be reallocated to their own genus. Phylogenic research by Shane Webb showed that the closest relative of X. variata is the butterfly goodeid, Ameca splendens.

- Xenotoca doadrioi Domínguez-Domínguez, Bernal-Zuñiga & Piller, 2016 (San Marcos redtail splitfin)
- Xenotoca eiseni (Rutter, 1896) (Redtail splitfin)
- Xenotoca lyonsi Domínguez-Domínguez, Bernal-Zuñiga & Piller, 2016
- Xenotoca melanosoma Fitzsimons, 1972 (Black splitfin)
- Xenotoca variata (T. H. Bean, 1887) (Jeweled splitfin)
