= IBRO Neuroscience Reports =

- Discipline: Neuroscience
- Language: English
- Edited by: Y.S. Chan

Publication details
- History: 2016–present
- Publisher: Elsevier on behalf of the International Brain Research Organization
- Frequency: Continuous
- Open access: Yes
- License: CC BY and CC BY-NC-ND

Standard abbreviations
- ISO 4: IBRO Neurosci. Rep.

Indexing
- ISSN: 2451-8301
- OCLC no.: 1004966910

Links
- Journal homepage; Online archive

IBRO Neuroscience Reports (formerly known as IBRO Reports) is a peer-reviewed open-access scientific journal covering neuroscience. It was established in 2016 and is published by Elsevier on behalf of the International Brain Research Organization (IBRO). It is the sister journal of IBRO's main journal, Neuroscience. The editor-in-chief is Y.S. Chan (The University of Hong Kong). The journal is abstracted and indexed in Scopus, and PubMed Central.
