= Arturo León Lerma =

Mexican politician (1937–2026)

- Born: 1 March 1937; Álamos, Sonora, Mexico
- Died: 19 February 2026 (aged 88); Hermosillo, Sonora, Mexico
- Occupation: Politician
- Political party: PRI

Arturo León Lerma (Note: In this Mexican name, the surname is Leon and the second or maternal family name is Lerma.) (1 March 1937 – 19 February 2026) was a Mexican politician from the Institutional Revolutionary Party (PRI). From 2000 to 2003 he served as a federal deputy in the 58th Congress, representing Sonora's seventh district.

After starting in the front office of the Mayos de Navojoa in the 1970s, León Lerma served as president of the Liga Mexicana del Pacífico from 1981 to 1985, and again from 1989 to 2000, before finishing his executive career with a 14-year stint with the Naranjeros de Hermosillo. He was inducted into the 2011 class of the Mexican Professional Baseball Hall of Fame as an executive.

León Lerma died on 19 February 2026, at the age of 88.
