= Guadalajara Zoo =

Zoologico y Safari Guadalajara
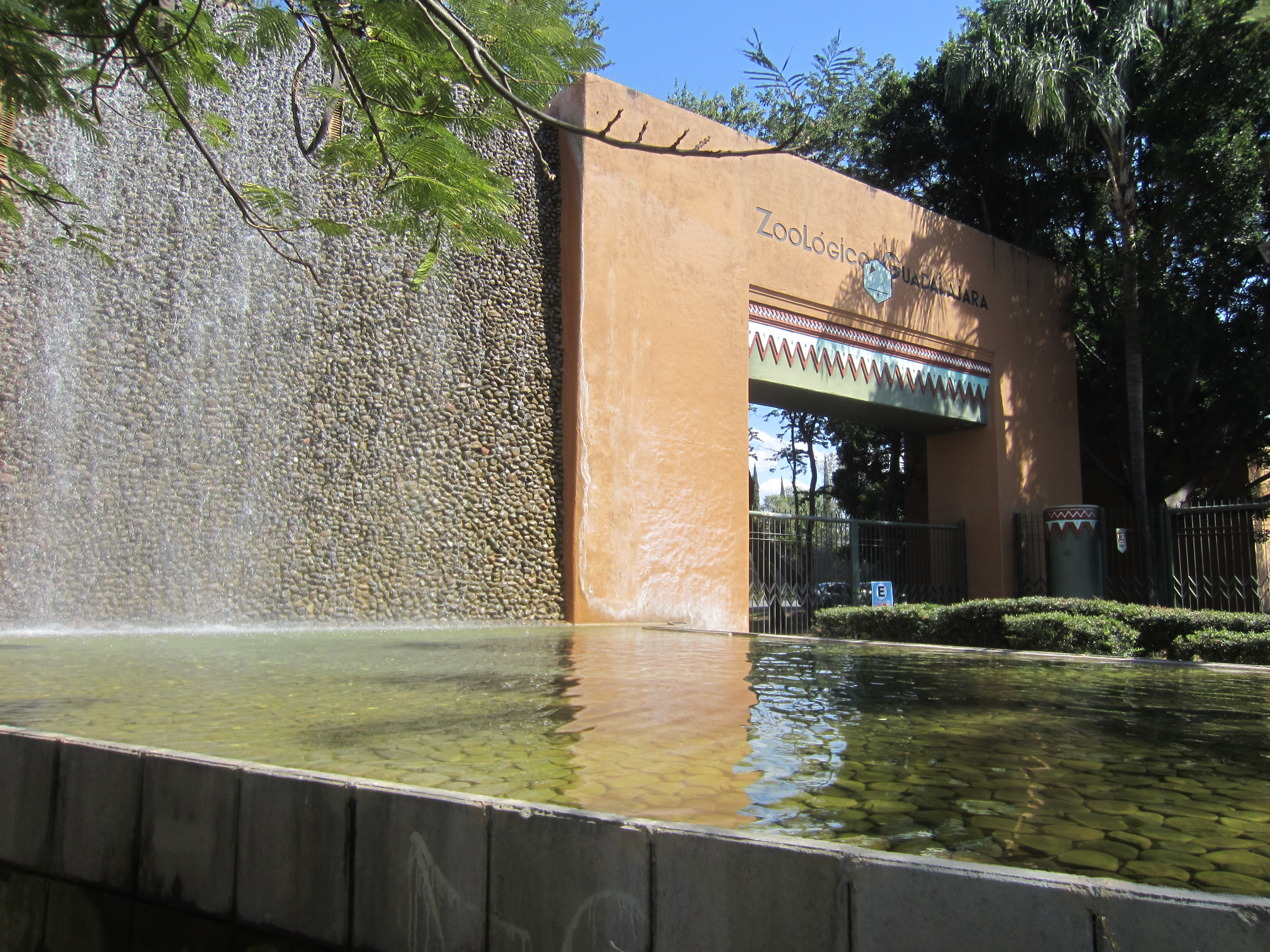
- Zoo entrance (2021)
- Interactive map of Zoologico y Safari Guadalajara
- 20.7283813°N 103.3083326°W
- Date opened: March 11, 1988
- Location: Guadalajara, Jalisco, México
- No. of animals: 2,200
- No. of species: 360
- Website: www.zooguadalajara.com.mx

Zoológico Guadalajara (Guadalajara Zoo) is the main zoological park in the Mexican city of Guadalajara, Jalisco, and is widely considered one of the most important in Latin America. It is the largest in the country with respect to species population.

The zoo is located on the Barranca de Oblatos (Huentitan Canyon), a natural park in the limits of the city which is in fact one of the natural spots the zoo has been trying to preserve.

== History ==
Zoológico Guadalajara started operating in 1988 as a project to promote conservation and research. As the first true zoo of the city, and the largest in the state of Jalisco, the park has been enormously successful and is one of Guadalajara's most popular tourist attractions.

After gang-related violence broke out following the killing of drug cartel leader Nemesio Oseguera Cervantes in February 2026, the zoo became a refuge for more than 1,000 stranded visitors.

== Animals and exhibits ==
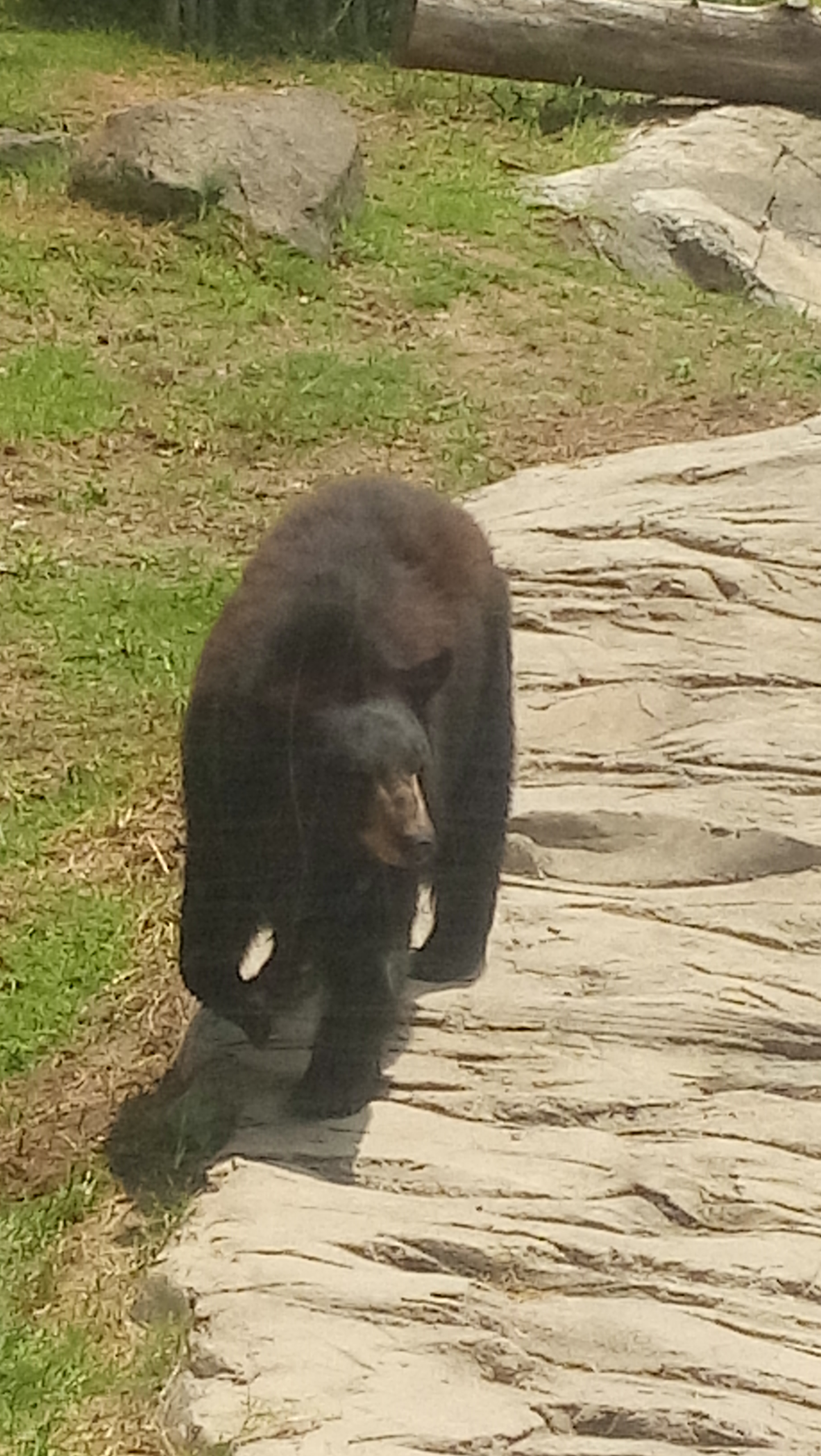
Black bear in Guadalajara Zoo

The Guadalajara Zoo is noted for its diversity of species, especially birds. There are many species of mammals as well, including some endangered species from Mexico. Some species are important for conservation; for example, the zoo has bred the rare Mexican wolf and Morelet's crocodile.

- Antártida: A chilled exhibit featuring Adélie penguins and gentoo penguins. Since 2015, the penguins are kept in a large, closed habitat which mimics the cold temperatures from the Antarctic, and provides them with land and water.
- Villa Australiana: In 2007, ten red kangaroos were imported from Texas. Unfortunately, the same year, seven of the kangaroos died due to violent electric storms that stressed them. The area also holds Australian birds like budgerigars, rainbow lorikeets and sulphur-crested cockatoos.
- Aquarium: 95 species of fishes including clownfish, butterflyfish, surgeonfish, stingrays, sharks and other aquatic creatures freshwater and saltwater are housed.
- Puerto Manati: A pair of Antillean manatees named Claudia and Lorenzo arrived at the zoo in August 2021 as part of a captive breeding program.
- Monkeyland: This area features several types of primates such as ring-tailed lemurs, patas monkeys, vervet monkeys, squirrel monkeys, capuchin monkeys, as well as a troop of western lowland gorillas.
- Safari Masai Mara: Among its inhabitants are African elephants, reticulated giraffes, Grant's zebras, African buffalo, blue wildebeest, impala, common elands, scimitar oryxes, waterbuck, white rhinos, ostriches, greater flamingos and grey crowned cranes. Cheetahs are housed in a separate enclosure. Visitors can take the ride on a train-like vehicle, while a guide dressed as a member of the Masai tribe gives information about the animals and Masai traditions.
- Michilia: Two habitats replicate the La Michilía Biosphere Reserve, housing Mexican wolves and American black bears.
- Herpetarium: Widely known as the largest reptile house in Latin America, the building houses boa constrictors, Egyptian cobras, rattlesnakes, Mexican beaded lizards, tortoises and arachnids. The Herpetarium was part of the original design of the zoo, and today remains one of its most popular attractions.
- Los Secretos de la Selva Tropical: This exhibit includes animals from the tropical rainforest ecosystems of four different continents. Among them there are Bengal tigers, jaguars, Baird's tapirs, southern cassowaries, chimpanzees and Bornean orangutans
- Aviaries: Birds are the most abundant kind of animals in the zoo. There are many large cages around the limits of the zoo housing large bird species, like four species of macaws (blue-and-yellow, green-winged, military & scarlet), three species of amazon parrots (red-crowned, white-fronted & yellow-headed) and yellow-throated toucans. There are also several kinds of raptors like great horned owls, king vultures, and golden eagles. There are also two large pyramidal aviaries that house songbirds and tropical birds, specially those found in Mexico such as horned guans, great curassows and West Mexican chachalacas.
- Other animals housed in the zoo include American bison, American flamingos, Barbary sheep, bighorn sheep, blackbuck, black swans, capybaras, chital, cougars, coyotes, dromedary camels, elk, fallow deer, hippopotamus, lions, llamas, Morelet's crocodiles, sika deer and white-tailed deer.

=== Famous inhabitants ===
Among the most famous animals in the zoo's collection are:

- White tiger: White tigers have been one of the zoo's main attractions almost since the park opened its doors. One of their white tigers was the mother of Mantacore, the tiger who mauled Roy Horn from Siegfried & Roy. Many of the white tigers used by Siegfried & Roy in their show were born in the Guadalajara Zoo. The zoo also has normal coloured tigers. Six litters of Bengal tigers have been born in the zoo, all of them sired by the park's resident tiger Niño, who has the tiger's normal coloration but also white genes on his own heritage, which enables him to sire both orange and white cubs.
- Western lowland gorilla: The zoo's silverback gorilla, nicknamed Chato by his handlers, escaped his enclosure once. Gorillas have reproduced twice in the Guadalajara Zoo. He died in 2009.
- Baird's tapir: One of the zoo's tapirs, Norton, was used by Mel Gibson in the movie Apocalypto for the tapir hunt sequence at the beginning of the film. He is housed in the Tropical Rainforest section of the park.
- Morelet's crocodile: The most endangered crocodile in Mexico has reproduced well in the Guadalajara Zoo. Many young crocodiles born to the zoo's reproductive couple Juanito and Rosita have been released in the Centla swamps, one of the Morelet's crocodiles' original habitats.
- Hippopotamus: A female hippo named Tequila was famous in the zoo because of its old age (40 years, which is the maximum lifespan for its species) and because it was part of the collection of the now disappeared Agua Azul zoological park. Tequila died recently, but new hippo calves have been born in the zoo.
- American alligator: A male white alligator was a visitor to the zoo during the 1990s. It was nicknamed El Gringo because of its white skin and blue eyes. This was one of 18 leucistic alligators known at the time.
