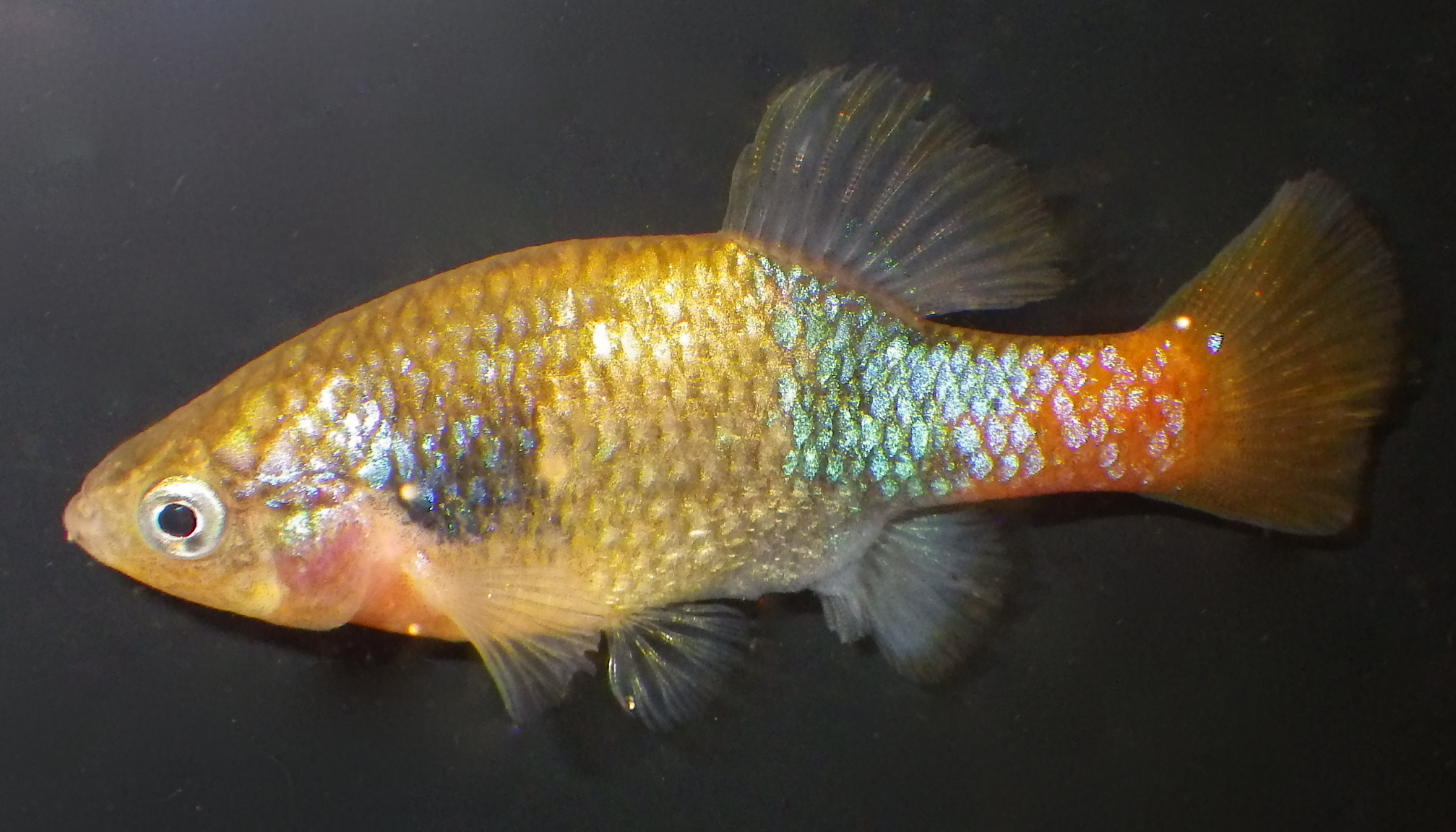
- Male

Conservation status
- Critically Endangered (IUCN 3.1)

Scientific classification
- Kingdom: Animalia
- Phylum: Chordata
- Class: Actinopterygii
- Division: Teleostei
- Order: Cyprinodontiformes
- Family: Goodeidae
- Genus: Xenotoca
- Species: X. doadrioi

Binomial name
- Xenotoca doadrioi Domínguez-Domínguez, Bernal-Zuñiga & Piller, 2016

= Xenotoca doadrioi =

Species of fish

Xenotoca doadrioi or San Marcos redtail splitfin is a bony fish species in the goodeid family. Until 2016 it was considered to be a variant of the redtail goodeid, X. eiseni, sometimes referred to as the San Marcos variant. A 2016 study by Omar Dominguez-Dominguez, et al. split the redtail goodeid into three separate species: X. eiseni, X. doadrioi and X. lyonsi.

== Etymology ==
The fish is named in honor of the ichthyologist Ignacio Doadrio, of the Museo Nacional de Ciencias Naturales in Spain.

The IUCN lists Xenotaca doadrioi as critically endangered.

Xenotoca doadrioi is endemic to the area around Etzatlán in Jalisco, Mexico. It lives in ponds, springs and reservoirs, as well as seasonal streams connected to them. In the wild, it primarily eats algae, aufwuchs, crustaceans and insect larvae.

Females are larger than males, reaching a standard length of 4.7 centimetres (1.9 in). Males reach a standard length of 3.7 centimetres (1.5 in). Males are more colorful than females, with orange to red on the caudal peduncle, and typically blue in front of the red and also an iridescent dark blotch near the pectoral fins. Females are brownish, and often have dark blotches on the body.

Besides coloration, Xenotoca doadrioi differs from Xenotoca eiseni and Xenotoca lyonsi in features such as the number of rays in certain fins and some scale counts.
