= Neuroscience (journal) =

- Discipline: Neuroscience
- Language: English
- Edited by: J. Lerma

Publication details
- History: 1976–present
- Publisher: Elsevier on behalf of the International Brain Research Organization
- Frequency: 28/year
- Open access: Hybrid
- Impact factor: 2.7 (2024)

Standard abbreviations
- ISO 4: Neuroscience

Indexing
- CODEN: NRSCDN
- ISSN: 0306-4522 (print); 1873-7544 (web)
- LCCN: 76648178
- OCLC no.: 780563171

Links
- Journal homepage; Online access; Online archive

Neuroscience is a peer-reviewed scientific journal of neuroscience. It was established in 1976 with P.G. Kostyuk, Rodolfo Llinás, and A.D. Smith as founding editors-in-chief and originally published by Pergamon Press. The current editor-in-chief is Juan Lerma Gómez (Spanish National Research Council). The journal is published by Elsevier on behalf of the International Brain Research Organization (IBRO).

The journal continues the IBRO News section formerly published in Brain Research.

== Abstracting and indexing ==
The journal is abstracted and indexed in:

- BIOSIS Previews
- Current Contents/Life Sciences
- Elsevier Biobase
- Chemical Abstracts Service
- Embase
- Index Medicus/MEDLINE/PubMed
- PASCAL
- Science Citation Index
- Scopus

According to the Journal Citation Reports, Neuroscience has a 2024 impact factor of 2.7.

== Notable articles ==
As of 2018, the following articles are the most downloaded according to the publisher's data:

- Keeler, J.F.; Pretsell, D.O.; Robbins, T.W. (2014). "Functional implications of dopamine D1 vs. D2 receptors: A 'prepare and select' model of the striatal direct vs. indirect pathways". Neuroscience. 282: 156–175. doi:10.1016/j.neuroscience.2014.07.021. PMID 25062777.
- Hernández SE (2018). "Gray Matter and Functional Connectivity in Anterior Cingulate Cortex are Associated with the State of Mental Silence During Sahaja Yoga Meditation". Neuroscience. 371: 395–406. doi:10.1016/j.neuroscience.2017.12.017. hdl:10234/175002. PMID 29275207.
- Humpel, C (2015). "Organotypic brain slice cultures: A review". Neuroscience. 305: 86–98. doi:10.1016/j.neuroscience.2015.07.086. PMC 4699268. PMID 26254240.
- Dalley, J (2012). "Dopamine, serotonin and impulsivity" (PDF). Neuroscience. 215: 42–58. doi:10.1016/j.neuroscience.2012.03.065. PMID 22542672.
- Zorina-Lichtenwalter, K (2016). "Genetic predictors of human chronic pain conditions". Neuroscience. 338: 36–62. doi:10.1016/j.neuroscience.2016.04.041. PMID 27143481.
