= Mololoa River =

- Native name: Río Mololoa (Spanish)

Location
- country: Mexico
- state: Nayarit

Physical characteristics
- Discharge
  - location: Río Grande de Santiago

Basin features
- River system: Río Grande de Santiago

The Mololoa River is a tributary of the Río Grande de Santiago. Located in the Mexican state of Nayarit, it runs through the state capital of Tepic.

== Condition ==
It is very polluted, but in the past was a recreational area for all the Tepic citizens and marked the end of the city. At the moment the local and federal authorities are trying to clean up the river, but all the attempts have so far been in vain.
