= Calvillo River =

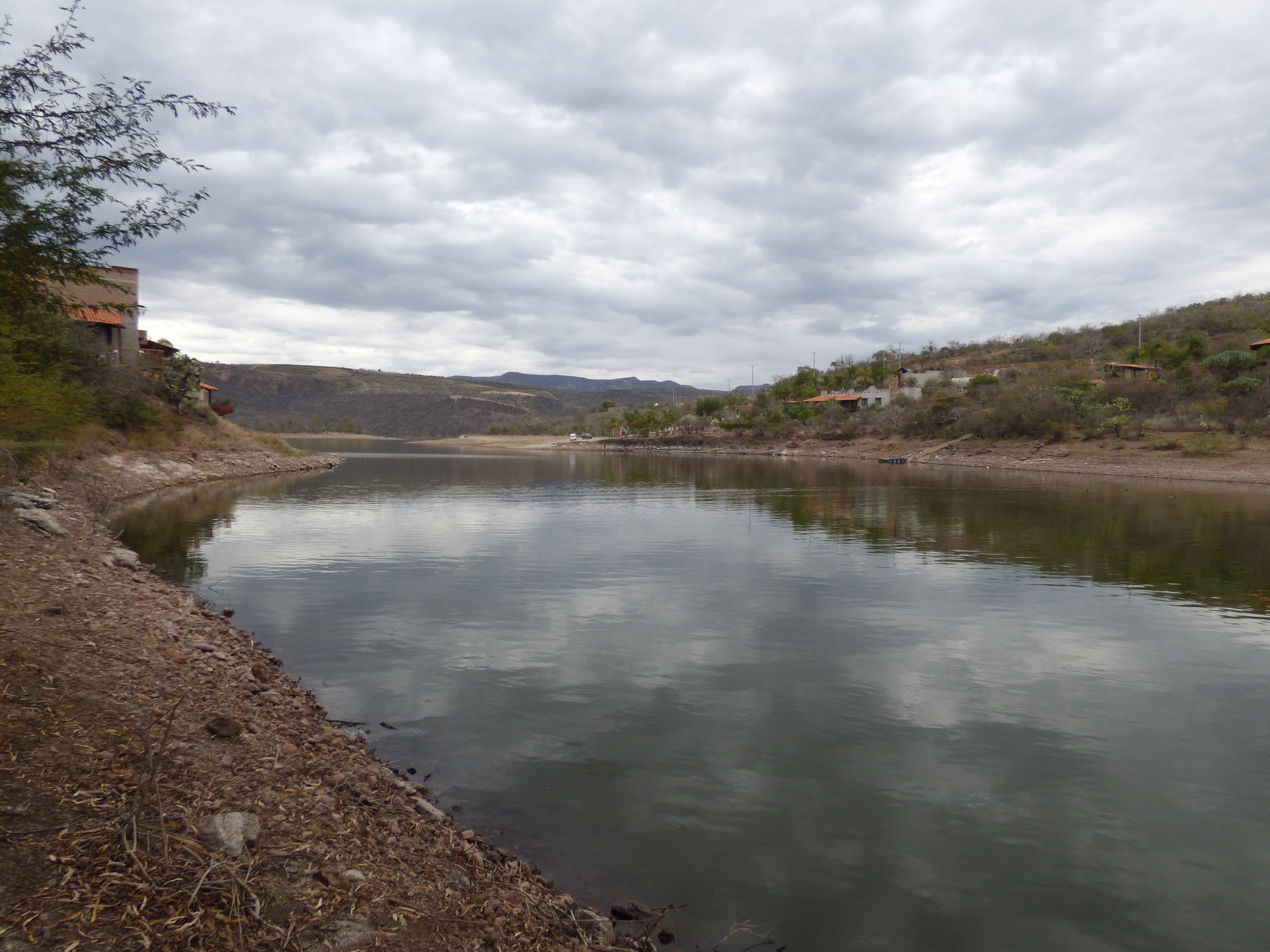
- The river from Presa de Malpaso in Calvillo

Location
- Country: Mexico

Physical characteristics
- Mouth: Juchipila River

The Calvillo River is a river of Mexico. It is a tributary of the Juchipila River in the southern Sierra Madre Occidental.

== See also ==
- List of rivers of Mexico
