= International Brain Research Organization =

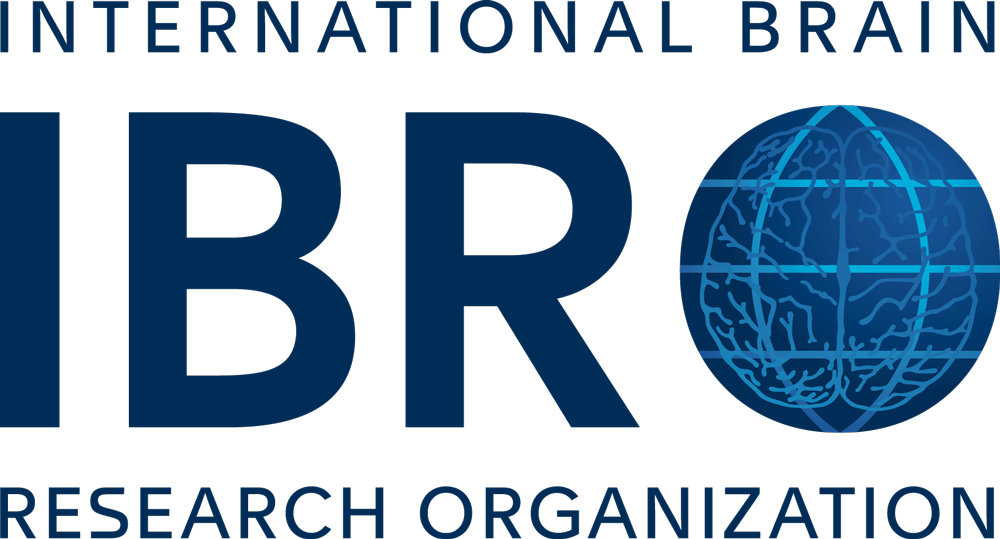
- Abbreviation: IBRO
- Formation: 1961; 65 years ago
- Type: International non-governmental organization
- Headquarters: Brussels
- Region served: Worldwide
- Members: +100
- Official language: English
- President: Tracy Bale
- Website: ibro.org

The International Brain Research Organization (IBRO) is a global association of neuroscience societies that supports neuroscience research and education worldwide through training programs, scientific collaboration, outreach activities, and scientific publishing. IBRO publishes two peer-reviewed journals, Neuroscience and IBRO Neuroscience Reports.

IBRO's membership consists of more than 100 international, national, and regional neuroscience organizations. Representatives of these member organizations form the Governing Council. Together with five regional committees, the organization coordinates activities related to neuroscience research and training across different regions.

In addition, IBRO works with partner scientific societies and organizations on initiatives related to brain research.

== History ==
IBRO was founded in 1961 in response to increasing interest among neuroscientists in establishing an international organization to facilitate communication and collaboration across national boundaries.

IBRO is an independent, international non-governmental organization. According to the organization, its activities include supporting neuroscience research and training worldwide and promoting diversity, equity, and inclusion within the neuroscience community. IBRO reports representing approximately 95,000 neuroscientists globally through its member societies.

== Governance and organization ==
IBRO's governance structure consists of several bodies. The Governing Council, composed of representatives from member societies, is responsible for electing the organization's senior officers. The Board of Directors comprises the elected officers and the chairs of the five regional committees and is responsible for overseeing IBRO's activities. The Board is advised by an advisory board made up of past and incoming officers.

IBRO's officers include the President, Secretary General, and Treasurer. The organization operates through five regional committees — Africa, Asia–Pacific, Latin America, Pan-Europe, and US/Canada — which coordinate activities within their respective regions.

The day-to-day operations of IBRO are managed by a Secretariat led by an executive director. IBRO's offices are located in Brussels, Belgium.

== Programs and activities ==
IBRO supports neuroscience research and training through a range of programs, including grants, fellowships, travel awards, and training initiatives. These include collaborative research grants, exchange fellowships, early-career support programs, parenthood grants, and funding for specialised courses and schools.

The organization also supports educational activities delivered through IBRO-affiliated neuroscience schools, workshops, and short courses in different regions.

Every four years, IBRO organizes the IBRO World Congress of Neuroscience, an international scientific meeting. The 2027 World Congress is scheduled to take place in Cape Town, South Africa.

IBRO also collaborates with partner organizations on outreach and advocacy initiatives related to neuroscience education and research.

== IBRO World Congress ==
The IBRO World Congress of Neuroscience is an international scientific conference organised by IBRO every four years in different world regions. The congress provides a forum for researchers to present and discuss developments in neuroscience and related fields.

In the past 20 years, the IBRO World Congress has been held in the following locations:

- 2023 – Granada, Spain (approximately 2,800 participants)
- 2019 – Daegu, South Korea (approximately 4,385 participants)
- 2015 – Rio de Janeiro, Brazil (approximately 2,500 participants)
- 2011 – Florence, Italy (approximately 4,200 participants)
- 2007 – Melbourne, Australia (approximately 2,500 participants)

The next IBRO World Congress is scheduled to take place in Cape Town, South Africa, in 2027.

== Publications ==
IBRO publishes two peer-reviewed scientific journals:

- Neuroscience – the official journal of IBRO, published on the organization's behalf by Elsevier.
- IBRO Neuroscience Reports – a fully open-access journal published by Elsevier.

== Funding ==
As a non-profit organization, IBRO generates revenue from several sources. According to the organization, its primary source of income is derived from its two official journals, Neuroscience and IBRO Neuroscience Reports. Additional funding is obtained through membership dues and contributions from partner organizations involved in regional and global collaborations.

IBRO publishes annual reports that provide information on its financial position and the use of funds supporting its activities.
