= Remote chub =

Conservation status
- Endangered (IUCN 3.1)

Scientific classification
- Kingdom: Animalia
- Phylum: Chordata
- Class: Actinopterygii
- Order: Cypriniformes
- Family: Leuciscidae
- Subfamily: Pogonichthyinae
- Genus: Algansea
- Species: A. avia

Binomial name
- Algansea avia C. D. Barbour & R. R. Miller, 1978

Species of fish

The remote chub (Algansea avia) is a species of freshwater ray-finned fish in the family Leuciscidae, the shiners, daces and minnows. This fish is endemic to the Grande de Santiago River basin at an altitude of 760–975 m (2,490–3,200 ft) in west-central Mexico. This threatened species is up to 9.5 cm (3.7 in) long.
