= Rogers Warm Spring =

Geothermal spring

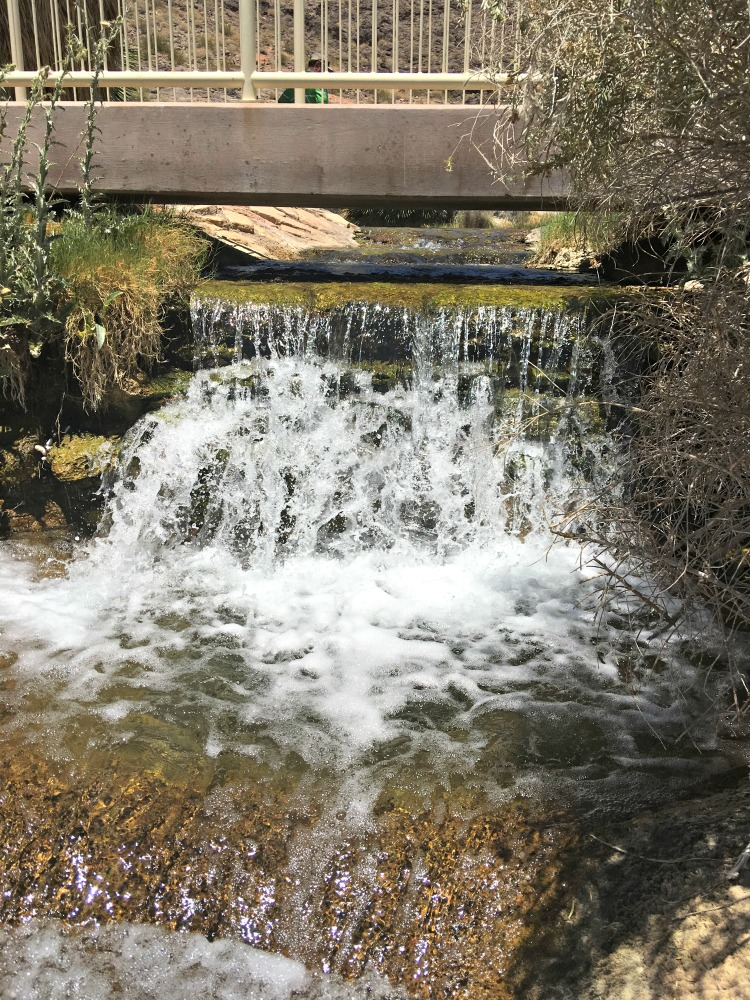
- Interactive map of Rogers Warm Spring
- Location: Near the town of Overton, Nevada
- Coordinates: 36°22′40″N 114°26′37″W
- Elevation: 1,596 ft (486 m)
- Type: geothermal

Rogers Warm Spring is a geothermal spring located in Clark County, Nevada near the town of Overton.

The spring discharges from the Rogers Spring Fault at the side of large collecting pond that is 75' x 75', and is approximately three feet deep. There is a smaller secondary pool with a waterfall. Roger Warm Spring is part of the North Shore Complex terminal discharge area of the carbonate-rock aquifer system located in western Utah and eastern Nevada.

== Water profile ==
The hot mineral water emerges from the spring at 82 °F / 28 °C. On hot days the water temperature in the collecting pond exceeds this temperature. The discharge rate is 1000 gallons per minute.

== Location ==
The spring is located near the Valley of Fire State Park at the north shore of Lake Mead within the Lake Mead National Recreation Area. The GPS coordinates of the spring is N 36 22.680 W 114 26.580.

== History ==
Local native peoples used the springs for years before the area was settled by immigrants. In 1903 a water diversion canal was built to move water to farmlands south of St. Thomas. The project initially failed due to permeable soils in the area, before failing again due to economic issues. Between the years of 1938 to 1943 a water fowl refuge was planned and begun, but the construction was terminated.

== See also ==
- List of hot springs in the United States
- List of hot springs in the world
