= Barranca de Oblatos =

Natural feature in Mexico

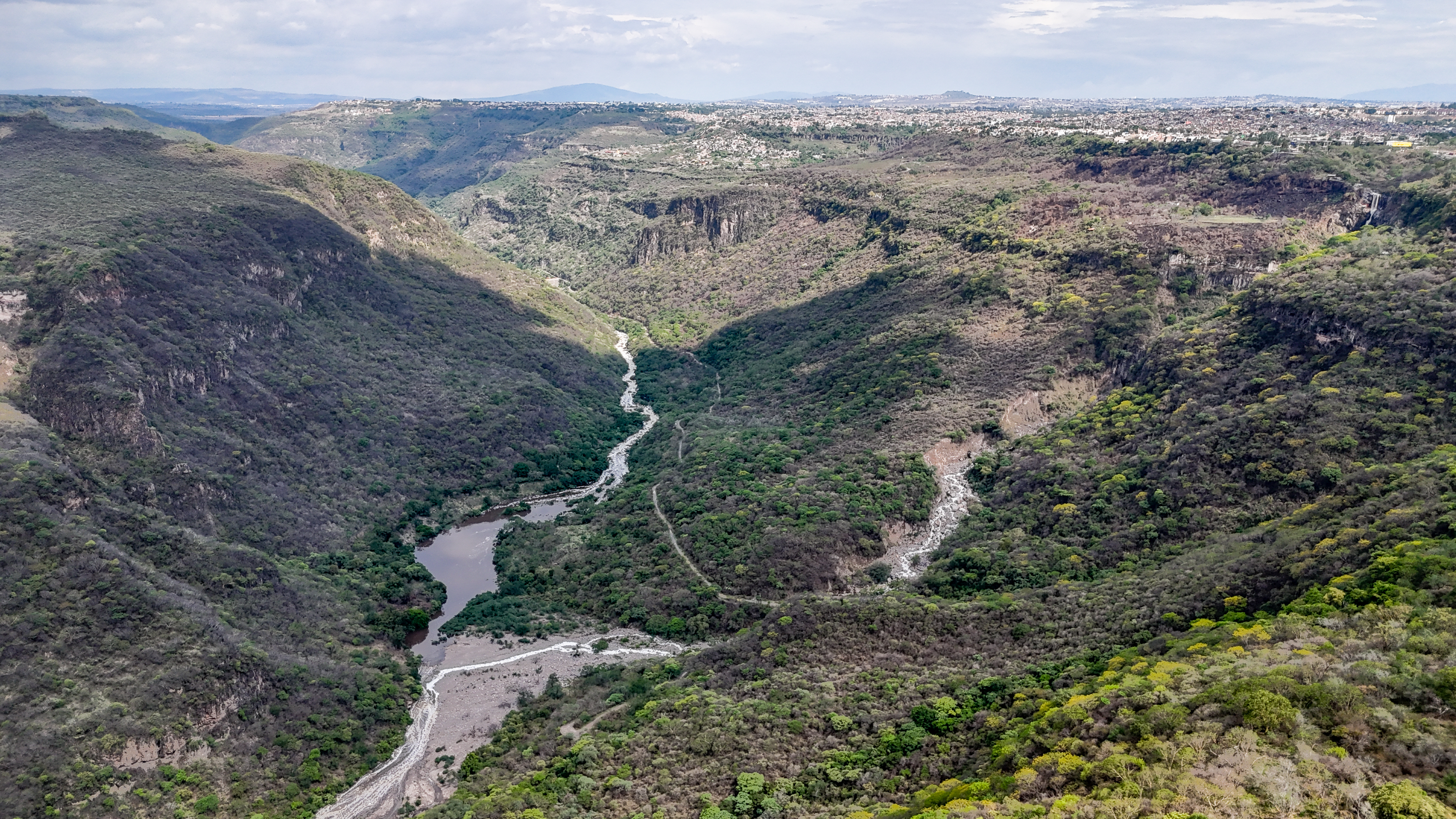
- View of the Río Grande de Santiago, and the Barranca de Oblatos. In the background, the Guadalajara Metropolitan Area.
- Floor elevation: approx. 3,417 feet (1,000 m)
- Length: 16 miles (26 km)
- Width: 2 to 5 miles (3.2 to 8.0 km)

Geography
- Location: Jalisco, Mexico
- Coordinates: 20°42′25″N 103°16′10″W
- Interactive map of Barranca de Oblatos

Barranca de Oblatos (English: Oblatos Canyon), also known as Barranca de Huentitán, is a canyon carved by the Río Grande de Santiago in Mexico in the state of Jalisco. It lies on the northeast side of the municipality of Guadalajara and on the edge of the municipalities of Tonalá, Zapotlanejo, Ixtlahuacán del Río and Zapopan in the Guadalajara Metropolitan Area.

Its beauty and structure make it physically resemble a smaller version of the Grand Canyon in the United States, or Barranca del Cobre in Chihuahua.

It includes approximately 1,137 hectares (2,810 acres) and it has an average depth of 600 metres (2,000 ft). The difference in elevation between the rim of the canyon (1,520 metres (4,990 ft)) and the river (1,000 metres (3,300 ft)) is 520 metres (1,710 ft) at the point of a funicular. This canyon is also named Oblatos-Huentitán due to the areas in the city crossed by it, called Oblatos and Huentitán respectively.

== Human history ==
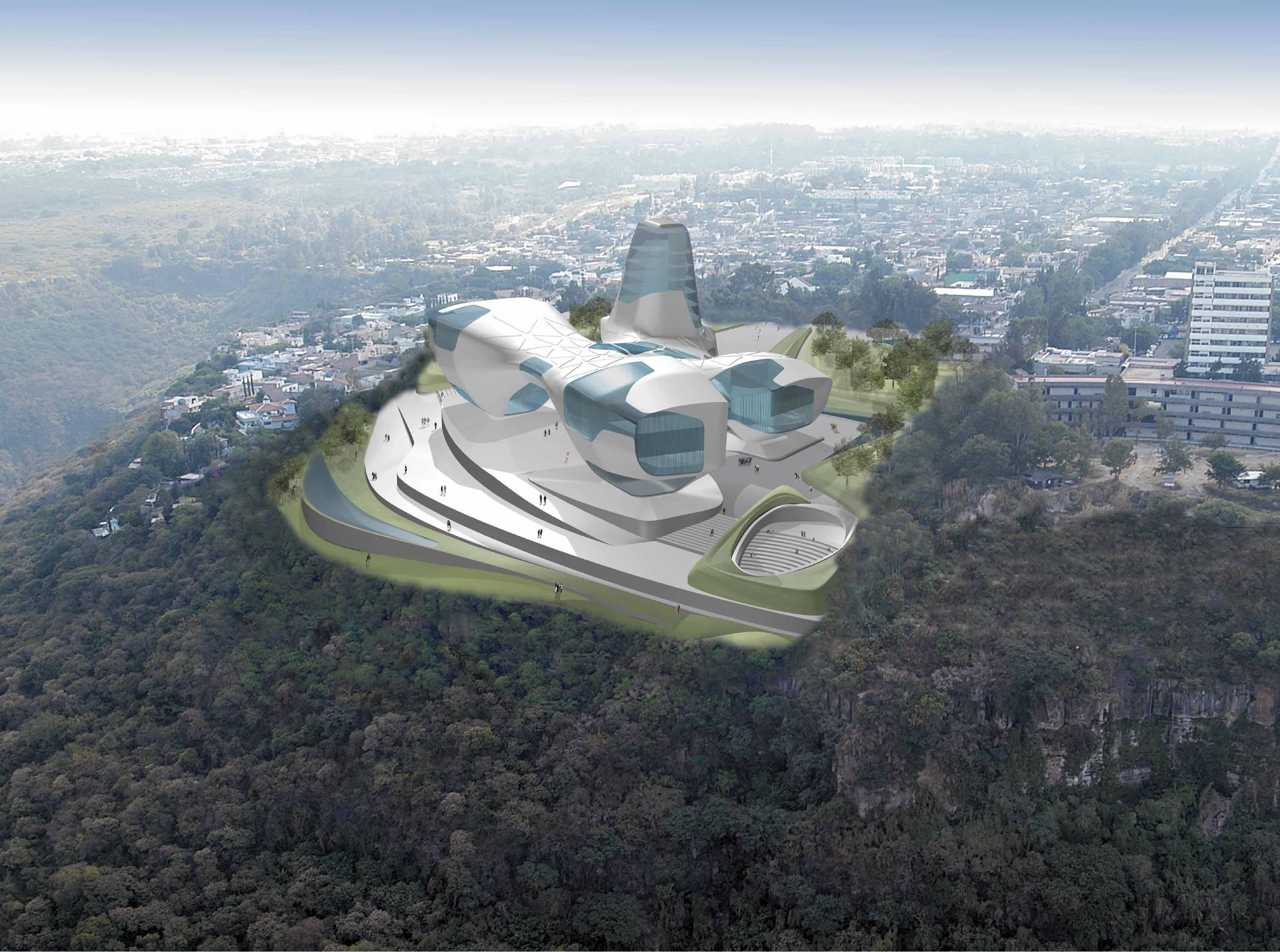
The Guggenheim Guadalajara was expected to be finished in early 2010, but was cancelled by the museum company.

Several important events in the history of Guadalajara occurred in the canyon. In the 19th century, during the Spanish Conquest combat between the indigenous natives of Huentitán and the Spaniards took place in this area. This was also the location of many battles of the Mexican Revolution and Cristero War. A flooding took place during the Porfiriato era (1876-1911).

== Protected area ==
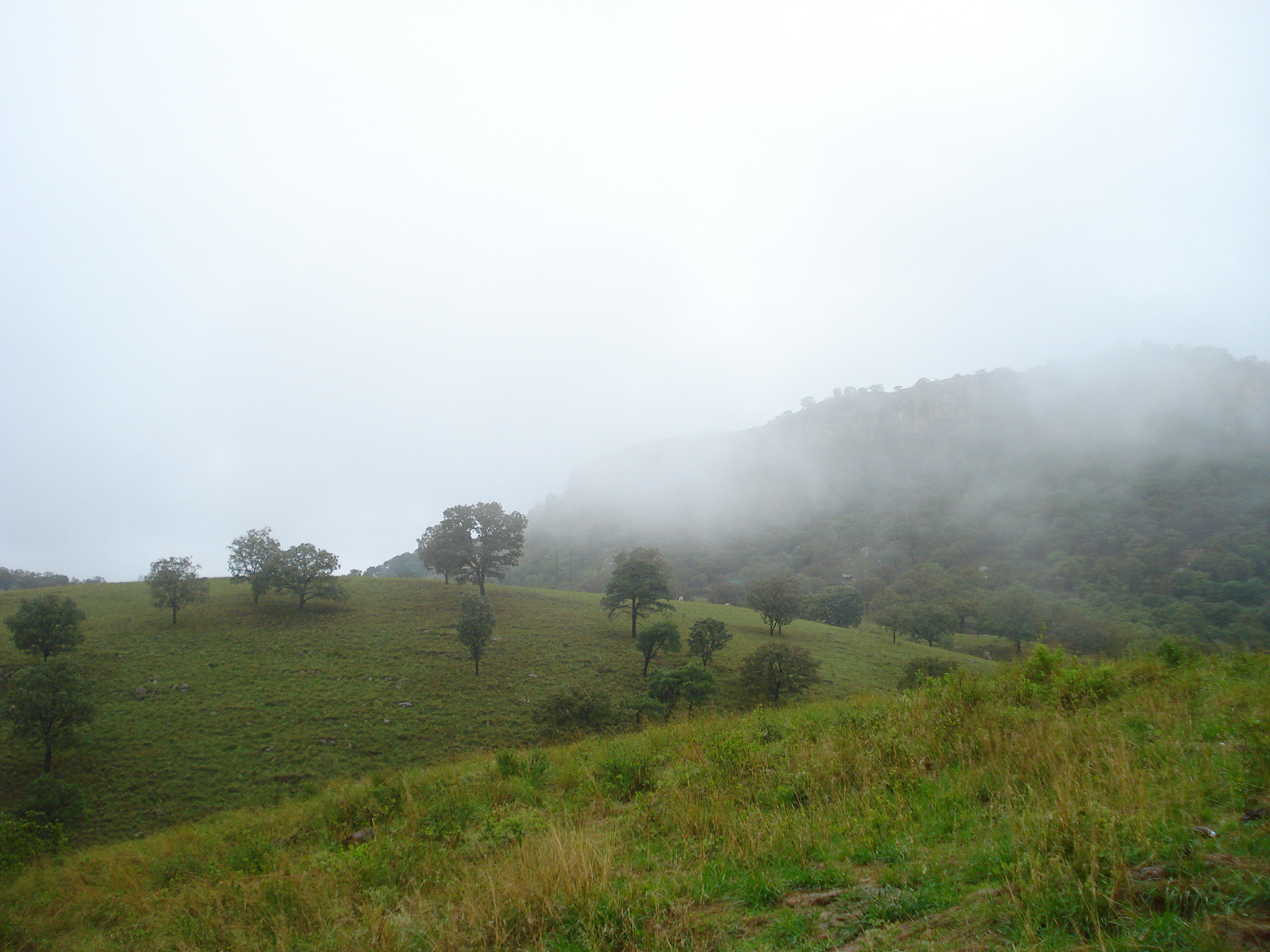
Near Guadalajara

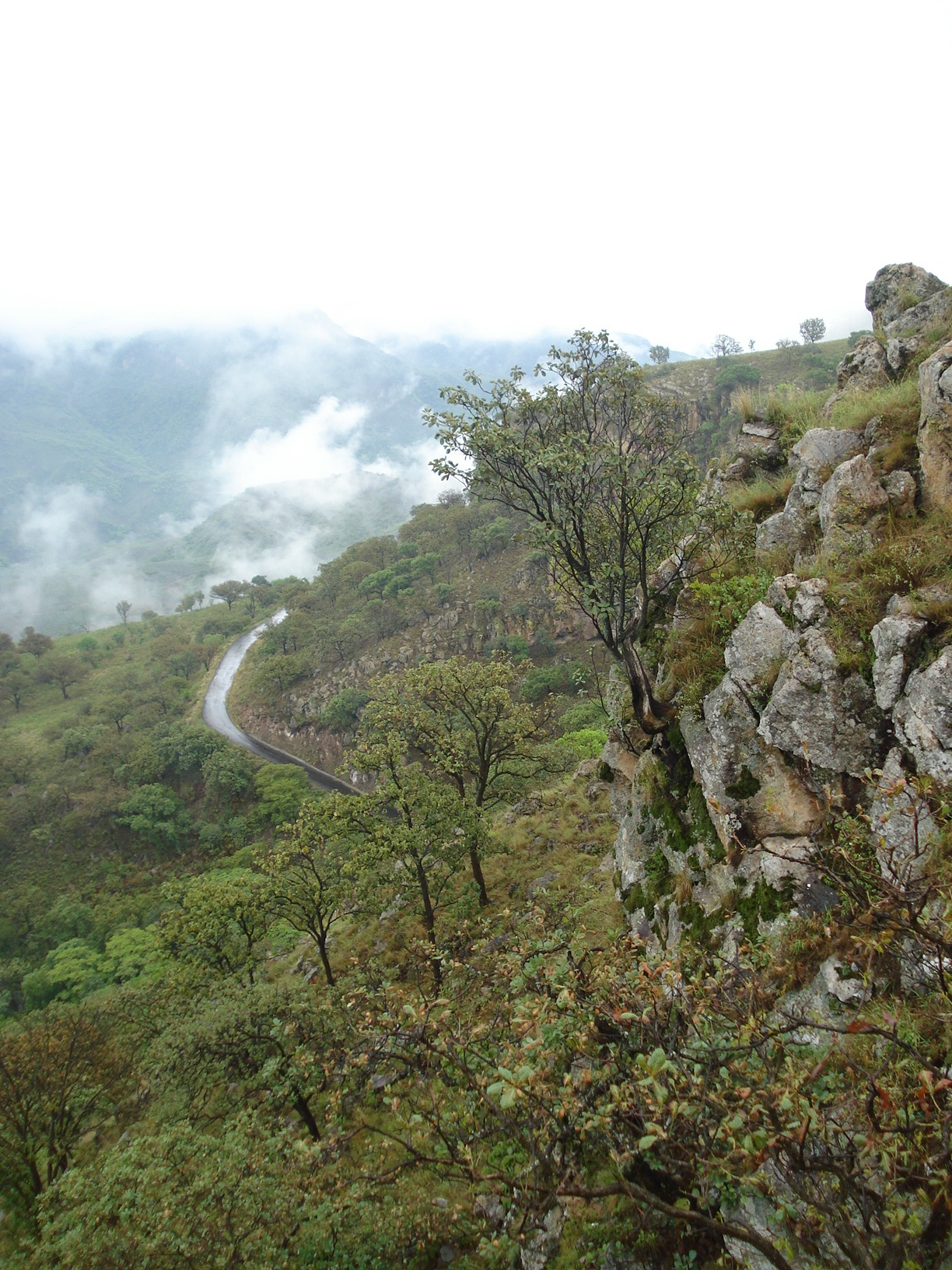
Near Guadalajara

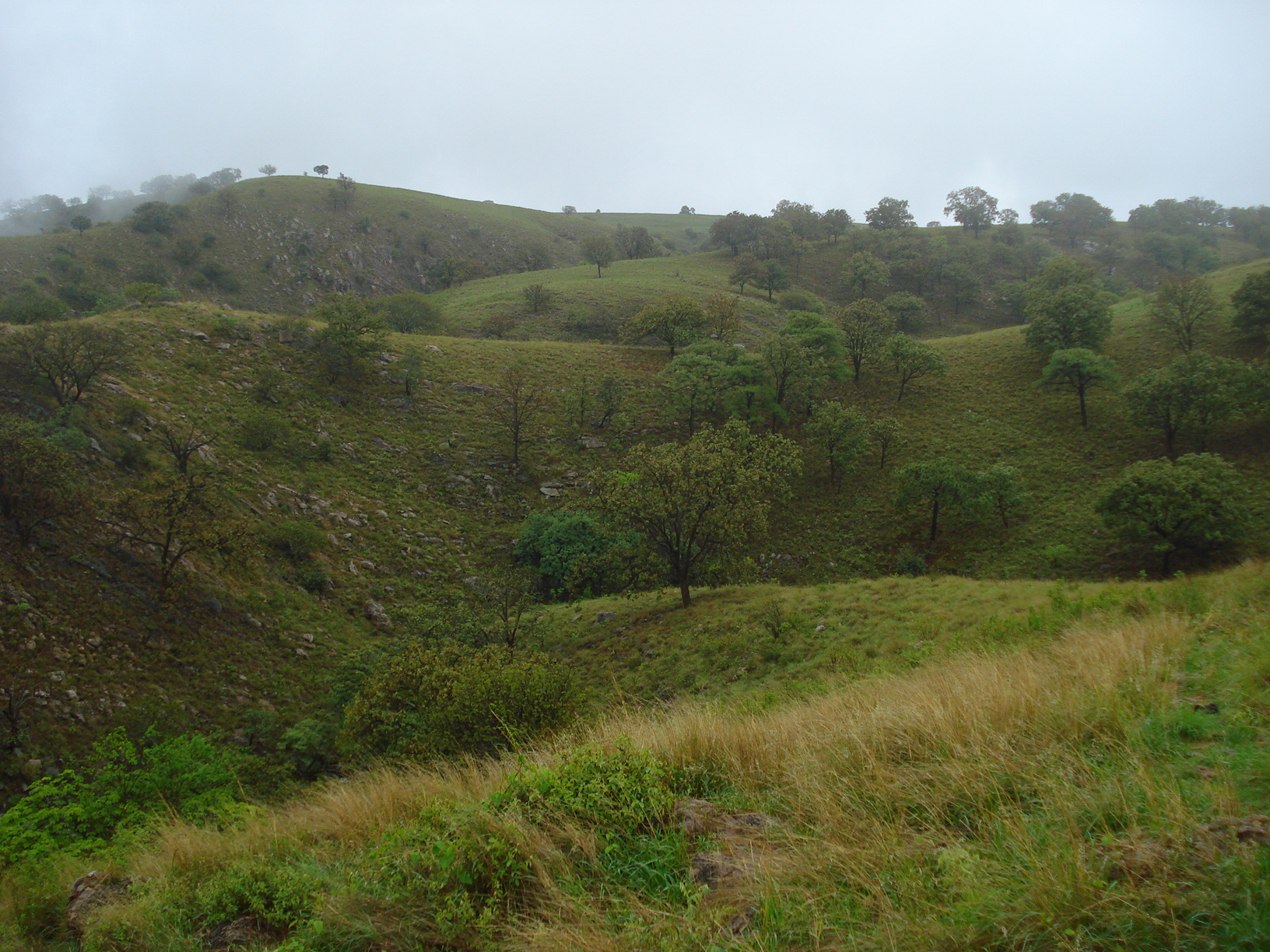
Landscape near the city

The Canyon is considered a biogeographic corridor since it is home to several types of vegetation: Tropical Forest, Deciduous, Riparian forest vegetation and secondary vegetation. Several species of flora and fauna are endemic to the canyon. It is often visited by national and international investigators since it includes great biological diversity.

On June 5, 1997 the canyon was declared a Nature reserve, under the category of Zone subject to Ecological Conservation Protected Area by the World Conservation Union of all the area belonging to the Guadalajara Metropolitan Area because it is the most urbanized area. Great Horned Owls, Collared Peccaries, Bobcats, Gray Foxes, Opossums, Red-tailed Boas, Barn Owls, Leaf Cutter Ants and Vampire Bats are among the species making a home in the canyon.

The Guadalajara metropolitan area extends towards the Eastern side of the canyon and subsequently many buildings are near or overlook the canyon, complexes such as the University of Guadalajara campus of the CUAAD Center of Art, Architecture and Design, the Guadalajara Zoo, and the now closed Guadalajara Planetarium. In addition to several residential areas, there are also sporting and recreational facilities that include soccer fields, basketball, tennis and fronton courts, picnic spaces, a running strip, a recreational park and an outdoor theater. The canyon is also a popular destination for hiking.

There were plans to build the next Guggenheim Museum in early 2008, the controversial Arcediano dam project and a high-rise project called Puerta Guadalajara (Guadalajara Gate) which would have included a shopping mall, a convention center, two hotels, two museums, nine residential towers and two more corporate towers. None of these projects were started and it seems likely that they have now all been cancelled or postponed indefinitely. However, work is in progress on the construction of an art museum in the Mirador park, on the site formerly intended for the Guggenheim museum project.
