= Tracy Bale =

American neuroscientist and molecular biologist

- Education: Washington State University (B.S.); University of Washington (Ph.D.)
- Known for: Epigenetics, Prenatal stress
- Scientific career
- Fields: Neuroscience
- Workplaces: University of Maryland, University of Pennsylvania, Salk Institute
- Doctoral advisor: Daniel Dorsa
- Other academic advisors: Wylie Vale

Tracy L. Bale is an American neuroscientist and molecular biologist. She is the Anschutz Foundation Endowed Chair in Women’s Integrated Mental and Physical Health Research at the Ludeman Center, Director of InterGenerational Stress and Health, and Director of Sex Differences Research in the Department of Psychiatry at the University of Colorado, Anschutz Medical Campus in Aurora, Colorado. Her research centers on the role of parental, prenatal, and early life stress on the developing brain and subsequent behavior throughout the lifespan. She is also the current President of the International Brain Research Organization.

== Early life and education ==
Tracy Bale received her B.S. from Washington State University in molecular biology and genetics in 1992. She then began her doctoral studies in Neurobiology at the University of Washington, studying under Daniel Dorsa in the Department of Pharmacology. She received her Ph.D. in 1997. She then became a postdoctoral fellow at the Salk Institute, where she focused her research on stress neuroendocrinology under the supervision of Wylie Vale. They published a highly cited review article summarizing the relationship between corticotropin-releasing factor (CRF) and stress responses.

== Career and research ==
Bale joined the faculty at the University of Pennsylvania in 2003. She was the co-director of the Penn Center for the Study of Sex and Gender in Behavioral Health, Director of Research for the BIRCWH Faculty Scholars, and Director of the Neuroscience Center at the School of Veterinary Medicine. Her work included findings on sex differences in neurodevelopment in response to stress. Bale also contributed research findings that demonstrated how and why dieting might make people more susceptible to stress, highlighted in Science.

In 2017, she moved her lab to the University of Maryland School of Medicine, where she was a Professor of Pharmacology and Director of the Center for Epigenetic Research in Child Health and Brain Development.

In 2022, Bale moved to the University of Colorado School of Medicine. She was recruited to be the Anschutz Foundation Endowed Chair of Women’s Integrated Mental and Physical Health Research at the Ludeman Center, Director of InterGenerational Stress and Health, and Director of the Department of Psychiatry program in Sex Differences Research. She directs the Laboratory of Translational Psychiatry with Scott Thompson.

Her recent work focuses on understanding the mechanisms by which stress and trauma impact brain development and function across the lifespan and may be passed to offspring (see developmental origins of health and disease). Her research examines the cellular processes involved in stress signals and allostasis, including mitochondrial and nuclear transcriptional regulation, chromatin modifications, and secreted factors, such as extracellular vesicles. She has established causal connections between parental stress and reproductive outcomes, gestational development, and offspring health in animal models. For example, when female mice (mothers) experience stress while their offspring are in utero, their offspring tend to be more sensitive to stress themselves. Her findings were based on mouse models and have since been replicated in humans. In male mice and humans, her team showed that chronic stress creates a lasting change in sperm via extracellular vesicles, providing a mechanism for how stress is “programmed” into germline cells.

Her studies and commentary on germline cells have been widely covered by major outlets including Scientific American and The New York Times.

== Awards and honors ==
- National Science Foundation Young Investigator Award (1997)
- American Neuroendocrine Society Fellowship (2001)
- Frank Beach Award, Society for Behavioral Neuroendocrinology (2003)
- McCabe Fellow Award (2003)
- Ziskind-Somerfeld Award, Society for Biological Psychiatry (2008)
- Career Development Award, Society for Neuroscience (2008)
- Richard E. Weitzman Award, Endocrine Society (2011)
- Medtronic Award, Society for Women's Health Research (2012)
- Daniel H. Efron Award, American College of Neuropsychopharmacology (2016)
- Maryland Top 100 Women (2021)
- Member of the National Academy of Medicine (2024)
