= Lerma chub =

Conservation status
- Critically Endangered (IUCN 3.1)

Scientific classification
- Kingdom: Animalia
- Phylum: Chordata
- Class: Actinopterygii
- Order: Cypriniformes
- Family: Leuciscidae
- Subfamily: Pogonichthyinae
- Genus: Algansea
- Species: A. barbata

Binomial name
- Algansea barbata Álvarez & Cortés, 1964

Species of fish

The Lerma chub (Algansea barbata) is a species of freshwater fish in the family Leuciscidae, the shiners, daces and minnows. It is endemic to the uppermost Lerma River basin in the State of Mexico and Toluca Valley of central Mexico. This threatened species is up to about 13 cm (5.1 in) long.
