= Juchipila River =

Location
- Country: Mexico

Physical characteristics
- Mouth: Río Grande de Santiago
  - location: San Cristóbal de la Barranca

Basin features
- Tributaries
  - left: Calvillo River

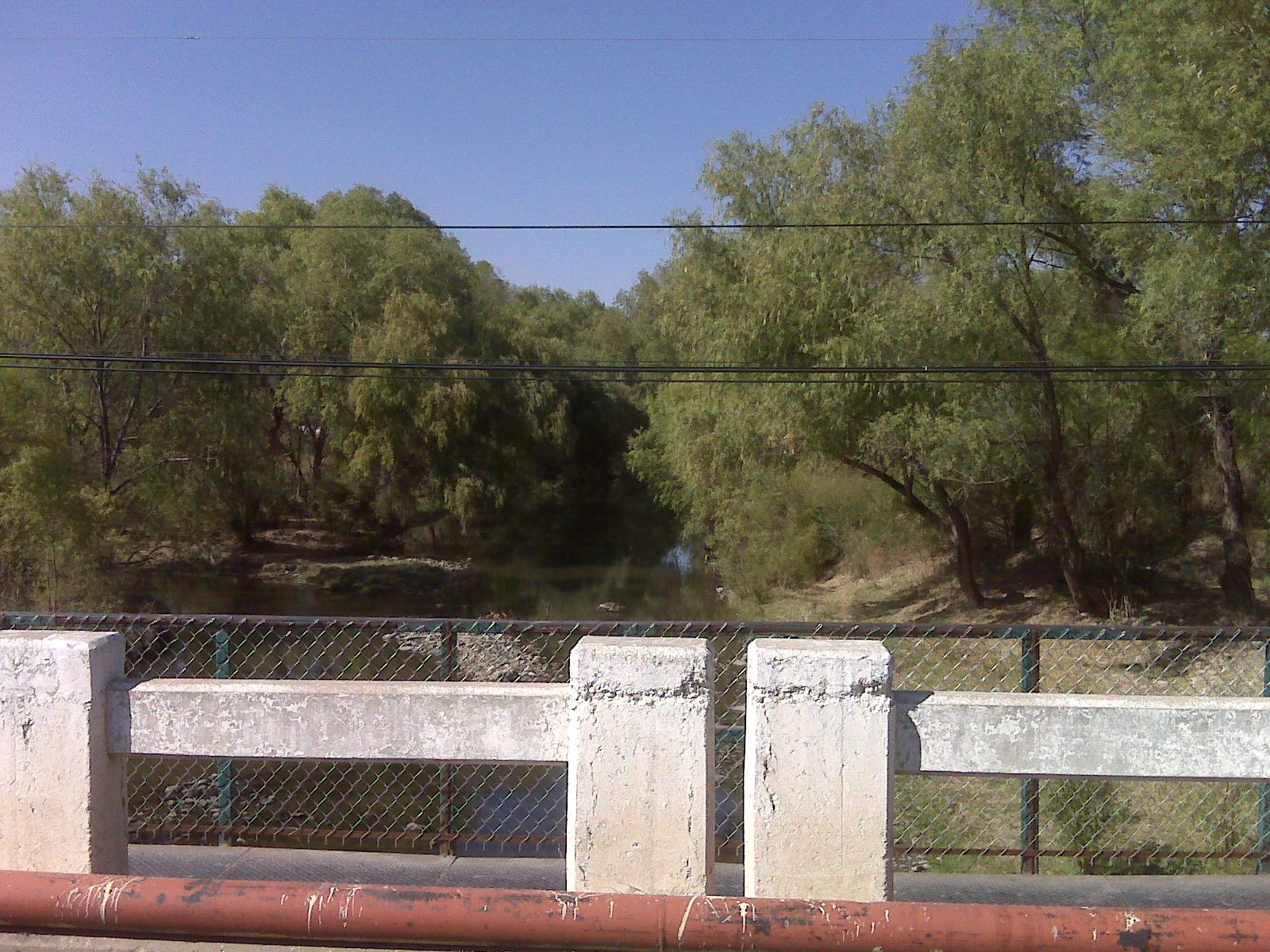

The Juchipila River is a river of Mexico. It is a tributary of the Río Grande de Santiago.

== See also ==
- List of rivers of Mexico
