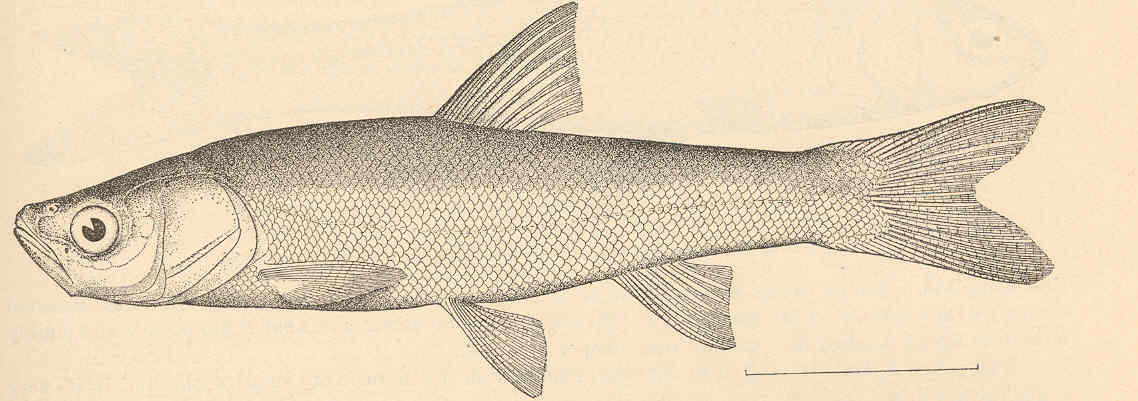

Conservation status
- Endangered (IUCN 3.1)

Scientific classification
- Kingdom: Animalia
- Phylum: Chordata
- Class: Actinopterygii
- Order: Cypriniformes
- Family: Leuciscidae
- Subfamily: Pogonichthyinae
- Genus: Algansea
- Species: A. popoche

Binomial name
- Algansea popoche (D. S. Jordan & Snyder, 1899)

Synonyms
- Xystrosus popoche Jordan & Snyder, 1899

= Popoche chub =

Species of fish

The popoche chub (Algansea popoche) is a species of freshwater fish in the family Leuciscidae, the shiners, daces and minnows. It is endemic to the Lake Chapala and nearby sections of associated rivers in Jalisco of west-central Mexico. This is a relatively large omnivorous species of Algansea at up to 23 cm (9.1 in) long. Although considered threatened, it can be locally numerous. It is generally not considered a food fish.
