= Algansea amecae =

Conservation status
- Endangered (IUCN 3.1)

Scientific classification
- Kingdom: Animalia
- Phylum: Chordata
- Class: Actinopterygii
- Order: Cypriniformes
- Family: Leuciscidae
- Subfamily: Pogonichthyinae
- Genus: Algansea
- Species: A. amecae

Binomial name
- Algansea amecae Pérez-Rodríguez, Pérez-Ponce de León, Domínguez-Domínguez & Doadrio, 2009

Species of fish

Algansea amecae, the Ameca chub, is a species of freshwater fish in the family Leuciscidae, the shiners, daces and minnows. It is endemic to the upper Ameca River basin in Jalisco, western Mexico. It grows to about 10 cm (4 in) in standard length.
