= Juan Lerma Gómez =

Spanish neuroscientist and research professor

- Born: June 8, 1955 (age 70)

Academic work
- Discipline: Neuroscience, physiology

Juan Lerma Gómez (born June 8, 1955, Ciudad Real, Spain) is a spanish neuroscientist and Research Professor at the Institute of Neurociences in Alicante.

== Biography ==
Lerma studied biology at the Complutense University of Madrid, and in 1979 started research at the Hospital Ramón y Cajal, under the mentorship of Elio Garcia-Austt, obtaining his PhD in sciences at the Autonomous University of Madrid in 1983. After six years as a faculty member at the hospital's Department of Research, he became a tenured staff researcher in the Instituto Cajal supported by the Consejo Superior de Investigaciones Científicas. In 1987, he moved to the Albert Einstein College of Medicine as a Fogarty Fellow, working with Mike V. L. Bennett and R. Suzanne Zukin. In 1990, he returned to Spain at the Instituto Cajal where he established his own lab. In 2000, he was promoted to full professor (CSIC). In 2004, he moved to the Institute of Neurosciences in Alicante where he became Vice-director (2005-2007), Director (2007-2016) and Scientific Director of the programme "Severo Ochoa Center of Excellence" (2014-2022).

== Research ==
Lerma has focused his research on the molecular basis of neuronal communication, specifically on elucidating the properties and signaling mechanisms of glutamate receptors and its role in health and disease.

He described the existence of functional kainate receptors (KARs) in central neurons and applied single-cell RT-PCR to study neurotransmitter receptors. He described the KAR's fundamental role in controlling neuronal tissue excitability and epileptogenesis, demonstrating that KARs have a dual mechanism of signaling. Nowadays he studies the role played by KARs at particular synapses and in the pathophysiology of brain diseases, in particular those related to mood disorders.

== Publications ==
Lerma has published over 100 papers in peer-reviewed scientific journals. ORCID Scholar

== Professional service ==
He is currently a research professor at the Consejo Superior de Investigaciones Científicas (CSIC), Vice President of the European Brain Council (EBC) (2022-2024), Councilor of the Society for Neuroscience (SfN) (USA) (2023-2024) and appointed Member (medal 39) of the Royal Academy of Sciences of Spain (2024). He has been president of the Pan-European Regional Committee of International Brain Research Organization (IBRO) (2010-2015), president of the Spanish Society of Neuroscience (2011-2013) and member of the executive board of the Confederation of Scientific Societies of Spain (COSCE) (2013-2016), general secretary of the Federation of European Neuroscience Societies (FENS) (2016-2018) and member of the Board of the European Brain Council (EBC) (2014-2018). He was elected member of the European Molecular Biology Organization (EMBO)2 in 2000 and of the Academia Europaea3 in 2010.

He was editor-in-chief of Neuroscience (journal) (2016-2023), the flagship journal of the International Brain Research Organization (IBRO), and a member of the editorial board of Neuron, Neuroscience, Frontiers in Neuroscience, Neuroscience Bulletin, and Physiological Reviews.

== Honors and awards ==
- Member (medal 39) of the Royal Academy of Sciences of Spain (2024)
- Gold Medal from the Institute of Neurosciences (2016)
- Scientific Merit Award by Generalitat Valenciana (2013)
- Maximum Distinction for Research Career by National University of San Marcos, Perú (2010)
- Elected member of the Academia Europaea (2010)
- XI "Alberto Sols" Award (Best Research Career) (2006)
- Member of European Dana Alliance for the Brain (EDAB) (2005)
- XVIII Award CEOE Foundation to Sciences (2004)
- Alonso Gabriel de Herrera Excellence Award (2002)
- Santiago Grisolía Award (2002)
- Elected member of the European Molecular Biology Organization] (2000)
- Distinction of the Health Sciences Foundation in Neurobiology (1998)
