= San Marcos, Jalisco =

San Marcos
- Municipality and town
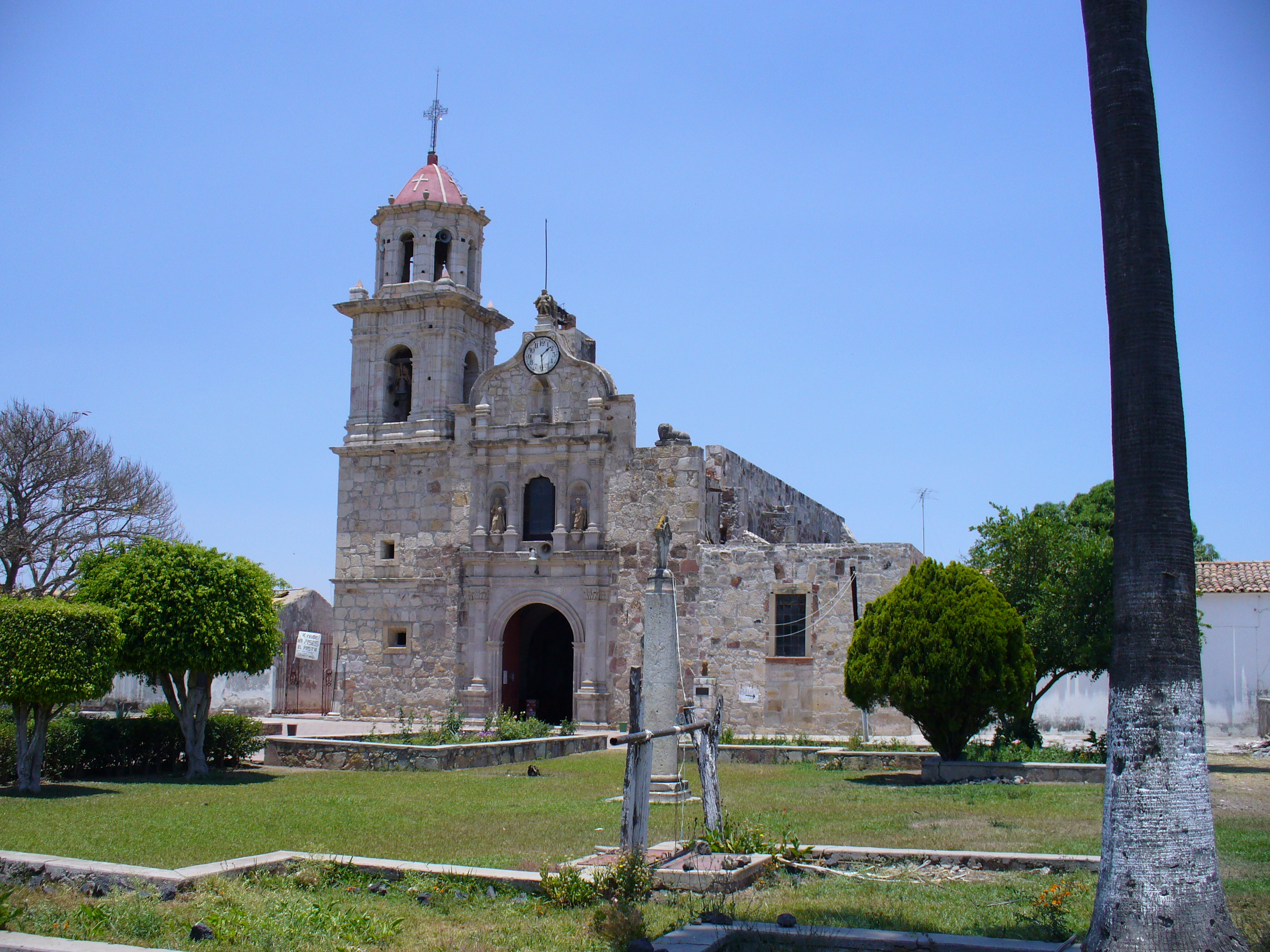
- Iglesia de San Marcos.

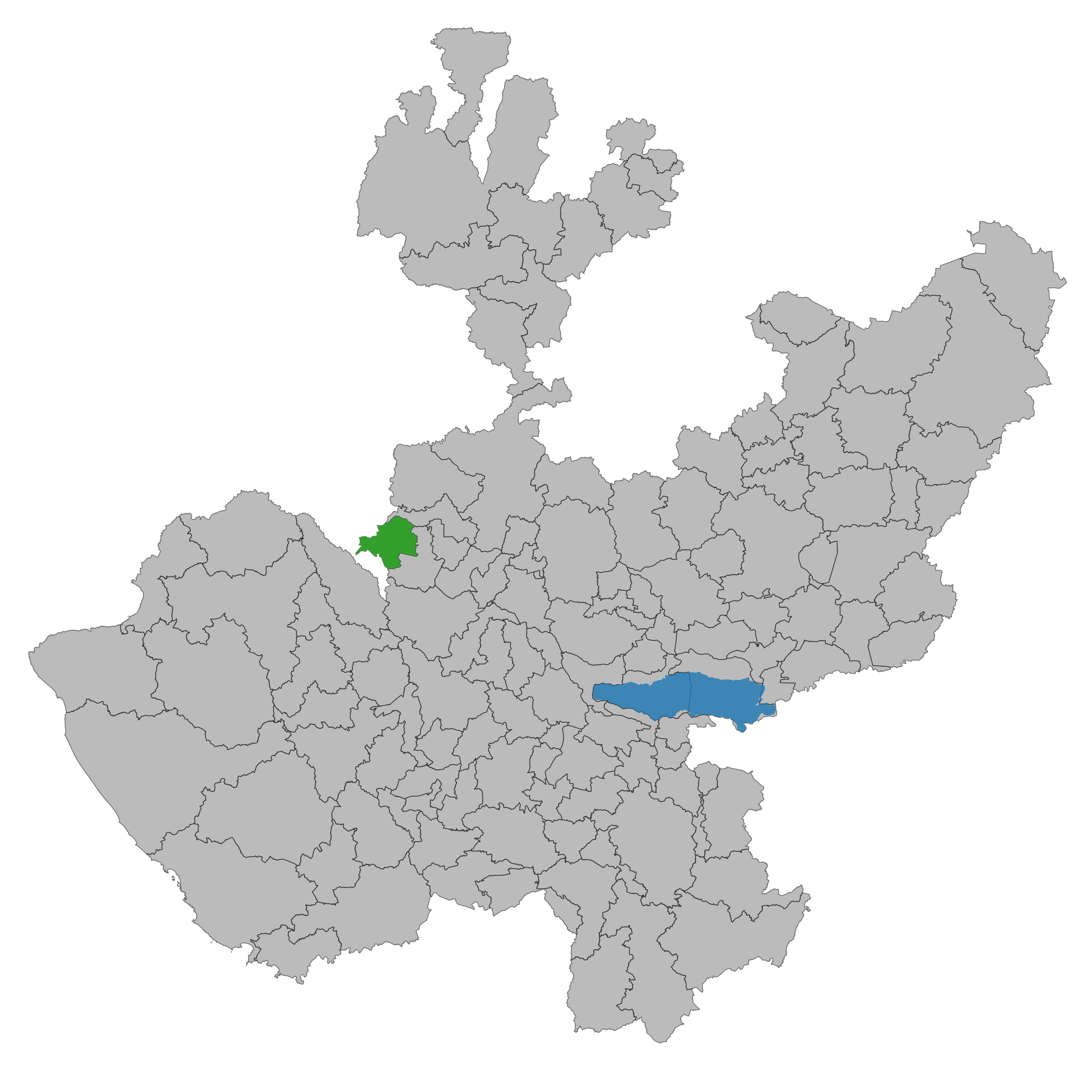
- Location of the municipality in Jalisco

- Location in Mexico
- Coordinates: 20°47′N 104°11′W
- Country: Mexico
- State: Jalisco

Area
  - Total: 305.5 km^{2} (118.0 sq mi)
  - Town: 1.83 km^{2} (0.71 sq mi)

Population (2020 census)
  - Total: 3,791
  - Density: 12.41/km^{2} (32.14/sq mi)
  - Town: 3,478
  - Town density: 1,900/km^{2} (4,920/sq mi)
- Time zone: UTC-6 (Central Standard Time)

San Marcos is a town and municipality, in Jalisco in central-western Mexico. The municipality covers an area of 305.5 km^{2}.

As of 2005, the municipality had a total population of 3,533.

== History ==
The area now incorporating the settlement of San Marcos was originally called Chistic or Xistic and was originally inhabited by the Toltec tribe under the rule of the Tonallan kings. Francisco Cortés de San Buenaventura arrived followed in 1530 by Nuño de Guzman, and Juan de Escárcena. In 1542 San Marcos was visited by the Viceroy D. Antonio de Mendoza on his way to put down a large indigenous rebellion.

The town itself was founded on June 28, 1740, by Fray Antonio de Jesus who was instrumental in construction of the church. As late as 1825 the town had no city hall and was subordinate to Etzatlán Township. The city was officially founded by decree on April 17, 1907, which became effective the following April.

In the early 1900s, during the rule of Mexican dictator Porfirio Diaz, the Mexican government forcibly marched thousands of Yaquis some 200 miles over the mountains from San Blas to San Marcos and its train station. There, the Yaqui survivors were sold at sixty pesos a head to the owners of sugar cane plantations in Oaxaca and the tobacco planters of the Valle Nacional, while thousands more were sold to the henequen plantation owners of the Yucatán. By 1908, at least five thousand Yaqui had been sold into forced slavery. Most died within the first year of their captivity.

== Government ==
=== Municipal presidents ===
| Municipal presidents | Term | Political party | Notes |
|---|---|---|---|
| Roberto Aguilar | 1915 | | |
| Eusebio Villarreal | 1916 | | |
| Benito Flores Gallardo | 1917 | | |
| Ricardo Vázquez Paredes | 1918 | | |
| Roberto Aguilar | 1919 | | |
| Daniel Amézquita | 1920 | | |
| Miguel Ballesteros | 1921–1922 | | |
| Alberto Rodríguez | 1925–1926 | | |
| Moisés Paredes | 1927–1928 | | |
| Miguel Paredes | 1929 | PNR | |
| Manuel Paredes | 1930 | PNR | |
| Pablo Leal | 1931–1932 | PNR | |
| José Ramón Topete | 1933 | PNR | |
| Melesio F. Aguilera | 1934 | PNR | |
| Juan Rivera Castillo | 1935 | PNR | |
| Daniel Amézquita | 1936 | PNR | |
| Lucio Venegas Velázquez | 1937 | PNR | |
| Lucio Venegas Navarro | 1938 | PRM | |
| Ramón Venegas Velázquez | 1939 | PRM | |
| Francisco Venegas Velázquez | 1940–1942 | PRM | |
| Fernando Ocegueda | 1943 | PRM | |
| Esteban Flores Baro | 1944 | PRM | |
| José Amaral Solano | 1945–1946 | PRM | |
| Carlos Cortés | 1947–1948 | PRI | |
| Ramón Fonseca Reyes | 1949–1950 | PRI | |
| Heriberto Paredes Villarreal | 1951–1952 | PRI | |
| José R. Zambrano Ceceña | 01-01-1953–31-12-1955 | PRI | |
| Hilario Paredes de León | 1956 | PRI | |
| Arnulfo Romero Loza | 01-01-1959–31-12-1961 | PRI | |
| Salvador Hernández Mata | 01-01-1962–31-12-1964 | PRI | |
| Lorenzo Villarreal Monroy | 01-01-1965–31-12-1967 | PRI | |
| J. Jesús Parra Flores | 01-01-1968–31-12-1970 | PRI | |
| Manuel Gallardo López | 01-01-1971–31-12-1973 | PRI | |
| José González Camarena | 01-01-1974–1975 | PRI | |
| Eva Amézquita Martínez del Campo | 1975–31-12-1976 | PRI | |
| Lorenzo Villarreal Monroy | 01-01-1977–31-12-1979 | PRI | |
| Alejandro Díaz Hernández | 01-01-1980–31-12-1982 | PRI | |
| Carlos Uribe Cisco | 01-01-1983–31-12-1985 | PRI | |
| Alfredo Amézquita Díaz | 01-01-1986–31-12-1988 | PRI | |
| Baltazar Curiel García | 1989–1992 | PRI | |
| Roberto Mariscal Márquez | 1992–1995 | PRI | |
| Baltazar Curiel García | 1995–1997 | PRI | |
| Daniel Martín González Bernal | 01-01-1998–31-12-2000 | PRD | |
| Plácido Villarreal Villanueva | 01-01-2001–31-12-2003 | PRD | |
| Baltazar Curiel García | 01-01-2004–31-12-2006 | PRI | |
| Eduardo Alejandro Díaz Paredes | 01-01-2007–31-12-2009 | PRI | |
| Ramiro Amézquita Díaz | 01-01-2010–30-09-2012 | PAN | |
| Eduardo Alejandro Díaz Paredes | 01-10-2012–30-09-2015 | PRI; PVEM | Coalition "Compromise for Jalisco" |
| Baltazar Curiel García | 01-10-2015–30-09-2018 | PRI | |
| David Sánchez Domínguez | 01-10-2018–30-09-2021 | PAN; PRD; MC | |
| Martha Patricia Reyes Ruiz | 01-10-2021– | MC | |
