= Río Grande de Santiago =

River in Mexico

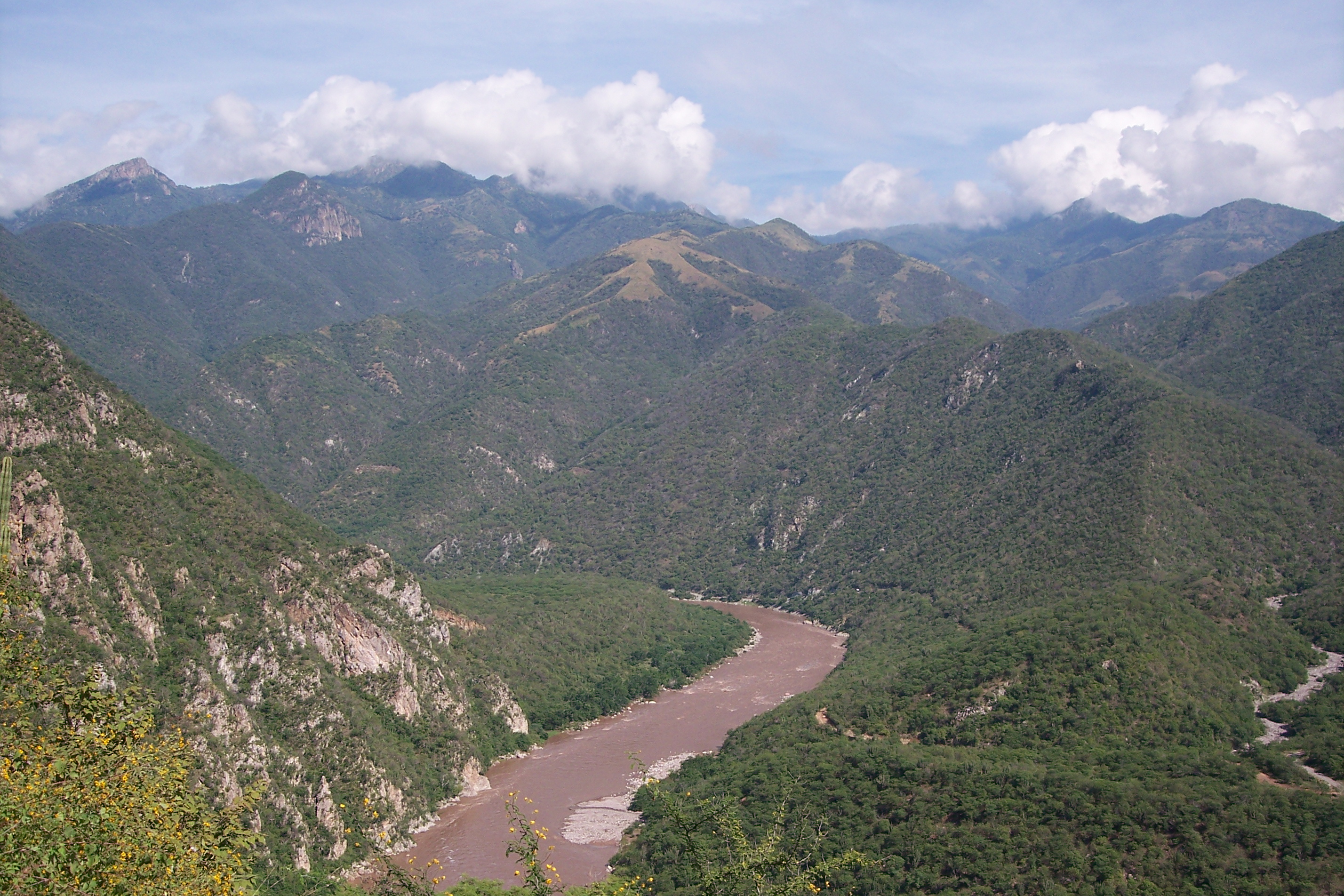
- Río Grande de Santiago at the Nayarit–Jalisco border

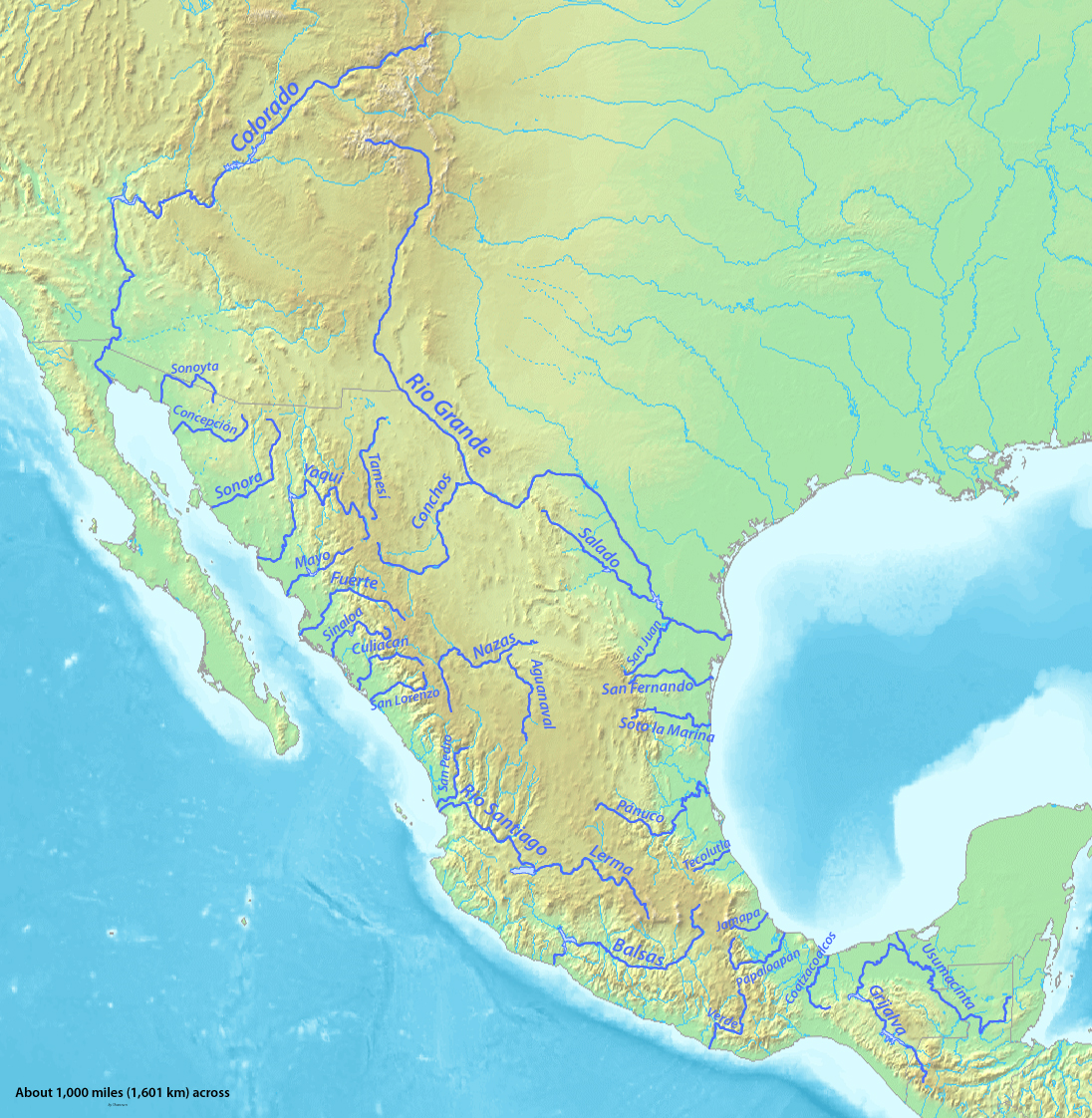
- Major rivers of Mexico, with the Rio Grande de Santiago (labelled Rio Santiago) in west–center

- Location of mouth

Location
- Country: Mexico

Physical characteristics
- Source
  - location: Lake Chapala via Ocotlán
- Mouth
  - location: Pacific Ocean at San Blas / Santiago Ixcuintla, Nayarit
  - coordinates: 21°37′41″N 105°26′52″W
- Length: 433 km (269 mi)
- Basin size: 136,628 square kilometres (52,752 mi^{2})
- Discharge
  - average: Average: 320 cubic metres per second (11,000 cu ft/s); Maximum: 2,113 cubic metres per second (74,600 cu ft/s); Minimum: 29.5 cubic metres per second (1,040 cu ft/s)

Basin features
- Tributaries
  - left: Mololoa River
  - right: Río Verde, Juchipila River, Bolaños River, Huaynamota River

The Río Grande de Santiago, or Santiago River, is a river in western Mexico. It flows westwards from Lake Chapala via Ocotlán through the states of Jalisco and Nayarit to empty into the Pacific Ocean. It is one of the longest rivers in Mexico, measuring up 433 km (269 mi) long.

== Geography ==
The river begins at Lake Chapala, running through Ocotlán and continuing roughly north-west through the Sierra Madre Occidental range, receiving the Verde, Juchipila, Bolaños, Huaynamota, Mololoa, and other tributaries.

The Río Grande de Santiago then descends over 1700 meters as it heads towards the sea. Downstream from Lake Chapala, the river and its major tributaries have carved deep narrow canyons, or barrancas, which can be 600 meters lower than the surrounding plateau. The lower elevation and year-round moisture in the canyon bottoms sustain forests, which include many coastal tropical species not found on the plateaus. The Barranca de Oblatos or Barranca de Huentitán is a scenic and protected area popular with residents of the city of Guadalajara, which lies on the plateau immediately south of the barranca.

At La Yesca, the La Yesca Dam was completed in 2012 and the El Cajón Dam was completed downstream in 2007. Below El Cajón, the Aguamilpa Dam was completed in 1993, creating a reservoir covering a large part of the territory of the municipality of El Nayar in Nayarit.

From Aguamilpa, the river descends to the coastal lowlands, passing by Santiago Ixcuintla and empties into the Pacific Ocean, 16 km (10 mi) northwest of San Blas, in Nayarit.

The Santiago River alone is reported to be 269 miles long. It is viewed by some sources as a continuation of the Lerma River, which flows into Lake Chapala and at 466 miles long is one of Mexico's longest rivers. Together the Lerma–Santiago river system is a little over 600 miles long.

== Fauna ==
The remote chub (Algansea avia), mountain chub (Algansea monticola), and Chapala catfish (Ictalurus ochoterenai) are endemic to the Río Grande de Santiago and its tributaries.

== Pollution ==
Mexico possesses a very small percentage (0.1%) of the world's freshwater reserves. According to an article named Water use (and abuse) and its effects on the crater-lakes of Valle de Santiago, Mexico "most Mexican lakes are in an advanced state of desiccation or senescence, with volume and surface area greatly reduced because of human activities". Some examples of these damaging activities are wood cutting, inflow diversion for agriculture, groundwater over extraction, pollution and eutrophication.

Less than fifty years ago, the river was a place to fish, bathe, and swim. It is now a river full of pollutants. The Instituto Mexicano de Tecnología del Agua (IMTA) found over a thousand different chemicals in the main channel and its tributaries. These substances included semi-volatile and volatile organic compounds, such as phthalates (hormonal disruptors), phenols (compounds that affect neuronal development), toluene (a neurotoxin), and carcinogenic flame retardants. This river is one of the most polluted in Mexico.

On 13 February 2008, an eight-year-old boy, Miguel Ángel López Rocha, died after he fell into the river. Rocha fell near the El Salto Falls. He died nineteen days later. His autopsy indicated heavy metal poison was the reason for his death. This brought attention to the severe contamination of the river. After this unfortunate incident the local community organized a group called "Un Salto de Vida" ("A Leap for Life"), which sponsored the second National Assembly on Environmental Impacts held in El Salto in May 2009.

== See also ==
- List of longest rivers of Mexico
- List of most-polluted rivers
