= Armería River =

River in Jalisco and Colima, Mexico

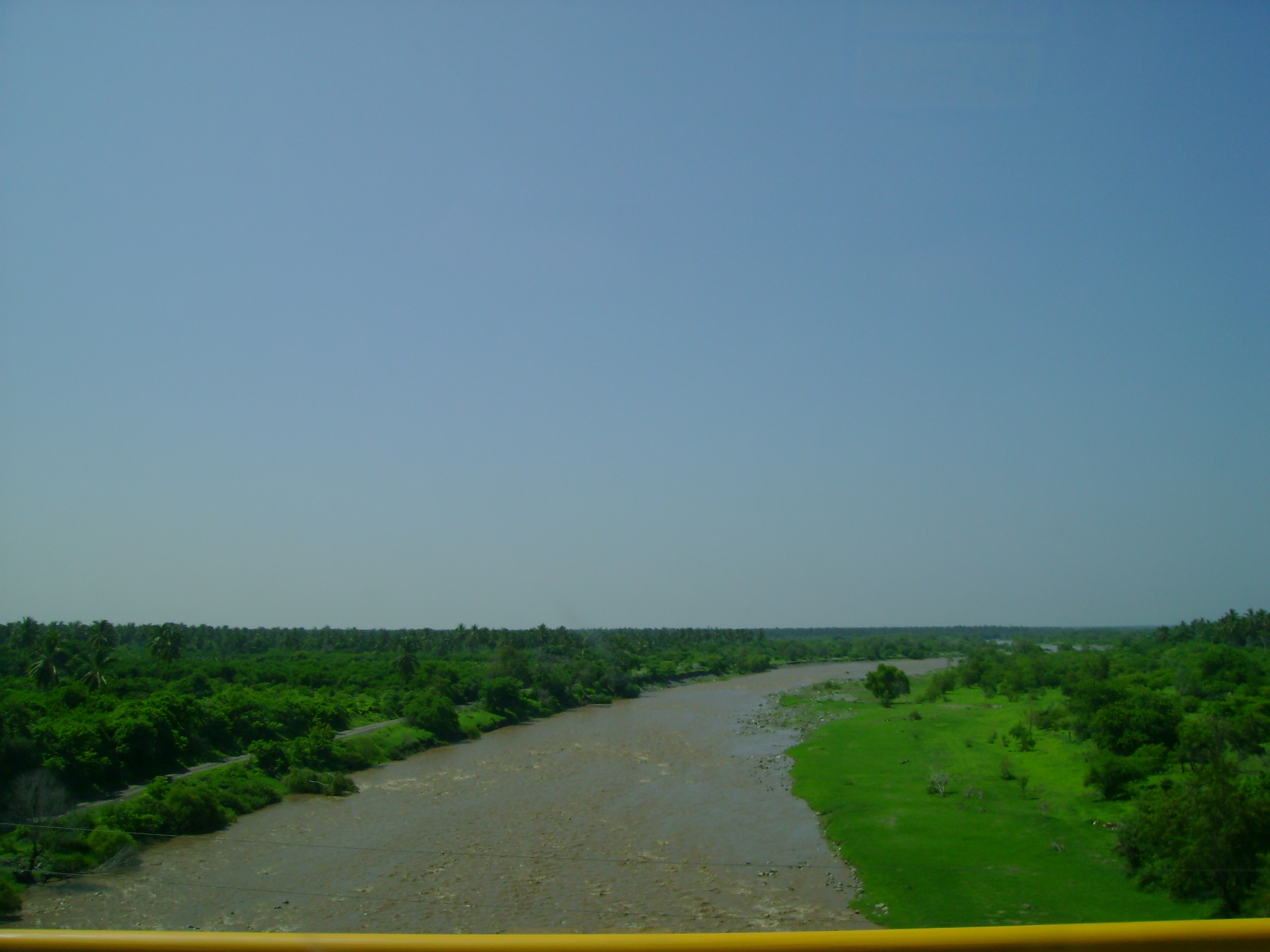

- Location of mouth

Location
- Country: Mexico
- State: Colima and Jalisco

Physical characteristics
- Mouth
  - location: Pacific Ocean
  - coordinates: 18°52′55″N 103°57′07″W
  - elevation: Sea level

The Armería River is a river in western Mexico. It originates in central Jalisco, and flows southward through Jalisco and Colima and there empties into the Pacific Ocean.

== On the river ==
The Armería River begins in the state of Jalisco and flows south until it enters the state of Colima, which crosses its central part. Its main tributaries are the Comala River, the Colima River, and the Ayuquila River. It is the main source of water supply in the region and is the largest, widest and most caudal river in the state of Colima.

In 1922 the distribution of agricultural land and the construction of various irrigation canals such as Periquillos, La Cañita, Independencia and Cuyutlán led to an economic boom in the towns surrounding the river.

== See also ==
- List of rivers of Mexico
- List of rivers of the Americas by coastline
