= Tuxpan River (Jalisco) =

River in Jalisco

- Location of mouth

Location
- Country: Mexico
- States: Jalisco, Colima, and Michoacán

Physical characteristics
- Mouth
  - coordinates: 19°15′48″N 103°30′25″W

The Tuxpan River, also known as the Coahuayana River, is a river of Mexico. It originates in the Trans-Mexican Volcanic Belt south of Lake Chapala. It flows southwards through Tuxpan Municipality, Jalisco, and then forms the eastern border of Colima with Michoacán before emptying into the Pacific Ocean.

== See also ==
- List of rivers of Mexico
