= Lerma River =

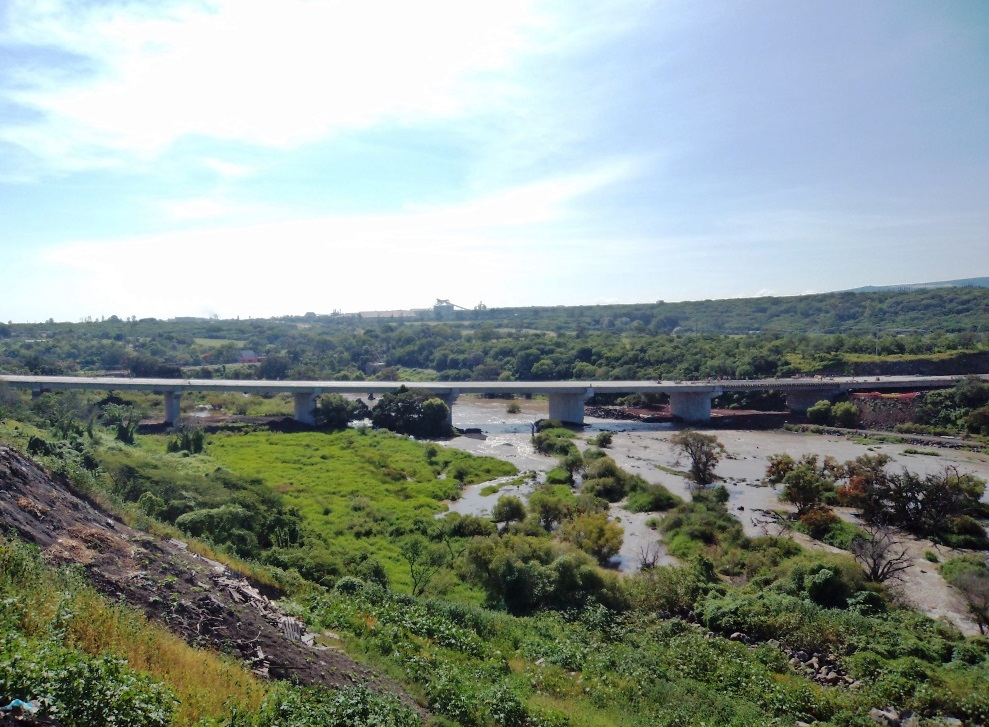
- Bridge over the Lerma River

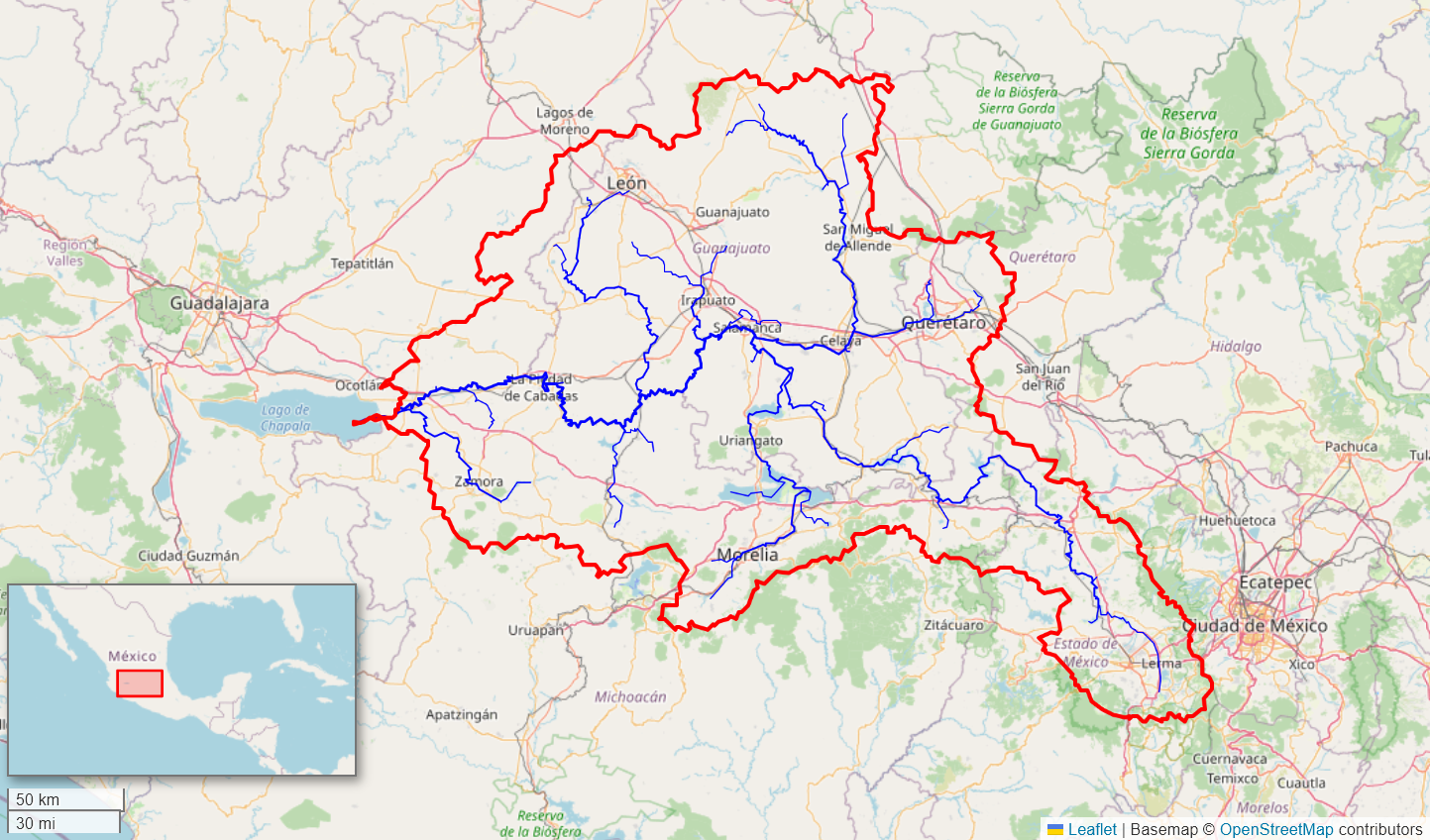
- Map of the Lerma River watershed in Mexico

Location
- Country: Mexico

Physical characteristics
- Source
  - location: lagoons near Santa Cruz Atizapán, Mexican Plateau
  - coordinates: 19°09′43″N 99°30′05″W
- Mouth
  - location: Lake Chapala (→Río Grande de Santiago→Pacific Ocean)
  - coordinates: 20°13′N 102°46′W
- Length: 750 km (466 mi), without Río Grande de Santiago

The Lerma River (Spanish: Río Lerma) is Mexico's seventh longest river.

It is a 750 km-long (470 mi) river in west-central Mexico that begins in Mexican Plateau at an altitude over 3,000 metres (9,843 ft) above sea level, and ends where it empties into Lake Chapala, Mexico's largest lake, near Guadalajara, Jalisco. Lake Chapala is also the starting point of Río Grande de Santiago, which some treat as a continuation of the Lerma River. In combination, the two are often called the Lerma Santiago River (Spanish: Río Lerma Santiago).

The Lerma River is notorious for its pollution, but the water quality has demonstrated considerable improvement in recent years due mostly to government environmental programs and through a vast program of upgrading local sanitation infrastructure.

== Course ==
The Lerma River originates from the Lerma lagoons near Santa Cruz Atizapán, on a plateau more than 2,600 metres (8,500 ft) above sea level, and 24 kilometres (15 mi) southeast from the city of Toluca. The lagoons receive their water from springs rising from basaltic volcanics that flow down from Monte de Las Cruces. These are located between the Valley of Toluca and the Basin of Mexico.

The river forms the short border between the states of Querétaro and Michoacán then flows west-northwest through the state of Guanajuato. After turning southward, the river separates Guanajuato and Michoacán, and Michoacán and Jalisco before flowing, after a course of about 560 kilometres (350 mi), into Lake Chapala, 24 kilometres (15 mi) west-southwest of La Barca. It has a length of 750 kilometres (470 mi). When it empties into Lake Chapala, the system stands at 1,510 metres (4,950 ft) above sea level.

Some people consider the 400-kilometre (249 mi) long Río Grande de Santiago, which continues from Lake Chapala northwest towards the Pacific Ocean, to be a continuation of the Lerma River.

== Importance in Mexico ==
During the 17th and 18th centuries, large haciendas were established along this river, including the Atenco Ranch, which was founded with bulls that belonged to Hernán Cortés. The bulls from this area are considered some of the finest stock for bullfighting. The river is dotted with cities such as Lerma and San Mateo Atenco to small picturesque villages with cultural significance such as Malinalco.

The Lerma River–Lake Chapala basin is considered to be the most important watershed in the country by the federal government. With its major tributaries, the Laja, Apaseo, and Turbio the Lerma constitutes Mexico's largest river system. The Lerma River is not navigable by water craft, but it is critical to regional agricultural irrigation. In the Lerma River/Lake Chapala watershed, 52,125 of the total 78,000 (roughly 67%) farmers are classified as small farmers. Currently 820,000 hectares are irrigated and an estimated three million hectares are in agricultural production.

The population in the watershed as of 1997 was 9.35 million with an annual growth rate slightly less than the national average. The population is distributed among 6,224 localities; 18 of these have a population greater than 50,000 inhabitants. The rural population is currently 32 per cent. The Lerma's water is also a source for the municipal water supply in the Guadalajara and Toluca metropolitan areas. While water extraction and use has been adequate for the region's larger population centers, rural areas have had chronic problems with access to potable water from the river and the aquifers that feed it. Wells drilled into these aquifers have very low yields.

== Ecology ==
The Lerma–Chapala–Grande de Santiago basin and associated systems are rich in freshwater fish, being the home of more than 100 native species and 19 introduced species. Among the natives, the two most diverse families are the splitfins and Neotropical silversides (each has about 1/4 of the native species in the basin), followed by the poeciliids and cyprinids (each has about 1/8 of the native species in the basin). Among these are many endemics, including several Chirostoma ("charales") silversides, several splitfins, a few Poeciliopsis livebearers, a few Algansea chubs, two Yuriria chubs, a few Notropis shiners, two Ictalurus catfish, two Tetrapleurodon lampreys, and more. Many of these are threatened, and a few Chirostoma silversides and all three Evarra chubs are already extinct.

The Lerma–Chapala–Grande de Santiago basin and associated systems have four endemic cambarid crayfish: Cambarellus chapalanus, C. lermensis, C. prolixus and Procambarus digueti.

== Pollution ==
The Lerma River has had chronic problems with pollution. Most of the problems are due to untreated and under-treated wastewater being discharged into the river. Reservoirs constructed to control the highly varied flow of the river are often choked with water hyacinths due to eutrophication caused by the untreated effluents. The most important industries in the Lerma River area are those that produce meat, dairy, produce, beverages, pulp and paper, leather goods, petrochemical and chemical products. Little or no emphasis on wastewater treatment and recycling has been imposed upon these economic activities.

The situation became extremely bad in the late 1980s because of uncoordinated water policies that did little or nothing to regulate water use among competing interests and failed to consider the effects of upstream activities to those living downstream. Government plans were drawn up due to intense public pressure leading to improvement of the water quality in the 1990s. By 1997, 45 plants with a treatment capacity of 5.72 cubic metres per second (202 cu ft/s) were operating on a regular basis with an average running efficiency of about 70 per cent. Six further treatment facilities were under construction to raise the regional capacity to 9.56 cubic metres per second (338 cu ft/s). In Lake Chapala, into which the Lerma River flows, water quality improved from 90% of the lake having poor water quality in 1989 to 85% of the lake having good quality in 1997. However, the worst water quality was still closest where the Lerma River discharged into the lake.

However, in the decade beginning in 2000, contamination levels of the river system were alarming, with studies in Michoacán and Guanajuato documenting an increase in cancer and neurocysticercosis in populations that live near the river. The Lerma River portion of the Lerma–Chapala basin is considered to be the most polluted, especially in stretches closest to its source near Almoloya del Río. Since 2005, industrial contaminants have become a serious concern as well as the continuing loss of plant life in and around the river itself. In 2005, thousands of fish suddenly died in the river in the municipality of Pénjamo in Guanajuato state when effluent flow depleted the oxygen in that part of the river. The lower parts of the river, closer to Lake Chapala are in better shape because there is less urbanization there.

== See also ==
- List of longest rivers of Mexico
- List of most-polluted rivers
