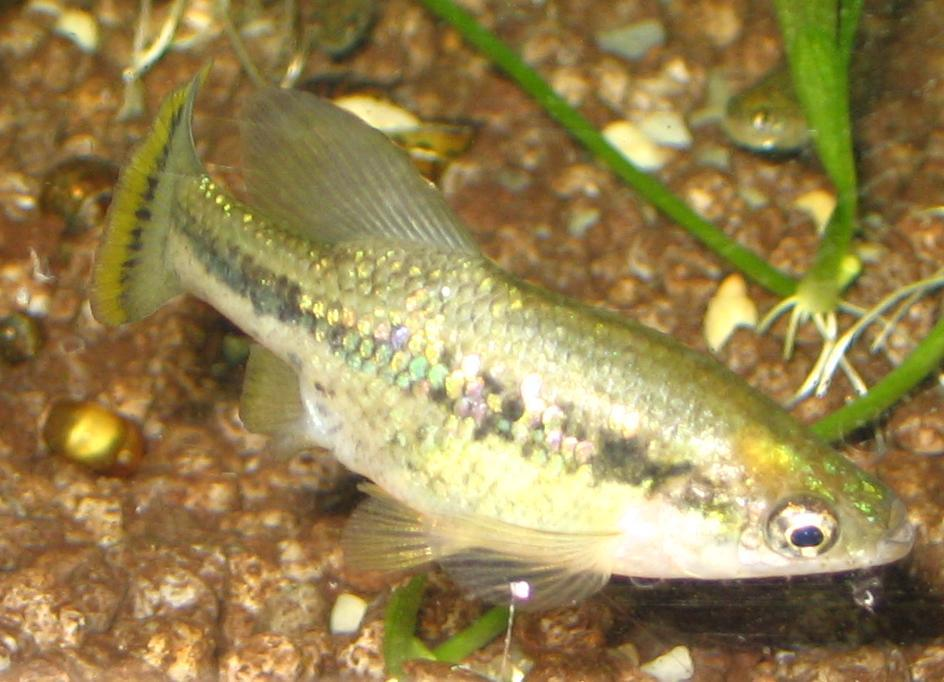
- Male in "relaxed" coloration. Note andropodium at anal fin

Conservation status
- Critically Endangered (IUCN 3.1)

Scientific classification
- Kingdom: Animalia
- Phylum: Chordata
- Class: Actinopterygii
- Order: Cyprinodontiformes
- Family: Goodeidae
- Subfamily: Goodeinae
- Genus: Ameca; R. R. Miller & Fitzsimons, 1971
- Species: A. splendens

Binomial name
- Ameca splendens R. R. Miller & Fitzsimons, 1971

= Butterfly splitfin =

Species of fish

The butterfly splitfin or butterfly goodeid (Ameca splendens) is a bony fish from the monotypic genus Ameca of the splitfin family (Goodeidae). It was formerly found throughout the Ameca River drainage in Mexico; the type locality is Rio Teuchitlán in the vicinity of Teuchitlán, Jalisco, near the town of Ameca. The species was historically only found in an area about 10 miles (15 km) in diameter but in the early 21st century, searches have found it in a few other locations in the region, up to 100 km away at Cuyacapán.

Today, the species is rated as critically endangered by the IUCN. A remnant population was found to persist in El Rincón waterpark, where the Rio Teuchitlán's springs have been dammed for bathing, between Teuchitlán town and he prehistoric site of Guachimontones, but it is unclear if this population still survives. Possibly, it also exists in a feral state in the United States; individuals apparently derived from escaped or introduced captive stock were found in Rogers Warm Spring in southeastern Nevada, but this was in the early 1980s, and the species' persistence there is unclear.

As of 2019, it is still found in low numbers in some other rivulets and springs of the Ameca River drainage. For some time, it was a popular fish among aquarists, but hobbyist stocks have declined more recently, placing its survival in jeopardy.

== Description ==
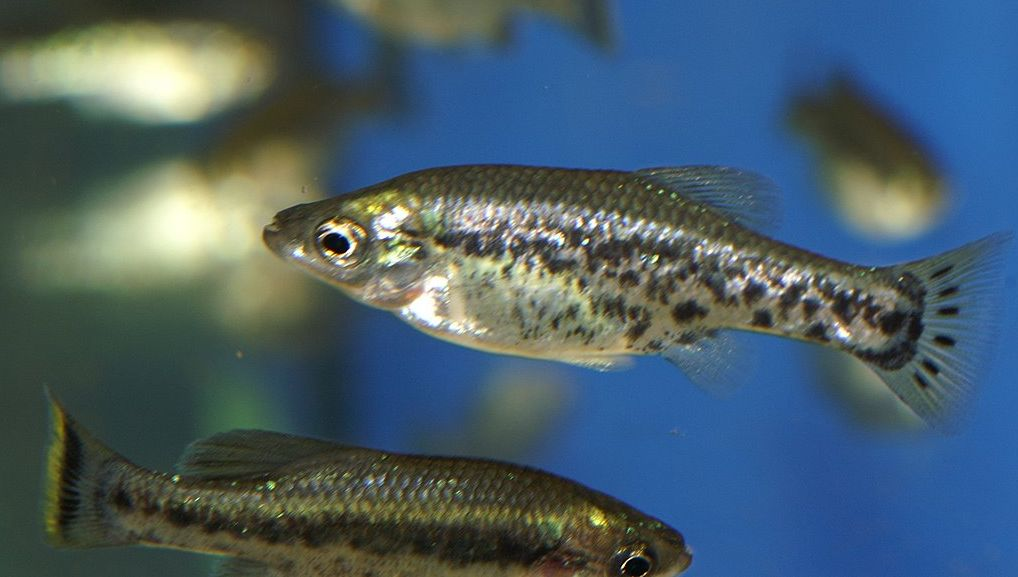
Female (above) being courted by a young male

As its common name implies, it is indeed quite an attractive fish. In a dominant mature male specimen the large dorsal fin is like the caudal fin washed with black. A yellow band stretches along the caudal's back margin. The body of both sexes is ochre, with silvery sides and a brownish back, which in males usually have numerous glittering metallic scales. Females and immatures having black dots on the sides and ochre fins. The fins of males intensify in color when they are excited, and depending on their mood, they can show more or less strongly a black band along the side. For the first two weeks or so after birth, the young are entirely silvery.

Males can also be told apart from females because their anal fin's front part splits off and transforms to a blunt, flexible andropodium used for mating. As usual in live-bearers, males are the smaller sex, reaching some 3 in (7–8 cm) total length at best, with females being able to grow up to 4 in (10 cm) under good conditions.

== Taxonomy ==
The butterfly splitfin is placed in the monotypic genus Ameca. Phylogenic research by Shane Webb showed that its closest relative is the jeweled splitfin Xenotoca variata, the type species of genus Xenotoca, which is actually more closely related to the butterfly splitfin than it is to the other species assigned to Xenotoca. Whether A.splendens warrants inclusion in Xenotoca or is better maintained as a monotypic genus is undecided as of 2024. Certainly, X.variata strongly resembles A.splendens in overall color pattern, in particular the males' black-and-yellow tail fin, while the more distantly related species traditionally assigned to Xenotoca have a uniformly reddish or yellowish tail.

== Ecology ==
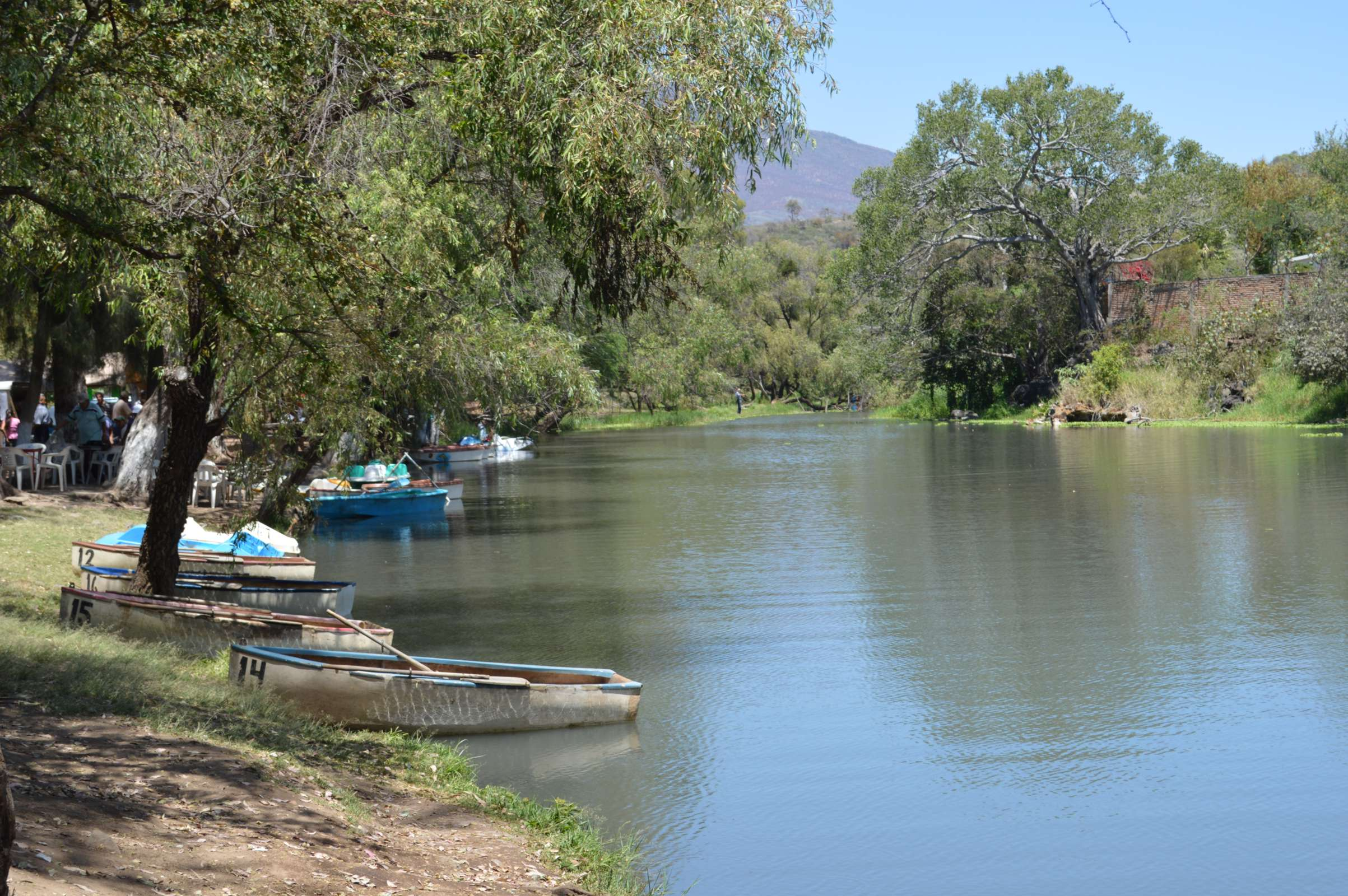
Rio Teuchitlán east of Teuchitlán town, looking north towards El Rincón waterpark and Guachimontones

In its former natural habitat, the bedrock is limestone, resulting in a hard and alkaline water with a general hardness of 6-10 dGH, while the temporary (carbonate) hardness is usually between 7 and 11°. The pH is around 8, and temperature varies little between the seasons, but ranges between about 70 and 85 °F (20 and 30 °C) between day and night. The vegetation is largely limited to algae and Ceratophyllum hornworts. The remnant wild population coexists with the native blackfin goodea (Goodea atripinnis) and Lerma live-bearer (Poeciliopsis infans), as well as with the common molly (Poecilia sphenops), Oreochromis tilapias, and the bluegill (Lepomis macrochirus) which presumably have all been introduced.

Among groups of A. splendens, a loose dominance hierarchy develops, in particular in confined environments. Males chase each other about, with the dominant male(s) showing the most splendid coloration. Submissive males will try to retreat from attacks, typically towards the surface, and may shake their head as a calming signal.

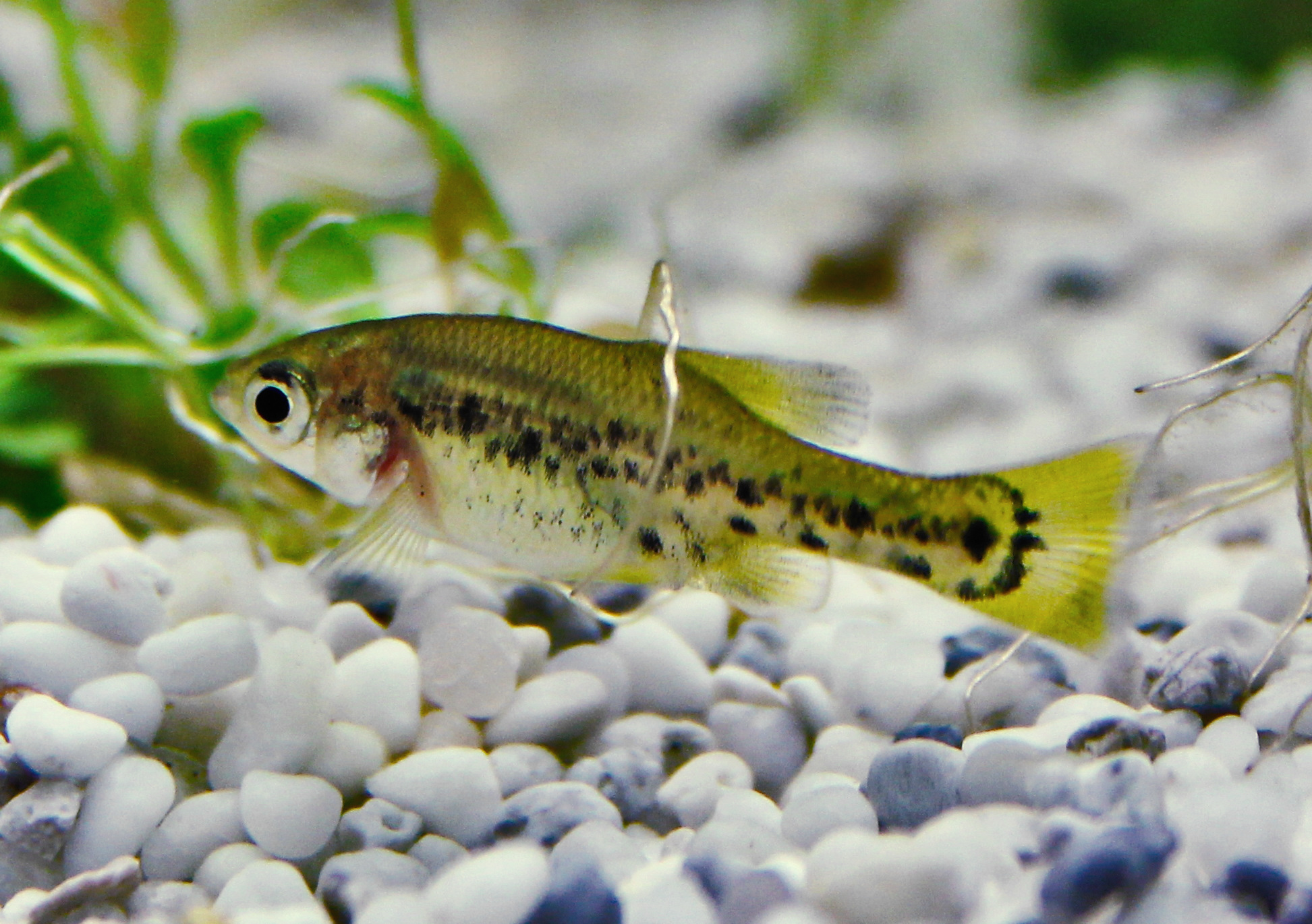
Immature individuals look like a slim female jeweled splitfin, with yellowish tails and fewer and larger side spots

Like other Goodeidae, butterfly splitfins mate by internal fertilization and spawn fully developed young. The females become sexually mature at about six months of age and can give birth every six to 10 weeks according to the water temperature and the condition of the fish. Mating is preceded by a courtship, where the males present themselves to the females with their heads pointing downwards – up to 45° from horizontal – and shake the forward part of their bodies. In that respect, they resemble the jeweled splitfin (Xenotoca variata); they do not have a ritualized "courtship dance" as some other splitfins, but the male sometimes rotates to present either flank to the female. The females respond by shaking their heads.

The fry when born can be up to 0.8 in (20 mm) in length, as the females feed the unborn young via trophotaenia which have a similar function as the umbilical cord in humans.

== As a pet ==
Many zoos and public aquariums maintain colonies of the species. The butterfly splitfin has a reputation of being a fin nipper; being a large and robust fish, it will certainly bully small and delicate species like guppies or small tetras. When housed with less tender species that require similar conditions, it is a great fish for any tank type; even the hardier species of Apistogramma and similar dwarf cichlids make good companions, with water parameters compromising between the splitfins' and the cichlids' requirements at a point similar to most tap water.

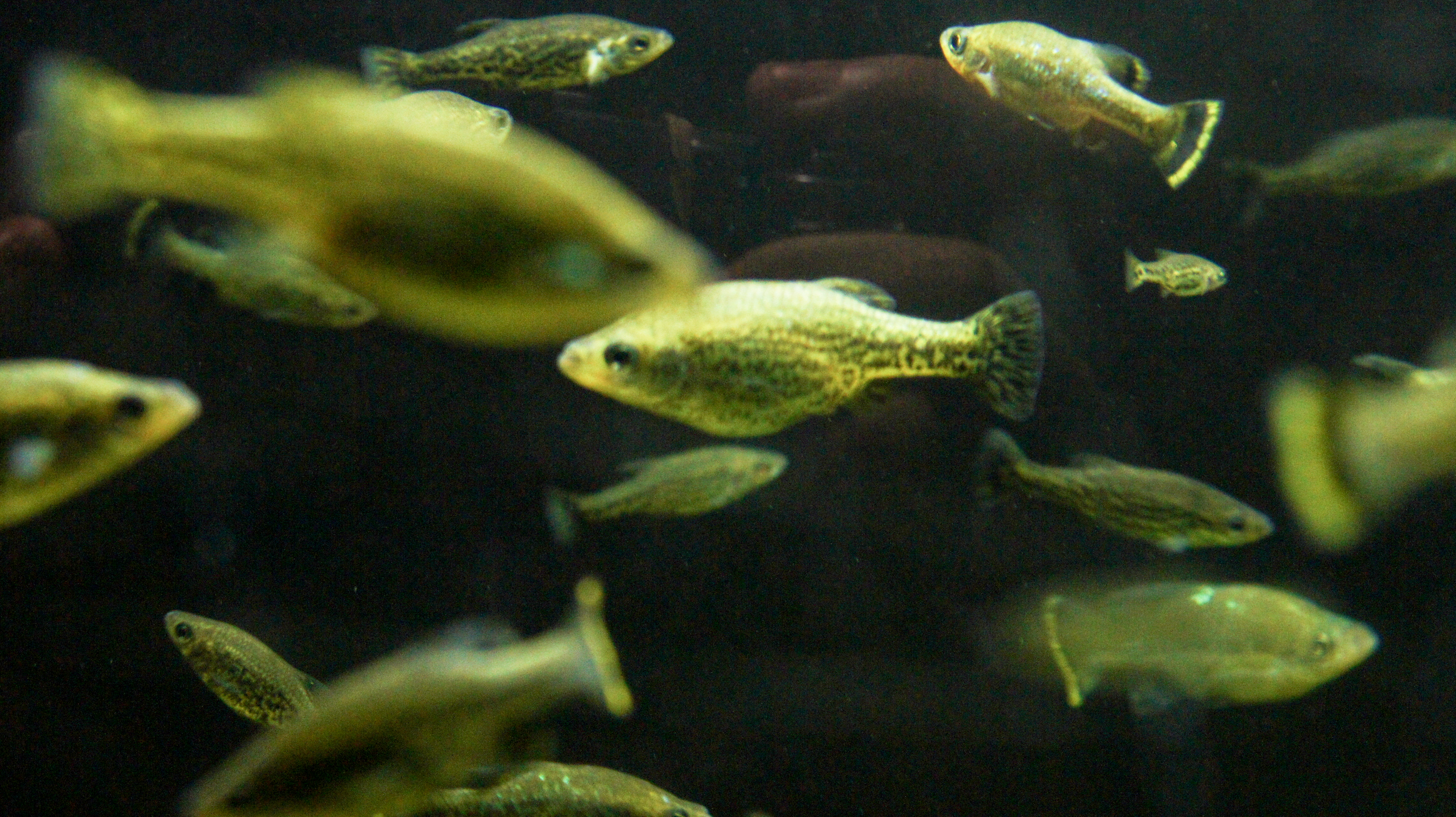
Butterfly splitfin being held in captivity at Birdworld

A. splendens thrives best in clean, well-aerated water, at temperatures around 70-75 °F (20-25 °C) and neutral or slightly higher pH, with water hardness between 5 and 10 dGH composed mainly from calcium hardness. They do not tolerate overly low pH and too soft water, and are unsuitable for dedicated rainforest aquaria with low pH and almost-zero hardness (e.g. for most tetras or danionins). Butterfly splitfins are strong swimmers and social fish; they dwell in groups of three to five males and three to seven females in large tanks where they can grow to full size. In small tanks, they stay small, and fewer individuals or no other fish should be kept. Their overall effect on plant growth is beneficial as they keep down algae and clean off detritus. A. splendens breeds quite readily in the aquarium; some floating plants such as Ceratopteris or Ceratophyllum provide protection for young fry.

Aggressiveness varies with population density; at high population densities, tank decoration is highly significant in influencing behavior. At least among captive populations, butterfly splitfins become more aggressive if much decoration is placed in the tank.

Butterfly splitfins are voracious, and eat most forms of commercial fish food. They take live prey up to the size of week-old guppy fry, but need plant material, ideally green algae, to thrive. They are ideal algae eaters for tanks with small, hard-water cichlids. If not enough algae are available, vegetables such as lettuce, spinach, or green peas are recommended additions to the diet. Fry do not need "baby" food such as brine shrimp or nauplia, though as in adults, plant food increase growth and vitality.

Lighting should be strong, to encourage growth of algae; direct sunlight is ideal. In summer, they can be kept in outside tanks, basins, or small ponds in temperate and warmer areas; they can tolerate overnight air temperatures of 60 °F (15 °C) well enough, but should be protected from birds, cats, and other predators.

== See also ==
- Golden skiffia, San Marcos redtail splitfin and tequila splitfin, close relatives of A.splendens, formerly endemic to the same region and likewise extinct or very rare in the wild
- Ameca shiner, an unrelated fish species formerly endemic to the same region and also extinct or very rare in the wild
