= Ilyodon lennoni =

Scientific classification
- Kingdom: Animalia
- Phylum: Chordata
- Class: Actinopterygii
- Order: Cyprinodontiformes
- Family: Goodeidae
- Genus: Ilyodon
- Species: I. lennoni

Binomial name
- Ilyodon lennoni M. K. Meyer & W. Förster, 1983

Species of fish

Ilyodon lennoni, the Chacambero splitfin, is a species of splitfin endemic to Mexico. This species grows to a length of 7 centimetres (2.8 in) TL. It has been considered to be a junior synonym of I. whitei, but is currently considered to be a valid species by Fishbase and the California Academy of Sciences. The specific name honours John Lennon (1940-1980), the singer and guitarist with The Beatles.

== See also ==
- Bumba lennoni
- List of organisms named after famous people (born 1925–1949)
