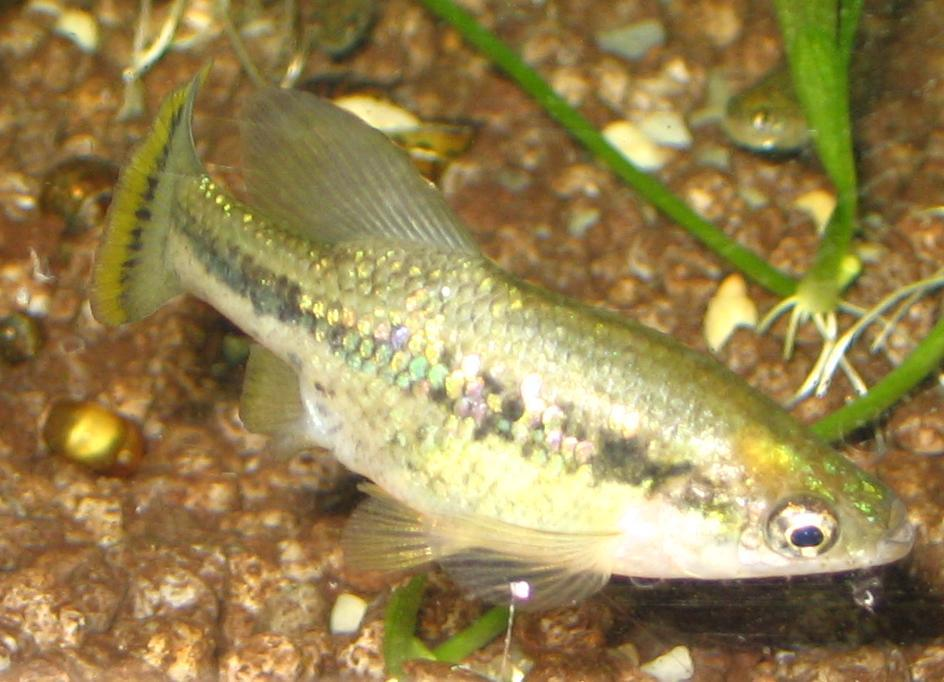
- Ameca splendens

Scientific classification
- Kingdom: Animalia
- Phylum: Chordata
- Class: Actinopterygii
- Order: Cyprinodontiformes
- Family: Goodeidae
- Subfamily: Goodeinae; Jordan & Gilbert 1883

Genera
- see text

= Goodeinae =

Subfamily of fishes

Goodeinae is a subfamily of splitfins from Mexico, part of the family Goodeidae. They are small fish which mostly live in fresh water, especially around Mesa Central, west of Mexico City. Members of the subfamily are also found in brackish water on both the east and west coasts. They typically have small ranges and many are seriously threatened (some already extinct). The subfamily takes its name from its type genus Goodea and so is ultimately named after the American ichthyologist George Brown Goode (1851-1896).

== Genera ==
The following genera make up the subfamily Goodeinae:

- Allodontichthys C. L. Hubbs & C. L. Turner, 1939
- Alloophorus Hubbs & Turner, 1939
- Allotoca Hubbs & Turner, 1939
- Ameca R. R. Miller & Fitzsimons, 1971
- Ataeniobius Hubbs & Turner, 1939
- Chapalichthys Hubbs, 1926
- Characodon Günther, 1866
- Girardinichthys Bleeker, 1860
- Goodea Jordan, 1880
- Hubbsina de Buen, 1940
- Ilyodon C. H. Eigenmann, 1907
- Skiffia Meek 1902
- Xenoophorus Hubbs & Turner, 1939
- Xenotaenia Turner, 1946
- Xenotoca Hubbs & Turner, 1939
- Zoogoneticus Meek, 1902
