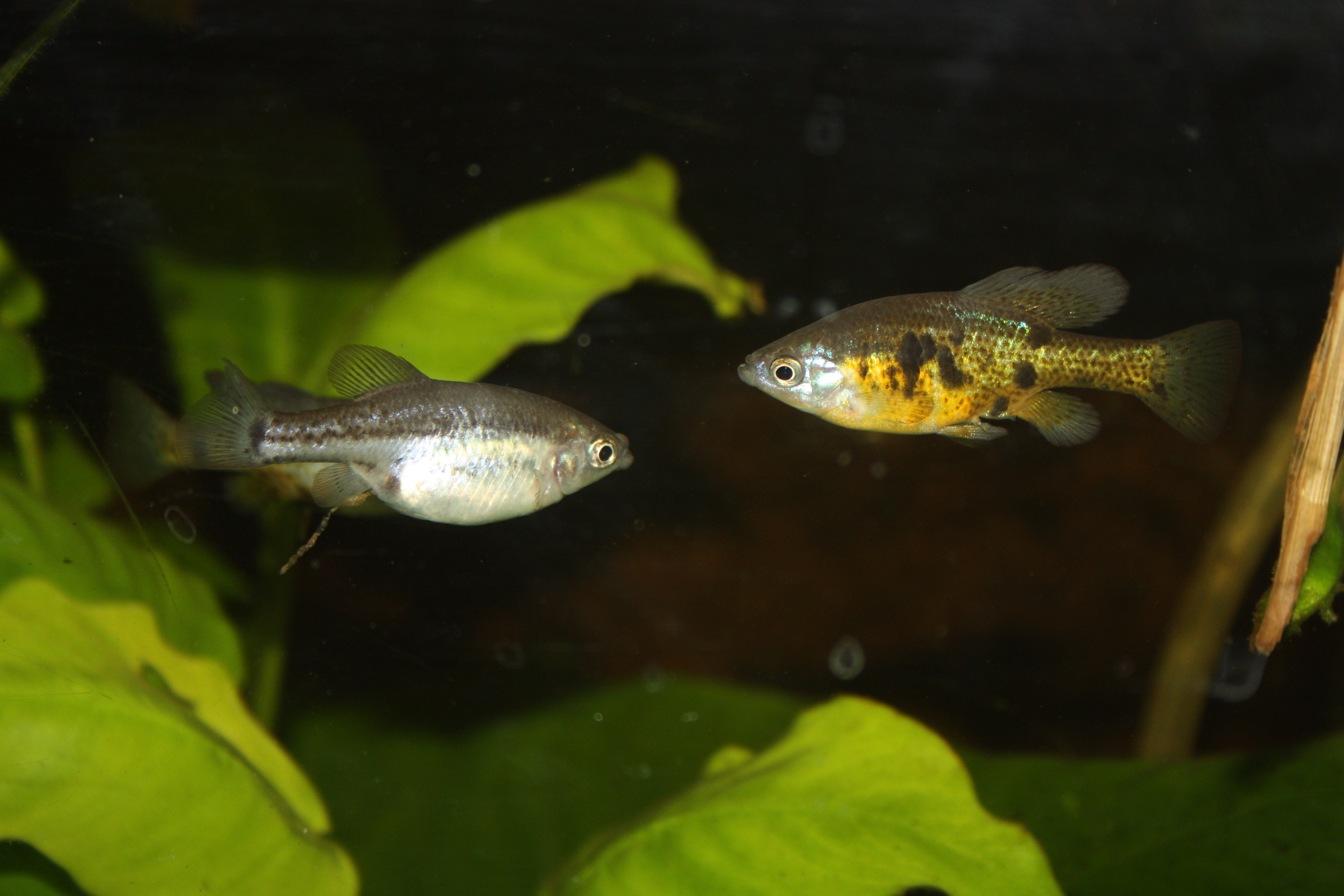

Conservation status
- Endangered (IUCN 3.1)

Scientific classification
- Kingdom: Animalia
- Phylum: Chordata
- Class: Actinopterygii
- Order: Cyprinodontiformes
- Family: Goodeidae
- Genus: Skiffia
- Species: S. multipunctata

Binomial name
- Skiffia multipunctata (Pellegrin, 1901)

Synonyms
- Goodea multipunctata (Pellegrin, 1901); Ollentodon multipunctatus (Pellegrin, 1901); Xenendum multipunctatum Pellegrin, 1901

= Spotted skiffia =

Species of fish

The spotted skiffia (Skiffia multipunctata) is a species of live bearing ray-finned fish within the family Goodeidae. Males of the species grow to a length of 5 centimetres (2.0 in), with a golden orange base color with varying patterns of black spots, along with a wide and long dorsal fin. Females of the species grow to a length of 6 centimetres (2.4 in), with silver gray coloring with black spots. This species is also kept in the aquarium hobby.

== Ecology ==
The spotted skiffia is endemic to Mexico in the federal states of Jalisco and Michoacán. It was known to historically inhabit the lower Lerma River drainage where it was also included in several affluents such as the Duero River, Grande de Santiago River drainage and Lake Chapala drainage near Guadalajara. The only healthy population of the species however now remains in the Duero River drainage due to pollution, industrial development, habitat destruction, and invasive species in its previous distributions. It has also disappeared from Lake Camécuaro National Park due to introduced largemouth bass. The habitat of the species is small lakes, river channels, spring-fed ponds and ditches over substrates of silt, mud, sand, and rocks, where it prefers depths of less than a meter in clear to turbid water with little to no currents. If there are Taxodium roots the species will often use them as refuge and feed off aufwuchs and algae that grows on the roots.

== Conservation ==
Due to a loss in distribution from pollution, habitat modifications, and invasive species, with its only current healthy population in the Duero River drainage facing stream channelization and water diversions in its lower portions, the IUCN Red List has assessed the spotted skiffia as 'Endangered' in 2018.
