= Railroad Valley springfish =

Conservation status
- Vulnerable (IUCN 3.1)

- Threatened (ESA)

Scientific classification
- Kingdom: Animalia
- Phylum: Chordata
- Class: Actinopterygii
- Order: Cyprinodontiformes
- Family: Goodeidae
- Genus: Crenichthys
- Species: C. nevadae

Binomial name
- Crenichthys nevadae C. L. Hubbs, 1932

Species of fish

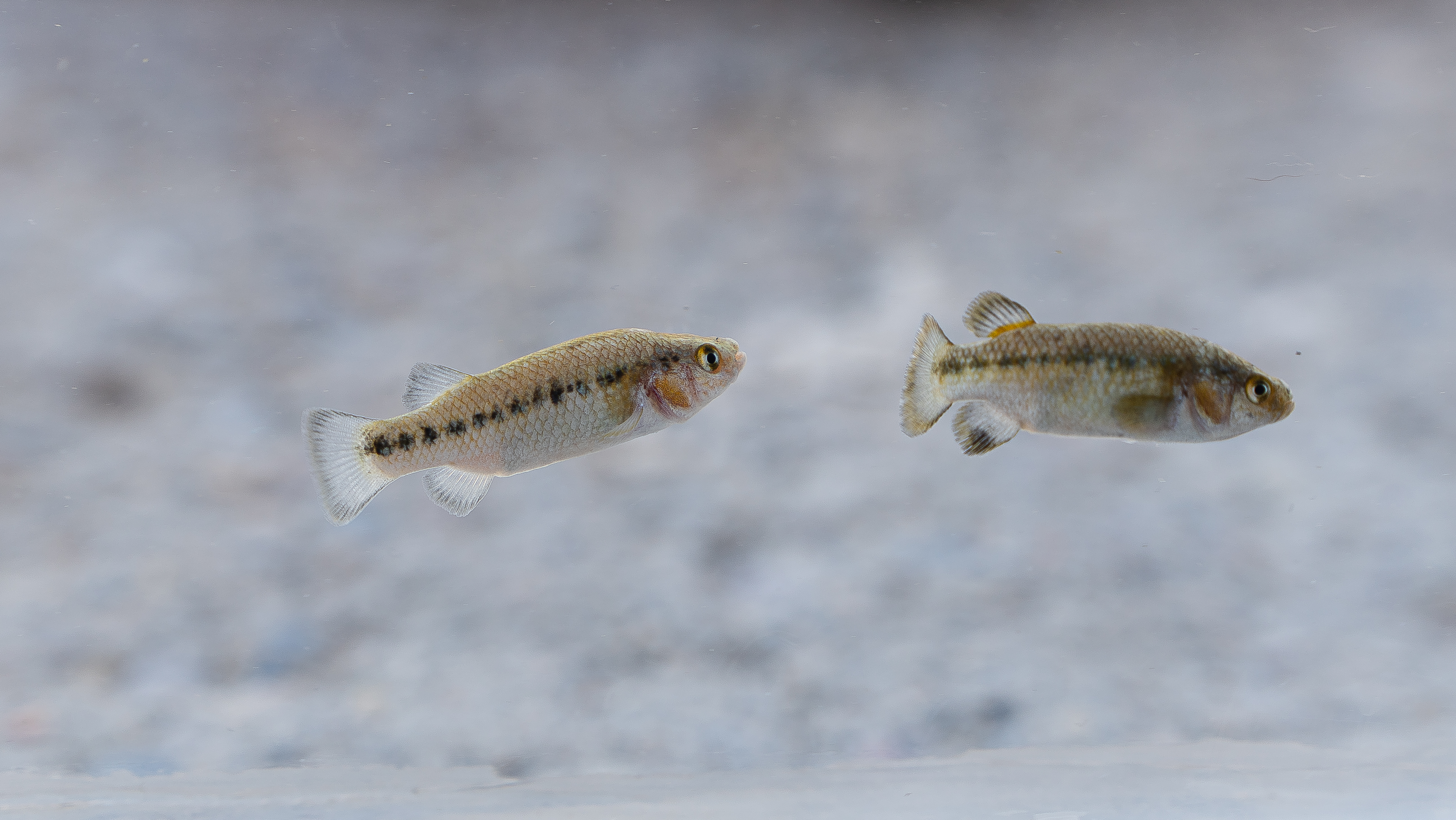

The Railroad Valley springfish, Crenichthys nevadae, is a rare goodeid fish of the Great Basin of western United States, occurring naturally in just seven thermal springs of Railroad Valley in Nye County, Nevada.

The body gives a somewhat heavy or massive impression, particularly forward, the head being almost as wide as deep. Each side has a distinctive row of dark blotches, with pale bars in between. The pelvic fins are entirely absent, while the anal fin is large, with 13 rays. The dorsal fin is set far back on the body, just above the anal fin, and is somewhat smaller than the anal fin, with 12 rays.

This springfish is omnivorous, with animal food representing 2/3 or more of its consumption during the summer, primarily consisting of gastropods. Plant consumption is mostly filamentous algae. While intestine length is consistent with an omnivore, Sigler & Sigler suggest that the high water temperatures of the springfish habitat may demand the higher energy available with animal food.

The warm springs in which these are found range in temperature from 77 to 102 °F (25 to 39 °C).

The Railroad Valley springfish is federally listed as a species threatened with extinction. Its extremely limited range makes it vulnerable to competition from introduced species, and to habitat modifications. For instance, it was nearly eliminated from Duckwater Spring in the early 1980s by introduced channel catfish. The springfish has been introduced to Chimney Springs and Hot Creek Canyon in Nye County, Nevada.
