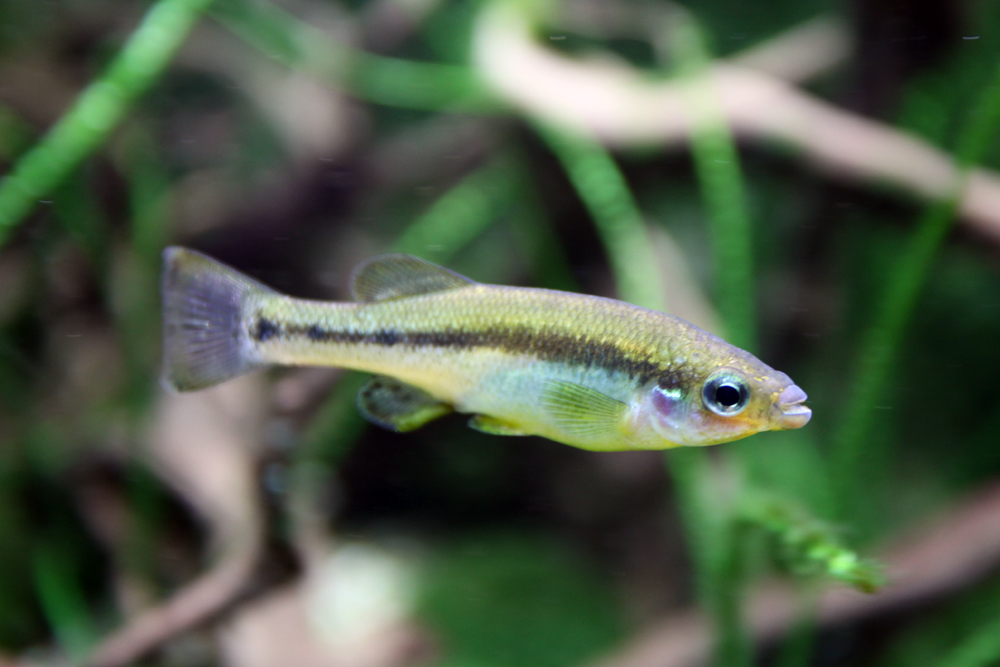

Scientific classification
- Kingdom: Animalia
- Phylum: Chordata
- Class: Actinopterygii
- Order: Cyprinodontiformes
- Family: Goodeidae
- Subfamily: Goodeinae
- Genus: Ilyodon; C. H. Eigenmann, 1907

Type species
- Ilyodon paraguayense, a synonym of Ilyodon furcidens Eigenmann. 1907

= Ilyodon =

Genus of fishes

Ilyodon is a genus of splitfins found in the Pacific slope river basins of Balsas, Tuxpan (Coahuayana), Purificación, Chacala (Marabasco), Armería and Ameca in western Mexico.

== Species ==
There are currently five recognized species in this genus according to FishBase, but only I. furcidens and I. whitei are indisputably valid (the remaining are then considered variants of those two).

- Ilyodon cortesae Paulo-Maya & Trujillo-Jiménez, 2000 (Freckled Splitfin)
- Ilyodon furcidens (D. S. Jordan & C. H. Gilbert, 1882) (Goldbreast Splitfin)
- Ilyodon lennoni M. K. Meyer & W. Förster, 1983 (Chacambero Splitfin)
- Ilyodon whitei (Meek, 1904) (Balsas Splitfin)
- Ilyodon xantusi C. L. Hubbs & C. L. Turner, 1939 (Limones Splitfin)
