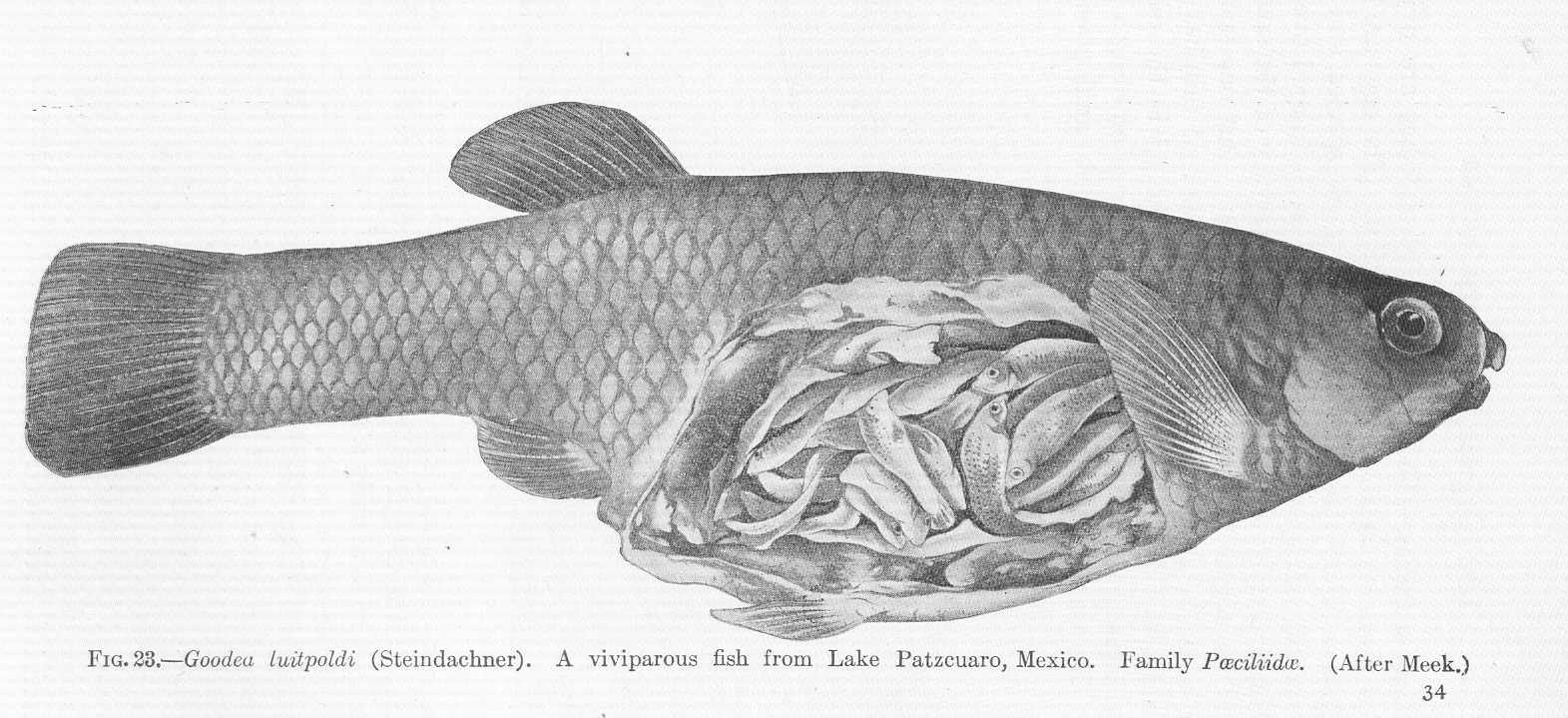

Scientific classification
- Kingdom: Animalia
- Phylum: Chordata
- Class: Actinopterygii
- Order: Cyprinodontiformes
- Family: Goodeidae
- Genus: Goodea
- Species: G. luitpoldii

Binomial name
- Goodea luitpoldii (Steindachner, 1894)

Synonyms
- Characodon luitpoldii Steindachner, 1894

= Goodea luitpoldii =

Species of fish

Goodea luitpoldii, the green goodea, is a species of killifish from the family Goodeidae which is endemic to the drainage basin of the Lerma River and the Grande de Santiago River in Mexico. This species was Species description described as Characodon luitpoldii by Franz Steindachner in 1894 with the type locality given as Lake Pátzcuaro in Michoacán. The identity of the person honoured in its specific name is unknown but it is thought likely to be Luitpold, Prince Regent of Bavaria (1821-1912) whose daughter, Princess Therese of Bavaria (1850-1925) was an explorer and amateur naturalist and she collected the type.
