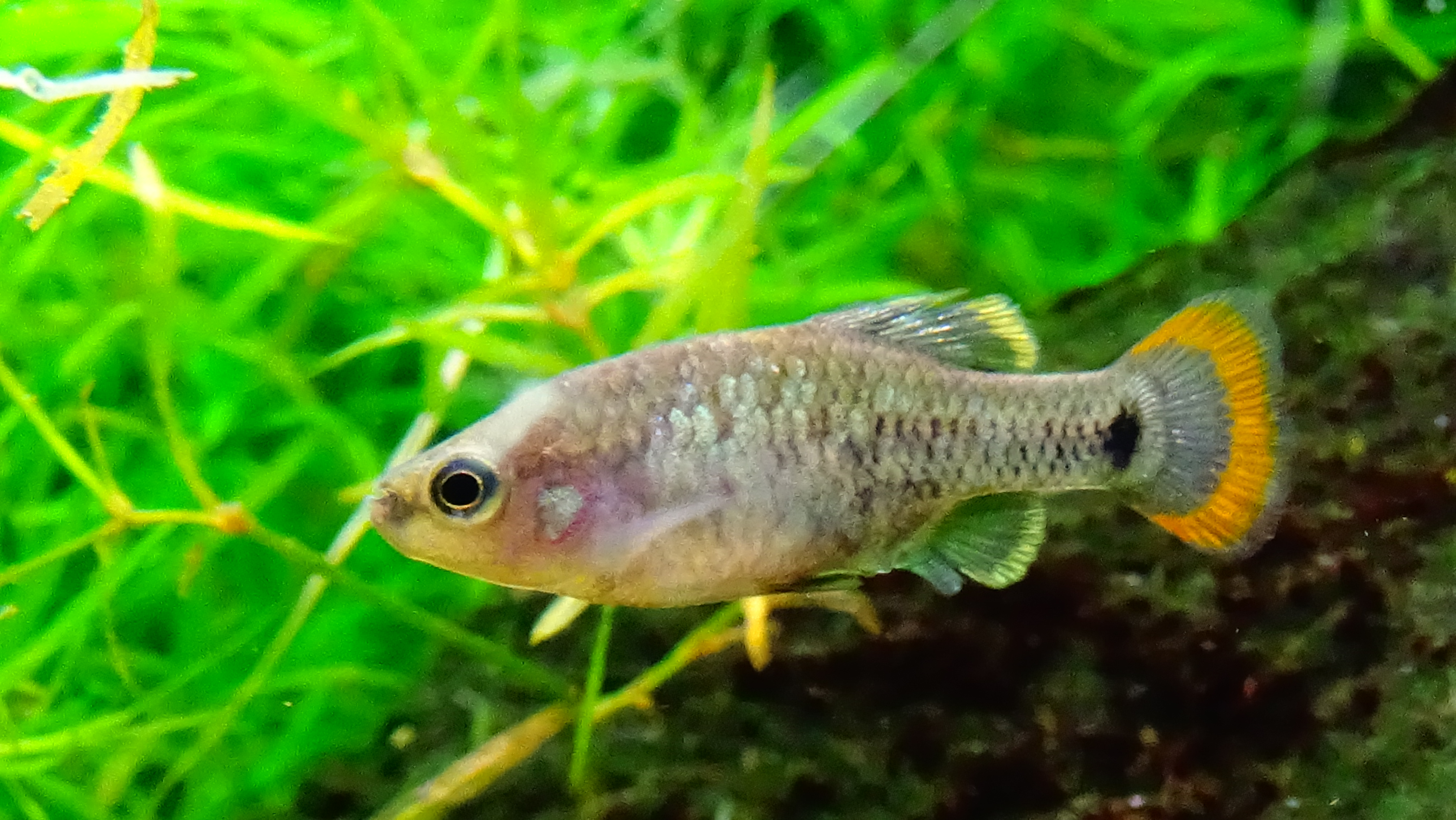
- Zoogoneticus tequila

Scientific classification
- Kingdom: Animalia
- Phylum: Chordata
- Class: Actinopterygii
- Order: Cyprinodontiformes
- Family: Goodeidae
- Subfamily: Goodeinae
- Genus: Zoogoneticus; Meek, 1902

Type species
- Platypoecilus quitzeoensis Bean, 1898

= Zoogoneticus =

Genus of fishes

Zoogoneticus is a genus of splitfins that are endemic to the Lerma–Chapala–Grande de Santiago, Armería, Ameca, Cuitzeo and Zacapu basins in west-central Mexico. They inhabit lakes, streams, ponds, canals and ditches, and prefer shallow waters with no or only a moderate current. They are predators that feed on small invertebrates. Members of the Zoogoneticus genus are all fairly small fish, reaching up to 8 cm (3 in) in total length.

== Species ==
There are currently three recognized species in this genus:

- Zoogoneticus purhepechus Domínguez-Domínguez, Pérez-Rodríguez & Doadrio, 2008
- Zoogoneticus quitzeoensis (B. A. Bean, 1898) (Picotee goodeid)
- Zoogoneticus tequila Webb & R. R. Miller, 1998 (Tequila splitfin)
