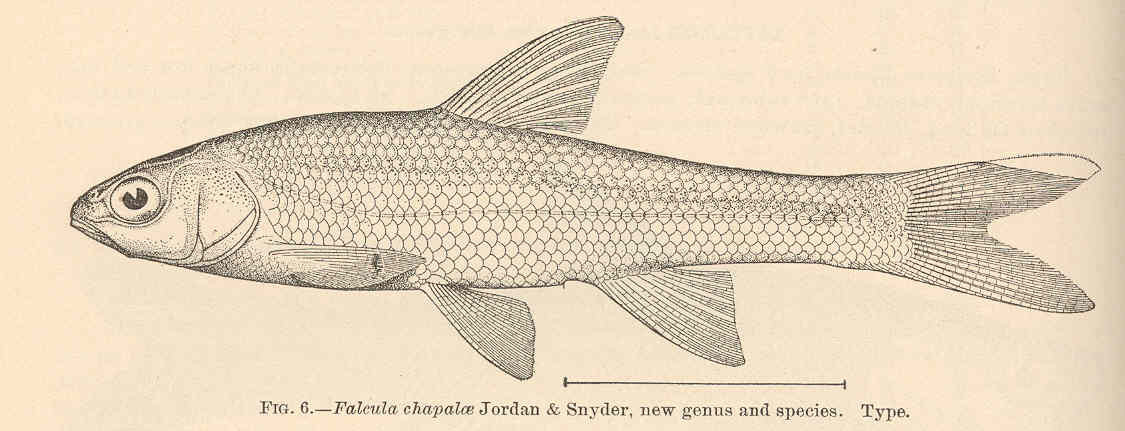
- Chapala chub (Yuriria chapalae)

Scientific classification
- Kingdom: Animalia
- Phylum: Chordata
- Class: Actinopterygii
- Order: Cypriniformes
- Family: Leuciscidae
- Subfamily: Pogonichthyinae
- Genus: Yuriria; D. S. Jordan & Evermann, 1896

Type species
- Hudsonius altus D. S. Jordan, 1880

Synonyms
- Falcula D. S. Jordan & Snyder, 1903; Falcularius D. S. Jordan & Snyder, 1899

= Yuriria (fish) =

Genus of fishes

Yuriria is a genus of freshwater ray-finned fish belonging to the family Leuciscidae, the shiners, daces and minnows. The fish in this genus are endemic to the Lerma–Chapala–Grande de Santiago and Ameca basins in Mexico.

== Species ==
Yuriria contains the following species:

- Yuriria alta (D. S. Jordan, 1880) (Jalisco chub)
- Yuriria amatlana Domínguez-Domínguez, Pompa-Domínguez & Doadrio, 2007
- Yuriria chapalae (D. S. Jordan & Snyder, 1899) (Chapala chub)
