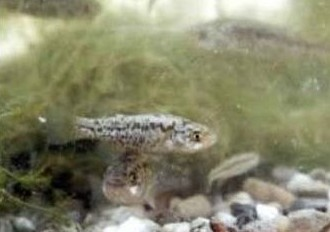

Conservation status
- Critically Endangered (IUCN 3.1)

- Critically Imperiled (NatureServe)

Scientific classification
- Kingdom: Animalia
- Phylum: Chordata
- Class: Actinopterygii
- Division: Teleostei
- Order: Cyprinodontiformes
- Family: Goodeidae
- Genus: Empetrichthys
- Species: E. latos

Binomial name
- Empetrichthys latos R. R. Miller, 1948

= Empetrichthys latos =

Species of fish

Empetrichthys latos is a rare species of fish in the family Goodeidae, the splitfins. It is known by the common names Pahrump poolfish and Pahrump killifish, the former being more correct today. It is endemic to Nevada in the United States, where it was limited to the Pahrump Valley near the California border. It nearly became extinct due to habitat destruction and no longer occurs there. It is a federally listed endangered species of the United States. The Pahrump Poolfish is long-lived for a small-bodied fish, with ages up to 10 years for females and 7 years for males documented.

The Pahrump Poolfish is sexually dimorphic; females being significantly larger. This is an important consideration for management as establishing populations with a balanced sex ratio is likely desired. This fish reaches a maximum length of about 7 cm (2.8 in). It has its dorsal and anal fins far back on its body and it lacks pelvic fins. The head is depressed in front and the mouth is wide. The jaws are unequal, the lower projecting farther than the upper. The fish is greenish on its back and silvery green on the belly. The male takes on a blue tinge during spawning.

It is omnivorous, feeding on varied plant and animal material. Spawning is most common in spring but can occur at any time of the year when conditions are right. Adults are more active at night, but juveniles appear to be more active during the day. The native habitat of the fish was made up of pools and marshes. The water at one pool was a constant 24 °C (75 °F). This may be the optimal temperature for the species but it can tolerate a relatively wide range of temperatures. It has been noted to survive under a layer of ice during winter. The water is alkaline.

This species is the only surviving member of genus Empetrichthys, the other, the Ash Meadows killifish (Empetrichthys merriami), having become extinct in the 1940s. There were three subspecies of E. latos, two of which are extinct today. Each occurred in a different spring in the Pahrump Valley. The Raycraft Ranch springfish (E. latos concavus) became extinct when its spring was destroyed in the 1950s. The Pahrump Ranch killifish (E. latos pahrump) disappeared when its spring was pumped dry in 1958. The remaining fish is the nominal subspecies E. latos latos. It is known simply as the Pahrump poolfish.

In 1975 the Pahrump poolfish was extirpated from its habitat, Manse Spring, when it experienced competition from the introduced goldfish, some vegetation was removed, and the spring dried up due to groundwater pumping nearby. On noting its impending extinction, scientists and officials removed specimens of the fish and transplanted them into three pools in different locations in Nevada. When the official recovery plan for the species was published by the United States Fish and Wildlife Service in 1980, it aimed to manage and protect the three transplanted populations. The fish has not been returned to its native habitat at Manse Spring because the area is under development and the water supply is not reliable.

Though the fish reproduced successfully and appeared to thrive in its new pools, it faced a number of challenges there. Flooding destroyed one of the pools, vandalism killed specimens at another, and the unauthorized introduction of mosquitofish and crawfish further threatened the fish. Some fish were transplanted into a reservoir to replace the flooded population, but the USFWS had to intervene when Nevada State Parks officials planned to dredge the pond. Today the populations remain, but the habitat must be artificially maintained at times. As of 2004 only one population is stable. Threats still exist from groundwater pumping, vandalism, and introduced species. In 2018, the Southern Nevada Water Authority is planning on establishing a refuge population into ponds at the Las Vegas Springs Preserve. The USFWS still considers the species to be "in imminent danger of extinction" and is maintaining its endangered status.
