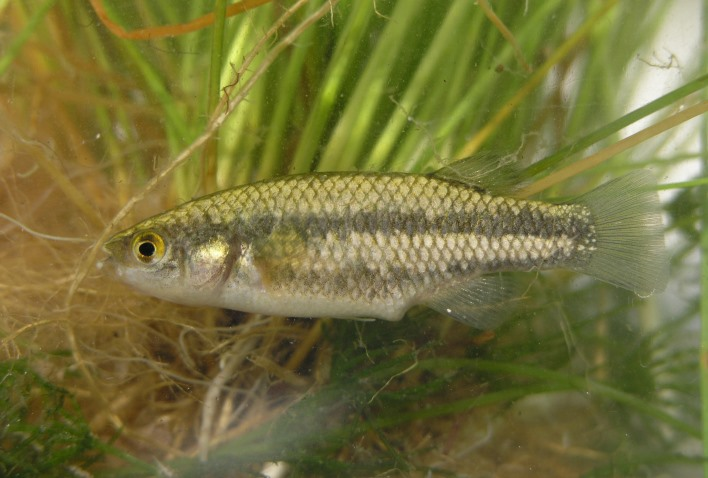
- Crenichthys baileyi moapae

Conservation status
- Endangered (IUCN 3.1)

Scientific classification
- Kingdom: Animalia
- Phylum: Chordata
- Class: Actinopterygii
- Order: Cyprinodontiformes
- Family: Goodeidae
- Genus: Crenichthys
- Species: C. baileyi

Binomial name
- Crenichthys baileyi (C. H. Gilbert, 1893)

Synonyms
- Cyprinodon macularius baileyi Gilbert, 1893

= White River springfish =

Species of fish

The White River springfish (Crenichthys baileyi) is a species of fish in the family Goodeidae, the splitfins. It is a rare species of the Great Basin of western United States, where it is endemic to isolated warm springs in the White River drainage of eastern Nevada.

Each side has two rows of dark blotches. The pelvic fins are entirely absent, while the anal fin is large, with 14 rays. The dorsal fin is set far back on the body, just above the anal fin, and is somewhat smaller than the anal fin, with 11 rays.

== Subspecies ==
FishBase records five subspecies:

- Crenichthys baileyi albivallis J. E. Williams & Wilde, 1981 – Preston White River springfish
- Crenichthys baileyi baileyi (C. H. Gilbert, 1893) – White River springfish
- Crenichthys baileyi grandis J. E. Williams & Wilde, 1981 – Hiko White River springfish
- Crenichthys baileyi moapae J. E. Williams & Wilde, 1981 – Moapa White River springfish
- Crenichthys baileyi thermophilus J. E. Williams & Wilde, 1981 – Mormon White River springfish

Of these subspecies, Crenicthys baileyi grandis and Crenicthys baileyi baileyi are listed as endangered species under the U.S. Endangered Species Act.

== Etymology ==
The genus name is a compound of creno meaning "spring", a reference to the desert springs this species occurs in, and ichthys which is Greek for "fish". The specific name honours the American ethnologist and naturalist Vernon Orlando Bailey (1864-1942), who co-collected the type along with C. Hart Merriam.
