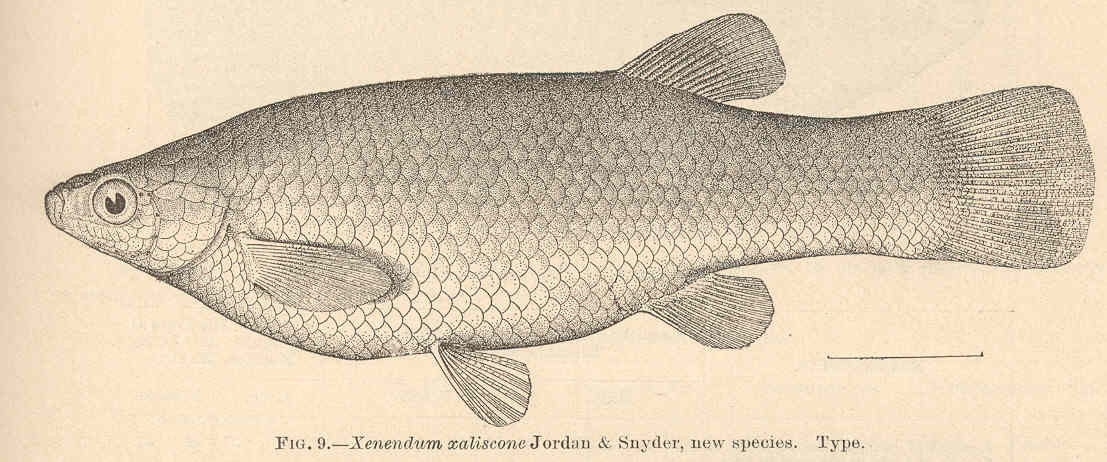
- Skiffia multipunctata

Scientific classification
- Kingdom: Animalia
- Phylum: Chordata
- Class: Actinopterygii
- Order: Cyprinodontiformes
- Family: Goodeidae
- Subfamily: Goodeinae
- Genus: Skiffia; Meek, 1902

Type species
- Skiffia lermae Meek, 1902

Species
- See text.

= Skiffia =

Genus of fishes

Skiffia is a genus of goodeid fish that contains four species, endemic to the Mesa Central area of west-central Mexico. They are restricted to the Lerma–Grande de Santiago, Ameca and Grande de Morelia river basins, including lakes Chapala, Pátzcuaro, Zirahuén and Cuitzeo. They inhabit stagnant or slow-moving waters such as lakes, ponds, channels and ditches, and prefer shallow depths.

They typically have a limited tolerance to environmental degradation, and so are susceptible to anthropogenic disturbance. The exception to this is S. bilineata, which is comparatively more tolerant to eutrophication, turbidity and seasonal changes in environmental conditions. All four Skiffia species face some conservation threat and have suffered local extinctions in more than 50% of areas studied where they were previously known to have existed. S. lermae and S. bilineata are the most widely distributed of the genus, found over the states of Michoacán, Jalisco and Guanajuato. S. multipunctata has a restricted distribution in Michoacán and S. francesae has been declared extinct in the wild by the IUCN. There is only one locality from which captive S. francesae stocks have been derived (Teuchitlán). Captive populations of S. francesae are maintained in a variety of locations by aquarium hobbyists, research institutes and zoos. The history of this particular species is unclear, but they are believed to have descended from one stock collected by Dr. R. Miller in 1976; it appears that no other stocks descended from independent samples from this region.

They are small fish that generally reach a standard length between about 4 and 7 cm (1.6–2.8 in). Males are more colorful than females and have markings in yellowish or blackish.

== Species ==
There are currently four recognized species in this genus according to FishBase, but S. bilineata is distinctive and some authorities prefer to place it in its own genus Neotoca.

- Skiffia bilineata (T. H. Bean, 1887) (Twoline skiffia)
- Skiffia francesae Kingston, 1978 (Golden skiffia)
- Skiffia lermae Meek, 1902 (Olive skiffia)
- Skiffia multipunctata (Pellegrin, 1901) (Spotted skiffia)
