= Allodontichthys =

Scientific classification
- Kingdom: Animalia
- Phylum: Chordata
- Class: Actinopterygii
- Order: Cyprinodontiformes
- Family: Goodeidae
- Subfamily: Goodeinae
- Genus: Allodontichthys; C. L. Hubbs & C. L. Turner, 1939

Type species
- Zoogoneticus zonistius Hubbs, 1932

Genus of fishes

Allodontichthys is a genus of splitfins, endemic to the Tuxpan (Coahuayana), Armería and Ameca river basins in Colima and Jalisco, west–central Mexico.

== Species ==
There are currently four recognized species in this genus:

- Allodontichthys hubbsi R. R. Miller & Uyeno, 1980 (Whitepatched splitfin)
- Allodontichthys polylepis Rauchengerger, 1988 (Finescale splitfin)
- Allodontichthys tamazulae C. L. Turner, 1946 (Tuxpan splitfin)
- Allodontichthys zonistius (C. L. Hubbs, 1932) (Bandfin splitfin)
