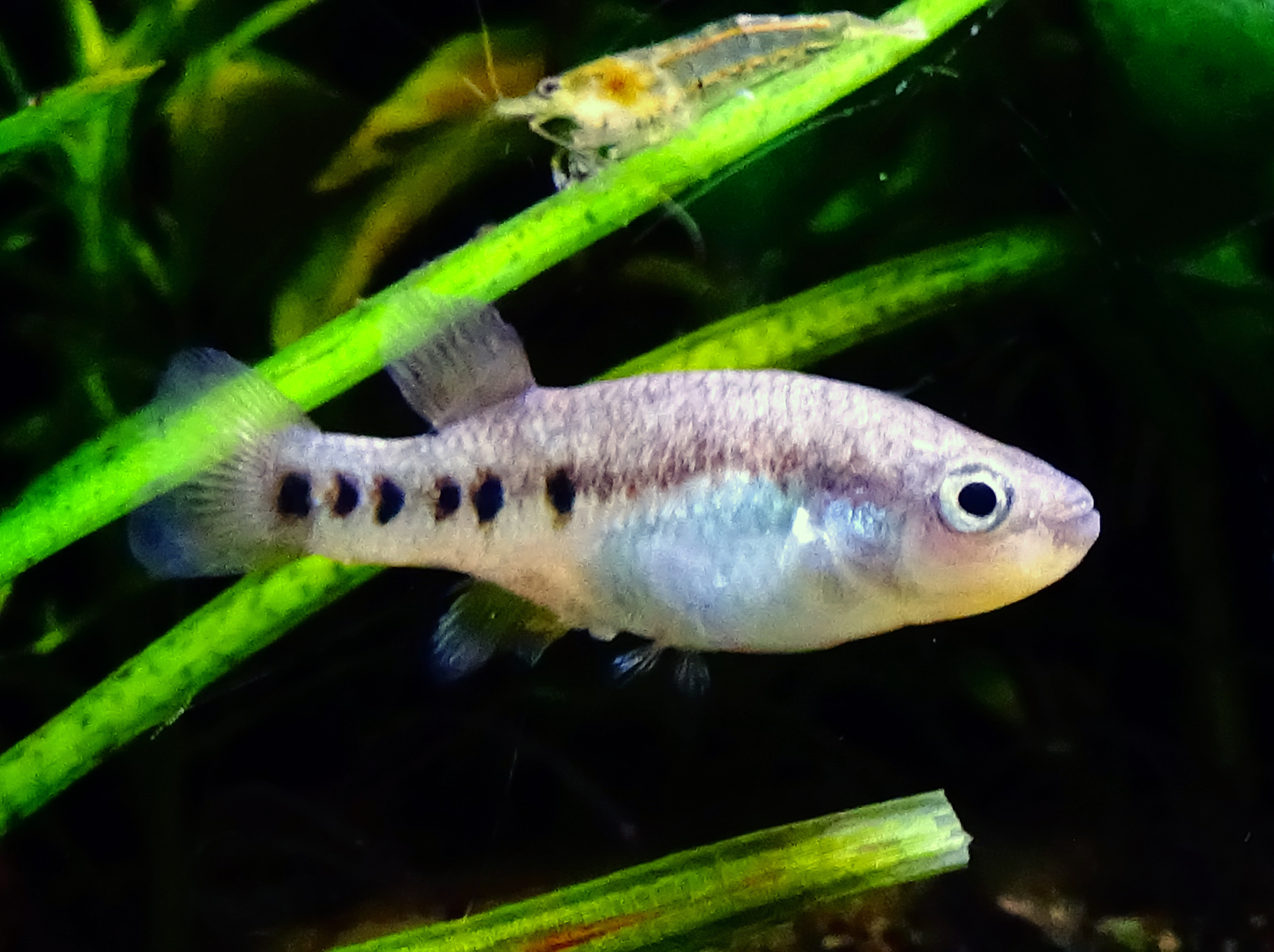

Conservation status
- Critically Endangered (IUCN 3.1)

Scientific classification
- Kingdom: Animalia
- Phylum: Chordata
- Class: Actinopterygii
- Order: Cyprinodontiformes
- Family: Goodeidae
- Genus: Characodon
- Species: C. lateralis

Binomial name
- Characodon lateralis Günther, 1866

= Rainbow goodeid =

Endangered species of fish endemic to Mexico

The rainbow goodeid (Characodon lateralis) is a species of critically endangered freshwater fish in the family Goodeidae, and are endemic to Mexico. Specifically, they are found in shallow springs and ponds in the Durango and Coahuila area. They were first identified in 1866 by Albert Günther.

== Related species ==
There are only three species known in the genus Characodon.

- Genus Characodon
  - Bold Characodon (C. audax)
  - Parras Characodon (C. garmani) -extinct
  - Rainbow Goodeid (C. lateralis)

== Anatomy ==
The rainbow goodeid is a small sexually dimorphic fish, averaging 42mm in size for males and 65mm for females. The phenotype exhibited varies greatly due to the separation of its populations. Head shape is the greatest variant between groups. Males are generally more colorful and larger-bodied, showing a blue or green body with red accents and a silver luster. They exhibit a modified anal fin (andropodium), used for aiding sperm transfer in internal fertilization. The unpaired fins are yellow, black, or red in color. A black band is often seen on or near the anal fin. The dorsal and anal fin bases are longer than the female's.

Females are less colorful, with grey or green bodies with semi-transparent scales. Instead of banding on the fins, females exhibit a few oval-shaped spots on the frontal plane, between the anal fin and mid body.

== Controversy in Identification ==
There has been controversy regarding the taxonomic classification of a similar-looking fish, Characodon audax. The divergence of these two species occurred about 1.4 mya. The genus Characodon as a whole is estimated to have diverged 15.5 mya, making it the oldest branch of the family Goodeidae. To differentiate the two species, the mitochondrial cytochrome b gene and d-loop are often used.

== Reproduction ==
C. lateralis uses internal fertilization and is distinct from many other fish for displaying viviparity and matrotrophy. This means that the female keeps the embryo inside her body and gives birth to free-swimming offspring. Sexual maturity is reached after 5 months in females. The offspring are born live, ranging in 5-20 fry in each birth. The average length of gestation is 55 days. Nutrients to the offspring are provided by a structure similar to a placenta.

== Habitat ==
The rainbow goodeid is typically found in freshwater, shallow springs or marshes with little to no current and plentiful submerged vegetation. It is sensitive to change in its habitat, and susceptible to the invasive species continually being introduced into its environment. They are endemic to northern Mexico, in the Durango and Coahuila regions. They prefer a pH range of 6.0-8.0 and a dH of 9-19. Their preferred temperature and latitude range is 18°C-27°C and 24°N-23°N, respectively. Clear to turbid water is ideal for this species, with a substrate consisting of sand, mud, silt, clay, rocks, or a marl bed. Most of their time is spent near the bed of the pond or stream. They do not migrate.

The species is endemic to a relatively small area, being native to few bodies of water in Durango, Mexico. They have been found in the Abraham Gonzalez spring, around the El Salto waterfall on the Rio Tunal River, Los Berros, distributaries of the upper Rio Mezquital River, springs connected to Laguna El Toboso, and a private property in La Constancia. However, there may be locations in more remote areas that have not been surveyed. Many of the springs that they inhabit have dried up or been overcrowded with invasive species, so the number of suitable locations has been decreasing.

== Diet ==
These fish are herbivores, mostly feeding on algae. They prefer springs with heavy submerged vegetation.

== Conservation efforts and Threats ==
The species was last assessed by the IUCN Red List of Threatened Species on April 18, 2018, and are critically endangered. In 1979, they were deemed threatened. The population is currently in decline. They face multiple major threats including the introduction of invasive species, pollution, agricultural runoff, urban sewage, disturbance from recreational activities, dams/ water management, disease, and climate change. It is not sought out for human consumption or trade.

Climate change has been detrimental to C.lateralis populations. Due to the nature of them inhabiting such shallow bodies of water, the ponds and springs often dry up. It is estimated that there has been a 65% decrease in geographic range.

Invasive species have also been a major inhibitor of growth for the populations. In surveys, researchers have found predatory species that either kill the fish or increase competition for resources. Crayfish (Procambarus clarkii), Tilapia (Oreochromis neloticus), and Green Swordtails (Xiphophorus hellerii) are major competitors. The introduction of these non-native species has been largely by human intervention.

There are currently no major organized conservation efforts in place. There has been some effort from some zoos and aquariums, however it has not sufficiently increased the population to prevent extinction. A university in Morelia, Mexico, Laboratorio de Biología Acuatica in Michoacán University, has begun breeding programs in captivity to aid the species. The actual size of the population is unknown, greatly due to difficulty in surveying.

Although it is not an organized effort, the fish is sometimes bred by private tropical fish hobbyists.
