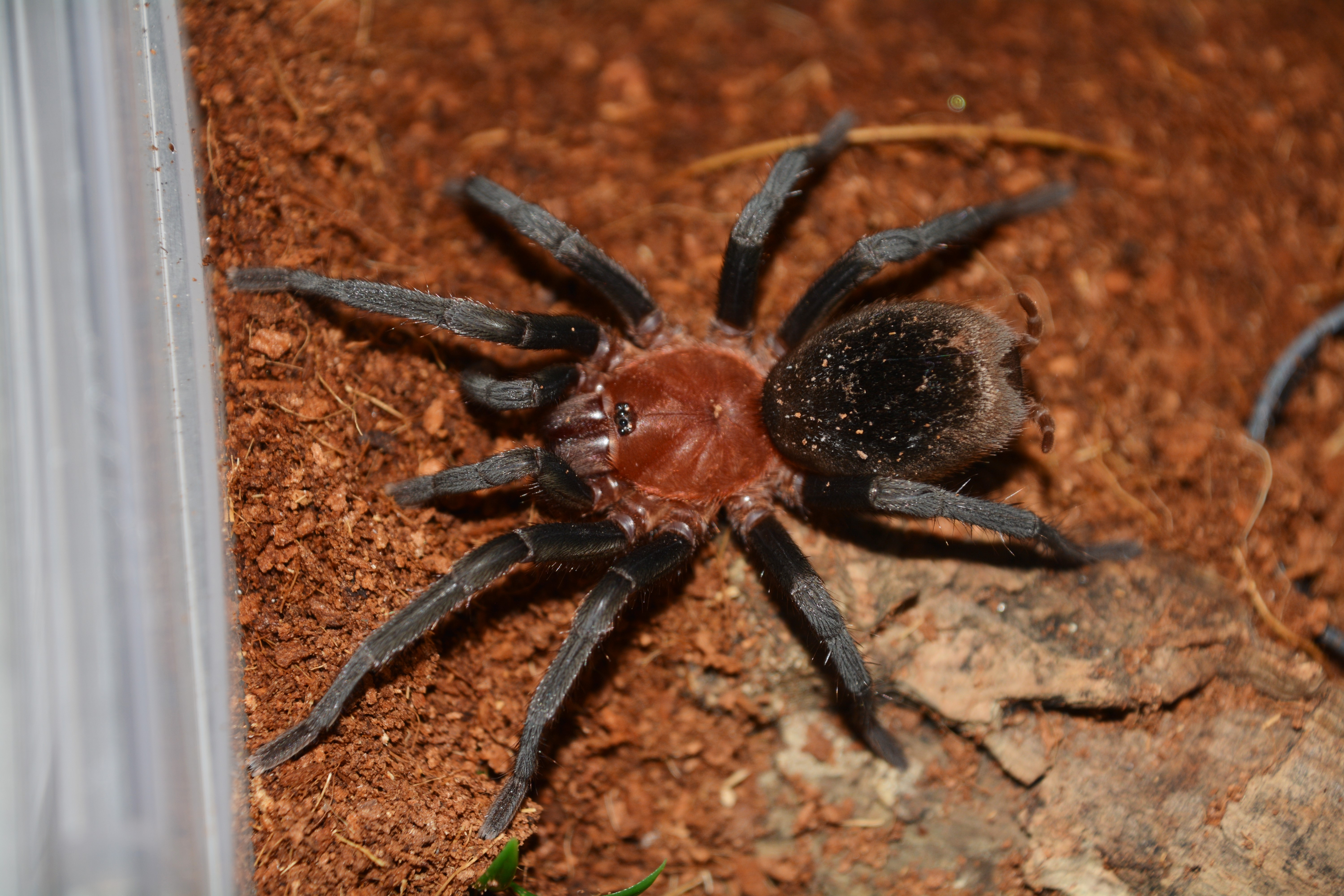

Scientific classification
- Kingdom: Animalia
- Phylum: Arthropoda
- Subphylum: Chelicerata
- Class: Arachnida
- Order: Araneae
- Infraorder: Mygalomorphae
- Family: Theraphosidae
- Genus: Bumba
- Species: B. horrida

Binomial name
- Bumba horrida (Schmidt, 1994)

= Bumba horrida =

Species of spider

Bumba horrida is a medium-large species of tarantula (about five inches (13 cm)) found in northern Brazil, like the three other species in its small genus. It is thought to be rather shy, and was discovered relatively recently.

== Natural history ==
Like all tarantulas, the horrida's ancestors diverged from a common ancestor with the normal, web-spinning spider perhaps 350 million years ago.

This spider is shares its genus to the tiny (1-inch-long (2.5 cm)) b. lennoni, the John Lennon tarantula, and has many traits that imply it is closely related to Theraphosa blondi the Goliath birdeater spider, largest known extant spider species
