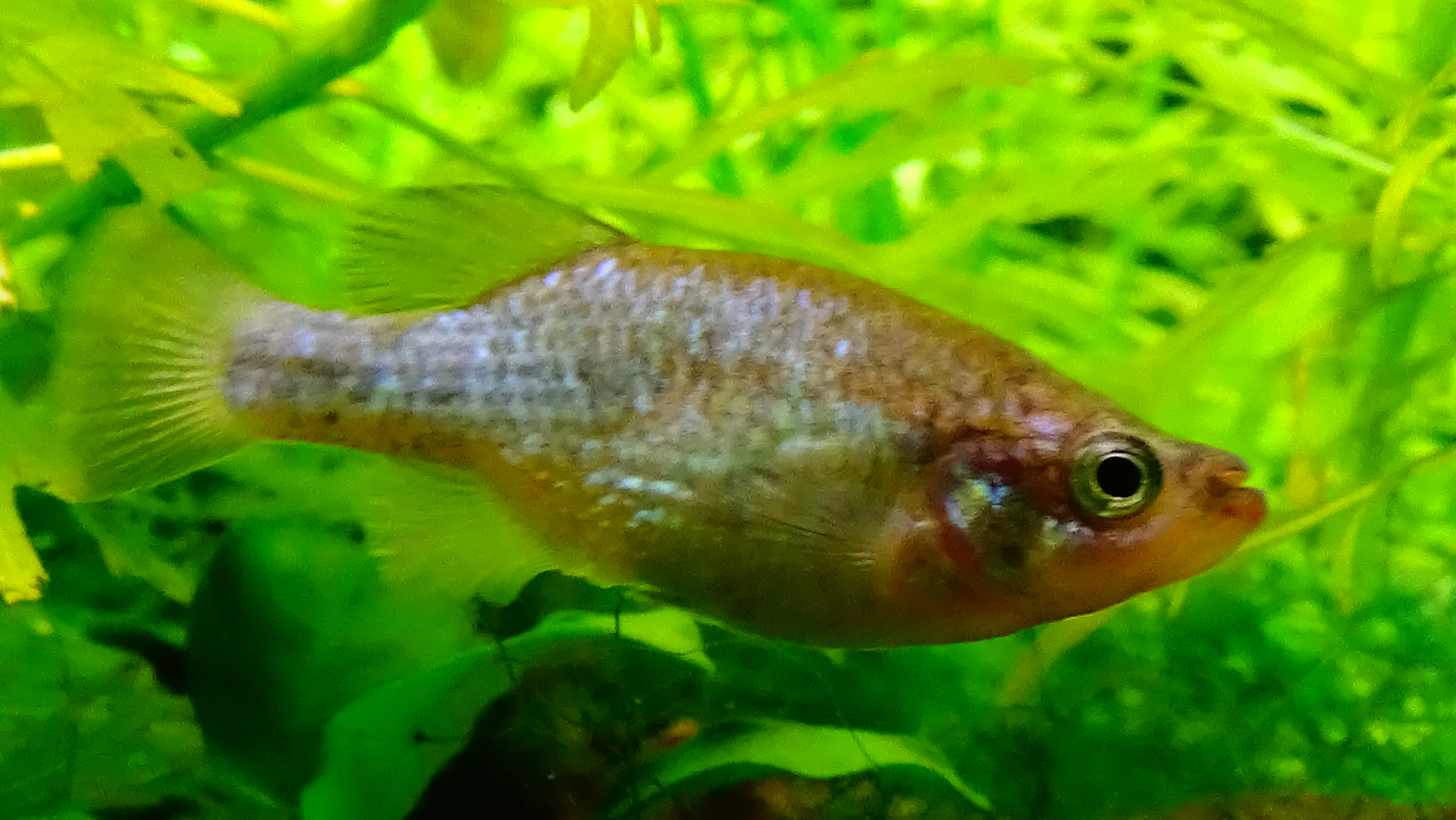

Conservation status
- Endangered (IUCN 3.1)

Scientific classification
- Kingdom: Animalia
- Phylum: Chordata
- Class: Actinopterygii
- Order: Cyprinodontiformes
- Family: Goodeidae
- Subfamily: Goodeinae
- Genus: Xenoophorus; C. L. Hubbs & C. L. Turner, 1939
- Species: X. captivus

Binomial name
- Xenoophorus captivus (C. L. Hubbs, 1924)

Synonyms
- Goodea captiva Hubbs 1924

= Relict splitfin =

Species of fish

The relict splitfin (Xenoophorus captivus) is a species of splitfin endemic to the Pánuco River system in Mexico. It feeds on algae. This species grows to up to 6 centimetres (2.4 in) in length. It is found in the aquarium trade. It is the only known member of its genus.
