= Xenotaenia =

Xenotaenia resolanae

Conservation status
- Vulnerable (IUCN 3.1)

Scientific classification
- Kingdom: Animalia
- Phylum: Chordata
- Class: Actinopterygii
- Division: Teleostei
- Order: Cyprinodontiformes
- Family: Goodeidae
- Subfamily: Goodeinae
- Genus: Xenotaenia; C. L. Turner, 1946
- Species: X. resolanae

Binomial name
- Xenotaenia resolanae C. L. Turner, 1946

Species of fish

Xenotaenia resolanae, the leopard splitfin, is a species of splitfin endemic to west–central Mexico where it is found in the Purificación and Marabasco River basins in Jalisco and Colima. This species grows to a length of 5 centimetres (2.0 in) TL. It is found in the aquarium trade and is the only known species in its genus.
