= Goodea gracilis =

Scientific classification
- Kingdom: Animalia
- Phylum: Chordata
- Class: Actinopterygii
- Order: Cyprinodontiformes
- Family: Goodeidae
- Genus: Goodea
- Species: G. gracilis

Binomial name
- Goodea gracilis C. L. Hubbs & C. L. Turner, 1939

Species of fish

Goodea gracilis, with the common name: dusky splitfin, is a species of freshwater fish in the family Goodeidae.

It is endemic to the Pánuco River system in central−eastern Mexico.

It grows to 12 cm (4.7 in) total length.
