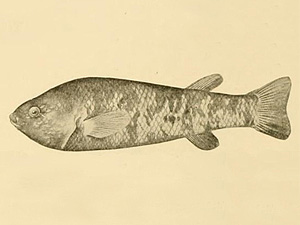

Conservation status
- Extinct (early 1950s) (IUCN 3.1)

- Presumed Extinct (early 1950s) (NatureServe)

Scientific classification
- Kingdom: Animalia
- Phylum: Chordata
- Class: Actinopterygii
- Order: Cyprinodontiformes
- Family: Goodeidae
- Genus: Empetrichthys
- Species: †E. merriami

Binomial name
- †Empetrichthys merriami C. H. Gilbert, 1893

= Ash Meadows killifish =

Species of fish

The Ash Meadows killifish (Empetrichthys merriami) is a species of killifish from the subfamily Empetrichthyinae, part of the family Goodeidae, which was first documented by C. H. Gilbert in 1893 and historically occupied numerous springs near Ash Meadows, Nye County, Nevada, United States. This species was last seen in 1948 and is believed to have gone extinct in the early 1950s, likely as a result of habitat alteration and competition with and predation by introduced crayfish Procambarus clarkii, mosquitofish (Gambusia affinis), black mollies (Poecilia sphenops), and bullfrogs (Rana catesbeiana).

The common name of the genus Empetrichthys has since been changed from killifish to poolfish.

The specific name honours the American naturalist and physician C. Hart Merriam (1855–1942), who led the Death Valley (California, USA) expedition, during which he and Vernon Orlando Bailey (1864–1942) co-collected the type.
