= Bumba tapajos =

Scientific classification
- Kingdom: Animalia
- Phylum: Arthropoda
- Subphylum: Chelicerata
- Class: Arachnida
- Order: Araneae
- Infraorder: Mygalomorphae
- Family: Theraphosidae
- Genus: Bumba
- Species: B. tapajos

Binomial name
- Bumba tapajos Lucas, Passanha & Brescovit, 2020

Species of tarantula

Bumba tapajos is a tarantula in the genus Bumba. It was first described by Lucas, Passanha and Brescovit in 2020. The species is named after where it was found, in the Tapajós area in Brazil.

== Description ==
Its color has only been described in ethanol. The cephalothorax and legs are red brown, the abdomen dorsally black and ventrally grayish. Its male palpal bulb has the embolus shorter than the tegulum.

== Habitat ==
The tarantula lives near the tapajos river in the Tapajós National Forest, where its mainly rainforest. In this area average annual rainfall is 1,820 millimetres, and the temperatures range from 21 to 31 °C. The forest along the banks of the Tapajós has elevations of about 100m above sea level. Further from the river the forest is on the Tapajós-Xingu plateau, with elevations of 120m to 170m above sea level.
