= Amatlan chub =

Conservation status
- Endangered (IUCN 3.1)

Scientific classification
- Kingdom: Animalia
- Phylum: Chordata
- Class: Actinopterygii
- Order: Cypriniformes
- Family: Leuciscidae
- Subfamily: Pogonichthyinae
- Genus: Yuriria
- Species: Y. amatlana

Binomial name
- Yuriria amatlana Domínguez-Domínguez, Pompa-Domínguez & Doadrio, 2007

Species of fish

The Amatlan chub (Yuriria amatlana) is a species of freshwater ray-finned fish belonging to the family Leuciscidae, the shiners, daces and minnows. This fish is endemic to the Ameca River basin in Mexico.
