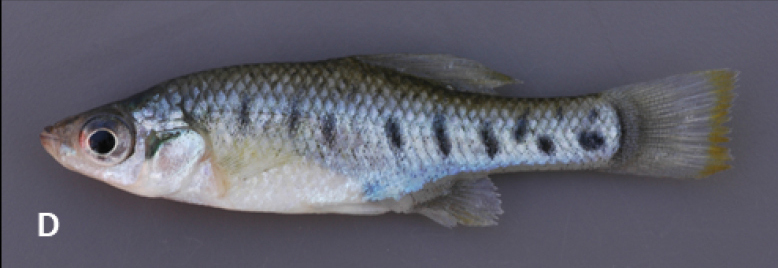
- Charcodon encaustus

Scientific classification
- Kingdom: Animalia
- Phylum: Chordata
- Class: Actinopterygii
- Order: Cyprinodontiformes
- Family: Goodeidae
- Subfamily: Goodeinae
- Genus: Chapalichthys; Meek, 1902

Type species
- Characodon encaustus Jordan & Snyder, 1899

= Chapalichthys =

Genus of fishes

Chapalichthys is a genus of splitfins that are endemic to west-central Mexico, where found in lakes, pools, ponds and channels in the Lerma–Chapala–Grande de Santiago and Balsas basins. Chapalichthys reach up to 9.3 cm (3.7 in) in standard length. Despite this relatively small size, they are often caught as food in Lake Chapala.

== Species ==
There are currently three species in this genus according to FishBase, but some authorities only recognize two, treating C. peraticus as a junior synonym of C. pardalis.

- Chapalichthys encaustus (D. S. Jordan & Snyder, 1899) (Barred splitfin)
- Chapalichthys pardalis Álvarez, 1963 (Polka-dot splitfin)
- Chapalichthys peraticus Álvarez, 1963 (Alien splitfin)
