= Alloophorus =

Conservation status
- Vulnerable (IUCN 3.1)

Scientific classification
- Kingdom: Animalia
- Phylum: Chordata
- Class: Actinopterygii
- Order: Cyprinodontiformes
- Family: Goodeidae
- Genus: Alloophorus; C. L. Hubbs & C. L. Turner, 1939
- Species: A. robustus

Binomial name
- Alloophorus robustus (T. H. Bean, 1892)

Synonyms
- Fundulus robustus Bean, 1892

Species of fish

The bulldog goodeid (Alloophorus robustus) is a species of goodeid. It is endemic to stagnant and slow-flowing waters in the Lerma–Chapala, Presa de San Juanico and Balsas basins in west-central and southwestern Mexico. Despite its relatively wide range, it is generally uncommon. This is possibly the most predatory goodeid, it feeding on other fish, crayfish, insects and other invertebrates. At up to at least 14.3 cm (5.6 in) in standard length, this is likely the second-largest goodeid, after Goodea atripinnis.
