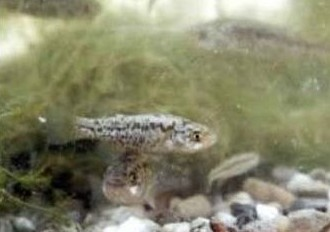
- Pahrump poolfish (E. latos)
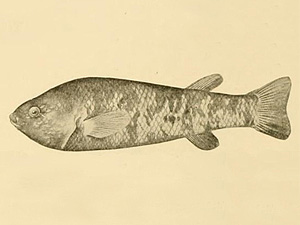
- Ash Meadows poolfish (†E. merriami)

Scientific classification
- Kingdom: Animalia
- Phylum: Chordata
- Class: Actinopterygii
- Order: Cyprinodontiformes
- Family: Goodeidae
- Subfamily: Empetrichthyinae
- Genus: Empetrichthys; C. H. Gilbert, 1893

Type species
- Empetrichthys merriami C. H. Gilbert, 1893

= Empetrichthys =

Empetrichthys Temporal range: Pliocene–present

Genus of fishes

Empetrichthys is a genus of splitfins endemic to the state of Nevada in the United States. In 1989 they only had an estimated population of 24800, while its two other subspecies had gone extinct. This species mating season typically falls in spring. These animals are in danger and facing threats because their water is drying out because of pumping of ground water for agricultural developments.

== Species ==
There are currently two recognized recent species in this genus of which only one is extant, in addition to one fossil species:

- Empetrichthys latos R. R. Miller, 1948
  - †Empetrichthys latos concavus R. R. Miller, 1948 (Raycraft Ranch poolfish)
  - Empetrichthys latos latos R. R. Miller, 1948 (Pahrump poolfish)
  - †Empetrichthys latos pahrump R. R. Miller, 1948 (Pahrump Ranch poolfish)
- †Empetrichthys merriami C. H. Gilbert, 1893 (Ash Meadows poolfish)
- †Empetrichthys erdisi (Jordan, 1924) (fossil, Miocene or Pliocene of California)
