= Raycraft Ranch killifish =

Conservation status
- Presumed Extinct (NatureServe)

Scientific classification
- Kingdom: Animalia
- Phylum: Chordata
- Class: Actinopterygii
- Order: Cyprinodontiformes
- Family: Goodeidae
- Genus: Empetrichthys
- Species: E. latos
- Subspecies: †E. l. concavus

Trinomial name
- †Empetrichthys latos concavus R. R. Miller, 1948

Subspecies of fish

The Raycraft Ranch killifish or Raycraft poolfish (Empetrichthys latos concavus), a subspecies of the killifish Empetrichthys latos, was first described in 1948. This subspecies was restricted to a single spring on the Raycraft Ranch in the Pahrump Valley of Nye County, Nevada. It became extinct, most likely late in the 1950s, as a result of groundwater extraction and the filling in of the spring, along with competition from introduced carp species.
