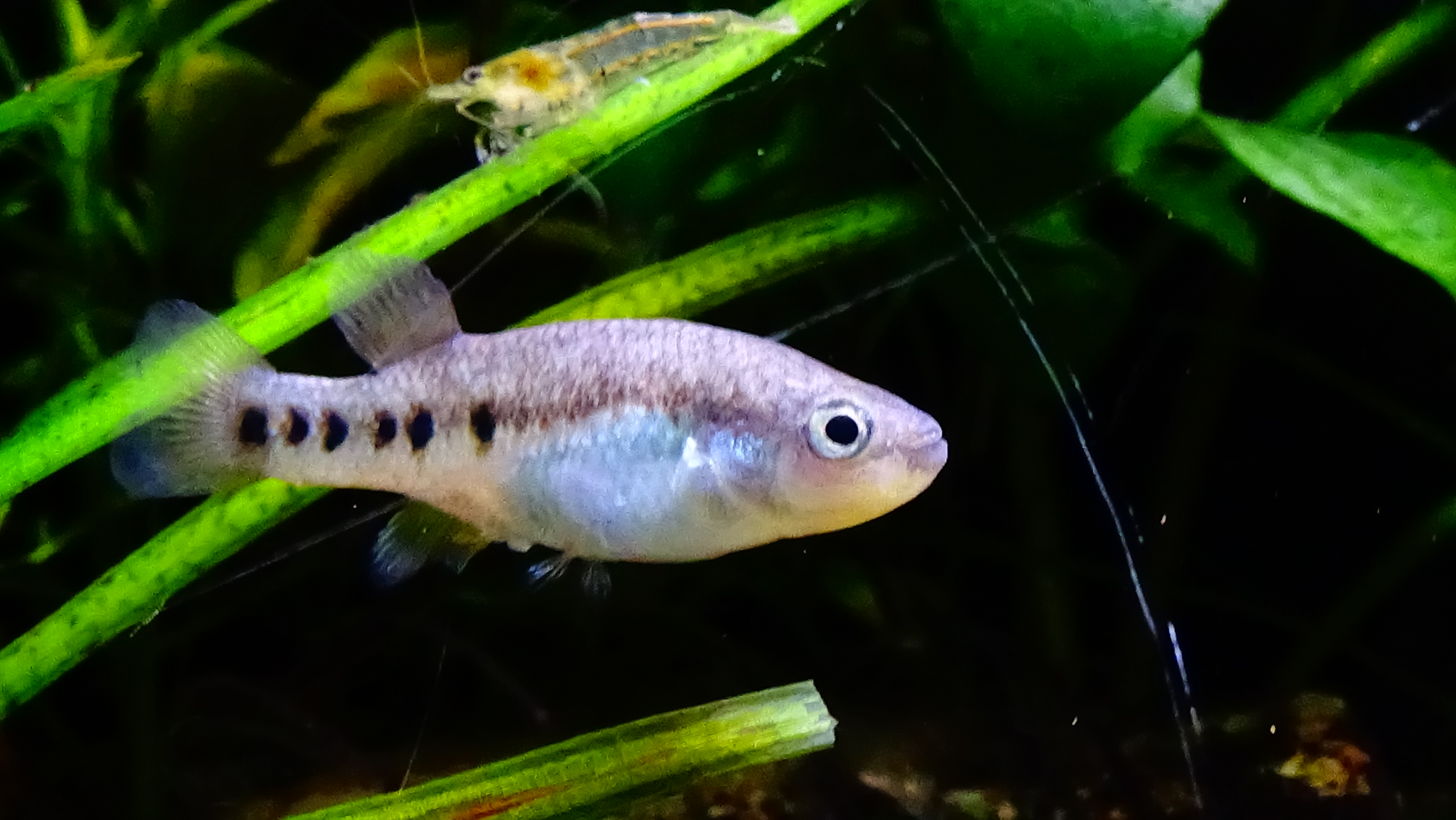
- Characodon lateralis

Scientific classification
- Kingdom: Animalia
- Phylum: Chordata
- Class: Actinopterygii
- Order: Cyprinodontiformes
- Family: Goodeidae
- Subfamily: Goodeinae
- Genus: Characodon; Günther, 1866

Type species
- Characodon lateralis Günther, 1866

= Characodon =

Genus of fishes

Characodon is a genus of splitfins endemic to north–central Mexico. Two of the species are highly threatened and restricted to pools, ponds and springs in the upper San Pedro Mezquital River basin in Durango. The third species, C. garmani, was restricted to springs near Parras in Coahuila, but it became extinct when they dried out.

== Species ==
There are currently three recognized species in this genus, although some authorities consider the genus to be monospecific, containing only Characodon lateralis with the other two species classified in the genus Goodea.

- Characodon audax M. L. Smith & R. R. Miller, 1986 (Bold characodon)
- †Characodon garmani D. S. Jordan & Evermann, 1898 (Parras characodon)
- Characodon lateralis Günther, 1866 (Rainbow characodon)

† = Extinct
