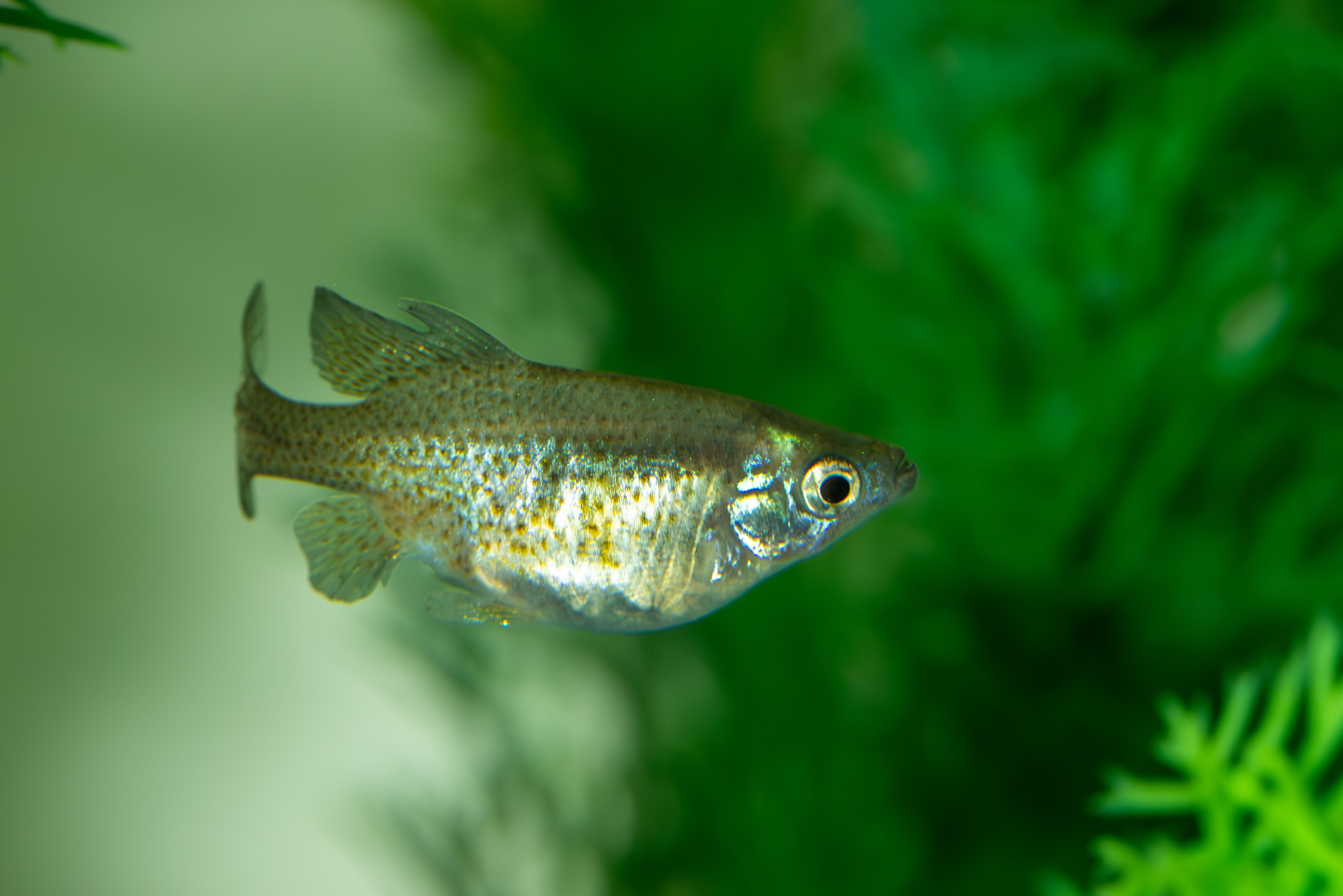

Conservation status
- Extinct in the Wild (IUCN 3.1)

Scientific classification
- Kingdom: Animalia
- Phylum: Chordata
- Class: Actinopterygii
- Order: Cyprinodontiformes
- Family: Goodeidae
- Genus: Skiffia
- Species: S. francesae

Binomial name
- Skiffia francesae Kingston, 1978

= Golden skiffia =

Species of fish

Skiffia francesae, the golden skiffia or tiro dorado, is a species of splitfin endemic to the Rio Teuchitlán, a tributary of Río Ameca in western Mexico. It is extinct in the wild, but has been maintained in aquaria and the aquarium hobbyist trade.

== Taxonomy and etymology ==
The scientific name of the golden skiffia is Skiffia francesae. It is a member of the family Goodeidae, a small but diverse group restricted to Mexico. This species was first described in the journal Copeia by Dolores Kingston, from preserved and live specimens in the University of Michigan Museum of Zoology. This species was named in honor of Frances H. Miller who, along with her husband Robert Rush Miller, helped to collect and ship the live specimens.

== Description ==
The golden skiffia is a small fish, reaching a maximum standard length (SL) of around 4.3 cm (1.7 in), with a wedge shaped head and upturned lips. It has of a row 30–35 deeply cleft outer teeth in both the upper and lower jaws. Inner teeth can be cleft or conical, and are scattered irregularly. The species shows sexual dimorphism with males having larger fins, and a greater body and head depth. Males also have a notched dorsal fin, which females lack. Males are a bright gold color with a gray overcast. The gold coloration is most vibrant during courtship, largely fading to the dorsal, caudal, and anal fins in non-courting males. Females have a greater body width, and both females and juveniles are gray-green, with scattered black flecks on their backs and along the lateral line. Females do not change color during courtship. Both sexes have a black crescent just before the tail fin.

=== Life cycle ===
Golden skiffia is ovoviviparous, giving birth to live young rather than laying eggs. The right and left ovaries are merged into a single organ, in which the young are gestated. This organ is capable of enlarging as the young develop. While in the ovary, the young possess trophotaenia. Each trophotaenia has three lobes containing blood vessels, which are believed to function in nutrient and gas exchange. Newborn young lose their trophotaenia shortly after birth. The gestation period is 55–60 days, with a usual brood size of 10–15 young.

== Ecology ==
=== Range and habitat ===
Golden skiffia has been declared extinct in the wild since 1996. Prior to extirpation, it was found in the Rio Teuchitlán, a tributary of the Río Ameca in Jalisco state, Mexico. The area of the river inhabited by golden skiffia had a slight current, with murky water and mud, sand, and silt substrate. Golden skiffia occurred at a maximum depth of 0.5 m (1.6 ft). At the time specimens were collected, shore vegetation was dominated by Acacia and Salix, while aquatic vegetation included Pistia, Ceratophyllum, Potamogeton, and water hyacinth. The shore suffers from heavy human encroachment, and the water is polluted. In 1976, an aquarium variety of platyfish, Xiphophorus maculatus was found. This introduced species was found to outnumber Golden skiffia by a factor of 50. Golden skiffia's numbers were dramatically reduced within a year, likely due to competition from X. maculatus.

Golden skiffia is likely a benthic feeder, as indicated by gut contents dominated by pennate diatoms.

=== Reintroduction ===
On 4 November 2022, a team of conservationists from Universidad Michoacana de San Nicolás de Hidalgo, Chester Zoo, and other conservation groups released approximately 1,200 golden skiffia, raised in a conservation breeding program into their native range in the Teuchitlán River. The project involved restoring the degraded habitat by removing non-native species and other threats from the river's ecosystem. The release is part of the conservation project Fish Ark Mexico that successfully reintroduced the tequila splitfin into the Teuchitlán. To prepare the individual fish for their return, fish marked for release were first placed in ponds to adapt to semi-captive conditions. From there they were dewormed and marked, before being taken to mesocosms in the river itself to experience and adapt to natural conditions prior to release. The released fish will be monitored for five years to assess population change, reproduction, and successful growth in their natural habitat.
