= Bold characodon =

Conservation status
- Endangered (IUCN 3.1)

Scientific classification
- Kingdom: Animalia
- Phylum: Chordata
- Class: Actinopterygii
- Order: Cyprinodontiformes
- Family: Goodeidae
- Genus: Characodon
- Species: C. audax

Binomial name
- Characodon audax M. L. Smith & R. R. Miller, 1986

Species of fish

The bold characodon (Characodon audax) is a species of fish in the family Goodeidae that is endemic to Mexico. Its habitat is springfed ponds and small creeks with still or slow flowing water. It can reach lengths of 48 millimetres (1.9 in).

There has been controversy regarding the taxonomic classification of this and other Characodon species; see Rainbow goodeid.
