= Jalisco chub =

Conservation status
- Endangered (IUCN 3.1)

Scientific classification
- Kingdom: Animalia
- Phylum: Chordata
- Class: Actinopterygii
- Order: Cypriniformes
- Family: Leuciscidae
- Subfamily: Pogonichthyinae
- Genus: Yuriria
- Species: Y. alta

Binomial name
- Yuriria alta (D. S. Jordan, 1880)

Synonyms
- Hudsonius altus D. S.Jordan, 1880; Notropis altus (D. S. Jordan, 1880)

Species of fish

The Jalisco chub (Yuriria alta) is a species of freshwater ray-finned fish belonging to the family Leuciscidae, the shiners, daces and minnows. This fish is endemic to Mexico.
