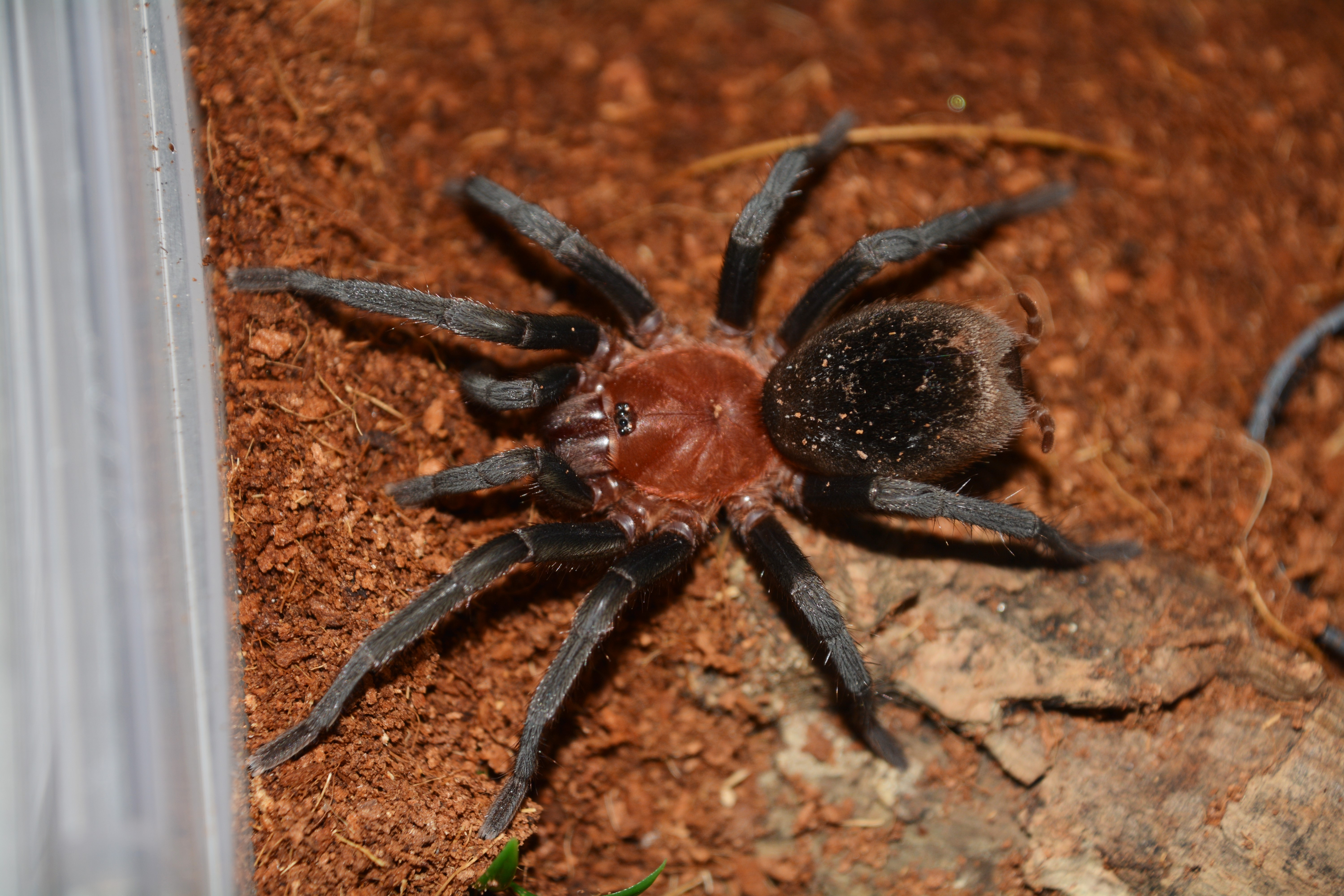
- Bumba horrida in captivity

Scientific classification
- Kingdom: Animalia
- Phylum: Arthropoda
- Subphylum: Chelicerata
- Class: Arachnida
- Order: Araneae
- Infraorder: Mygalomorphae
- Family: Theraphosidae
- Subfamily: Theraphosinae
- Genus: Bumba; Pérez-Miles, Bonaldo & Miglio, 2014

Type species
- Bumba horrida (Pérez-Miles, 2000)

Species
- 8, see text

Synonyms
- Iracema Pérez-Miles, 2000; Maraca Pérez-Miles, 2005

= Bumba (spider) =

Genus of spiders

Bumba is a genus of tarantula native to the Americas. It is an uncommon genus, comprising eight known species, including one named after John Lennon. Like most related species in the subfamily Theraphosinae, they may flick urticating hairs in response to threats.

== Diagnosis ==
They can be distinguished by the type 5 urticating hairs, and the palpal bulb resting in a "ventral distal excavation" of the pedipalp's tibia. The metatarsus number 1 passes between two branches of the tibial apophysis when flexed and the presence of spine like hairs on the maxillae and coxae 1 through 4.

== Taxonomy ==
The genus was first described in 2000 by Fernando Pérez-Miles under the name Iracema; however this name was already in use for a genus of freshwater fish, so in 2005, Pérez-Miles proposed the replacement name Maraca. However, this too was already in use (for a species of cockroach) and in 2014 the replacement name Bumba was put forward by Pérez-Miles, Bonaldo & Miglio.

=== Etymology ===
The genus name, Bumba, refers to Brazilian folk theater; in the Northern Brazilian region where the spiders are found, there is a festival called Boi-bumbá, or "beat my bull".

=== Species ===
As of July 2022, the World Spider Catalog accepted the following 8 species:

- Bumba cuiaba Lucas, Passanha & Brescovit, 2020 — Brazil
- Bumba horrida (Schmidt, 1994) — Venezuela, Brazil
- Bumba humilis (Vellard, 1924) — Brazil
- Bumba lennoni Pérez-Miles, Bonaldo & Miglio, 2014 — Brazil
- Bumba mineiros Lucas, Passanha & Brescovit, 2020 — Brazil, Paraguay
- Bumba paunaka Ferretti, 2021 — Bolivia
- Bumba rondonia Lucas, Passanha & Brescovit, 2020 — Brazil
- Bumba tapajos Lucas, Passanha & Brescovit, 2020 — Brazil

==== In synonymy ====
- Bumba cabocla (Pérez-Miles, 2000) = Bumba horrida

==== Transferred to other genera ====
- Bumba pulcherrimaklaasi (Schmidt, 1991) → Cyclosternum pulcherrimaklaasi (Nomen dubium)
