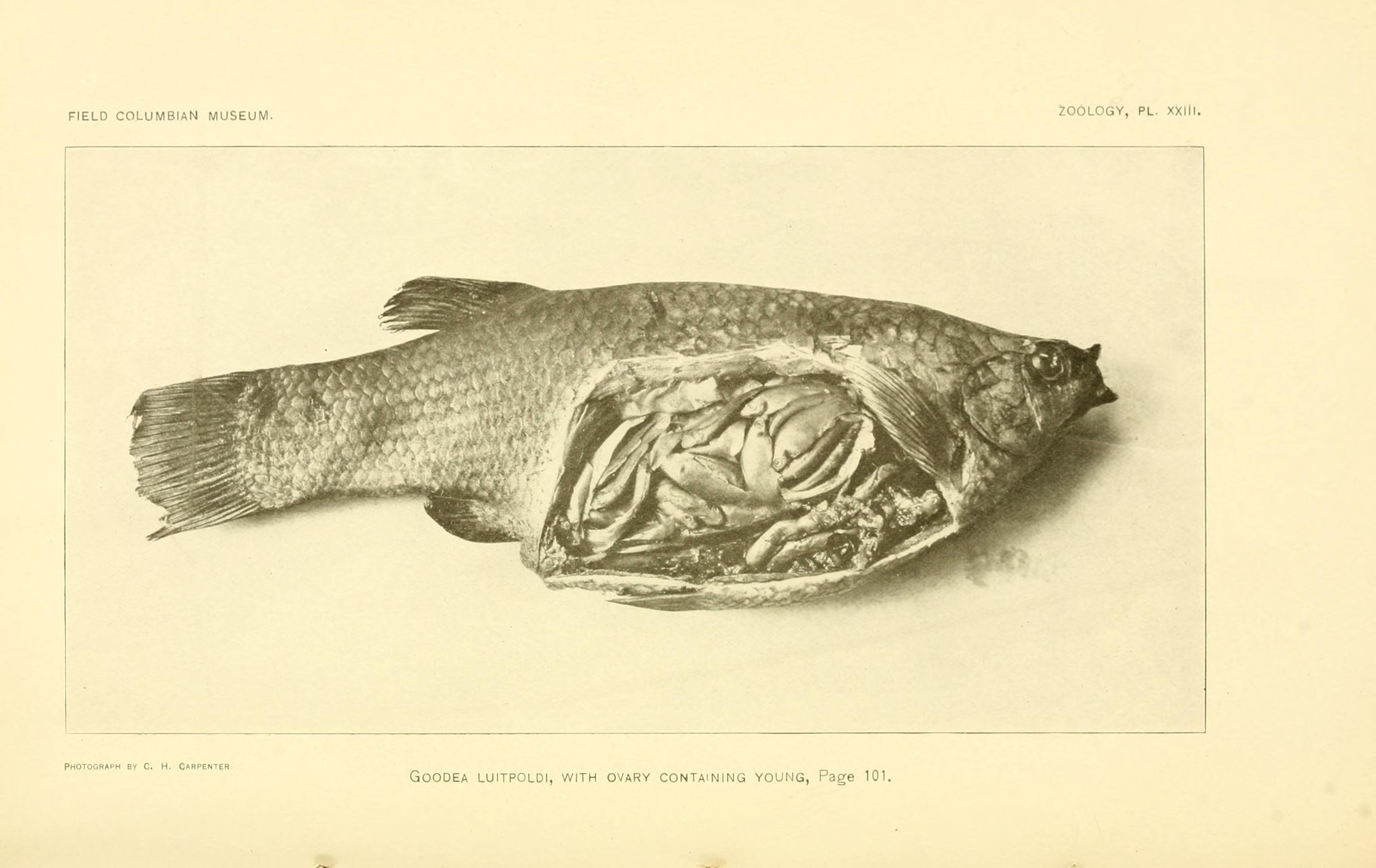
- Goodea lutipoldi

Scientific classification
- Kingdom: Animalia
- Phylum: Chordata
- Class: Actinopterygii
- Order: Cyprinodontiformes
- Family: Goodeidae
- Subfamily: Goodeinae
- Genus: Goodea; D. S. Jordan, 1880

Type species
- Goodea atripinnis D.S. Jordan, 1880

= Goodea =

Genus of fishes

Goodea is a genus of splitfins that are endemic to Mexico. They are found in a wide range of habitats in several river basins that originate in the Central Plateau, such as Pánuco, Lerma–Chapala–Grande de Santiago and Balsas. Overall this genus is among the most widespread and successful splitfins, although they also have declined and the relatively restricted G. gracilis is considered vulnerable by the IUCN. This genus includes the largests splitfins, reaching a standard length of up to 20 cm (8 in). They are primarily herbivores, but also take small organisms like tiny crustaceans and snails. The genus is named in honour of the American ichthyologist George Brown Goode (1851-1896).

== Species ==
Three species are typically recognized in this genus, but the taxonomy is disputed and some only recognize G. atripinnis (in which case the other two are junior synonyms).

- Goodea atripinnis D. S. Jordan, 1880 (Blackfin Goodea)
- Goodea gracilis C. L. Hubbs & C. L. Turner, 1939 (Dusky splitfin)
- Goodea luitpoldii (Steindachner, 1894) (Green goodea)
