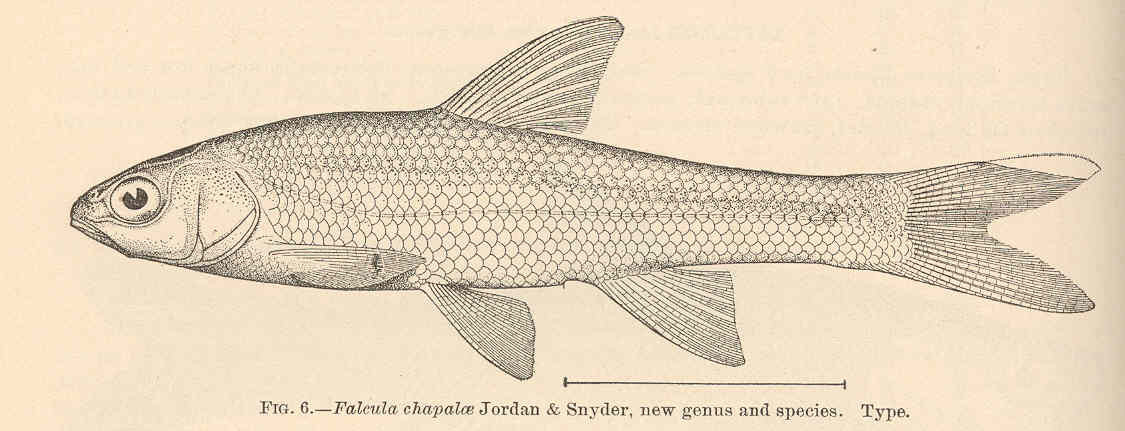

Conservation status
- Endangered (IUCN 3.1)

Scientific classification
- Kingdom: Animalia
- Phylum: Chordata
- Class: Actinopterygii
- Order: Cypriniformes
- Family: Leuciscidae
- Subfamily: Pogonichthyinae
- Genus: Yuriria
- Species: Y. chapalae

Binomial name
- Yuriria chapalae (Jordan & Snyder, 1899)

= Chapala chub =

Species of fish

The Chapala chub (Yuriria chapalae) is a species of freshwater ray-finned fish belonging to the family Leuciscidae, the shiners, daces and minnows. This fish is endemic to the Lake Chapala and its effluent river, the Río Grande de Santiago, in the states of Jalisco and Michoacán in Mexico.
