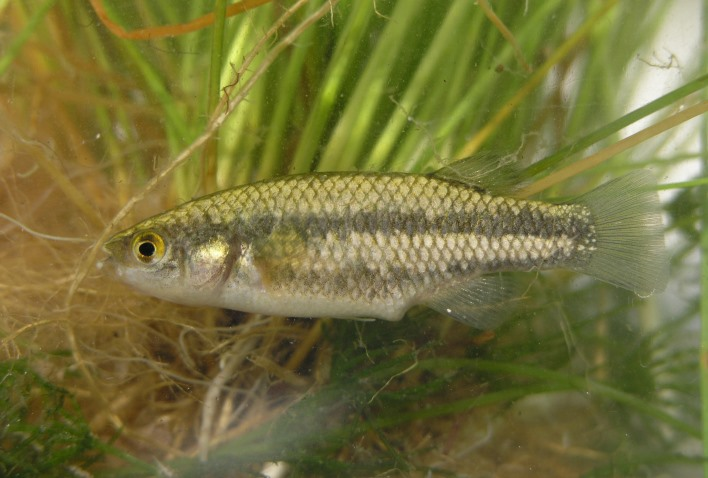
- Crenichthys baileyi

Scientific classification
- Kingdom: Animalia
- Phylum: Chordata
- Class: Actinopterygii
- Order: Cyprinodontiformes
- Family: Goodeidae
- Subfamily: Empetrichthyinae
- Genus: Crenichthys; C. L. Hubbs, 1932

Type species
- Crenichthys nevadae Hubbs, 1932

= Crenichthys =

Genus of fishes

Crenichthys is a genus of fish in the subfamily Empetrichthyinae which is part of the family Goodeidae, the splitfins. This small genus consists of two species which are both endemic to Nevada in the United States. They occur in small populations in isolated warm springs. Fish of this genus are known commonly as springfish.

Distinctive characteristics include the loss of the pelvic fins, a relatively large anal fin and one or two rows of black spots along each side.

== Species ==
The two recognized species in this genus:

- Crenichthys baileyi (C. H. Gilbert, 1893)
  - Crenichthys baileyi albivallis J. E. Williams & G. R. Wilde, 1981 – Preston White River springfish
  - Crenichthys baileyi baileyi (C. H. Gilbert, 1893) – White River springfish
  - Crenichthys baileyi grandis J. E. Williams & G. R. Wilde, 1981 – Hiko White River springfish
  - Crenichthys baileyi moapae J. E. Williams & G. R. Wilde, 1981 – Moapa White River springfish
  - Crenichthys baileyi thermophilus J. E. Williams & G. R. Wilde, 1981 – Mormon White River springfish
- Crenichthys nevadae C. L. Hubbs, 1932 – Railroad Valley springfish
