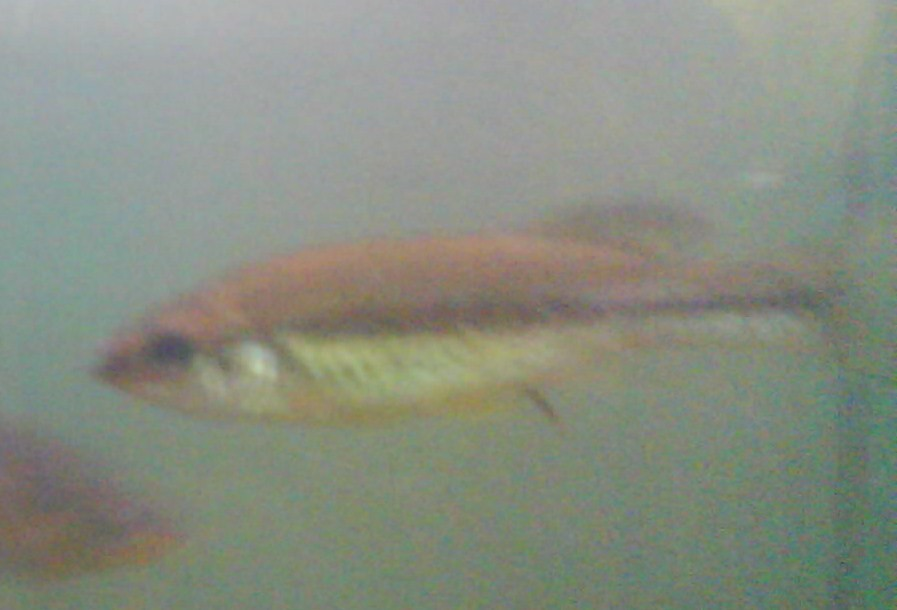

Conservation status
- Least Concern (IUCN 3.1)

Scientific classification
- Kingdom: Animalia
- Phylum: Chordata
- Class: Actinopterygii
- Order: Cyprinodontiformes
- Family: Goodeidae
- Genus: Ilyodon
- Species: I. whitei

Binomial name
- Ilyodon whitei (Meek, 1904)

Synonyms
- Goodea whitei Meek, 1904; Balsadichthys whitei (Meek, 1904)

= Ilyodon whitei =

Species of fish

The Balsas splitfin (Ilyodon whitei) is a species of fish in the family Goodeidae. It is endemic to Mexico where it occurs in the states of Morelos and Michoacán. This fish was formally described as Goodea whitei by Seth Eugene Meek in 1904 with the type locality given as Yautepec in Morelos. The specific name honours E. A. White of the Interoceanic Railway of Mexico for his interest in and support of Meek's work.
