= Parras characodon =

Conservation status
- Extinct (2019) (IUCN 3.1)

Scientific classification
- Kingdom: Animalia
- Phylum: Chordata
- Class: Actinopterygii
- Order: Cyprinodontiformes
- Family: Goodeidae
- Genus: Characodon
- Species: †C. garmani

Binomial name
- †Characodon garmani D. S. Jordan & Evermann, 1898

Species of fish

The Parras characodon (Characodon garmani) is a species of goodeid fish once endemic to Coahuila, Mexico. Its natural habitats were destroyed between 1900 and 1953, and no records have been made in the last century; it is considered extinct, although the validity of this taxon and where the actual type locality is are subject to some doubt. The specific name honours the American herpetologist and ichthyologist Samuel Garman (1843–1927).
