= Bumba lennoni =

Scientific classification
- Kingdom: Animalia
- Phylum: Arthropoda
- Subphylum: Chelicerata
- Class: Arachnida
- Order: Araneae
- Infraorder: Mygalomorphae
- Family: Theraphosidae
- Genus: Bumba
- Species: B. lennoni

Binomial name
- Bumba lennoni Pérez-Miles, Bonaldo & Miglio, 2014

Species of spider

Bumba lennoni is a species of tarantula found in 2015 in Caxiuanã National Forest. It is about one inch long, small for a tarantula but is closely related to the largest spider in the world.

== Origins ==
This spider lives in northern Brazil, and is named after John Lennon "the legendary creator of The Beatles, who contributed to make this world a gentler place".

Like all tarantulas, the lennon tarantula's ancestors diverged from a common ancestor with the normal, web-spinning spider perhaps 350 million years ago.

== Biology ==
Though very small (about 1 inch), this tarantula shares its genus with relatively large b. horrida, with a five-inch legspan, and has many traits that imply it is closely related to Theraphosa blondi the Goliath birdeater spider, largest known extant spider species

== See also ==
- Ilyodon lennoni
- List of organisms named after famous people (born 1925–1949)
