= Goodea atripinnis =

Conservation status
- Least Concern (IUCN 3.1)

Scientific classification
- Kingdom: Animalia
- Phylum: Chordata
- Class: Actinopterygii
- Order: Cyprinodontiformes
- Family: Goodeidae
- Genus: Goodea
- Species: G. atripinnis

Binomial name
- Goodea atripinnis Jordan, 1880

Species of fish

Goodea atripinnis, the blackfin goodea, is a species of killifish from the family Goodeidae. This species was described by David Starr Jordan in 1880 with the type locality given as León, Guanajuato in Mexico. This species occurs as a native in nine Mexican federal states and has been introduced to Durango and Mexico City. It has the largest distribution range of any species within the family Goodeidae, its range extending from Hidalgo in the east to Nayarit in the west and from Michoacán in the south to Zacatecas in the north.
