= Striped goodeid =

Conservation status
- Endangered (IUCN 3.1)

Scientific classification
- Kingdom: Animalia
- Phylum: Chordata
- Class: Actinopterygii
- Order: Cyprinodontiformes
- Family: Goodeidae
- Genus: Ataeniobius; C. L. Hubbs & C. L. Turner, 1939
- Species: A. toweri

Binomial name
- Ataeniobius toweri (Meek, 1904)

Synonyms
- Goodea toweri Meek, 1904

Species of fish

The striped goodeid, bluetail goodeid or bluetail goodea (Ataeniobius toweri) is an endangered species of fish in the family Goodeidae. Its genus Ataeniobius is monotypic. It is endemic to the Río Verde and associated waters, including the Media Luna and Los Anteojitos lakes (all part of the Pánuco River basin), in San Luis Potosí, Mexico. The specific name of this fish honours its discoverer, the America evolutionary biologist William Lawrence Tower (1872–1955) of the University of Chicago.
