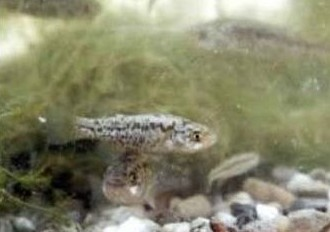
- Empetrichthys latos

Scientific classification
- Kingdom: Animalia
- Phylum: Chordata
- Class: Actinopterygii
- Order: Cyprinodontiformes
- Family: Goodeidae
- Subfamily: Empetrichthyinae; Jordan, Evermann & Clark, 1930

= Empetrichthyinae =

Empetrichthyinae Temporal range: Pliocene–present

Subfamily of fishes

Empetrichthyinae is a subfamily of fishes, one of two subfamilies that make up the family Goodeidae.

The earliest fossil empetrichthyine is Empetrichthys erdisi from the Miocene or Pliocene of California.

== Genera ==
There are two genera within the subfamily Empetrichthyinae:

- Crenichthys Hubbs, 1932
- Empetrichthys Gilbert, 1893
