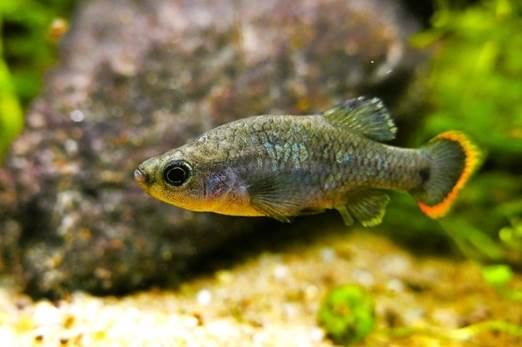

Conservation status
- Endangered (IUCN 3.1)

Scientific classification
- Kingdom: Animalia
- Phylum: Chordata
- Class: Actinopterygii
- Order: Cyprinodontiformes
- Family: Goodeidae
- Genus: Zoogoneticus
- Species: Z. tequila

Binomial name
- Zoogoneticus tequila Webb & Miller, 1998
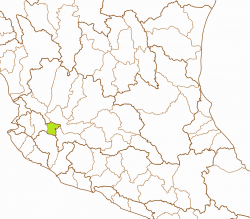
- Distribution map for Zoogoneticus tequila

= Zoogoneticus tequila =

Tequila Splitfin

Zoogoneticus tequila, Tequila splitfin or simply Tequila fish, is a species of goodeid fish (family Goodeidae) from Mexico. Viviparous topminnows make up 36 of the species within it this family. Z. tequila, one of these 36 species, has a very limited population endemic to Mexico. The specific epithet, tequila, derives from the Tequila Volcano, which looms near the type locality.

== Distribution ==
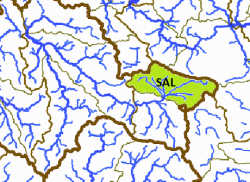
Geographic range map of Z. tequila: Presa La Vega-Cocula basin from the Hydrographic Region Ameca on a Mexico map (left), the Río Salado subbasin (SAL) on the right. Source: Zoogoneticus Tequila. Goodeid Working Group. (n.d.).

Zoogoneticus tequila is endemic to the Ameca River basin in west-central Mexico. Its current distribution is restricted to a single spring pool in Teuchitlán, only 4 metres (13 ft) in diameter, where a population consisting of less than 50 adult fish found in the early 2000s. Before the discovery of the pool population in 2000/2001, Z. tequila was generally thought to inhabit rivers; However, no fish could be found in the original habitat and the species was considered extinct in the wild. Introduced fish species have been implicated in the disappearance of Z. tequila from its type locality.

The small pool where the endemic population of Z. tequila currently inhabits is made of mostly mud and silt, along with rocks, sand, and minimal vegetation. The fish are primarily found in more shallow depths within the pool, preferring warmer temperatures. After reintroduction efforts for seven years, the Z. tequila population has recovered and now flourishes in its endemic location. The Ameca River Basin is home to many endemic species that fall within the Goodeidae family, but like Z. tequila, most remain outnumbered by introduced species such as the guppy. With such a small population of minimal juveniles and a few adults, Z. tequila was particularly threatened by inbreeding and poor genetic variation, ultimately facing the threat of extinction before any reintroduction efforts were made. Additionally, introduced species that drive competition up to a nearly impossible level for this fish is another factor attributed to the initial population decline.

== Description ==
Along with other Mexican goodeids, Zoogoneticus tequila are viviparous; this led the genus to be originally included in family Poeciliidae. The clutch size is up to 29 young. Males are smaller than females, with standard length up to 4.1 cm (1.6 in) in males and up to 5.8 cm (2.3 in) in females. The clutch size is up to 29 young. Total length can reach 7 cm (2.8 in) in females. The sexes can also be distinguished by colouration. Adult males have cream-colored terminal bands on the anal and dorsal fin. The caudal fin of adult males has crescent-shaped band of red-orange, orange, or yellow. This crescent-shaped tail is one of the distinguishing features that helps to separate this fish from the other species within its genus: Zoogoneticus quitzeoensis. The rest of the caudal fin is not pigmented and is transparent. Some large adult females share this caudal coloration but generally their caudal fins are transparent. Both sexes display olive shaded, mottled bodies with males typically darker than the females. Generally, adults will lose the mottled coloration in their caudal peduncle as they age. Juveniles are lighter colored with more obvious mottling.

== Reproduction ==
The female Z. tequila fish have a single, median ovary that is common amongst the entire Goodeidae family. During reproduction, the embryos develop in the cavity of this ovary. Females give birth to free-swimming fry after the development within the ovary cavity. During each brood, females will produce 10-29 offspring, typically during the summer season, though some studies have found females to reproduce in winter in rare occurrences. Once the fry are given birth to, they are left to fend for themselves, with no parental care provided by the mother. Sexual maturity for this species is reached around 6-10 weeks of age, when the life cycle of this fish starts over again.

== Diet ==
Much of the wild diet and eating patterns of Z. tequila are inferred from congeners such as Z. quitzeoensis, which consists of amphipods, insects, ostracods, and detritus. In their existing location in the spring pool, Z. tequila fish typically eat various zooplankton and insect larvae, with chironomid larvae being most popular. The conical teeth that can be found on this fish imply it is a predator that hunts small invertebrates or larvae in the wild, though wild populations aren’t attainable to observe due to their extinction outside of the pool. There have also been recorded instances of cannibalism of the immature young.

== Predation ==
Typical predators endemic in the geographic range are Esox sp. and Thamnophis sp. There are also many introduced species in the area that likely prey on or outcompeted Z. tequila such as Xiphophorus maculatus, Tilapia aurea, Lepomis macrochirus, Cyprinus carpio, X. helleri and Poecilia reticulata. The singular pool that the Z. tequila is found in consists of 80% exotic species, and 50% twospot livebearers, or Pseudoxiphophorus bimaculatus. This invasive species is one of the main threats that studies have shown to decrease the population and viability of the Z. tequila. When surrounded by more native species, Z. tequila has historically shown a higher abundance than when surrounded by invasive species such as these predators.

== Conservation status ==
After a few successful reintroductions of Z. tequila in the wild became established, the International Union for Conservation of Nature declared this species endangered. However, it is still considered by many to be extinct in the wild. DNA analysis of natural populations of Z. tequila have shown that because the populations are extremely small, there is a large amount of inbreeding which could be contributing to the precipitous decline in populations in the wild. Ideally, the process to recover the Z. tequila even further would be to introduce subjects from the wild to the very limited, endemic population of the river. Since the wild population was declared extinct nearly twenty years ago, this opportunity is nonexistent. Instead of using species from the wild, recent efforts by scientists beginning in 1998 have been able to replenish the declining population within the river through breeding the fish in labs. To do this, Z. tequila fish that were bred by scientists were reintroduced into the river in intervals, with 1,500 fish being released into the river in total. This project came from the collaboration of zoologists from Chester Zoo and European institutions, ultimately creating a lab with Mexican scientists to bring this species to recovery.

Beyond simply reintroducing the species and allowing a larger population to reach replenishment, it is also important to consider the causes behind the endangered species to begin with. Freshwater fish particularly face a large threat of extinction due to the proportionally higher rate of endemic species in these regions. It is difficult to understand the complexity of the threats since this species is not largely studied. However, the research that has been done to understand the cause of the Z. tequila going extinct in the wild largely attributes anthropogenic pollution as well as the introduction of invasive species to be the largest reasons. Having an environment in which the minimal, endemic population can grow past a point where inbreeding poses a significant threat is a main driver in recent efforts.
