= Ameca River =

River in Mexico

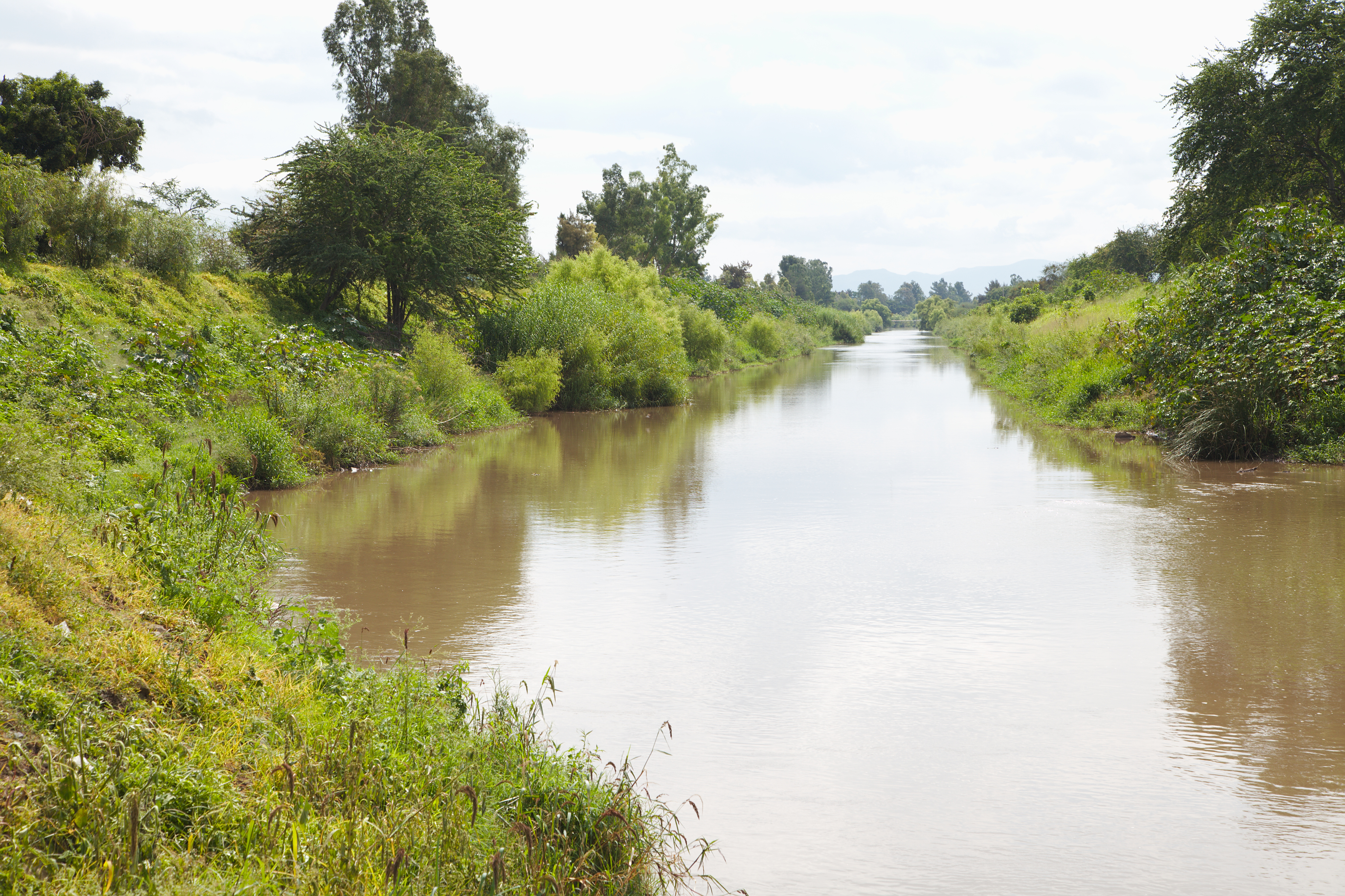
- View of the Ameca River

- Location of mouth

Location
- Country: Mexico
- State: Jalisco

Physical characteristics
- Mouth
  - coordinates: 20°40′21″N 105°16′52″W
- Length: 230 km (140 mi)

The Ameca River (Spanish: Río Ameca) is a river of some 230 km (140 mi) in length in western Mexico. It originates in the Bosque de la Primavera in Jalisco, 23 km to the west of state capital Guadalajara; flows through the city of Ameca; and then forms the boundary between Jalisco and Nayarit on its way to the Pacific Ocean, where it drains into the Bahía de Banderas at Puerto Vallarta, Jalisco. Its main tributaries are the Ahuacatlán and Amatlán de Cañas.

The Ameca has been dammed just north of the town of La Vega, Jalisco, forming a reservoir, the Lago La Vega which extends northward to the town of Teuchitlán.

== Fish ==
Several species of fish are only found in the Ameca River basin: the butterfly splitfin, Tequila splitfin, finescale splitfin, banded allotoca, golden skiffia, Amatlan chub, Ameca chub and Ameca shiner. All these are highly threatened.

The Tequila splitfin, finescale splitfin and golden skiffia are likely already extinct in the wild; but all three survive in captivity. The butterfly splitfin and banded allotoca were also thought to be extinct in the wild, but have since been rediscovered. The Ameca shiner was once feared entirely extinct, but it too survives in captivity. A reintroduction project for the shiner and Tequila splitfin was initiated in 2015.
