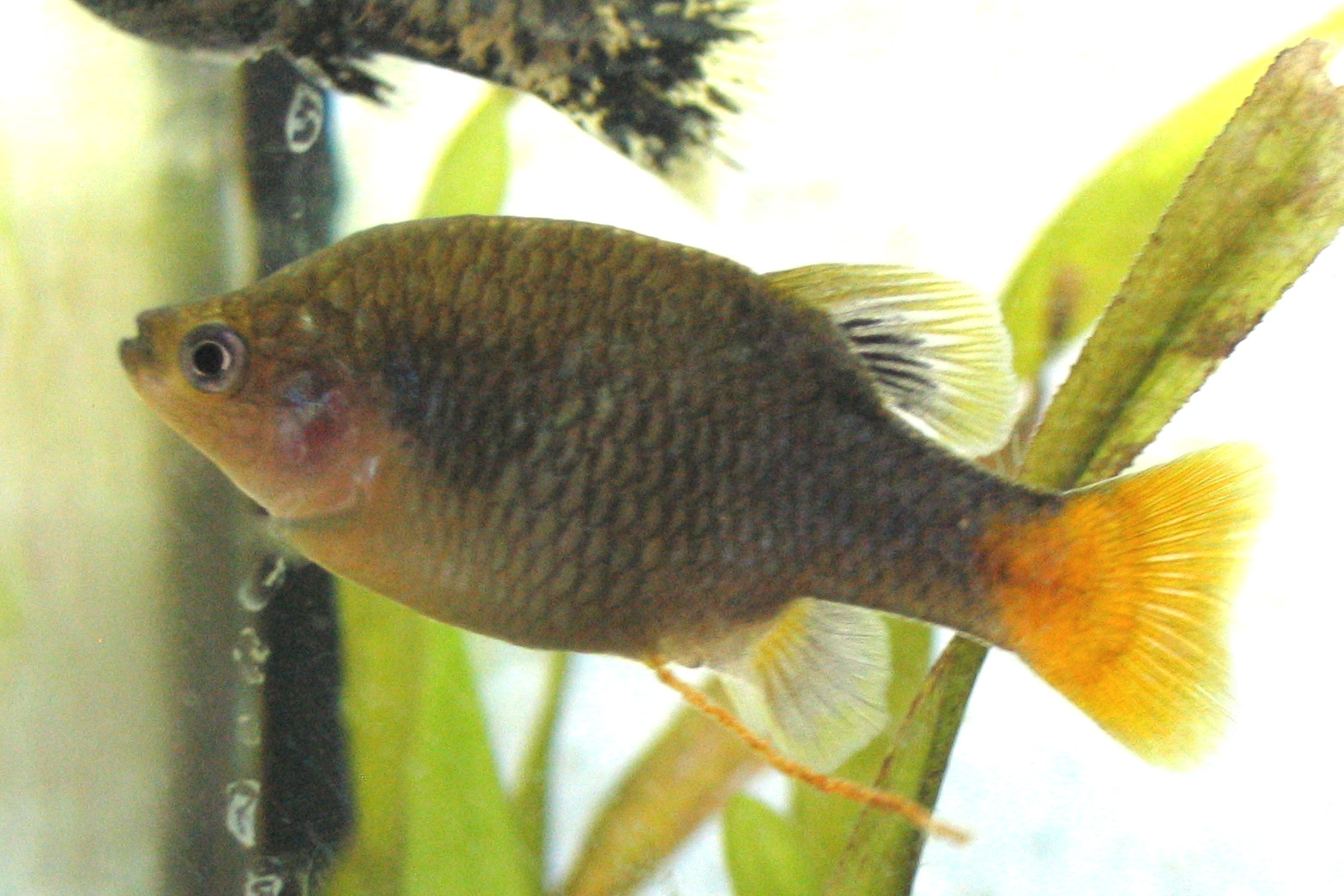
- Redtail splitfin, Xenotoca eiseni

Scientific classification
- Kingdom: Animalia
- Phylum: Chordata
- Class: Actinopterygii
- Division: Teleostei
- Clade: Ovalentaria
- Order: Cyprinodontiformes
- Suborder: Cyprinodontoidei
- Family: Goodeidae; Jordan & Gilbert 1883

Subfamilies
- Empetrichthyinae; Goodeinae; See text for genera and species.

= Goodeidae =

Splitfins Temporal range: Middle Miocene–present

Family of fishes

Goodeidae is a family of teleost fish endemic to Mexico and some areas of the United States. Many species are known as splitfins. This family contains about 50 species within 18 genera. The family is named after ichthyologist George Brown Goode (1851–1896).

The earliest fossil goodeid is Tapatia, a goodeine from the middle Miocene of Mexico. The earliest fossil empetrichthyine is Empetrichthys erdisi from the Miocene or Pliocene of California.

== Distribution ==
The family is divided into two subfamilies, the Goodeinae and the Empetrichthyinae. The Goodeinae are endemic to shallow freshwater habitats in Mexico, particularly along the Mesa Central area (especially the Lerma River basin, smaller rivers directly south of it and inland to around the Valley of Mexico region), with some species found in brackish fringes at the Pacific coast, and north to central Durango, central Sinaloa and north San Luis Potosí. There are about 45 species of Goodeinae in 16 genera (some list 2 additional genera). The Empetrichthyinae are found in the southwestern Great Basin in Nevada, the United States, and contains 4 species in 2 genera.

== Physical information ==
The name "splitfin" comes from the fact that, in the male fish, the anterior rays of the anal fin are partly separated from rest of the fin. Splitfins can be up to 20 cm (8 in) in length, though most species are much smaller, around 5 cm (2 in). Goodeid fish have internal fertilisation, with males positioning themselves with a flexible part of the front anal fin, separated by a notch, which makes up the andropodium. Embryos hatch out of the egg within the ovarian follicle, and possess trophotaeniae, ribbon-like structures that emerge from the cloaca in front of the anal fin, on the ventral surface of the juvenile. These allow the absorption of nutrients within the ovary (matrotrophy), and are shed by juveniles shortly after birth. Female goodeids do not store sperm, and so a copulation event must precede each pregnancy.

== Conservation status ==
In recent years, there has been a significant reduction in the range and size of Goodeid populations in this region, mainly due to anthropogenic disturbances, such as pollution, eutrophication, habitat modification and desiccation; recent estimates put habitat loss at 80% compared to historic ranges. The low economic importance of Goodeid fish to Mexican fisheries and industry has led to this family being largely ignored by conservation efforts, but their small size and the dedication of a small number of aquaria hobbyists has led to a recent increase in the amount of research dedicated to the family. These investigations have highlighted the implications for conservation efforts concerning other global freshwater ichthyofauna.

Several species are threatened or extinct according to the IUCN and the U.S. Fish and Wildlife Service

- Vulnerable – bold characodon, darkedged splitfin, Goodea gracilis, Allotoca dugesii
- Endangered – bluetail splitfin, rainbow characodon, relict splitfin, Allotoca diazi, Manse Spring killifish
- Critically endangered – blackspot allotoca, Chapultepec splitfin, highland splitfin, Balsas splitfin, Tequila splitfin, butterfly splitfin
- Extinct in the wild – golden skiffia
- Extinct – Ash Meadows killifish, Parras characodon, Raycraft poolfish, Pahrump Ranch poolfish

== Life cycle and evolution ==
The majority of Goodeid fish are viviparous, typically giving birth to live young. The family includes a number of popular aquarium fish, for example the redtail splitfin Xenotoca eiseni. Recent phylogenetic studies have put the age of this family at approximately 16.5 million years, with the majority of divergence occurring in the Miocene period. The speciosity of this family can be attributed to historical volcanic and geological disturbance in this region, which created suitable conditions for allopatric speciation of the fish.

== Genera ==
The following genera are included in Goodeidae:

Subfamily Empetrichthyinae – springfishes and poolfishes

- Crenichthys – springfishes
- Empetrichthys – poolfishes

Subfamily Goodeinae – typical goodeids and splitfins

- Allodontichthys
- Alloophorus – Bulldog goodeid
- Allotoca – typical allotocas
- Ameca – Butterfly splitfin, butterfly goodeid
- Ataeniobius – Striped goodeid, bluetail goodea
- Chapalichthys
- Characodon – characodons
- Girardinichthys
- Goodea
- Hubbsina
- Ilyodon
- Skiffia – skiffias
- Xenoophorus – Relict splitfin
- Xenotaenia – Leopard splitfin
- Xenotoca
- Zoogoneticus
