= Zacapu shiner =

Conservation status
- Endangered (IUCN 3.1)

Scientific classification
- Kingdom: Animalia
- Phylum: Chordata
- Class: Actinopterygii
- Order: Cypriniformes
- Family: Leuciscidae
- Genus: Notropis
- Species: N. grandis

Binomial name
- Notropis grandis Domínguez-Domínguez, Pérez-Rodríguez, Escalera-Vázquez and Doadrio, 2009

Species of fish

The Zacapu shiner (Notropis grandis) is a small North American freshwater fish, where it is known only from the Zacapu Lagoon and its outlet in Michoacán, Mexico.

The Zacapu shiner is a member of the Notropis calientis species complex along with the Ameca shiner, the Durango shiner and the Maravatio shiner, the latter being described concurrently with N. grandis.

== Description ==
The Zacapu shiner is differentiated from the other members of the N. calientis species complex by having six, rarely seven, branched rays in the anal fin and eight pelvic fin rays and by normally having 42 lateral line scales. It has a yellowish to light brown body with a dark lateral stripe which widens to form a slightly convex part from near the pectoral fin origin to the dorsal fin origin, becoming narrower and darker towards the rear. There is a dark marking on the caudal peduncle and at the origin of the caudal fin. There are fine markings around the base of the dorsal fin and the head is pigmented, the fins are unpigmented. It is the largest of the complex with an average length of 42.6 mm (1.68 in).

== Distribution, habitat and conservation ==
The Zacapu shiner is endemic to Zacapu Lagoon and its outlet in Michoacán in west central Mexico. Zacapu Lagoon lies in the drainage basin of the Lerma River and is fed by 12 springs and tin the area near the springs there is clear, well vegetated water but in the rest of lake the water is turbid. The introduction of exotic carp species the common carp (Cyprinus carpio) and grass carp (Ctenopharyngodon idella) has led to the parasite Bothriocephalus acheilognathi being able to invade the lake and its indigenous fish assemblage, potentially including the Zapacu shiner. The lake has also been affected by pollution and by water abstraction which has reduced its surface area to 32 hectares (79 acres). It was classified as endangered on the IUCN Red List in 2019, with threats cited such as the aforementioned water extraction, as well as pollution from urban and agricultural sources. More data are needed on the current population of N. grandis, and on its ecology.
