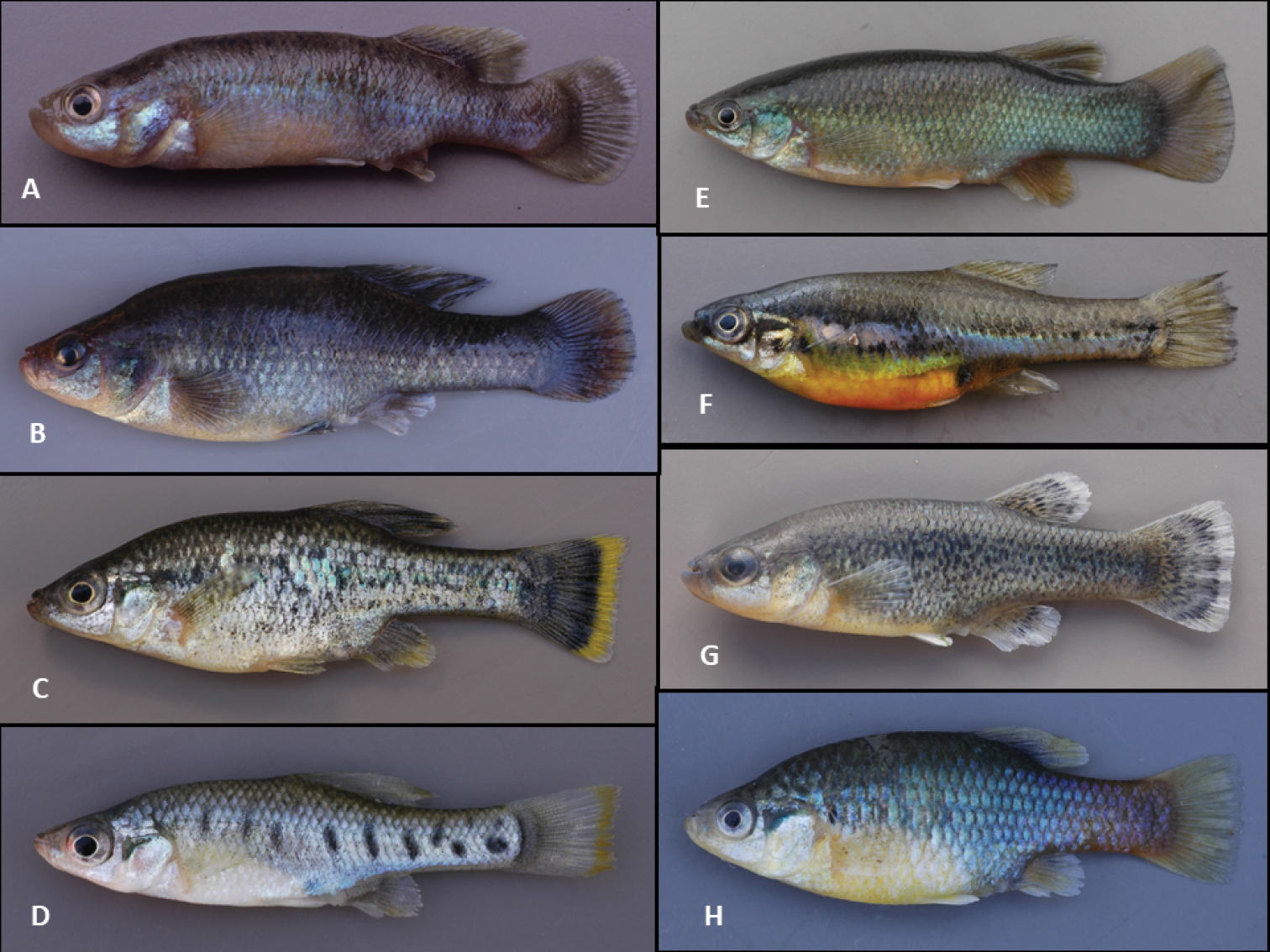
- Allotoca goselinei, as seen in Figure A, among other Goodeidae species.

Conservation status
- Extinct in the Wild (IUCN 3.1)

Scientific classification
- Kingdom: Animalia
- Phylum: Chordata
- Class: Actinopterygii
- Division: Teleostei
- Order: Cyprinodontiformes
- Family: Goodeidae
- Genus: Allotoca
- Species: A. goslinei

Binomial name
- Allotoca goslinei M. L. Smith & R. R. Miller, 1987

= Allotoca goslinei =

Banded allotoca

Species of fish

Allotoca goslinei, commonly known as the banded allotoca or tiro rayado in Spanish, is a species of fish in the family Goodeidae. First described in 1987, it was once endemic only to the Ameca River basin in the Mexican state of Jalisco. It is now known to be extinct in the wild.

Its specific name honors American ichthyologist William A. Gosline for his research on cyprinodontoid fish.

== Morphology ==
On average, males are 31.9mm long and females are 33.6mm long. It has two rows of conical teeth. A. goslinei differs from others in Allotoca by the number of vertebrae, supraorbital pores, and number of vertical stripes on its side.

== Habitat ==
A. goslinei inhabited small pools that feed into the Ameca River, preferring to reside in still, shallow waters beneath algae and floating plants.

== Diet ==
Their diet likely consists of small arthropods.

== Sexual dimorphism ==
This species is sexually dimorphic in coloring and fin length. Notably males have a longer dorsal fin than females.

== Conservation ==
With only one known population located in a single tributary of the Ameca River, A. goslinei is an evolutionarily significant unit. Though this species was first discovered in 1987, pollution led to population decline by the 1990s and by the 2000s, a more rapid decline took place after the introduction of Xiphophorus helleri.

=== Extinction ===
This species is now considered extinct in the wild, with the last known wild individuals were observed in 2004. No wild populations or individuals were found in surveys from 2005 and later. Small captive populations exist in Mexico, the United States, and Europe.

== See also ==
- Allotoca
  - Allotoca maculata
  - Allotoca meeki
- Goodeidae
  - Goodeinae
