= Maravatio shiner =

Conservation status
- Critically endangered, possibly extinct (IUCN 3.1)

Scientific classification
- Kingdom: Animalia
- Phylum: Chordata
- Class: Actinopterygii
- Order: Cypriniformes
- Family: Leuciscidae
- Subfamily: Pogonichthyinae
- Genus: Notropis
- Species: N. marhabatiensis

Binomial name
- Notropis marhabatiensis Domínguez-Domínguez, Pérez-Rodríguez, Escalera-Vázquez and Doadrio, 2009

Species of fish

The Maravatio shiner (Notropis marhabatiensis) is a small North American freshwater fish, where it is known only from San Miguel Spring of the upper Lerma River drainage in Mexico. The Maravatio shiner is a member of the Notropis calientis species complex along with the Ameca shiner, the Calabazas shiner, the Durango shiner and the Zacapu shiner, the latter being described concurrently with N. marhabatiensis.

== Conservation ==
The Maravatio shiner is found in a single pool around a spring near the town of Maravatio in Michoacan. In visits by researchers between 2004 and 2007 the species was not found. The small spring is enclosed by houses and is under intense human usage or recreation and sanitation. Exotic fish guppies (Poecilia reticulata), Twospot livebearers (Heterandria bimaculata) and Oreochromis sp. have been introduced and this could explain the possible absence of N. marhabatiensis from the spring. This species is evaluated as Critically Endangered and possibly extinct by the IUCN.
