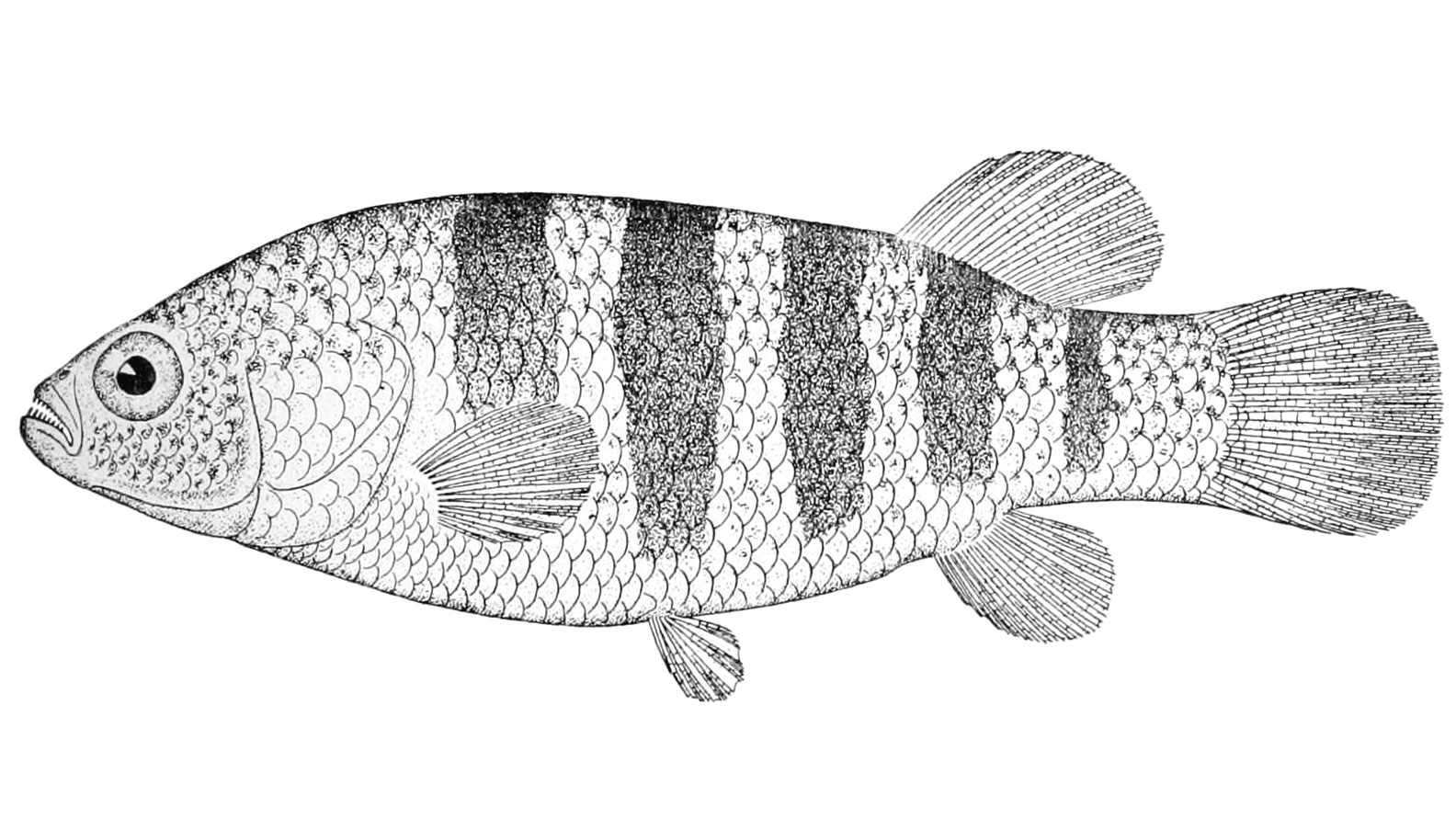
- Allotoca dugesii

Scientific classification
- Kingdom: Animalia
- Phylum: Chordata
- Class: Actinopterygii
- Order: Cyprinodontiformes
- Family: Goodeidae
- Subfamily: Goodeinae
- Genus: Allotoca; C. L. Hubbs & C. L. Turner, 1939

Type species
- Fundulus dugesii Bean, 1887

= Allotoca =

Genus of fishes

Allotoca is a genus of splitfins that are endemic to west-central and southwest Mexico, where restricted to the Lerna–Chapala–Grande de Santiago, Ameca and Balsas river basins, as well as various endorheic lake basins in Michoacán and Jalisco (Pátzcuaro, Zirahuén, Cuitzeo, Magdalena and others). All Allotoca species are seriously threatened.

The largest Allotoca is up to 12 cm (4.7 in) long, but most species only reach between half and three-quarter that size.

Unusually, A. catarinae is probably the result of an ancient translocation by humans in the pre-Columbian era (similar ancient human-assisted translocations are known from certain birds in Mexico). The translocation happened at least 700 years ago and most likely about 1900 years ago. The ancestral species then evolved into A. catarinae at its new isolated location in the Cupatitzio River, a tributary of the Balsas River.

== Species ==
FishBase recognizes eight species in this genus, but their taxonomy is complex and in need of a review. One of the species recognized by FishBase, A. regalis, is distinctive and sometimes placed in its own genus Neoophorus.

- Allotoca catarinae (F. de Buen, 1942) (Catarina allotoca)
- Allotoca diazi (Meek, 1902) (Patzcuaro allotoca)
- Allotoca dugesii (T. H. Bean, 1887) (Opal allotoca)
- Allotoca goslinei M. L. Smith & R. R. Miller, 1987 (Banded allotoca)
- Allotoca maculata M. L. Smith & R. R. Miller, 1980 (Blackspot alotoca)
- Allotoca meeki (Álvarez, 1959) (Zirahuen allotoca)
- Allotoca regalis (Álvarez, 1959) (Balsas allotoca)
- Allotoca zacapuensis M. K. Meyer, Radda & Domínguez-Domínguez, 2001 (Zacapu allotoca)
