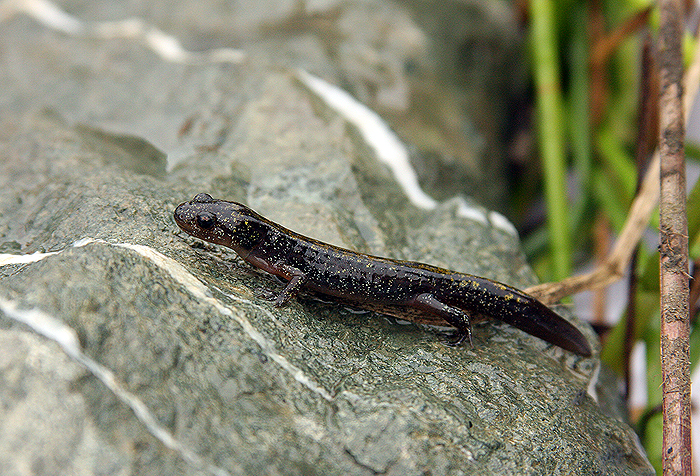

Conservation status
- Critically Imperiled (NatureServe)

Scientific classification
- Kingdom: Animalia
- Phylum: Chordata
- Class: Amphibia
- Order: Urodela
- Family: Ambystomatidae
- Genus: Ambystoma
- Species: A. macrodactylum
- Subspecies: A. m. croceum

Trinomial name
- Ambystoma macrodactylum croceum Russell & Anderson, 1956
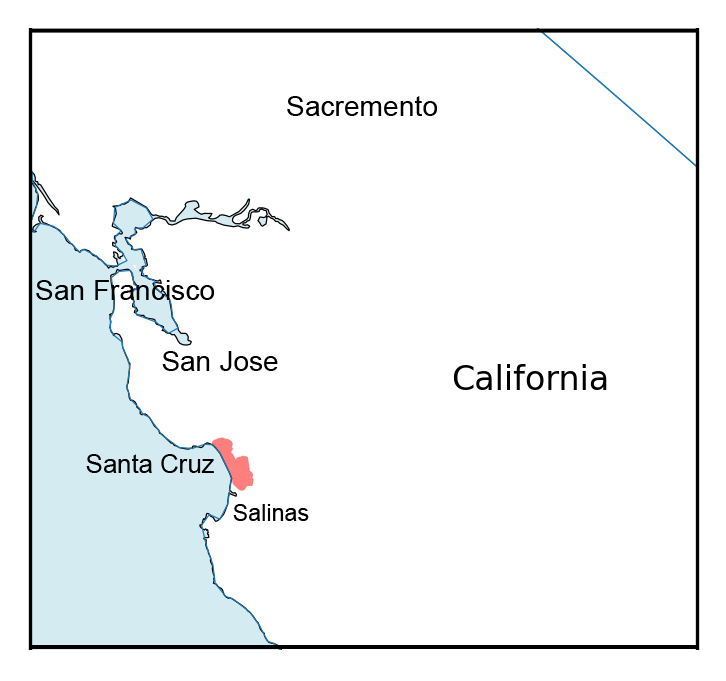
- Ambystoma macrodactylum croceum range

= Santa Cruz long-toed salamander =

Subspecies of amphibian

The Santa Cruz long-toed salamander (Ambystoma macrodactylum croceum) is an endangered subspecies of the long-toed salamander, which is found only close to a few isolated ponds in Santa Cruz and Monterey Counties in California. It has a black body, broken yellow or orange irregular striping along its spine, and a tail fin well evolved for swimming. Like other mole salamanders, it is found near pools or slow-moving streams and has a very secretive lifestyle, making it difficult to find.

== Comparison with the long-toed salamander ==
The Santa Cruz long-toed salamander range is geographically separate from other subspecies of the long-toed salamander (A. macrodactylum) by over 240 kilometers (150 mi). Whereas the nearest subspecies, A. m. sigillatum ("Southern long-toed salamander") ranges from Tuolumne County north, the Santa Cruz long-toed salamander is found only near a few isolated ponds in Santa Cruz and Monterey Counties. Like other long-toed salamanders, its belly is sooty to dark brown, and it has tubercles on its feet. The Santa Cruz long-toed salamander has an irregular broken yellow stripe on its back, whereas the common long-toed salamander has a more regular yellow, vertical stripe. Both species have 12 or 13 costal grooves visible from the side. The Santa Cruz long-toed salamander has a measurable degree of mitochondrial DNA genetic distance from the 'coastal' or 'western' subspecies of long-toed salamander. The genetic relationship, however, is still unclear, as more evidence is needed from additional genes and individuals In both species, eggs are laid singly near the water surface on rush-like spikes, but sometimes in small clusters at the base of logs or sticking to vegetation in the deeper parts of a pond. Hatching larvae are about 10 mm long, and in their first summer, they grow to 50 to 100 mm, but the Santa Cruz long-toed salamander is generally considered the smaller species. The precise times of migration for both species, to and from the breeding ponds, occur during periods of sustained nighttime rainfall.

== Valencia Lagoon, the modern discovery site ==
On December 2, 1954, the Santa Cruz long-toed salamander was discovered in Valencia Lagoon by R.W. Russell and James Anderson. This small, seasonal lagoon clogged with cattails in Aptos, California, measured only about 30 m by 150 m (100 ft by 500 ft) at that time. Caltrans filled half of the lagoon with a widening of State Route 1 in 1968. The next study of Valencia Lagoon occurred in 1974 by Earth Metrics, whose staff examined the lagoon to develop further migration strategies to allow the creature to better breed and migrate; that study also called for the permanent protection of Valencia Lagoon, which was later effected when the State of California purchased the lagoon. Hogan's study also noted the adverse effects of siltation occurring in Valencia Lagoon from the highway embankment erosion created by widening of Route 1; it was reasoned that the siltation should decrease once the vegetation became re-established on these slopes and allow the habitat to improve; moreover, the Earth Metrics study derived additional mitigation for the County of Santa Cruz to follow in considering any further discretionary actions around Valencia Lagoon.

== Life cycle ==
Most of this salamander's adult life is spent in upland coast live oak forest in small animal burrows during the long dry season (May to October) in coastal California. Once winter rains have soaked the soil and filled ephemeral streams, both males and females migrate up to 2 km to breeding ponds that exist only in winter. In January, the males arrive at the ponds first, in time to prepare for a nighttime courtship. When the male and female have completed their courtship, the male deposits a packet of sperm, the spermatophore, in the water, which the female retrieves and uses to fertilize her eggs. She may lay the eggs singly or in loose clusters of six to eight eggs in shallow water 5–8 cm deep. Neither parent tends the eggs, which hatch into tadpoles in March and metamorphose into adult salamanders when the pond begins to dry out. The tadpoles commonly eat small copepods. Predators that eat long-toed salamander larvae include aquatic invertebrates, garter snakes, and other vertebrates. Other species of salamander tadpoles (larvae) compete with those of the long-toed salamander.

The breeding ponds of most species of long-toed salamanders completely dry up during the dry season. The year-round ponds likely harbor frogs, fish, and other aquatic predators that eat young salamanders, so these salamanders prefer ephemeral ponds. Most species of long-toed salamanders migrate up into nearby forests and do not spend any time near the breeding pond once they have metamorphosed and the pond is dry. A. m. croceum juveniles, though, often spend their first summer close to the breeding pond in a rodent burrow or rock fissure, only later migrating uphill into the forest. This may be because A. m. croceum breeding ponds retain water all summer.

== Conservation status ==
Ambystoma macrodactylum croceum was designated as federally endangered in 1967 under the Endangered Species Preservation Act (a precursor to the Endangered Species Act of 1973), and endangered by the State of California in 1971;. It has also been designated as Critically imperiled at the global and state level by NatureServe. Its limited range and fragile specialized habitat place severe restrictions to the viability of this species. There is no definitive population estimate for the Santa Cruz long-toed salamander, but the numbers are deemed to be quite small. Further disturbance of its limited habitat could lead to this species' extinction.
