= Chapultepec (disambiguation) =

Chapultepec is a city park in Mexico City.

Chapultepec may also refer to:

- Chapultepec Zoo, a zoo in the park
- Chapultepec Castle, a castle in the park
  - Museo Nacional de Historia, located inside the castle
- Battle of Chapultepec, an 1847 battle in Mexico City
- Chapultepec metro station, a Mexico City Metro station serving the zone
- Chapultepec (Mexico City Metrobús), a BRT station in Mexico City
- Chapultepec Uno R509, a skyscraper in Mexico City
- Chapultepec, State of Mexico, a town and municipality
- Chapultepec splitfin, a Critically Endangered species of fish
- Club de Golf Chapultepec, a golf club in Naucalpan

== See also ==
- Lomas de Chapultepec, a colonia near Chapultepec
- Chapultepec aqueduct, an aqueduct in Chapultepec
- Chapultepec Peace Accords, a 1992 Salvadorian peace treaty
