= Zacapu Lagoon =

Wetland in Zacapu, Mexico

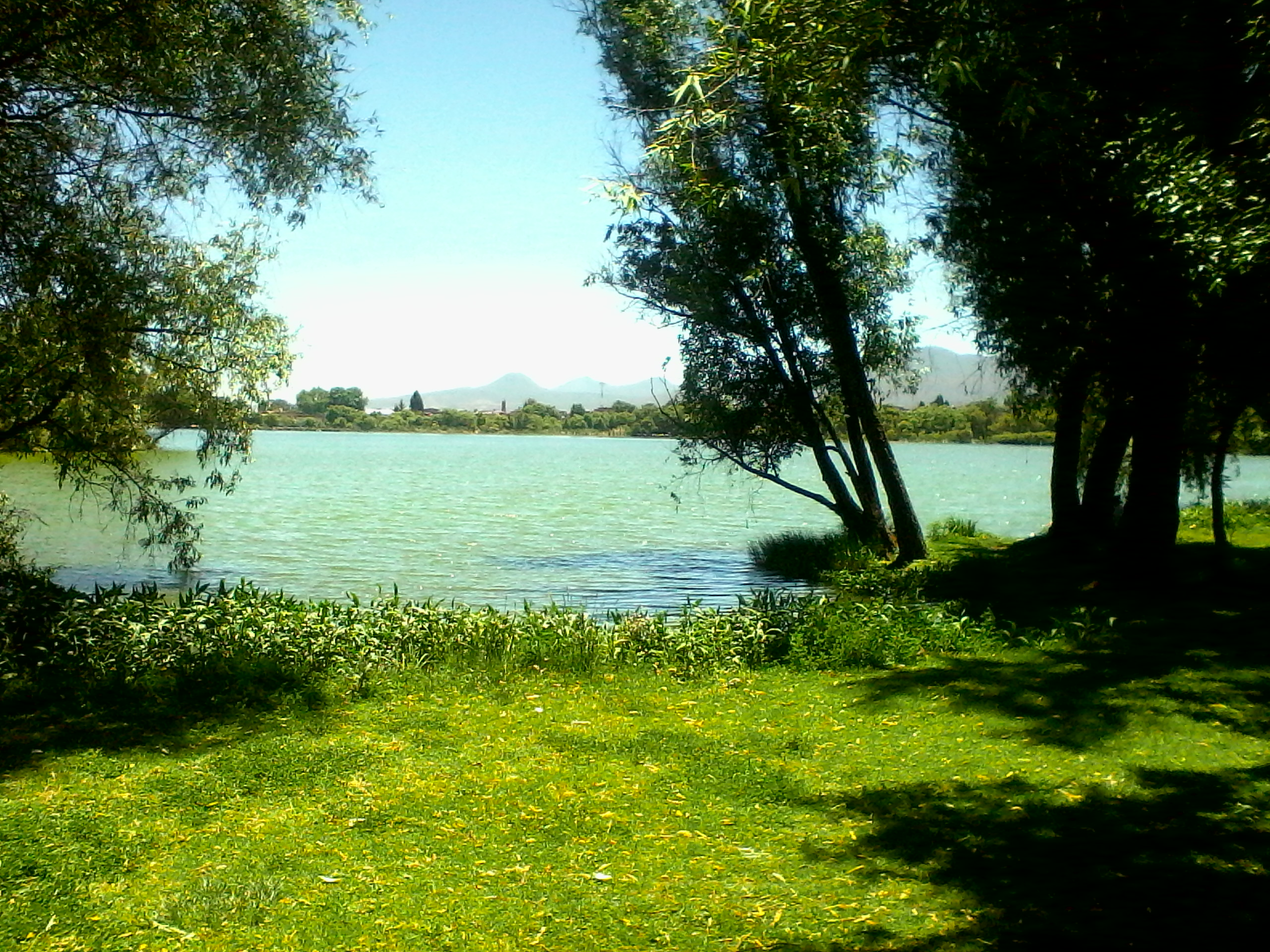

- Location within Michoacán
- Location: Mexico
- Coordinates: 19°49′29″N 101°47′15″W
- Type: Lagoon
- Part of: Basin of the Lerma River
- River sources: Angulo
- Surface area: 33.5 ha (83 acres)
- Surface elevation: 1,980 m (6,500 ft)
- Settlements: Zacapu

The Zacapu Lagoon is a small perennial wetland located within the urban area of Zacapu, Michoacán, Mexico. It has an approximate area of 33 hectares, connects with the Lerma River through the Angulo River and is fed by 20 springs. The Zacapu Lagoon was included within the Ramsar wetlands in June 2004.

Zacapu Lagoon is the only known habitat for the Zacapu shiner, Zacapu allotoca, Zacapu dwarf crayfish and Anderson's salamander and Girardinichthys ireneae and also a subespecies of Mexican garter snake (Thamnophis eques insperatus) is endemic of this water body.
