= Dark-edged splitfin =

Conservation status
- Endangered (IUCN 3.1)

Scientific classification
- Kingdom: Animalia
- Phylum: Chordata
- Class: Actinopterygii
- Order: Cyprinodontiformes
- Family: Goodeidae
- Genus: Girardinichthys
- Species: G. multiradiatus

Binomial name
- Girardinichthys multiradiatus (Meek, 1904)

Synonyms
- Characodon multiradiatus Meek, 1904; Lermichthys multiradiatus (Meek, 1904); Girardinichthys innominatus Bleeker, 1860; Girardinichthys limnurgus Jordan & Evermann, 1927

Species of fish

The dark-edged splitfin (Girardinichthys multiradiatus) is a species of fish in the family Goodeidae endemic to Mexico. It is a live-bearing, cold-water fish from the mountains of Mexico. The species is incredibly temperature sensitive. If water is too cold, all offspring turn out to be male. If water is too hot, females will birth their first brood of only 1–3 fry and then die shortly thereafter, which makes it very difficult to maintain a colony. It is also a primarily carnivorous species that eats a variety of insects. Girardinichtys multiradiatus is an endangered species with multiple population threats with little conservation efforts put in place to protect the species.

== Anatomy and morphology ==
The dark-edged splitfin varies in shades of yellow, from a grey yellow to bright yellow. G. multiradiatus females reach about 3 inches and males 2.5 inches in length. The species is commonly called the "golden sailfin goodeid" due to their extended fins, especially the males. The males show a notch in the anal fin after the first shorter rays. Additionally, males have longer and broader dorsal and anal fins than the females. The fins of the females are typically clear while the males fins are yellow with a black band on the end. G. multiradiatus females have distinct stripes towards the posterior end of the body.

== Distribution and habitat ==
Girardinichthys multiradiatus can be found in still or slightly moving water in Mexico. The water in which they habitat are mainly considered small lakes, spring-fed ponds, and pools off of colder temperature streams. The dark-edged splitfin prefers bodies of water that range in clear to muddy visibility, and have a bottom of silt, mud, clay, sand, gravel, and rocks. They also prefer water depths to be less than 1 m. The habitat of the dark-edged splitfin also includes a variety of green algae. G. multiradiatus can be found in bodies of water with a pH ranging between 7 and 9, and a dissolved oxygen level between 7 and 10ppm. The preferred water temperature for the highs range from 20–25 degrees Celsius and for the lows range from 10–18 degrees Celsius.

== Behavior ==
=== Social behavior ===
G. multiradiatus tend to school with each other. They detect nearby movements using a mechanosensory system known as their lateral line system. They use this system to detect many behaviors such as schooling, rheotaxis, and predator-prey interaction. Not only do they use mechanosensory, they also use water movements to show social behaviors.

=== Diet ===
Dark-edged splitfin fish are found to be mainly a carnivorous species. They feed on many different insects. A study found that much of the contents in the stomach composed of chironomid-larvae, mayflies, Hymenoptera, Diptera-larvae, Detritus, and Cladocera. Juvenile G. multiradiatus are found to mostly feed on Cladocera and Diptera.

=== Breeding ===
G. multiradiatus breed between the months of March, with increased temperatures, to September. The gestation period is normally around 55 days. Females produce anywhere from 10 to 20 fry. It is found that females choose who they mate with, depending on the courtship of the male.

=== Courtship ===
Courtship patterns in males is a heritable trait. G. multiradiatus courtship patterns are also influenced by what females they are raised with. The males approach either sex displaying their fins and remaining static. They approach them either face to face or by showing the lateral fin display. If the other fish is a male, it will also show a fin display while remaining static and will eventually turn into a fight between the two fish. If the other fish is a female, it will fold its fins and waves its body in a vibrating behavior. The male dark-edged splitfin will then stop the static posture and performs a courtship to attract the female. The courtship dance involves fin waving and shaking the body in a figure eight motion. It is found that the females can respond in many different ways. This includes performing frontal or lateral fin displays, swimming away, fleeing, approaching the male, swimming beside the male, attempting to bite the male, vibrating the body while tilting forward, and vibrating the body without tilting.

== Taxonomy ==
The first specimen was collected by J.N. Rose in the twentieth century. It was originally referred as Girardinichthys innominatus in 1902 by Evermann and Goldsborough. In 1926, Hubbs transferred the specimen into a new genus known as Lermichthys. It was not long after that in 1927, Jordan and Evermann, gave the specimen a new description known as Girardinichthys limnurgus. The final change in the species genus was in 1971 by Miller and Fitzsimons, where they placed it in the genus Girardinichtys.

== Conservation status ==
The Girardinichthys multiradiatus are an endangered species.

=== Threats ===
Threats to the populations of G. multiradiatus include pollution from urban, industrial, agricultural, and livestock waste. Other threats include other species of fish that are non-native aggressive species, which feed on the fry of G. multiradiatus. Lastly, the competition of food between the non-native species and Girardinichthys multiradiatus is a major threat.

=== Conservation efforts ===
There are conservation efforts for the dark-edged splitfin by The Lakes of Zempoala, which is a National Park, and the University of Michoacan. They put in place land/water protection and land/water management, as well as education and awareness. Land/water protection focuses on the site/area protection and the resource and habitat protection. Land/water management focuses on the invasive/problematic species control.
