= Girardinichthys ireneae =

Scientific classification
- Kingdom: Animalia
- Phylum: Chordata
- Class: Actinopterygii
- Order: Cyprinodontiformes
- Family: Goodeidae
- Genus: Girardinichthys
- Species: G. ireneae

Binomial name
- Girardinichthys ireneae Radda & M. K. Meyer, 2003

Species of fish

Girardinichthys ireneae is a species of fish from the family Goodeidae which is endemic to Laguna de Zacapu in Michoacán state of Mexico. Some authorities consider that this taxon is synonymous with Hubbsina turneri.

== Etymology ==
The specific name honours Mrs Irene Radda of Vienna.
