= Charles Frédéric Girard =

French biologist (1822–1895)

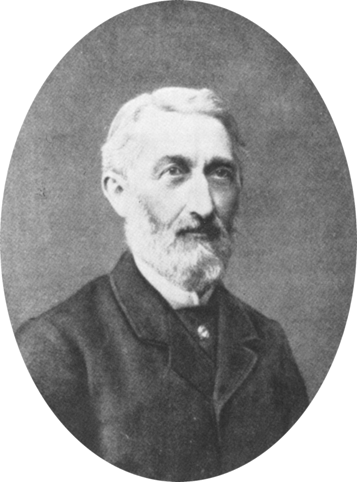
- Born: 8 April 1822; Mulhouse, France
- Died: 29 January 1895 (aged 72); Neuilly-sur-Seine
- Citizenship: French and American
- Education: College of Neuchâtel, Georgetown University
- Awards: Cuvier Prize of the Institut de France
- Scientific career
- Fields: Biology; Herpetology; Ichthyology
- Institutions: Smithsonian Institution
- Author abbrev. (zoology): Girard

Charles Frédéric Girard (French pronunciation: [ʃaʁl fʁedeʁik ʒiʁaʁ]; 8 March 1822 – 29 January 1895) was a French biologist specializing in ichthyology and herpetology.

== Biography ==
Girard was born on 8 March 1822 in Mulhouse, France. He studied at the College of Neuchâtel, Switzerland, as a student of Louis Agassiz. In 1847, he accompanied Agassiz as his assistant to Harvard University. Three years later, Spencer Fullerton Baird called him to the Smithsonian Institution to work on its growing collection of North American reptiles, amphibians and fishes. He worked at the museum for the next ten years and published numerous papers, many in collaboration with Baird.

In 1854, he was naturalized as a U.S. citizen. Besides his work at the Smithsonian, he managed to earn an M.D. from Georgetown University in Washington, D.C. in 1856. In 1859 he returned to France and was awarded the Cuvier Prize by the Institute of France for his work on the North American reptiles and fishes two years later.

When the American Civil War broke out, he joined the Confederates as an agent for surgical and medical supplies. After the war, he remained in France and started a medical career. During the Franco-Prussian War he served as a military physician and published an important paper on the typhoid fever after the siege of Paris. He remained active as a medical doctor until c. 1888. In the following three years, he published a few more papers on natural history.

He retired in 1891 and spent the rest of his life in Neuilly-sur-Seine, where he died on 29 January 1895.

== Eponymy ==
Girard is commemorated in the names of the following taxa:

- Girardinus Poey, 1854
- Girardinichthys Bleeker, 1860
- Cambarus girardianus Faxon, 1884
- Masticophis taeniatus girardi (Stejneger & Barbour, 1917)
- Microcyphus girardi Desor
- Synapta girardi Pourtalès
- Vortex girardi O. Schmidt, 1857

== See also ==
- Taxa named by Charles Frédéric Girard
