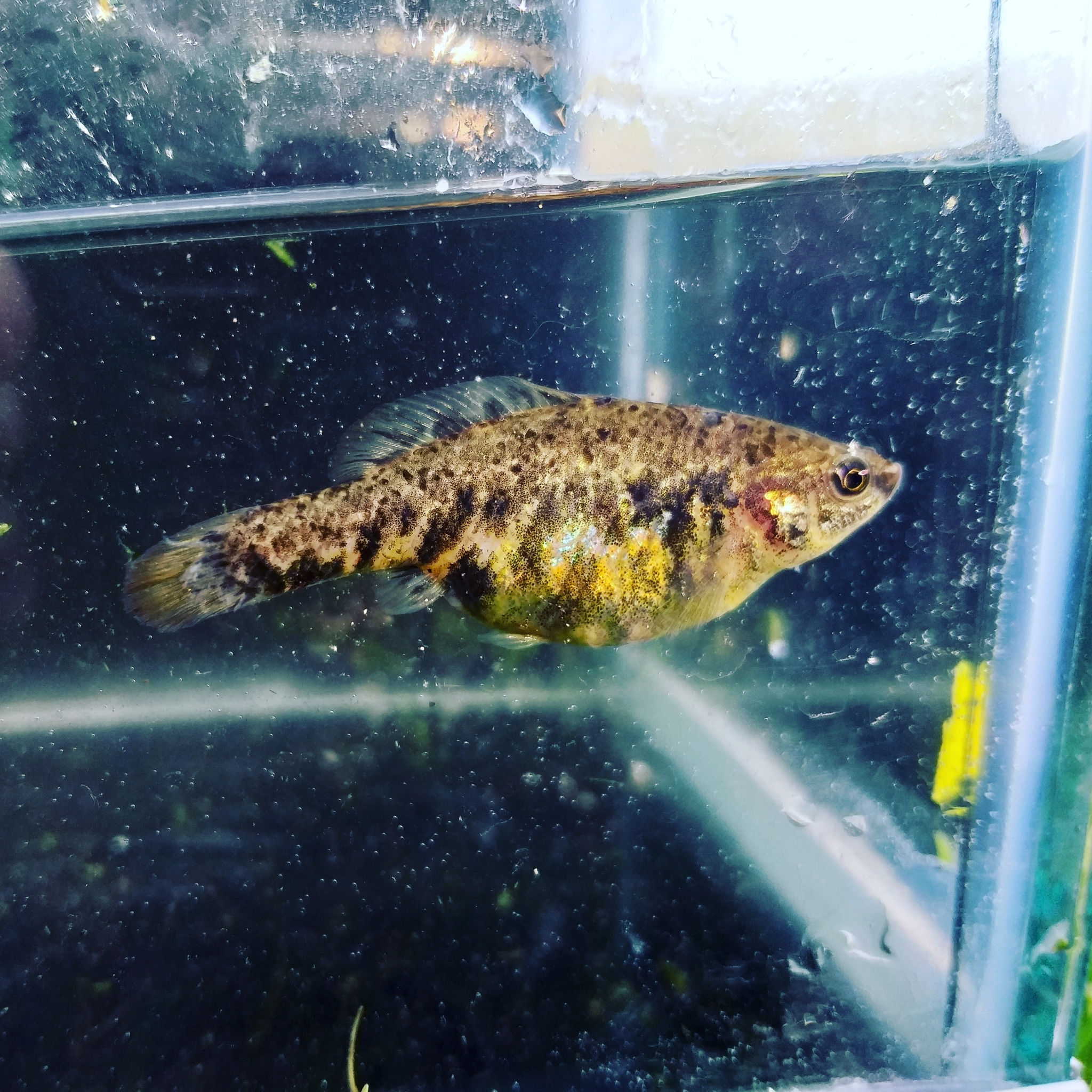

Conservation status
- Critically Endangered (IUCN 3.1)

Scientific classification
- Kingdom: Animalia
- Phylum: Chordata
- Class: Actinopterygii
- Order: Cyprinodontiformes
- Family: Goodeidae
- Genus: Hubbsina; F. de Buen, 1940
- Species: H. turneri

Binomial name
- Hubbsina turneri F. de Buen, 1940

Synonyms
- Girardinichthys turneri (F. de Buen, 1940)

= Hubbsina =

Genus of fishes

The Highland splitfin (Hubbsina turneri) is a species of splitfin endemic to Mexico where it is found in the Lerma River basin. This species grows to a length of 5 centimetres (2.0 in) TL. It is the only known member of its genus, although some authorities have Hubbina as a subgenus of Girardinichthys and add Girardinichthys ireneae to the subgenus, even treating this taxon as a synonym of G. ireneae. This species was described by Fernando de Buen y Lozano in 1940 with the type locality given as Cointzio, Michoacán. The name of the genus honours the American ichthyologist Carl Leavitt Hubbs (1894-1979) while the specific name honours Clarence Lester Turner (1890-1969), thus honouring two ichthyologists who worked on a review of the Goodeidae in 1939.
