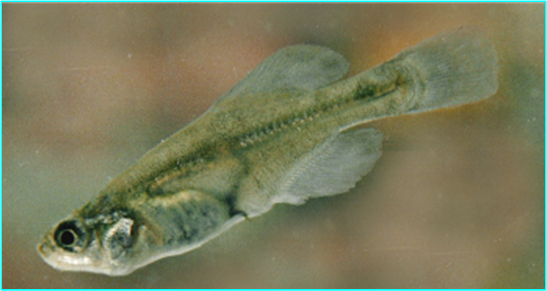
- Girardinichthys viviparus

Scientific classification
- Kingdom: Animalia
- Phylum: Chordata
- Class: Actinopterygii
- Order: Cyprinodontiformes
- Family: Goodeidae
- Subfamily: Goodeinae
- Genus: Girardinichthys; Bleeker, 1860

Type species
- Girardinichthys innominatus Bleeker, 1860

= Girardinichthys =

Genus of fishes

Girardinichthys is a genus of splitfins that are endemic to Mexico. These highly threatened fish are native to the upper Lerma and Balsas basins, as well as water systems in the Valley of Mexico. Through man-made channels G. viviparus has been able to spread to the upper Pánuco River basin. These small fish reach up to 6.5 cm (2.6 in) in length. The name of this genus honours the American herpetologist and ichthyologist Charles Girard (1822-1895).

== Species ==
There are currently three recognized species in this genus:

- Girardinichthys ireneae Radda & M. K. Meyer, 2003
- Girardinichthys multiradiatus (Meek, 1904) (Dark-edged Splitfin, Golden Sailfin Goodeid)
- Girardinichthys turneri (De Buen, 1940)
- Girardinichthys viviparus (Bustamante, 1837) (Chapultepec Splitfin, mexclapique)
