= Allotoca zacapuensis =

Conservation status
- Critically Endangered (IUCN 3.1)

Scientific classification
- Kingdom: Animalia
- Phylum: Chordata
- Class: Actinopterygii
- Order: Cyprinodontiformes
- Family: Goodeidae
- Genus: Allotoca
- Species: A. zacapuensis

Binomial name
- Allotoca zacapuensis Meyer, Radda, & Domínguez, 2001

Species of fish

Allotoca zacapuenis, the Zacapu allotoca, also known in Spanish as tiro de la Laguna de Zacapu, is a species of fish in the Goodeidae family, endemic to Zacapu Lagoon and the Angulo River in Lerma River Basin, Mexico.

== Description ==
The background color of the body is grayish-brown in both sexes. Blue, pink, and green reflections appear along the midline and belly. The sides of the body display a series of 10 to 14 vertical bars, which are broad and more prominent on the posterior half. The longitudinal region has dark spots, sometimes more abundant in the middle. The scales on the upper body have a dark reticulated pattern. The abdominal region has a dark brown area. The dorsal fin is light orange, the anal and caudal fins are yellow or orange, and the paired fins are hyaline.

The average size of the fish is 3 centimetres (1.2 in), although the largest documented specimen is only 5 centimetres (2.0 in). Despite this, the Zacapu allotoca is among the larger Allotoca species. Due to its unassuming appearance, the Allotoca zacapuensis is not highly valued as an aquarium fish.

== Habitat ==
This fish is found exclusively in Zacapu Lagoon, generally near the shores at depths of 50 to 100 centimetres (20 to 39 in). This is because the water temperature must not exceed 23 °C (73 °F), as survival is very difficult for them. The bottom where they live is basically mud, and this fish prefers areas with abundant vegetation, that is, many plants in which to hide and spawn. This fish has only been collected in two locations and is distributed in only 5% of Zacapu Lagoon. It is a species considered endangered, stable but very rare.
