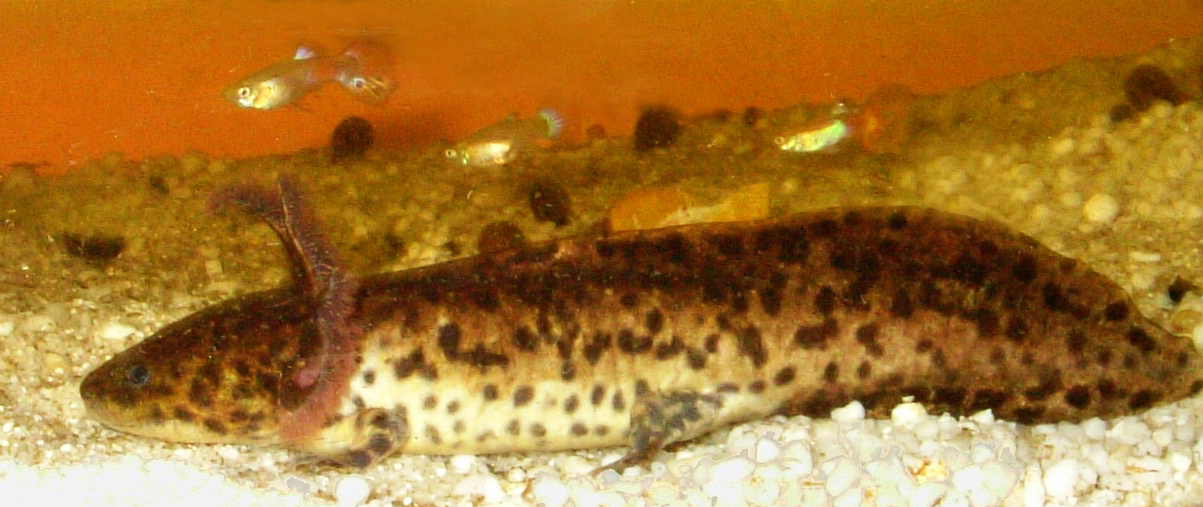

Conservation status
- Critically Endangered (IUCN 3.1)

Scientific classification
- Kingdom: Animalia
- Phylum: Chordata
- Class: Amphibia
- Order: Urodela
- Family: Ambystomatidae
- Genus: Ambystoma
- Species: A. andersoni

Binomial name
- Ambystoma andersoni (Brandon and Krebs, 1984)

= Anderson's salamander =

Species of amphibian

Anderson's salamander (Ambystoma andersoni) is a neotenic salamander from Zacapu Lagoon in the Mexican state of Michoacán.

This salamander is a relatively recent discovery, first described by Branden and Krebs in 1984. Ambystoma andersoni is named after James Anderson, a herpetologist with the American Museum of Natural History, who did extensive fieldwork studying Ambystoma and other amphibians and reptiles in Mexico.

Like all neotenic Ambystoma species, A. andersoni retains its larval features into adulthood. The mature salamander has medium-sized external gills with bright red filaments, and a prominent caudal fin. It has a large head and small limbs, as do the larvae. Its coloration is a strange pattern of black blotches on a red-brown base. The salamanders are totally aquatic and spend their whole lives in the same body of water. Females lay dark yellowish-brown eggs that are approximately 2.2–2.3 mm in diameter, and hatchlings measure about 12–13 mm in total length and lack balancers, a trait common among members of the Ambystoma tigrinum group.

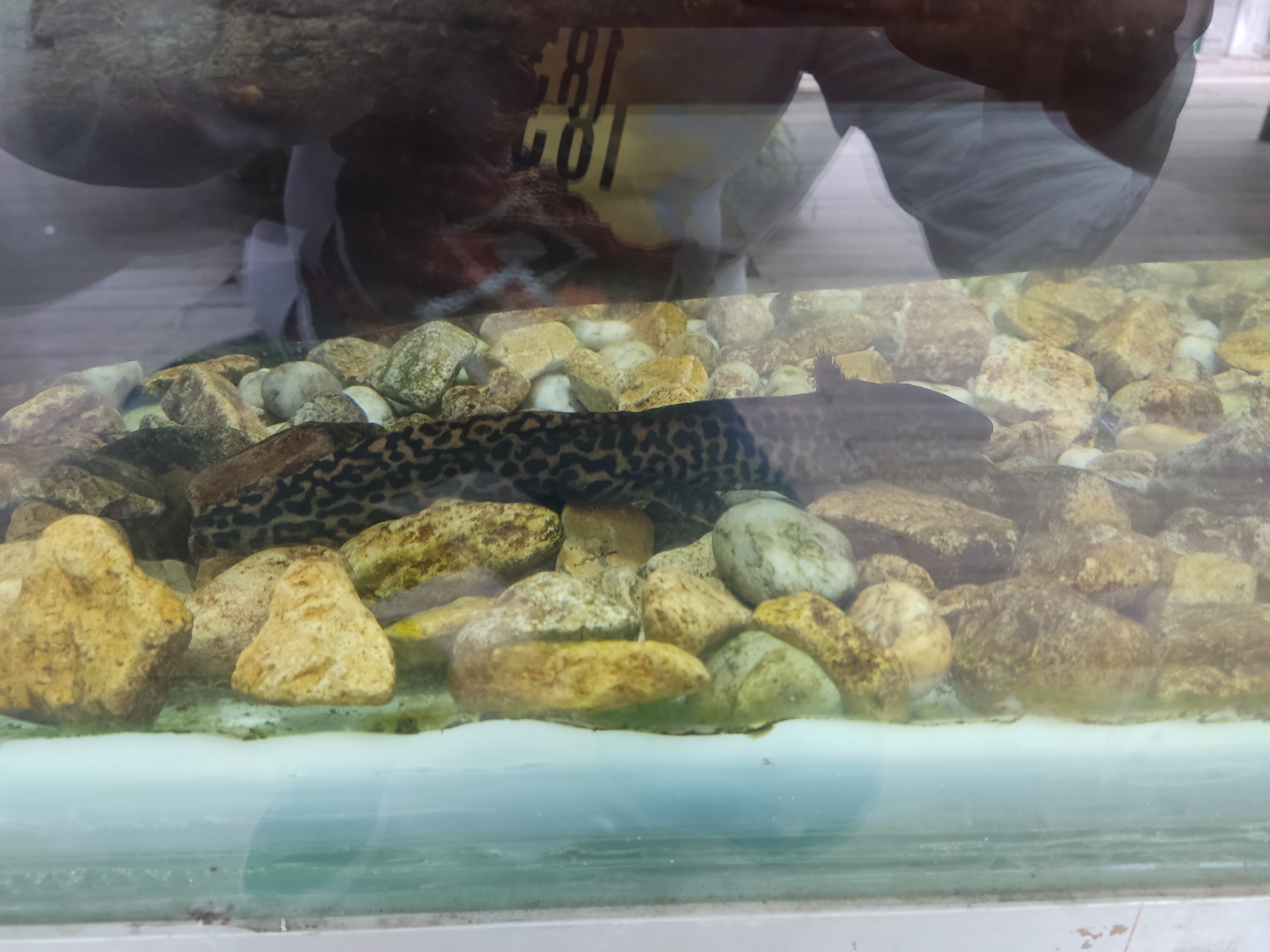
Anderson's salamander in Morelia Zoo.

== Habitat ==
Lake Zacapu is a small lake near Zacapu, sitting at an altitude of 2000 meters. The lake is located within the Mesa Central portion of Mexico, an area home to many neotenic Ambystoma species. It is temperate, with low salinity, and has a single stream originating from it.

Ambystoma andersoni is listed as critically endangered on the IUCN Red List.

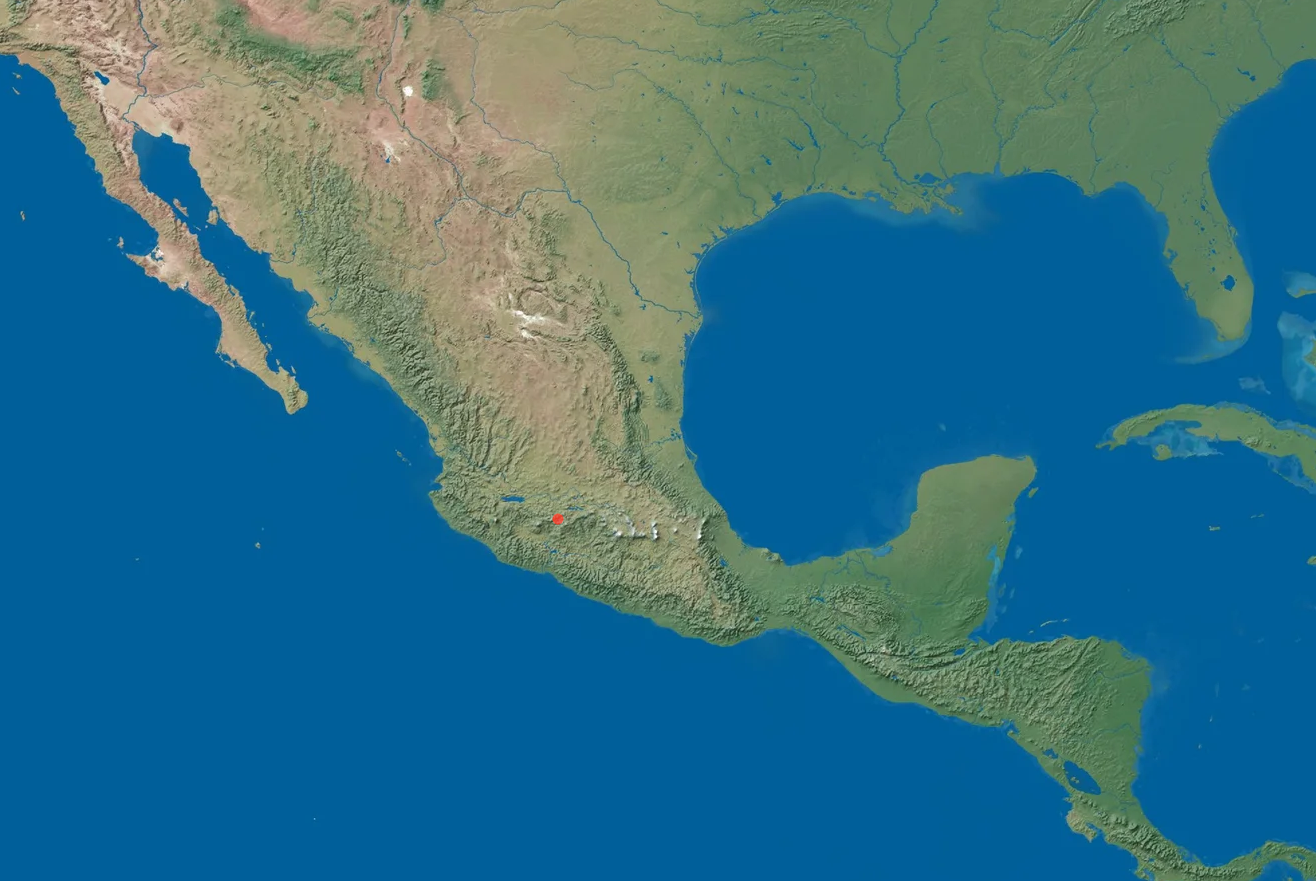
map of where Anderson's salamander occurs
