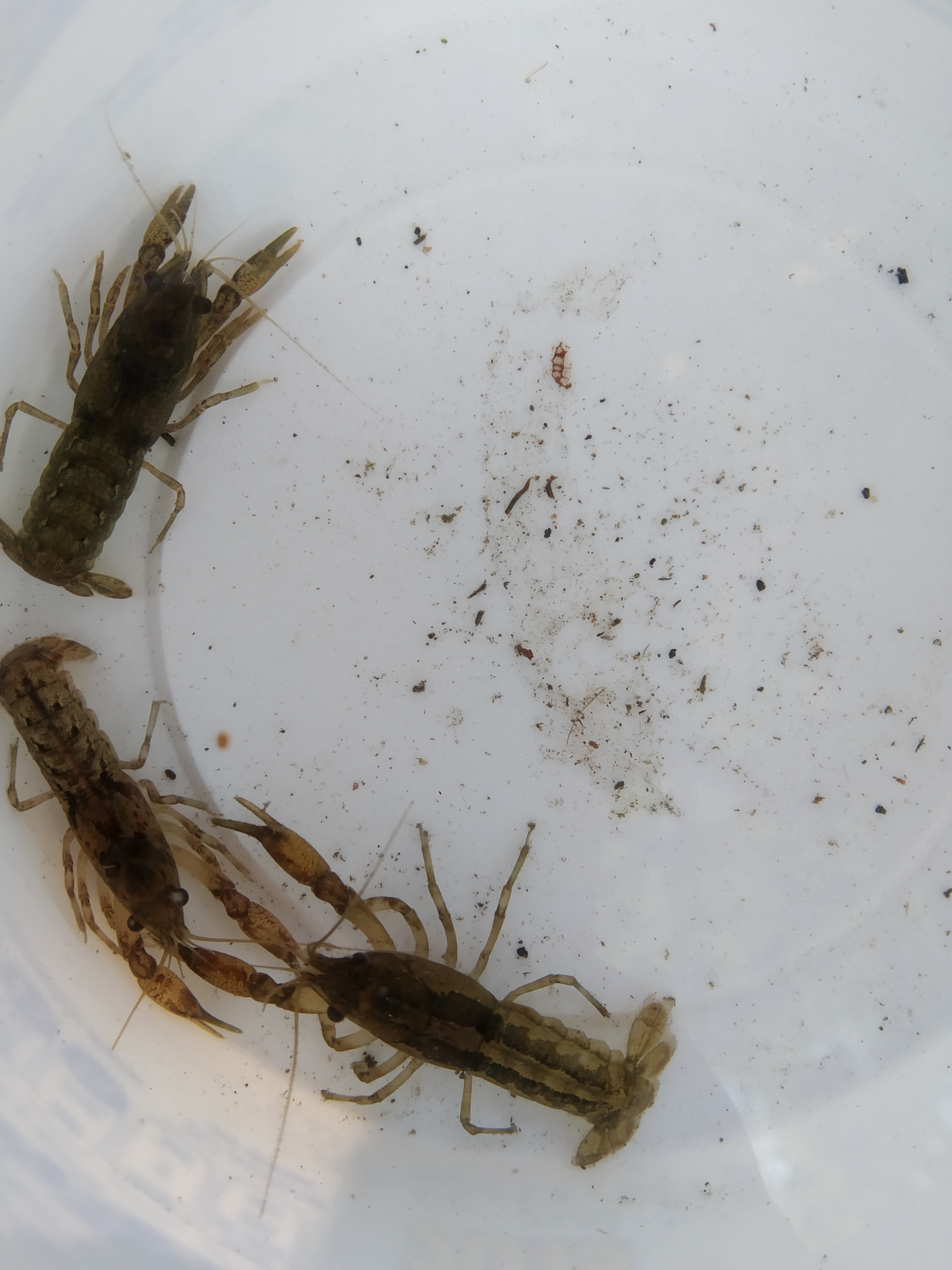

Scientific classification
- Kingdom: Animalia
- Phylum: Arthropoda
- Class: Malacostraca
- Order: Decapoda
- Suborder: Pleocyemata
- Family: Cambaridae
- Genus: Cambarellus
- Species: C. zacapuensis

Binomial name
- Cambarellus zacapuensis Pedraza Lara & Doadrio, 2015

= Cambarellus zacapuensis =

Species of crayfish

Cambarellus zacapuensis is a small crustacean in the family Cambaridae. It is endemic to the Angulo River basin, observed mainly in Zacapu Lagoon.

== Description ==
Cambarellus zacapuensis is a species morphologically very similar to the Cambarellus chapalanus. Males of C. zacapuensis have an average length of 26 millimeters, with a 12 millimeters long and 5.5 millimeters wide cephalothorax, while females have an average length of 32 millimeters, with a 14.5 millimeters long and 7 millimeters wide cephalothorax. C. zacapuensis has a pigmented body, well-developed eyes, and a rostrum with marginal spines. Its shell lacks a cervical spine or a branchial spine.

== Conservation status and habitat ==
Cambarellus zacapuensis is found mainly in Zacapu Lagoon and in some of its drains such as the Angulo River. It is usually found at a shallow depth, between submerged roots and in the aquatic substrate.

The introduction of invasive species such as common carp and grass carp pose a threat to the Cambarellus zacapuensis population, as has happened to other species of the Cambarellus genus elsewhere. The exploitation of the water resources of their habitat by human action also represents a threat to the small crustacean, which is why it could be considered "critically endangered" under IUCN criteria.
