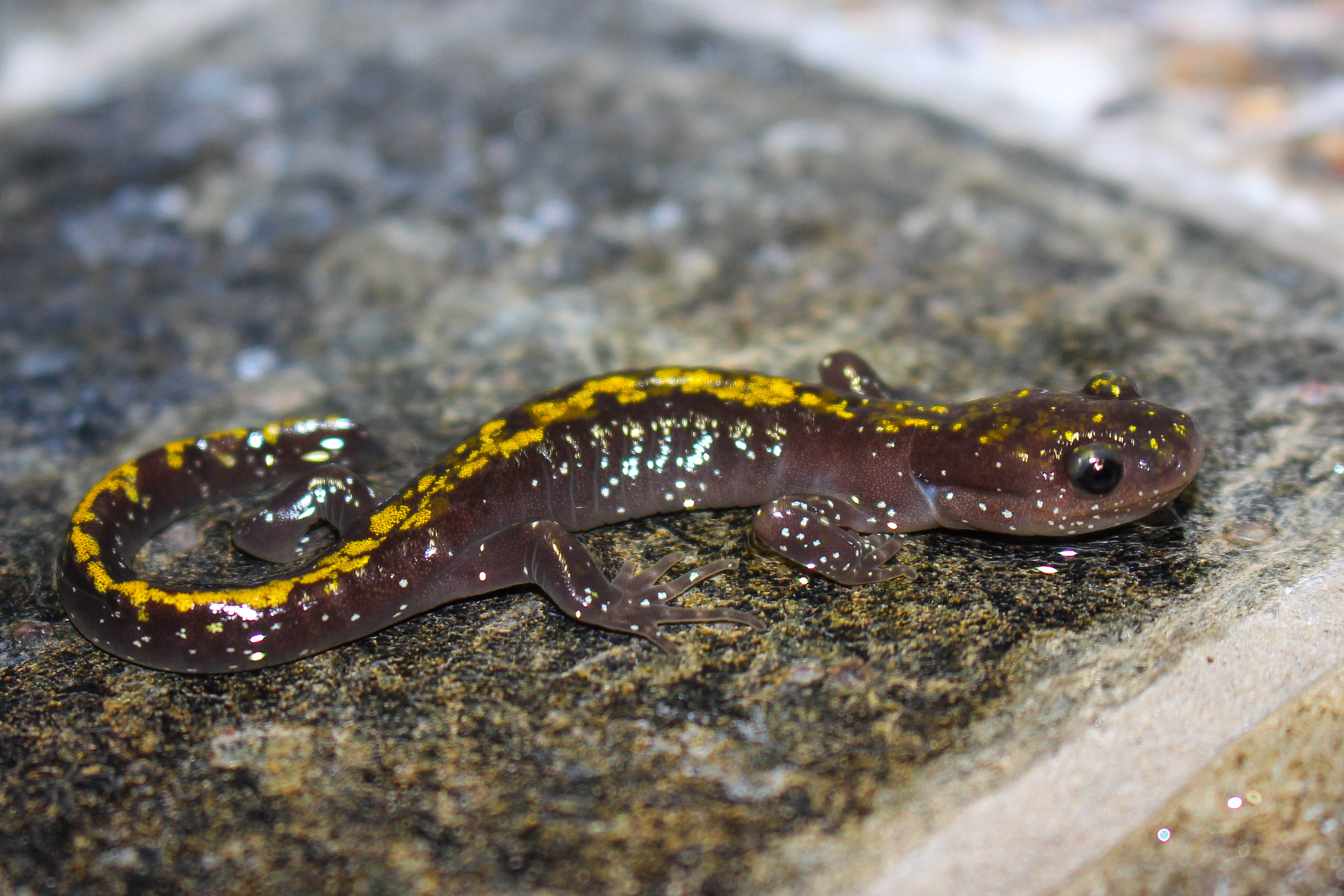

Conservation status
- Least Concern (IUCN 3.1)

Scientific classification
- Kingdom: Animalia
- Phylum: Chordata
- Class: Amphibia
- Order: Urodela
- Family: Ambystomatidae
- Genus: Ambystoma
- Species: A. macrodactylum

Binomial name
- Ambystoma macrodactylum Baird, 1850

Subspecies
- A. m. columbianum A. m. croceum A. m. krausei A. m. macrodactylum A. m. sigillatum
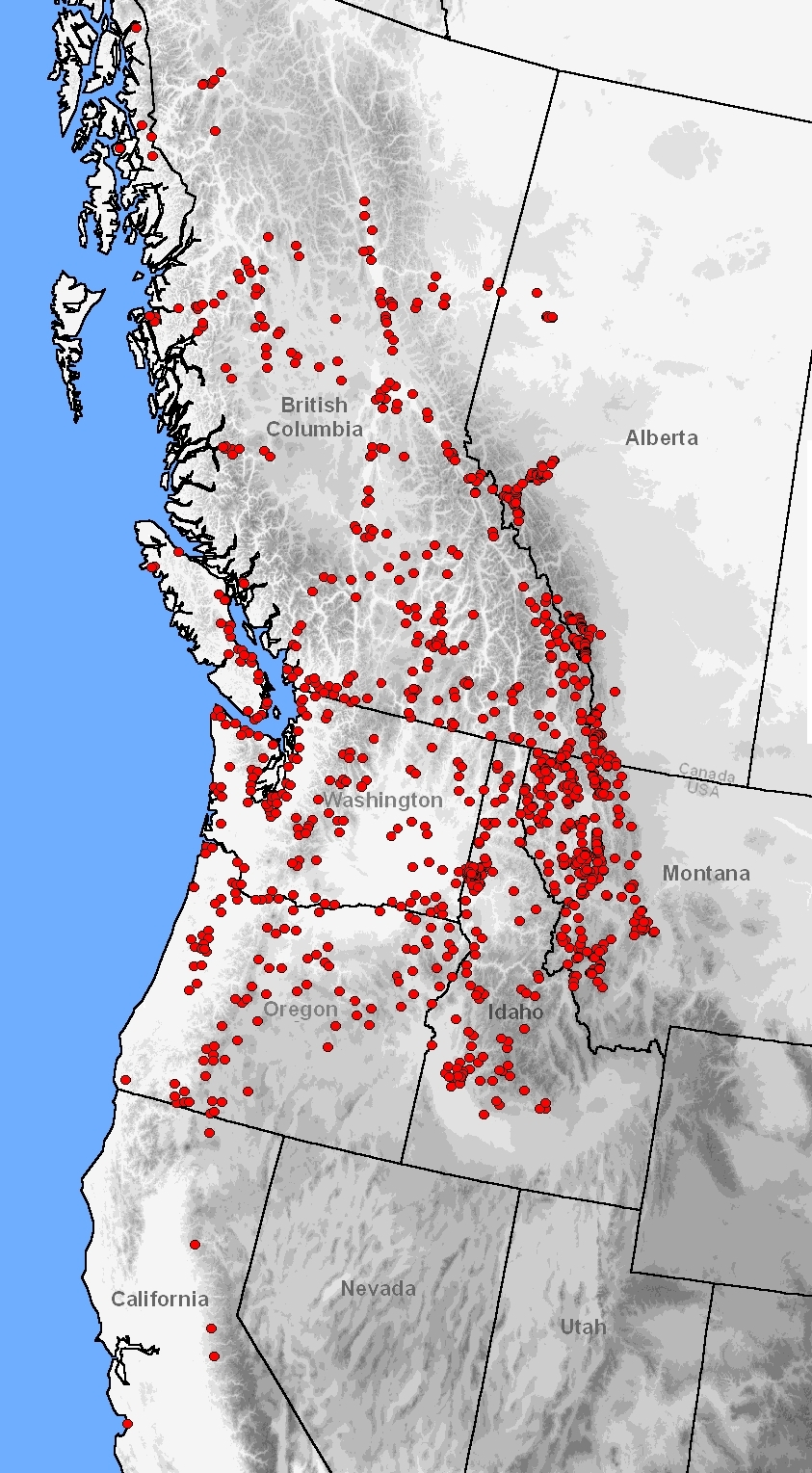
- Distribution of A. macrodactylum (red dots) in western North America

Synonyms
- Ambystoma macrodactyla Baird, 1850 "1849"; Amblystoma Krausei Peters, 1882; Amblystoma epixanthum Cope, 1883; Ambystoma stejnegeri Ruthven, 1912

= Long-toed salamander =

Species of amphibian

The long-toed salamander (Ambystoma macrodactylum) is a mole salamander in the family Ambystomatidae. This species, typically 4.1–8.9 cm (1.6–3.5 in) long when mature, is characterized by its mottled black, brown, and yellow pigmentation, and its long outer fourth toe on the hind limbs. Analysis of fossil records, genetics, and biogeography suggest A. macrodactylum and A. laterale are descended from a common ancestor that gained access to the western Cordillera with the loss of the mid-continental seaway toward the Paleocene.

The distribution of the long-toed salamander is primarily in the Pacific Northwest, with an altitudinal range of up to 2,800 m (9,200 ft). It lives in a variety of habitats, including temperate rainforests, coniferous forests, montane riparian zones, sagebrush plains, red fir forests, semiarid sagebrush, cheatgrass plains, and alpine meadows along the rocky shores of mountain lakes. It lives in slow-moving streams, ponds, and lakes during its aquatic breeding phase. The long-toed salamander hibernates during the cold winter months, surviving on energy reserves stored in the skin and tail.

The five subspecies have different genetic and ecological histories, phenotypically expressed in a range of color and skin patterns. Although the long-toed salamander is classified as a species of Least Concern by the IUCN, many forms of land development threaten and negatively affect the salamander's habitat.

== Taxonomy ==
Ambystoma macrodactylum is a member of the Ambystomatidae, also known as the mole salamanders. The Ambystomatidae originated approximately 81 million years ago (late Cretaceous) from its sister taxon Dicamptodontidae. The Ambystomatidae are also members of suborder Salamandroidea, which includes all the salamanders capable of internal fertilization. The sister species to A. macrodactylum is A. laterale, distributed in eastern North America. However, the species-level phylogeny for Ambystomatidae is tentative and in need of further testing.

== Systematics and biogeography ==
=== Evolutionary origins ===
The ancestral origins for this species stem from eastern North America, where species richness of ambystomatids are highest. The following biogeographic interpretation on the origins of A. macrodactylum into western North America is based on a descriptive account of fossils, genetics, and biogeography. The long-toed salamander's closest living sister species is A. laterale, a native to northeastern North America. Ambystomatidae was isolated to the southeast of the mid-Continental or Western Interior Seaway during the Cretaceous (~145.5–66 Ma). While three other species of the Ambystomatidae (A. tigrinum, A. californiense, and A. gracile) have overlapping ranges in western North America, the long-toed salamander's closest living sister species is A. laterale, a native to northeastern North America. It has been suggested that A. macrodactylum speciated from A. laterale after the Paleocene (~66–55.8 Ma) with the loss of the Western Interior Seaway opening an access route for a common ancestor into the Western Cordillera. Once situated in the montane regions of western North America, species had to contend with a dynamic spatial and compositional ecology responding to the changes in altitude, as mountains grew and the climate changed. For example, the Pacific Northwest became cooler in the Paleocene, paving the way for temperate forest to replace the warmer tropical forest of the Cretaceous. A scenario for the splitting of A. macrodacylum and other western temperate species from their eastern counterparts involves Rocky Mountain uplift in the late Oligocene into the Miocene. The orogeny created a climatic barrier by removing moisture from the westerly air stream and dried the midcontinental area, from southern Alberta to the Gulf of Mexico.

Ancestors of contemporary salamanders were likely able to disperse and migrate into habitats of the Rocky Mountains and surrounding areas by the Eocene. Mesic forests were established in western North America by the mid Eocene and attained their contemporary range distributions by the early Pliocene. The temperate forest valleys and montane environments of these time periods (Paleogene to Neogene) would have provided the physiographic and ecological features supporting analogs of contemporary Ambystoma macrodactylum habitats. The Cascade Range rose during the mid Pliocene and created a rain shadow effect causing the xerification of the Columbia Basin and also altered ranges of temperate mesic ecosystems at higher elevations. The rise of the Cascades causing the xerification of the Columbia Basin is a major biogeographic feature of western North America that divided many species, including A. macrodactylum, into coastal and inland lineages.

=== Subspecies ===
There are five subspecies of long-toed salamander. The subspecies are discerned by their geographic location and patterns in their dorsal stripe; Denzel Ferguson gives a biogeographic account of skin patterns, morphology; based on this analysis, he introduced two new subspecies: A. macrodactylum columbianum and A. m. sigillatum. The ranges of subspecies are illustrated in Robert Stebbin's amphibian field guides.

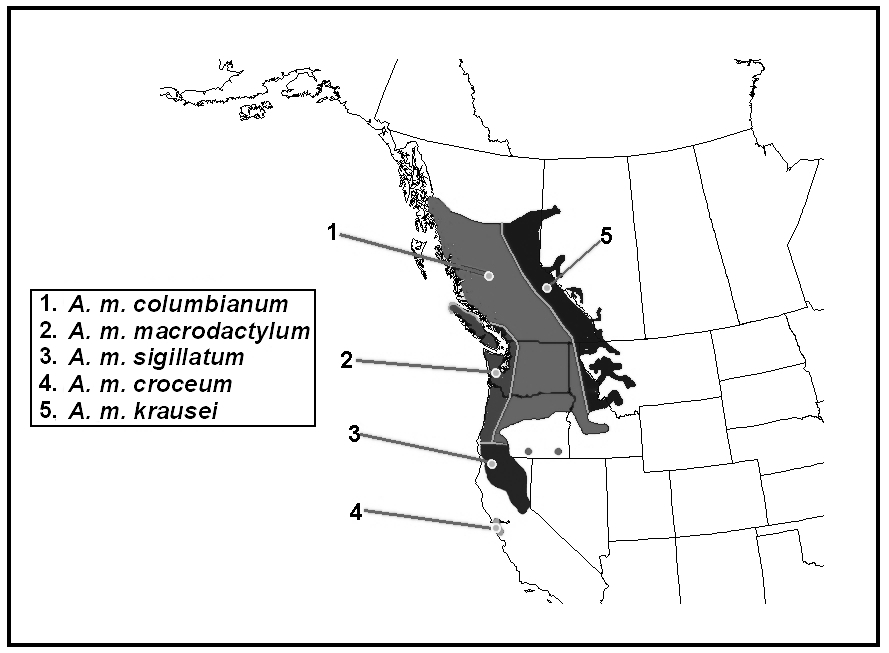
Range of A. macrodactylum and ranges of sub-species distributions.

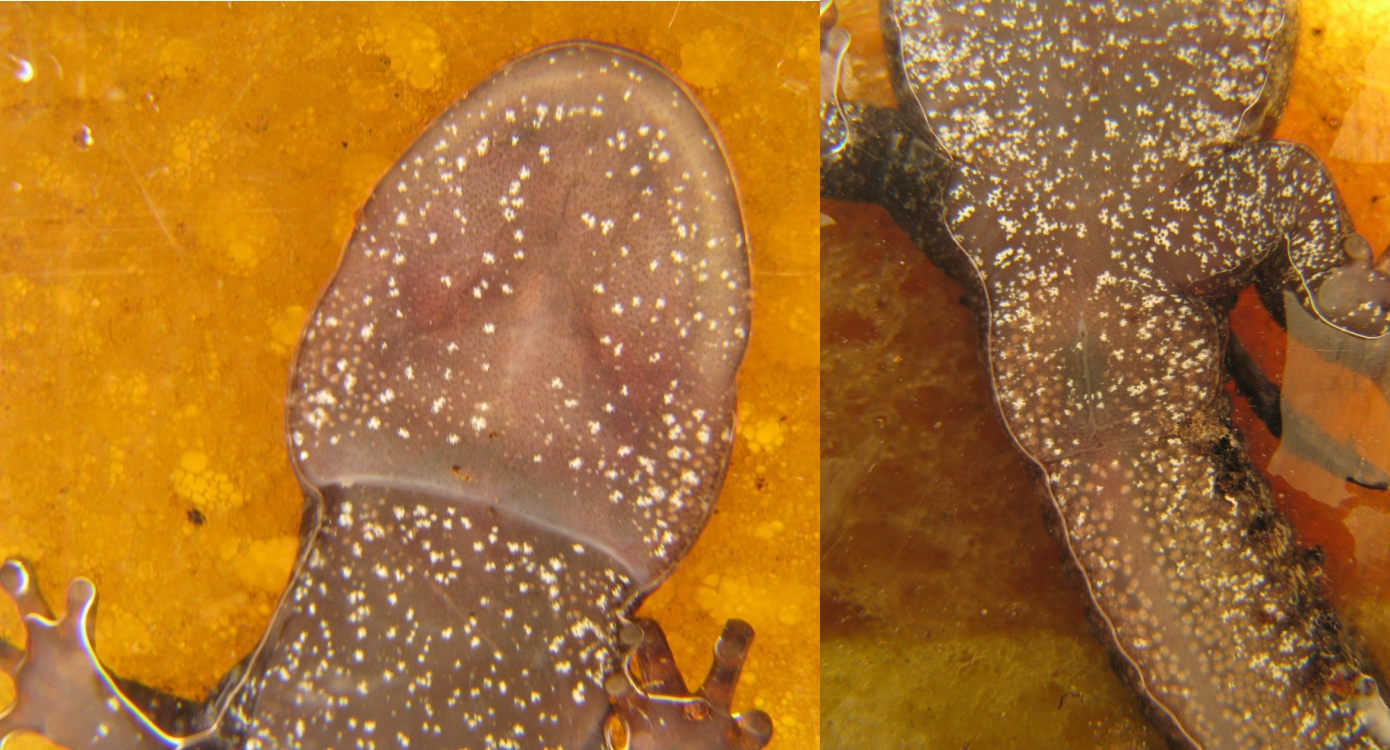
Left: On the dorsal underside under its snout are chin glands that release hormones when males rub against females. These are located under the white flecks. Right: The male vent (excretory and reproductive opening) area has an enlarged anatomy and papillae (pictured). The female vent is not so large and often smoother without papillae folds.

=== Physical appearance (phenotypes) ===
Summary of distinguishing skin patterns and morphological features for the subspecies include:

A. m. croceum
Orange dorsal color on tail breaking into patches along black body and into tiny dots on head, often absent anterior to eyes. Sides have whitish flecks. Number of costal grooves equals 13.
A. m. columbianum
Yellow to tan dorsal stripe on black body, continuous blotches to spots along body ending in narrowed blotches with spot patterns distributed on the head. White flecks along the sides and underside remaining as separate small flecks. Number of vomerine teeth greater than 35.
A. m. krausei
Yellow to tan dorsal stripe, continuous blotches to spots along body ending in widened blotches with spot patterns distributed on the head. White flecks along the sides and underside remaining as separate small flecks. Number of vomerine teeth equaling 32. Number of costal grooves equals 12.
A. m. sigillatum
Wax yellow to tan dorsal stripe forming spotty to irregular shaped blotches along body ending in dots or specks of dorsal color on head. Number of vomerine teeth equals 44. Number of costal grooves equals 13.
A. m. macrodactylum
Citrine, dull citrine, to tan dorsal stripe that is diffuse and continuous along grayish body. Pattern ending in diffuse specks of stripe color or absent on head and snout. White flecks on sides sometimes coming together to form larger flecks. Number of vomerine teeth equaling 33, forming a distinguished transverse arc. Number of costal grooves equals 13.

=== Biogeography and genetics ===
Mitochondrial DNA analysis identifies somewhat different ranges for the subspecies lineages. The genetic analysis, for example, identifies an additional pattern of deep divergence in the eastern part of the range. The spatial distribution of populations and genetics of this species links spatially and historically through the interconnecting mountain and temperate valley systems of western North America. The breeding fidelity of long-toed salamanders (philopatry) and other migratory behaviours reduce rates of dispersal among regions, such as within mountain basins. This aspect of their behavior restricts gene flow and increases the degree and rates of genetic differentiation. Genetic differentiation among regions is higher in the long-toed salamander than measured in most other vertebrate groups. Natural breaks in the range of dispersal and migration occur where ecosystems grade into drier xeric low-lands (such as prairie climates) and at frozen or harsher terrain at high elevation extremes (2,200 meters (7,200 ft)).

A. m. columbianum
Genetic evidence for the 'central' subspecies (A. m. columbianum) suggests that it does not extend north into British Columbia, but is restricted to the Blue and Wallowa Mountains of central to northeastern sections of Oregon. Populations are restricted to these areas by the Snake River Canyon (Idaho) to the east and low dry or xeric lands in the Madras basin to the west.
A. m. macrodactylum
The 'coastal' or 'western' subspecies (A. m. macrodactylum) lineage extends north from northeastern California, across the Klamath Siskiyou Range, through the Willamette Valley, along the coastal mountain ranges, including the Cascade Mountains, and continuing north through British Columbia and up into Alaska.
A. m. croceum
The Santa Cruz long-toed salamander (A. m. croceum) is most closely related to the 'coastal' or 'western' subspecies. This conclusion is the most parsimonious biogeographic explanation with nearest populations of A. m. macrodactylum separated by approximately 300 km across the Sacramento-San Joaquin River Delta, California. The isolated endemic populations are listed as an endangered subspecies. Based on the biogeography and molecular clock calibrations, this subspecies may have been separated from the remainder of the distribution since the Miocene, molecular clock calibrations estimating 13.9 million years of separation.
A. m. krausei
The 'eastern' subspecies (A. m. krausei) range is distributed throughout the interior mountains, with the western extent of its range encroaching into the low-land areas of the central interior plateau of Washington and British Columbia and the eastern extent of its range pushing through Rocky Mountain valleys into the lowland foothills and prairies of Montana and Alberta.
A. m. sigillatum
The traditional 'southern' subspecies (A. m. sigillatum) does not register a mitochondrial genetic identity. This subspecies was identified by Ferguson as forming an intergrade with A. m. columbianum in south central Oregon.

Thompson and Russell found another evolutionary lineage that originates in a glacially restricted area of the Salmon River Mountains, Idaho. With the arrival of the Holocene interglacial, approximately 10,000 years ago, the Pleistocene glaciers receded and opened a migratory path linking these southern populations to northern areas where they currently overlap with A. m. krausei and co-migrated north into the Peace River (Canada) Valley. Ferguson also noted an intergradation in the same geographic area, but between the morphological subspecies A. m. columbianum and A. m. krausei that run parallel to the Bitterroot and Selkirk ranges. Thompson and Russell suggest that this contact zone is between two different subspecies lineages because the A. m. columbianum lineage is geographically isolated and restricted to the central Oregon Mountains.

== Description ==
The body of the long-toed salamander is dusky black with a dorsal stripe of tan, yellow, or olive-green. This stripe can also be broken up into a series of spots. The sides of the body can have fine white or pale blue flecks. The belly is dark-brown or sooty in color with white flecks. Root tubercles are present, but they are not quite as developed as other species, such as the tiger salamander.

The eggs of this species look similar to those of the related northwestern salamander (A. gracile) and tiger salamander (A. tigrinum). Like many amphibians, the eggs of the long-toed salamander are surrounded by a gelatinous capsule. This capsule is transparent, making the embryo visible during development. Unlike A. gracile eggs, there are no visible signs of green algae, which makes egg jellies green in color. When in its egg, the long-toed salamander embryo is darker on top and whiter below compared to a tiger salamander embryo that is light brown to grey above and cream-colored on the bottom. The eggs are about 2 mm (0.08 in) or greater in diameter with a wide outer jelly layer. Prior to hatching—both in the egg and as newborn larvae—they have balancers, which are thin skin protrusions sticking out the sides and supporting the head. The balancers eventually fall off and their external gills grow larger. Once the balancers are lost the larvae are distinguished by the sharply pointed flaring of the gills. As the larvae mature and metamorphose, their limbs with digits become visible and the gills are resorbed.

The skin of a larva is mottled with black, brown, and yellow pigmentation. Skin color changes as the larvae develop and pigment cells migrate and concentrate in different regions of the body. The pigment cells, called chromatophores, are derived from the neural crest. The three types of pigment chromatophores in salamanders include yellow xanthophores, black melanophores, and silvery iridiophores (or guanophores). As the larvae mature, the melanophores concentrate along the body and provide the darker background. The yellow xanthophores arrange along the spine and on top of the limbs. The rest of the body is flecked with reflective iridiophores along the sides and underneath.

As larvae metamorphose, they develop digits from their limb bud protrusions. A fully metamorphosed long-toed salamander has four digits on the front limbs and five digits on the rear limbs. Its head is longer than it is wide, and the long outer fourth toe on the hind limb of mature larvae and adults distinguishes this species from others and is also the etymological origin of its specific epithet: macrodactylum (Greek makros = long and daktylos = toe). The adult skin has a dark brown, dark grey, to black background with a yellow, green, or dull red blotchy stripe with dots and spots along the sides. Underneath the limbs, head, and body the salamander is white, pinkish, to brown with larger flecks of white and smaller flecks of yellow. Adults are typically 3.8–7.6 cm (1.5–3.0 in) long.

== Habitat and distribution ==
The long-toed salamander is an ecologically versatile species living in a variety of habitats, ranging from temperate rainforests, coniferous forests, montane riparian, sagebrush plains, red fir forest, semiarid sagebrush, cheatgrass plains, to alpine meadows along the rocky shores of mountain lakes. Adults can be located in forested understory, hiding under coarse woody debris, rocks, and in small mammal burrows. During the spring breeding season, adults can be found under debris or in the shoreline shallows of rivers, streams, lakes, and ponds. Ephemeral waters are often frequented.

This species is one of the most widely distributed salamanders in North America, second only to the tiger salamander. Its altitudinal range runs from sea level up to 2,800 meters (9,200 ft), spanning a wide variety of vegetational zones. The range includes isolated endemic populations in Monterey Bay and Santa Cruz, California. The distribution reconnects in northeastern Sierra Nevada running continuously along the Pacific Coast to Juneau, Alaska, with populations dotted along the Taku and Stikine River valleys. From the Pacific coast, the range extends longitudinally to the eastern foothills of the Rocky Mountains in Montana and Alberta.

== Ecology and life cycle ==
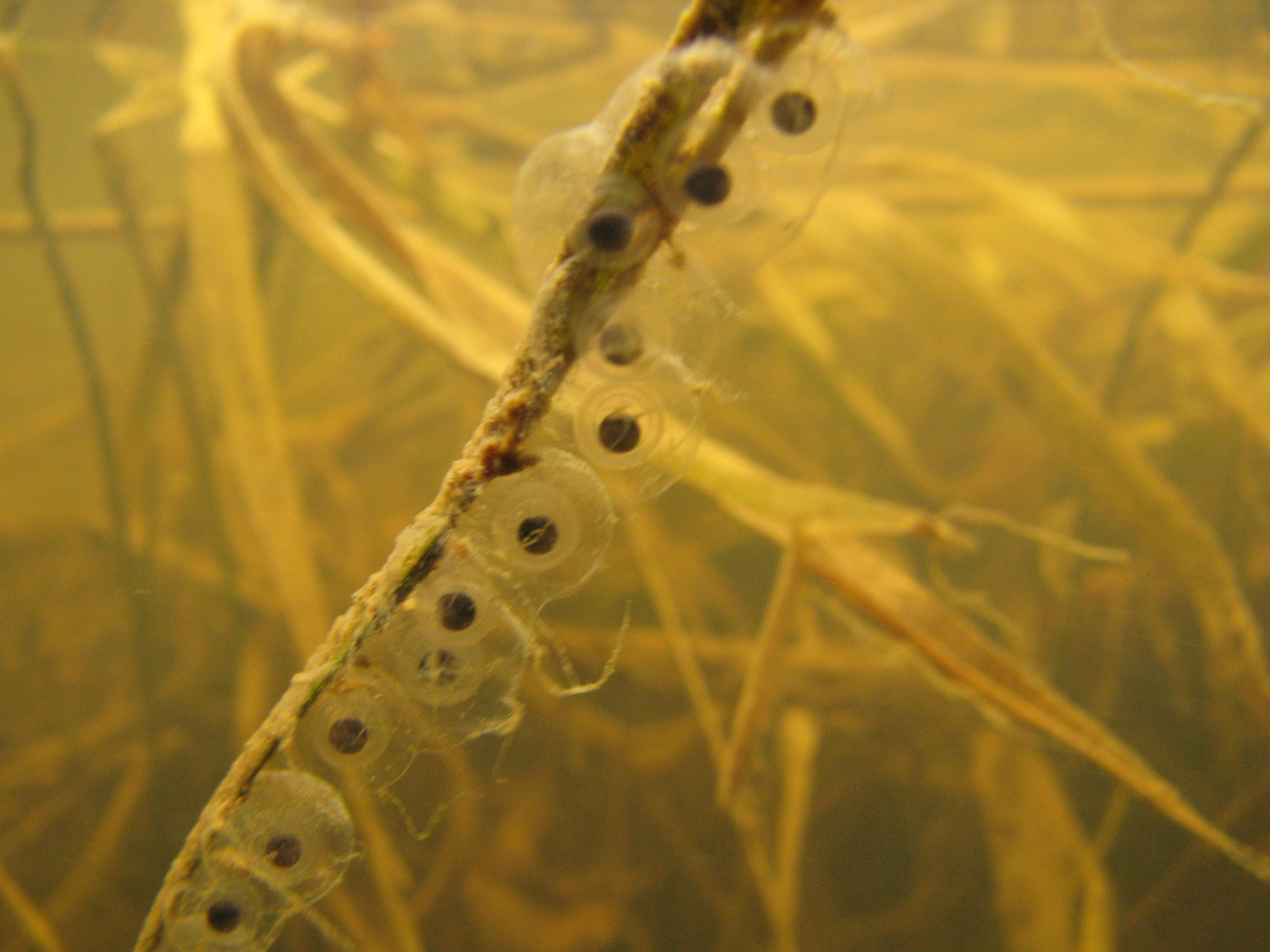
Long-toed salamander egg mass showing outer jelly layer connecting the mass and two inner capsules separating each egg.

=== Eggs ===
Like all amphibians, the life of a long-toed salamander begins as an egg. In the northern extent of its range, the eggs are laid in lumpy masses along grass, sticks, rocks, or the mucky substrate of a calm pond. The number of eggs in a single mass ranges in size, possibly up to 110 eggs per cluster. Females invest a significant amount of resources into egg production, with the ovaries accounting for over 50% of the body mass in the pre-breeding season. A maximum of 264 eggs have been found in a single female—a large number considering each egg is approximately 0.5 millimeters (0.02 in) in diameter. The egg mass is held together by a gelatinous outer layer protecting the outer capsule of individual eggs. The eggs are sometimes laid singly, especially in warmer climates south of the Canada and US border. The egg jellies contribute a yearly supply of biological material that supports the chemistry and nutrient dynamics of shallow-water aquatic ecosystems and adjacent forest ecosystems. The eggs also provide habitat for water molds, also known as oomycetes.

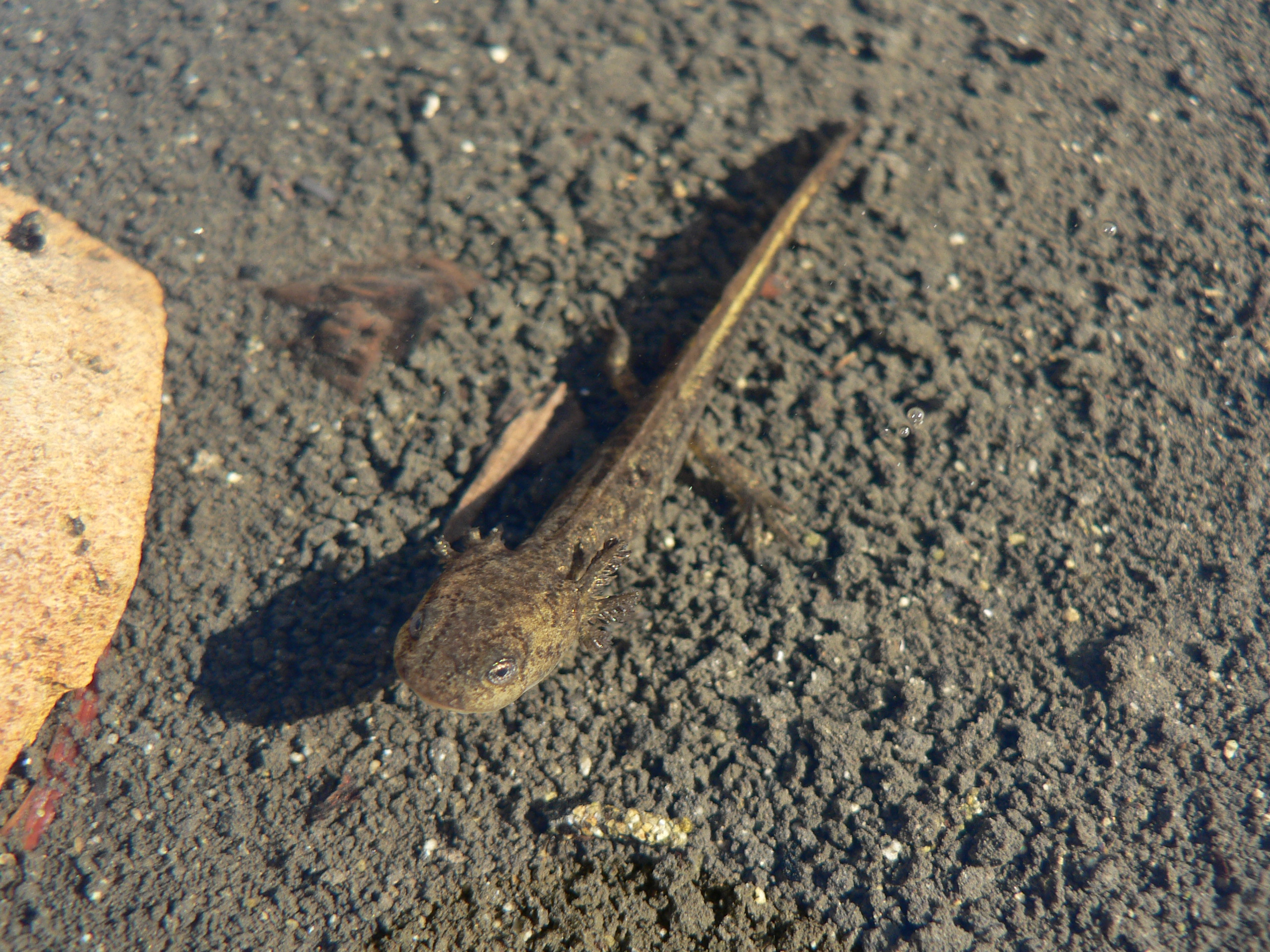
A. m. macrodactylum larva with its eponymous long fourth toes on the rear feet

=== Larvae ===
Larvae hatch from their egg casing in two to six weeks. They are born carnivores, feeding instinctively on small invertebrates that move in their field of vision. Food items include small aquatic crustaceans (cladocerans, copepods and ostracods), aquatic dipterans and tadpoles. As they develop, they naturally feed upon larger prey. To increase their chances for survival, some individuals grow bigger heads and become cannibals, and feed upon their own brood mates.

=== Metamorphosis and juveniles ===
After the larvae grow and mature, for at least one season (the larval period lasts about four months on the Pacific coast), they absorb their gills and metamorphose into terrestrial juveniles that roam the forest undergrowth. Metamorphosis has been reported as early as July at sea level, for A. m. croceum in October to November and even January. At higher elevations the larvae may overwinter, develop, and grow for an extra season before metamorphosing. In lakes at higher elevations, the larvae can reach sizes of 47 millimeters (1.9 in) snout to vent length (SVL) at metamorphosis, but at lower elevations they develop faster and metamorphose when they reach 35–40 millimeters (1.4–1.6 in) SVL.

=== Adults ===
As adults, long-toed salamanders often go unnoticed because they live a subterranean lifestyle digging, migrating, and feeding on the invertebrates in forest soils, decaying logs, small rodent burrows or rock fissures. The adult diet consists of insects, tadpoles, worms, beetles and small fish. Salamanders are preyed upon by garter snakes, small mammals, birds, and fish. An adult may live 6–10 years, with the largest individuals weighing approximately 7.5 grams (0.26 oz), snout to vent lengths reaching 8 cm (3.1 in), and total lengths reaching 14 cm (5.5 in).

== Behaviour ==
=== Seasonal ===
The life history of the long-toed salamander varies greatly with elevation and climate. Seasonal dates of migration to and from the breeding ponds can be correlated with bouts of sustained rainfall, ice thaw, or snow melt sufficient to replenish the (often) seasonal ponds. Eggs may be spawned at low elevations as early as mid-February in southern Oregon, from early January to July in northwestern Washington, from January to March in southeastern Washington, and from mid-April to early May in Waterton Lakes National Park, Alberta. The timing of breeding can be highly variable; of notable mention, several egg masses in early stages of development were found on July 8, 1999 along the British Columbia provincial border outside Jasper, Alberta. Adults migrate seasonally to return to their natal breeding ponds, with males arriving earlier and staying longer than females, and some individuals have been seen migrating along snow banks on warm spring days. Gender differences (or sexual dimorphism) in this species are only apparent during the breeding season, when mature males display an enlarged or bulbous vent area.

=== Breeding ===
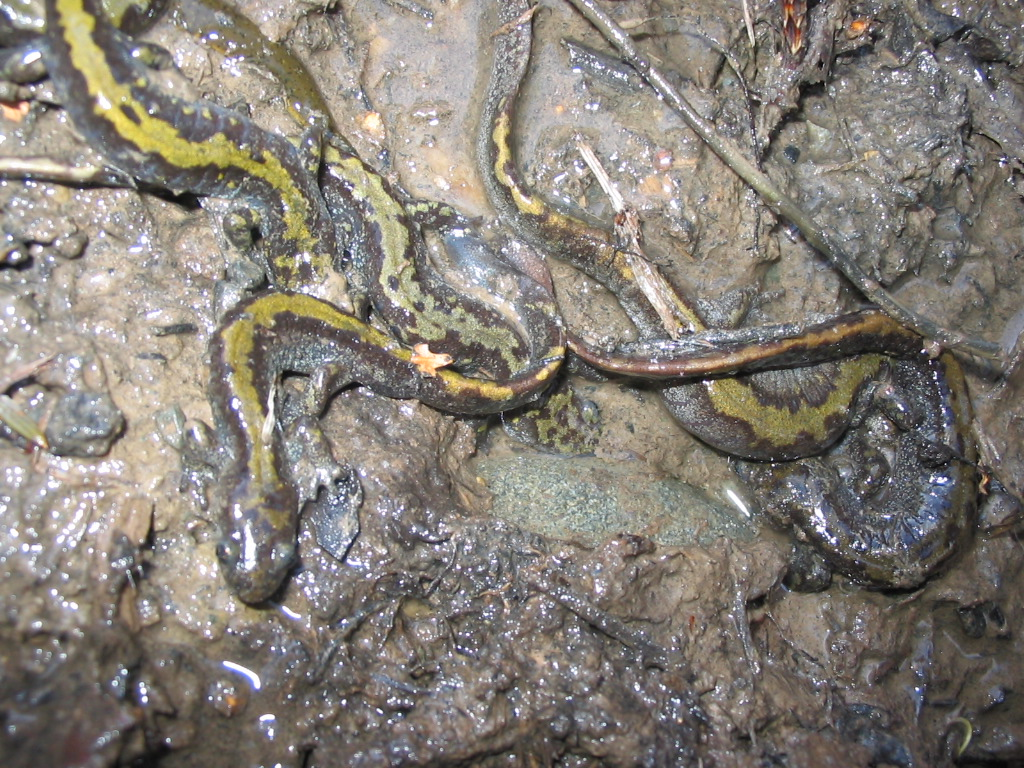
Long-toed salamanders gather during the breeding season under a log immediately near the shore of a pond. Notice the range of drab to bright skin colors.

The time of breeding depends on the elevation and latitude of the salamander's habitat. Generally, the lower-elevation salamanders breed in the fall, winter, and early spring. Higher-elevation salamanders breed in spring and early summer. In the higher climates especially, salamanders will enter ponds and lakes that still have ice floating.

Adults aggregate in large numbers (>20 individuals) under rocks and logs along the immediate edge of the breeding sites and breed explosively over a few days. Suitable breeding sites include small fish-free ponds, marshes, shallow lakes and other still-water wetlands. Like other ambystomatid salamanders, they have evolved a characteristic courtship dance where they rub bodies and release pheromones from their chin gland prior to assuming a copulatory mating position. Once in position, the male deposits a spermatophore, which is a gooey stalk tipped with a packet of sperm, and walks the female forward to be inseminated. Males may mate more than once and may deposit as many as 15 spermatophores over the course of a five-hour period. The courtship dance for the long-toed salamander is similar to other species of Ambystoma and very similar to A. jeffersonianum. In the long-toed salamander, there is no rubbing or head-butting; the males directly approach females and grab on, while the females try to rapidly swim away. The males clasp the female from behind the forelimbs and shake, a behavior called amplexus. Males sometimes clasp other amphibian species during breeding and shake them as well. The male only grabs with the front limbs and never uses his hind limbs during the courtship dance as he rubs his chin side to side pressing down on the female's head. The female struggles but later becomes subdued. Males increase the tempo and motions, rubbing over the female's nostrils, sides, and sometimes the vent. When the female becomes quite docile the male moves forward with his tail positioned over her head, raised, and waving at the tip. If the female accepts the males courtship, the male directs her snout toward his vent region while both move forward stiffly with pelvic undulations. As the female follows, the male stops and deposits a spermatophore, and the female will move forward with the male to raise her tail and receive the sperm packet. The full courtship dance is rarely accomplished in the first attempt. Females deposit their eggs a few days after mating.

=== Energy storage and defense mechanisms ===
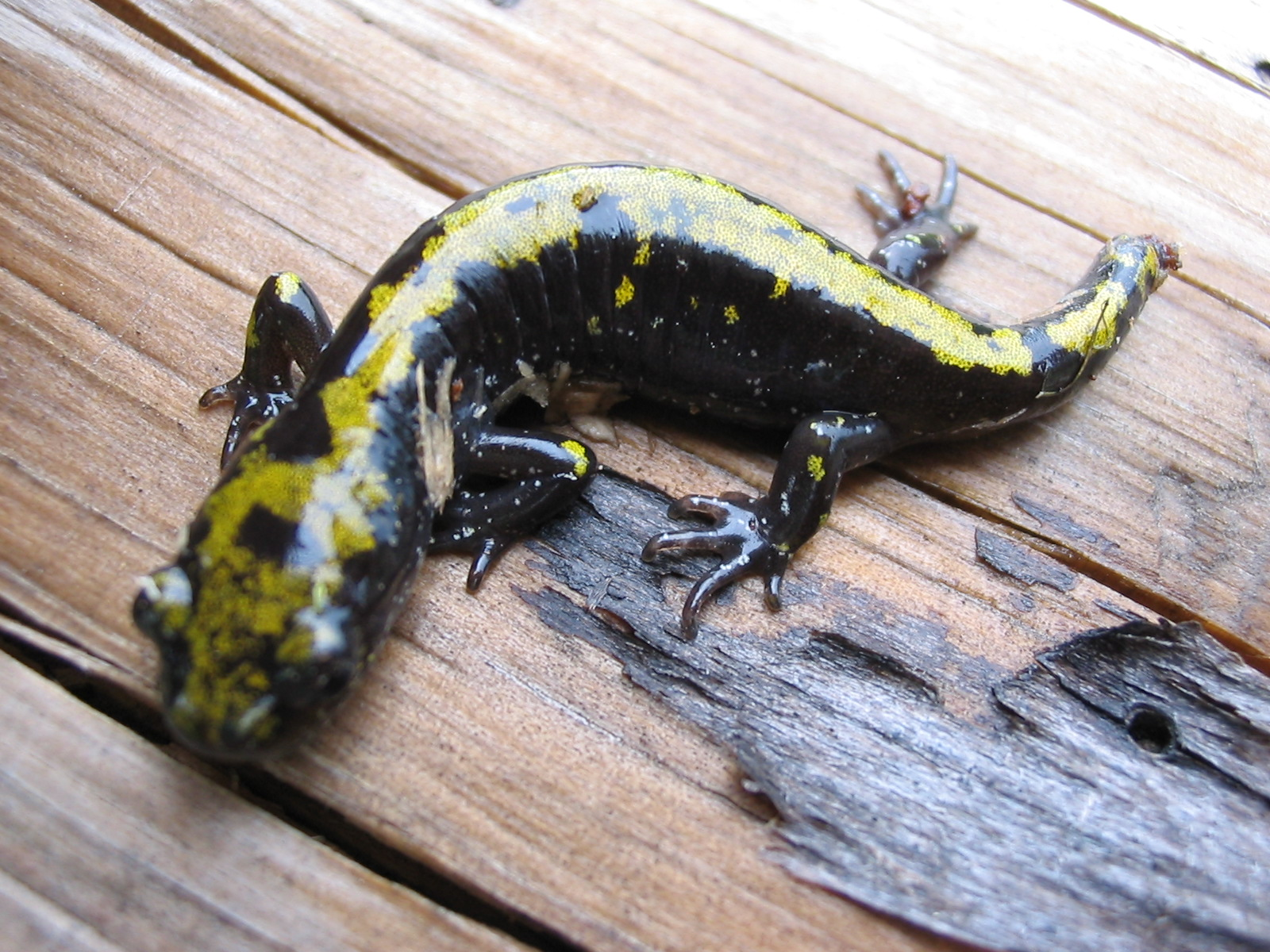
Long-toed salamander showing an autotomized tail stub

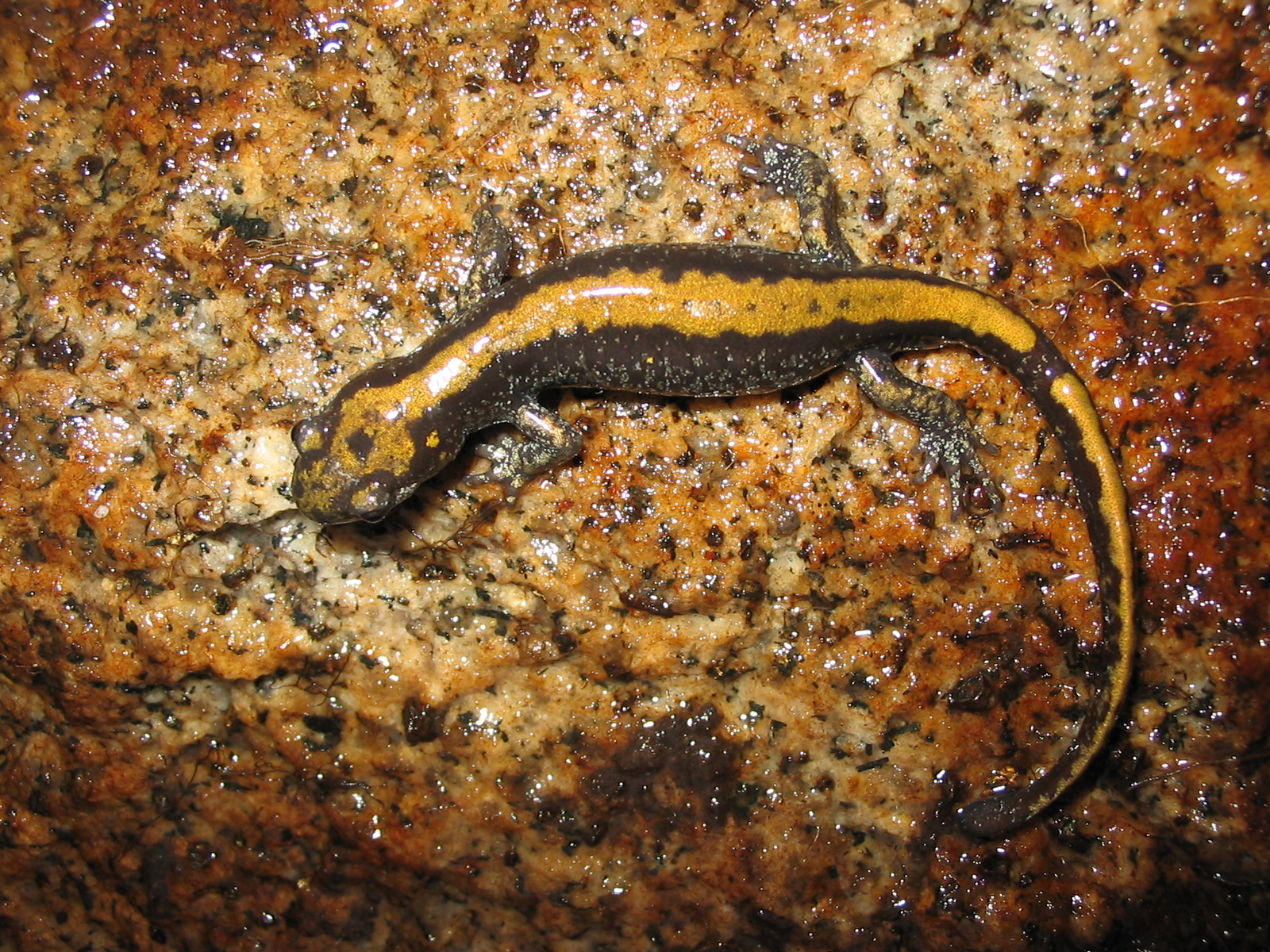
Long-toed salamander showing markings for tail regrowth after loss

In some lowland areas the adult salamanders will remain active all winter long, excluding cold spells. However, during the cold winter months in the northern parts of its range, the long-toed salamander burrows below the frost-line in a coarse substrate to hibernate in clusters of 8–14 individuals. While hibernating, it survives on protein energy reserves that are stored in its skin and along its tail. These proteins serve a secondary function as part of a mixture or concoction of skin secretions that is used for defense. When threatened, the long-toed salamander will wave its tail and secrete an adhesive white milky substance that is noxious and likely poisonous. The color of its skin can serve as a warning to predators (aposematism) that it will taste bad. Its skin colors and patterns are diverse, ranging from a dark black to reddish brown background that is spotted or blotched by a pale-reddish-brown, pale-green, to a bright yellow stripe. An adult may also drop part of its tail and slink away while the tail bit acts as a squirmy decoy; this is called autotomy. The regeneration and regrowth of the tail is one example of the developmental physiology of amphibians that is of great interest to the medical profession.

== Conservation status ==
While the long-toed salamander is classified as least concern by the IUCN, many forms of land development negatively affect the salamander's habitat and have put new perspectives and priorities into its conservation biology. Conservation priorities focus at the population level of diversity, which is declining at rates ten times that of species extinction. Population level diversity is what provides ecosystem services, such as the keystone role that salamanders play in the soil ecosystems, including the nutrient cycling that supports wetland and forested ecosystems.

Two life-history features of amphibians are often cited as a reason why amphibians are good indicators of environmental health or 'canaries in the coal mine'. Like all amphibians, the long-toed salamander has both an aquatic and terrestrial life transition and semipermeable skin. Since they serve different ecological functions in the water than they do in land, the loss of one amphibian species is equivalent to the loss of two ecological species. The second notion is that amphibians, such as long-toed salamanders, are more susceptible to the absorption of pollutants because they naturally absorb water and oxygen through their skin. The validity of this special sensitivity to environmental pollutants, however, has been called into question. The problem is more complex, because not all amphibians are equally susceptible to environmental damage because there is such a diverse array of life histories among species.

Long-toed salamander populations are threatened by fragmentation, introduced species, and UV radiation. Forestry, roads, and other land developments have altered the environments that amphibians migrate to, and have increased mortality. Places such as Waterton Lakes National Park have installed a road tunnel underpass to allow safe passage and to sustain the migration ecology of the species. The distribution of the long-toed salamander overlaps extensively with the forestry industry, a dominant resource supporting the economy of British Columbia and the western United States. Long-toed salamanders will alter migration behaviour and are affected negatively by forestry practices not offering sizable management buffers and protections for the smaller wetlands where salamanders breed. Populations near the Peace River Valley, Alberta, have been lost to the clearing and draining of wetlands for agriculture. Trout introduced for the sport fisheries into once fishless lakes are also destroying long-toed salamander populations. Introduced goldfish prey on the eggs and larvae of long-toed salamanders. Increased exposure to UVB radiation is another factor being implicated in the global decline of amphibians and the long-toed salamander is also susceptible to this threat, which increases the incidence of deformities and reduces their survival and growth rates.

The subspecies Ambystoma macrodactylum croceum (Santa Cruz Long-toed Salamander) is of particular concern and it was afforded protections in 1967 under the US Endangered Species Act. This subspecies lives in a narrow range of habitat in Santa Cruz County and Monterey County, California. Prior to receiving protections, some few remaining populations were threatened by development. The subspecies is ecologically unique, having unique and irregular skin patterns on its back, a unique moisture tolerance, and it is also an endemic that is geographically isolated from the rest of the species range. Other subspecies include A. m. columbianum, A. m. krausei, A. m. macrodactylum and A. m. sigillatum.

== See also ==
- Santa Cruz long-toed salamander, an endangered subspecies
