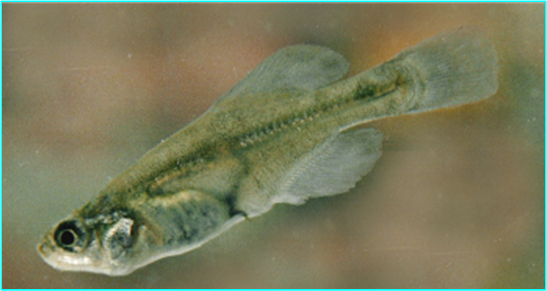

Conservation status
- Endangered (IUCN 3.1)

Scientific classification
- Kingdom: Animalia
- Phylum: Chordata
- Class: Actinopterygii
- Order: Cyprinodontiformes
- Family: Goodeidae
- Genus: Girardinichthys
- Species: G. viviparus

Binomial name
- Girardinichthys viviparus (Bustamante, 1837)

Synonyms
- Cyprinus viviparus Bustamante, 1837; Girardinichthys innominatus Bleeker, 1860

= Chapultepec splitfin =

Species of fish

The Chapultepec splitfin (Girardinichthys viviparus), known locally as mexcalpique, is a critically endangered species of fish in the family Goodeidae. It is endemic to Mexico and was originally restricted to lakes and wetlands in the Valley of Mexico, including Lake Texcoco. Through man-made channels it was able to spread to the upper Pánuco River basin (notably Tula River and associated reservoirs). Most native populations disappeared as they were at or near Mexico City, with the waters either being reclaimed, drained, heavily polluted or infested with introduced species. Today the Chapultepec splitfin is only known to survive in three lakes (Viejo, Menor and Mayor) in the Chapultepec park of Mexico City, Lake Xochimilco, Lake Zumpango, Laguna de Tecocomulco northeast of the City where perhaps introduced, and parts of the Pánuco River basin. Most of these remaining populations are small. This species was originally described as Cyprinus viviparus in 1837 by Miguel Bustamante y Septién with the type locality given as "Mexico". In 1860 Pieter Bleeker raised the genus Girardinichthys with a new species Girardinichthys viviparus as its type species, this subsequently proved to be a taxonomy of Cyprinus viviparus.

== Diet ==
The Chapultepec Splitfin is a carnivorous species, possessing small, sharp teeth and an uncoiled intestine that is about body length. It is likely that the species feeds on mosquito larvae and other small insects that make contact with the water's surface.

== Environment ==
The Chapultepec Splitfin is a freshwater fish native and endemic to Distrito Federal and Mexico. It is believed that during the Aztec empire, this species could have occupied the Lago de Texcoco as well as other connected waterbodies. In the present day, due to the drainage of wetlands and lakes Girardinichthys viviparus is only found in the remnants of these bodies of water. Populations can be found in the Parque de Chapultepec, Lago Mayor, Zumpango, Xochimilco, and Alameda Oriente. The historical range of the species has been estimated to have declined by over 65%.

== Sexual Dimorphism ==
Males and females are morphologically different. In males, the splitfin and dorsal fin are significantly bigger than that of the females. Coloration differences also occur and become more distinct during courtship. Females are silvery and have a darker upper-half of the body. Males are silvery and can be marbled blackish grey. Their unpaired fins are dark and get darker or turn completely black during courtship.

== Reproduction ==
Based on the collection of young fish for research, it is believed that there is breeding taking place all year round, excluding the coldest months. The first fry are usually born around February and this continues to around October. The gestation period is approximately 55 days. Females give birth to about 25 young at a time.

== Threats ==
The continued development of housing, urban areas, commercial, and industrial areas in Mexico City are contributing to the destruction of the habitat of the Chapultepec Splitfin. The population located at Alameda Oriente could be impacted by possible expansion of the nearby airport. Water pollution, water treatment, and parasites directly threaten the species. Heavy metals in wastewater pose an especial threat. The fish are also used as a food source for people in Mexico City.

== Conservation ==
There are no active, targeted conservation efforts for this species. A monitoring and ex-situ breeding project is being run by the Laboratorio de Biologia Acuatica in Michoacan University, Morelia, Mexico is the only conservation effort.
