= Allotoca maculata =

Conservation status
- Critically Endangered (IUCN 3.1)

Scientific classification
- Kingdom: Animalia
- Phylum: Chordata
- Class: Actinopterygii
- Order: Cyprinodontiformes
- Family: Goodeidae
- Genus: Allotoca
- Species: A. maculata

Binomial name
- Allotoca maculata M. L. Smith & R. R. Miller, 1980

Species of fish

The blackspot allotoca (Allotoca maculata), also known as the blackspot goodeid, tailspot goodeid, or tiro manchado, is a critically endangered species of fish in the family Goodeidae, endemic to the Lago de Magdalena basin near Guadalajara in Jalisco, Mexico.
