= Allotoca meeki =

Conservation status
- Critically Endangered (IUCN 3.1)

Scientific classification
- Kingdom: Animalia
- Phylum: Chordata
- Class: Actinopterygii
- Order: Cyprinodontiformes
- Family: Goodeidae
- Genus: Allotoca
- Species: A. meeki

Binomial name
- Allotoca meeki (Álvarez, 1959)

Synonyms
- Neoophorus meeki Álvarez, 1959

Species of fish

Allotoca meeki, commonly known as the Zirahuen allotoca or the tiro de Zirahuén, is a species of fish endemic to Lake Zirahuén, a small endorheic mountain lake in Michoacán state of central Mexico.

The specific name honours the American ichthyologist Seth Eugene Meek (1859-1914) who wrote the first review of the fishes of Mexico.

== Conservation ==
The Zirahuén allotoca is critically endangered. The species has a small range, limited to a single lake basin. Two non-native predatory species of bass (Micropterus salmoides and M. punctulatus) were introduced to Lake Zirahuén in 1933, and by the 1990s the allotoca had been extirpated from the lake.

A population survived in the Estanque de Condempas in Opopeo, a small lake on the Río El Silencio tributary of Lake Zirahuén. Bass invaded the estanque in the 2000s, and by 2011 no allotocas could be found there. As of 2017 a few allotocas have survived in an outlet of the lake, and in a nearby spring-fed pond where bass are also found.
