= James D. Anderson =

American herpetologist (1930–1976)

- Anderson at a KOA campsite
- Born: August 16, 1930; Newark, New Jersey, U.S.
- Died: November 20, 1976 (aged 46); Summit, New Jersey, U.S.
- Education: Rutgers University
- Scientific career
- Fields: Herpetology
- Doctoral advisor: Robert C. Stebbins

James Donald Anderson, Jr. (August 16, 1930 – November 20, 1976) was an American herpetologist with the American Museum of Natural History and professor of zoology at Rutgers University who did extensive fieldwork studying Ambystoma and other salamander species in Mexico. He was born in Newark, New Jersey, on August 16, 1930, and grew up in the nearby town of Belleville. He attended the Rutgers University–Newark College of Arts and Sciences and earned a B.A. in zoology in 1954. From 1954 to 1960 he was a graduate student at UC Berkeley, working under Robert C. Stebbins. Anderson returned to Rutgers University–Newark as a faculty member in 1960, and died from injuries sustained in a car accident on November 20, 1976. Anderson's salamander (Ambystoma andersoni) is named after him.

== Early life ==
He was born on 16 August 1930 in Newark, New Jersey, just west of New York City, where he lived his entire life outside of his graduate studies in California. He spent his childhood in Belleville, a northern suburb of Newark. After graduating from high school, Anderson worked as a docent at the Newark Museum, an institution that spawned the careers of several professional herpetologists.

== Education and Dissertation ==
He attended the Newark campus of Rutgers University before attending the University of California at Berkeley. He was a graduate student of Robert C. Stebbins and conducted a comparative study of the coastal and montane populations of the Long-toed Salamander (Ambystoma macrodactylum) for his dissertation. In addition to his dissertation, Anderson worked as an Acting Curator in the Museum of Vertebrate Zoology and held other posts as an Instructor and research assistant. While at Berkeley, he also conducted studies on the thermal ecology of desert lizards and studies on the zoogeography of Sierra del Nido, Chihuahua, Mexico.

== Career ==
After completing his doctorate, Anderson returned to his alma mater as an Assistant Professor of Zoology in 1960 and was promoted to full professor in 1968. Despite his abbreviated career, Anderson authored over 50 herpetological papers. His research focused on the systematics, distribution, ecology, and behavior of the salamanders of the United States and Mexico. He named new subspecies in the genera Ambystoma, Crotalus, and Eumeces (now Plestiodon). He completed a study of the herpetofauna of the Mexican state of Aguascalientes, and also published on other herpetological collections from the northern and western regions of Mexico. He also studied the body temperatures, egg laying, nesting, and pattern polymorphisms in spiny lizards (Sceloporus).

He was the principal authority on the biology of ambystomatid salamanders of the United States and Mexico including their food habits, reproduction, larval and adult behavior, temperature preferences and rate of development, phototaxis, breeding seasons, egg-algal relationships, and other aspects of their life history.

Anderson served as editor for the salamander section of the Catalogue of American Amphibians and Reptiles and as herpetology editor for the American Midland Naturalist. He also became a consultant for the New Jersey Division of Fish, Game and Shell Fisheries and the United States Department of the Interior concerning endangered species of amphibians and reptiles. At the time of his death, he and his students were conducting some of the first studies on the ecology, behavior, and conservation of reptiles and amphibians at the nearby Great Swamp National Wildlife Refuge, as well as ecological studies on salamanders in South Carolina, and nesting ecology of sea turtles at Jekyll Island, Georgia.

In addition to his research, Anderson was a nationally award-winning teacher, and his courses in Animal Ecology, Field Studies in Animal Ecology, and Zoology Field Trip were popular. Anderson was also a mentor of both undergraduate and graduate students and had many students who went on to careers in herpetology, behavior, neurophysiology, and conservation biology, among them George Dalrymple, Dawn Hassinger, Mary T. Mendonça, Michael J. Ryan, and Richard A. Seigel.

He published 150 peer-reviewed papers. His two most cited papers are:

- "A Comparison of the Food Habits of Ambystoma macrodactylum sigillatum, Ambystoma macrodactylum croceum, and Ambystoma tigrinum californiense". Herpetologica 24 (4) (Dec., 1968): 273–284. (cited 55 times according to Google Scholar);
- "The Life History of the Mexican Salamander Ambystoma ordinarium Taylor". (with Richard D. Worthington). Herpetologica 27 (2) (Jun., 1971): 165–176. (cited 43 times according to Google Scholar).

== Personal Life and Death ==
On Saturday, 20 November 1976, Anderson presented at the Trailside Museum in Watchung, southwest of Newark, as part of a grass-roots movement against the proposed extension of a highway through the Watchung Reservation. After leaving the event, he was fatally struck while he was stopped at an intersection in Summit, New Jersey. He left two children, Bruce and Susan, and his wife, Lillian.
