= Lake Zirahuén =

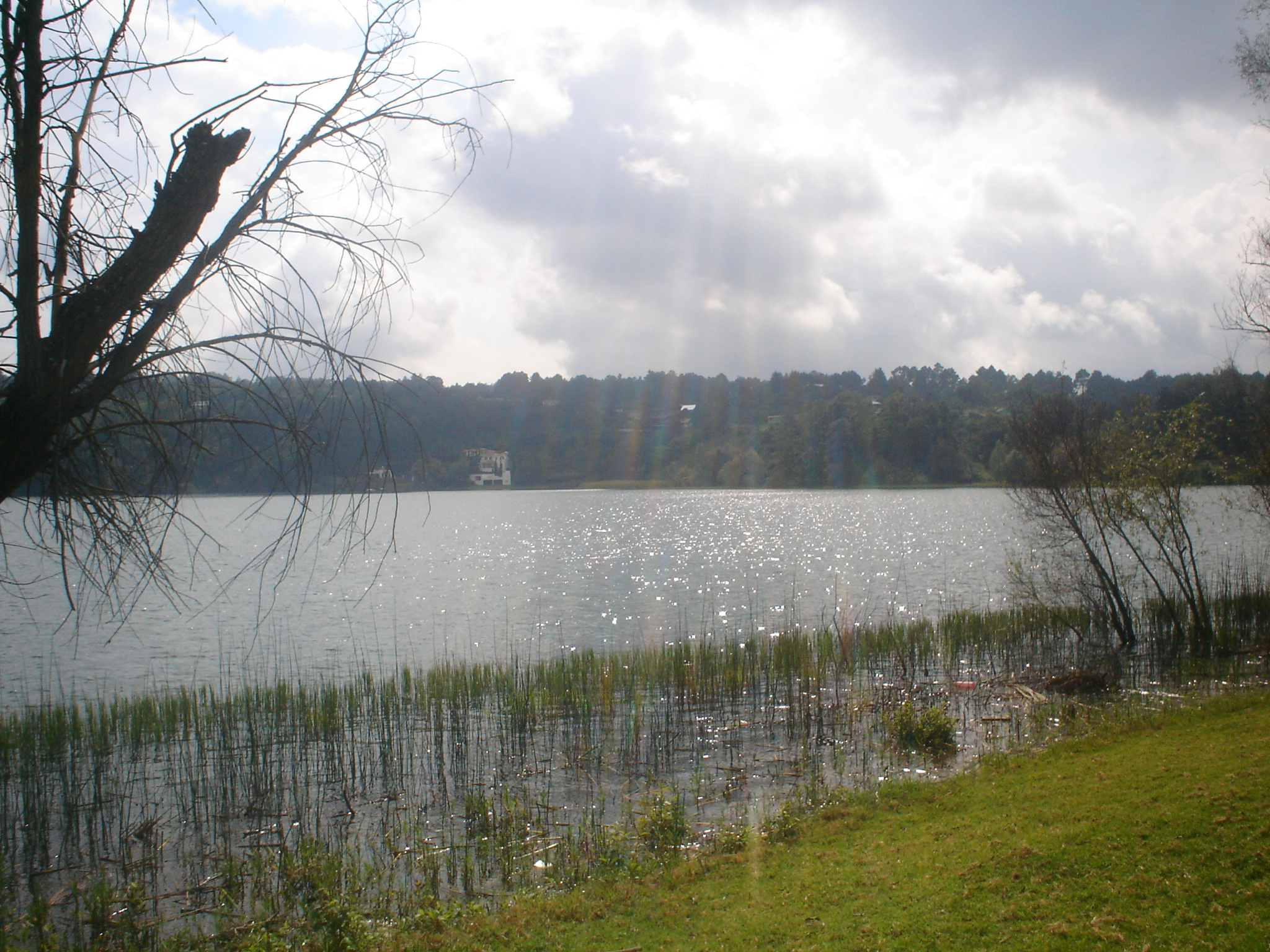
- Lake Zirahuén

- Location within Michoacán Location within Mexico
- Location: Santa Clara del Cobre, Michoacán, Mexico
- Coordinates: 19°27′N 101°44′W
- Type: endorheic lake
- Surface area: 970 hectares (2,400 acres)
- Max. depth: 70 metres (230 ft)
- Water volume: 0.216 cubic kilometres (0.052 cu mi)
- Surface elevation: 2,080 metres (6,820 ft)

Lake Zirahuén is a small endorheic lake in the municipality of Santa Clara del Cobre in Michoacán, Mexico. It is a deep mountain lake with a sandy bottom that is partially covered with mud. It covers an area of 970 hectares (2,400 acres) and has a volume of 0.216 cubic kilometres (0.052 cu mi).

At times Lake Zirahuén has been part of an open and continuous hydrological system together with Lake Cuitzeo and Lake Pátzcuaro, draining into the Lerma River. Today it is a closed basin like Lakes Cuitzeo and Pátzcuaro, although ecologists consider it a sub-basin of the Lerma-Chapala basin.

The Zirahuén allotica (Allotoca meeki), a Goodeid fish, is endemic to Lake Zirahuén.
