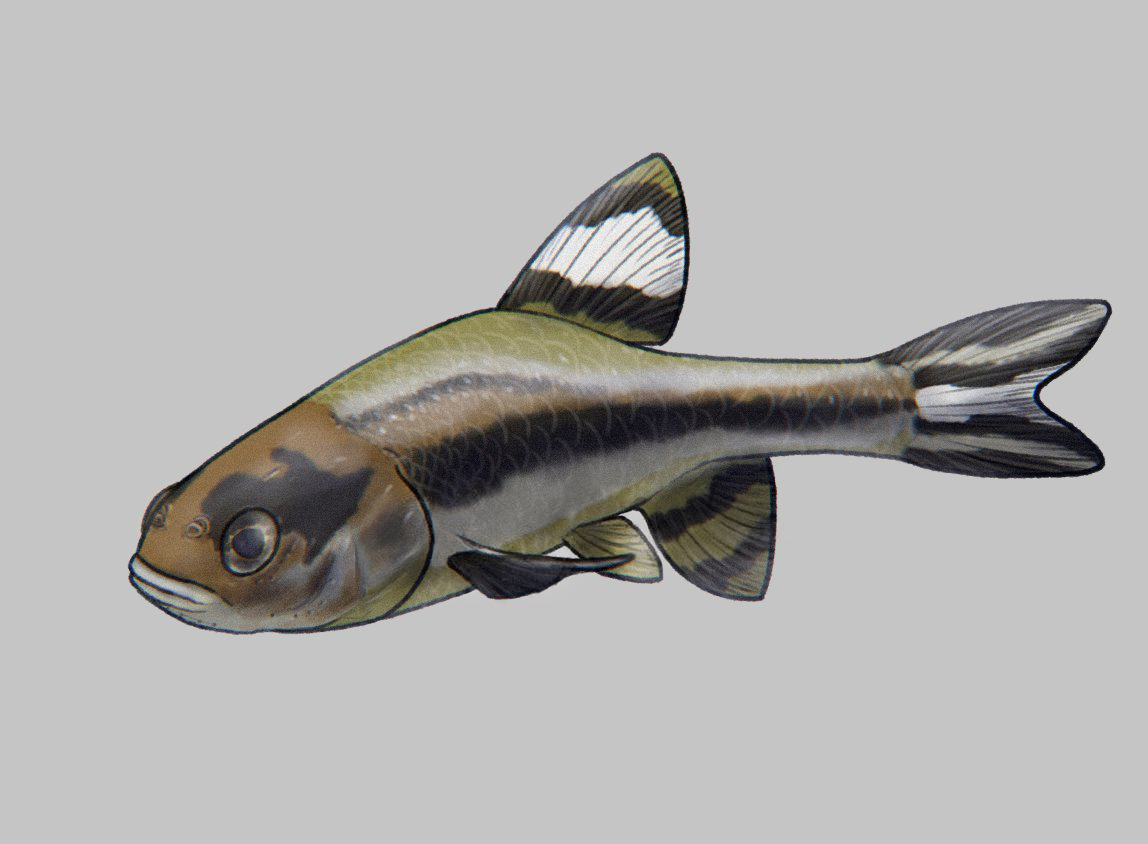
Durango shiner

Conservation status
- Extinct (IUCN 3.1)

Scientific classification
- Kingdom: Animalia
- Phylum: Chordata
- Class: Actinopterygii
- Order: Cypriniformes
- Family: Leuciscidae
- Subfamily: Pogonichthyinae
- Genus: Notropis
- Species: †N. aulidion

Binomial name
- †Notropis aulidion Chernoff & R. R. Miller, 1986

= Durango shiner =

Extinct species of fish

The Durango shiner (Notropis aulidion) was an extinct species of freshwater fish of the family Cyprinidae. It was found only in Mexico. The Durango shiner was native to the Rio Tunal, which forms the headwaters of the San Pedro Mezquital River, a Pacific slope river rising near Durango City, Durango, Mexico (Chernoff and Miller 1986). It was taken there only in 1951 and 1961. Its closest relatives were the yellow shiner and the Ameca shiner.

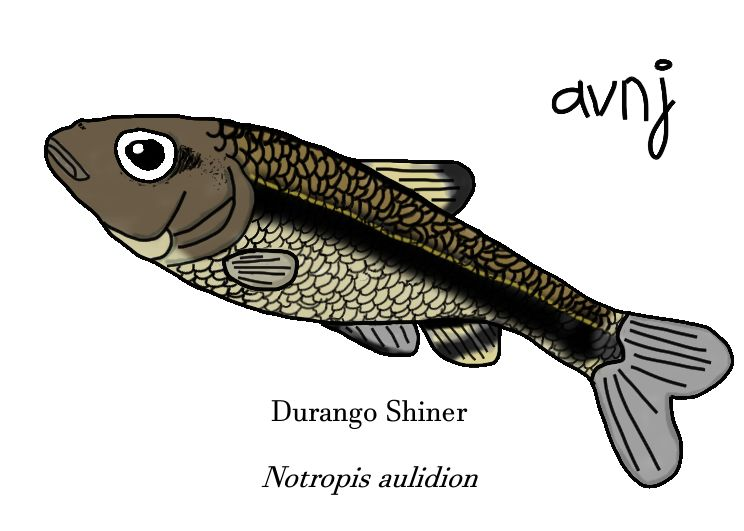

== Sources ==
- Durango shiner on FishBase
