= Ameca shiner =

Conservation status
- Extinct in the Wild (IUCN 3.1)

Scientific classification
- Kingdom: Animalia
- Phylum: Chordata
- Class: Actinopterygii
- Order: Cypriniformes
- Family: Leuciscidae
- Subfamily: Pogonichthyinae
- Genus: Notropis
- Species: N. amecae

Binomial name
- Notropis amecae Chernoff & R. R. Miller, 1986

Species of fish

The Ameca shiner (Notropis amecae) is a species of freshwater ray-finned fish belonging to the family Leuciscidae, the shiners, daces and minnows. The Ameca shiner was described in 1986 from upper parts of the Ameca River drainage in Jalisco, Mexico. Although already feared extinct by 1969, and listed as such by the IUCN when rated in 1996, a tiny population was rediscovered in 2001. Some were brought into captivity to form the basis of a breeding program. These have been used for a reintroduction project since 2015.

Its closest relatives are the yellow shiner and the Durango shiner.

== Sources ==
- Ameca shiner on FishBase
