= Cumbres de Monterrey National Park =

National park in Mexico

- Parque Nacional Cumbres de Monterrey
- IUCN category II (national park)
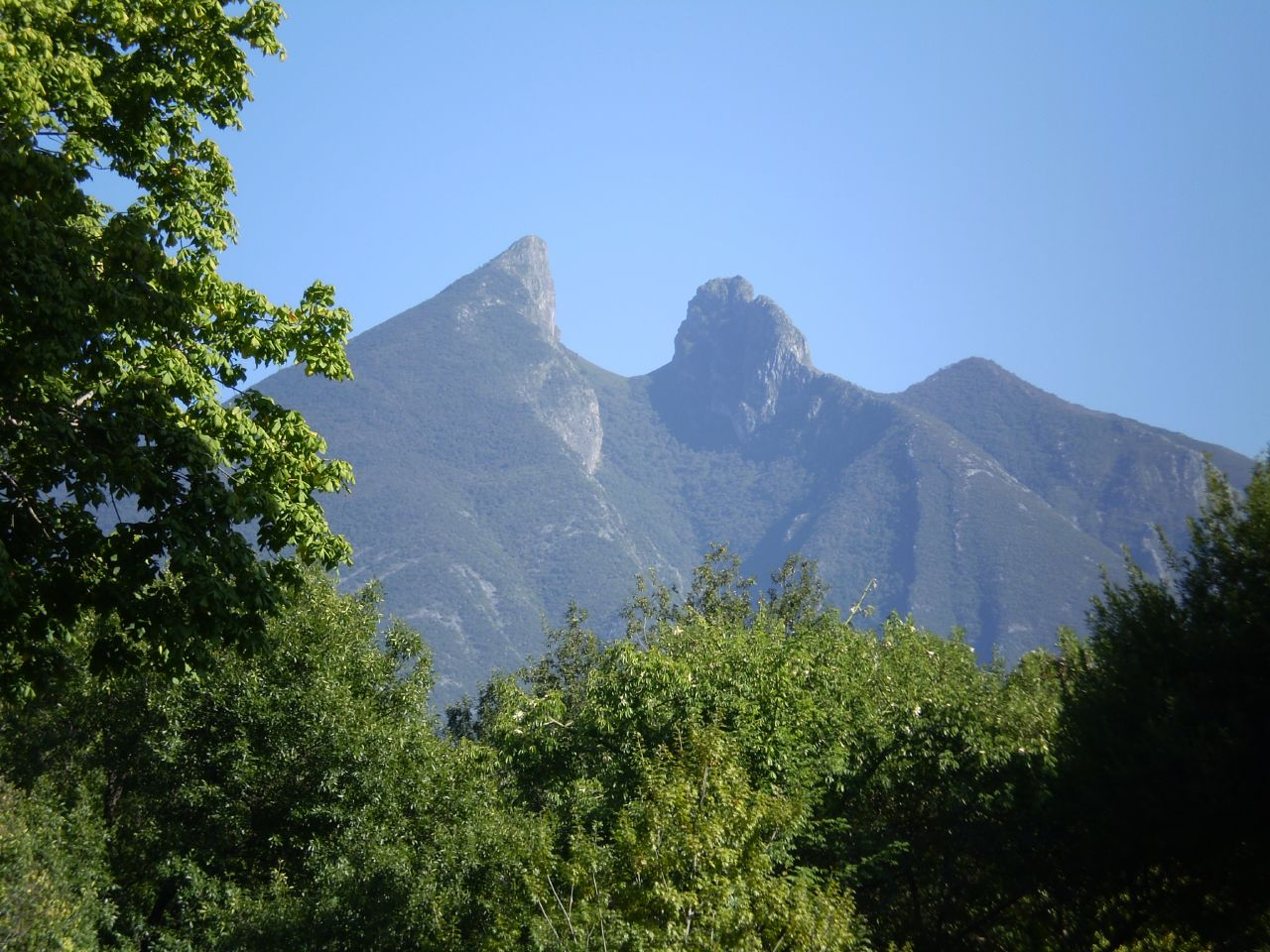
- El Cerro de la Silla is the most famous part of the national park

- Location within Mexico
- Location: Nuevo León and Coahuila, Mexico
- Nearest city: Monterrey, Nuevo León
- Coordinates: 25.44156°N 100.30489°W
- Area: 177,395.95 hectares (438,354.9 acres)
- Established: November 24, 1939
- Administrator: National Commission of Natural Protected Areas

The Cumbres de Monterrey (Spanish: Parque Nacional Cumbres de Monterrey, ['kumbɾes ðe monte'rej]; English: "Summits of Monterrey") is a national park of Mexico located in the northern portion of the Sierra Madre Oriental in the states of Nuevo León and Coahuila, near the city of Monterrey. The park protects more than 1,770 square kilometres (680 sq mi) of rugged terrain boasting deep canyons, rivers, waterfalls, and scenic mountain peaks, including the Cerro de la Silla ("Saddle Mountain"), part of Monterrey's famous skyline.

The park was created in 1939 under president Lázaro Cárdenas to protect the native flora and fauna against the spreading urbanization of the city of Monterrey. The cool pine-oak forests with winding trails through the mountains make this park a popular escape from the nearby metropolis.

== History ==
There are numerous indigenous paintings and stone carvings throughout the park that have proven humans have inhabited the area for thousands of years. Before the Spanish colonial period, different groups of Chichimeca inhabited the present area of Cumbres de Monterrey. Many of the different tribes in the region united for years in efforts to avoid Spanish rule. Monterrey became the first European settlement in the area when it was founded on September 20, 1596.

Cumbres de Monterrey National Park was established on November 24, 1939, by president Lázaro Cárdenas. The park was decreed to encompass 246,500 hectares (609,000 acres), which at the time was the largest area to be declared protected by the Mexican government as a national park. By decree on November 17, 2000, Cumbres de Monterrey National Park was reduced to an area of 177,395.95 hectares (438,354.9 acres).

== Geography ==
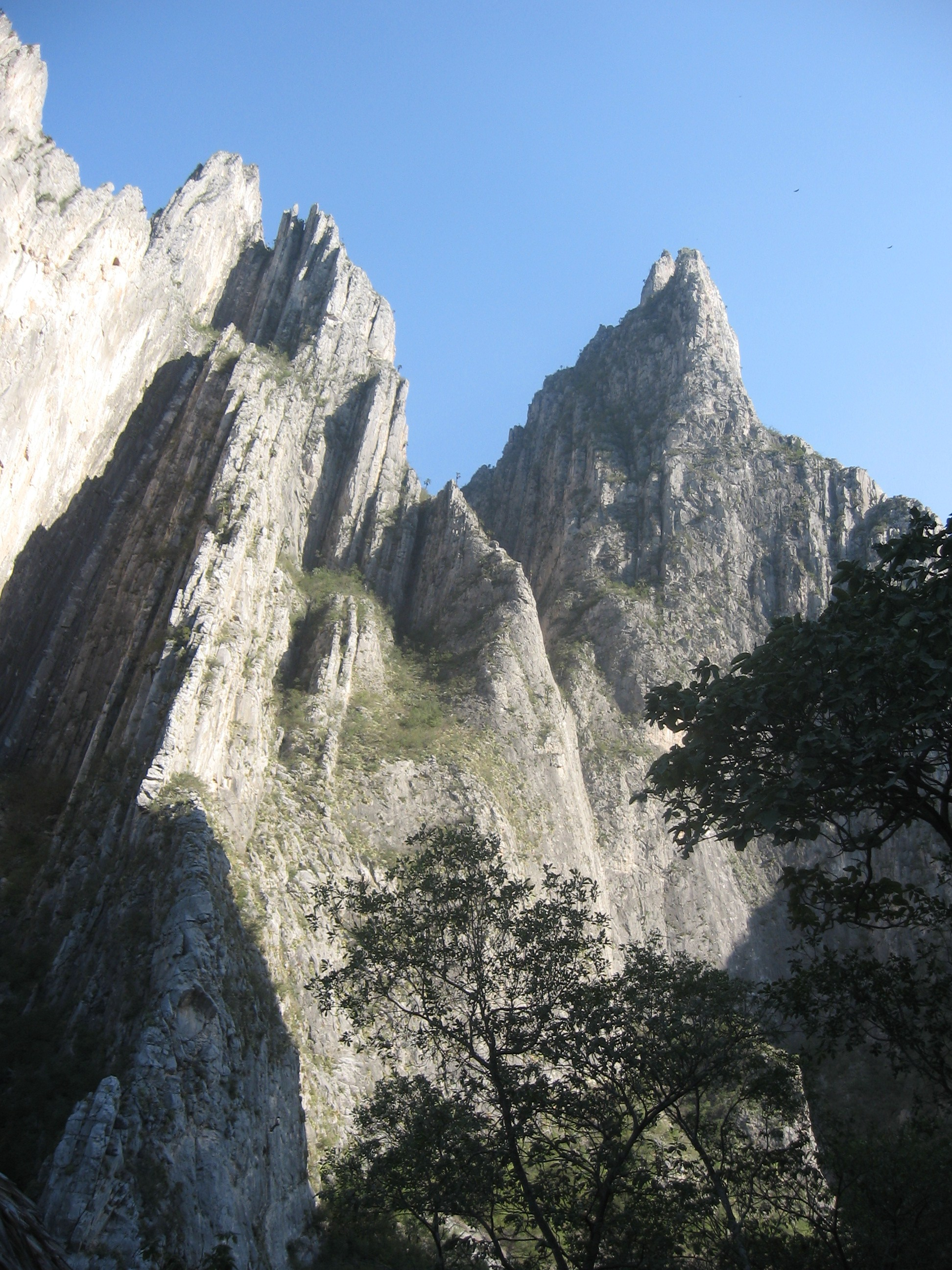
Karstification is a powerful force that has created caves and spectacular rock formations throughout the park

The most accessible portion of Cumbres de Monterrey is Chipinque on the edge of Monterrey, about 19 kilometres (12 mi) from downtown. At the visitor center, park officials provide information and maps of several hiking paths varying from easy to moderately difficult. Chipinque is an ecological reserve within the park that allow visitors easy access to much of the flora and fauna found in the park.

The park is located in the northern portion of the Sierra Madre Oriental, which was formed by rock folding of marine based sedimentary strata during the Eocene epoch in the Laramide orogeny period. The marine sedimentary rock rose over the years to an elevation of 2,260 m (7,410 ft) above sea level. The highest peaks in the park include:

- Pinar: 1,515 m (4,970 ft) above sea level
- Cerro de la Silla: 1,820 m (5,970 ft) above sea level
- La Ventana: 1,955 m (6,414 ft) above sea level
- La Antenna: 2,015 m (6,611 ft) above sea level
- M Este: 2,020 m (6,630 ft) above sea level
- Copete de las Águilas: 2,260 m (7,410 ft) above sea level

The main sedimentary rock that constitutes the mountains in the park was formed during the Cretaceous period. Most of the sedimentary rock features extensive karstification that happened over millions of years, creating several underground systems such as subterranean rivers, caves, and aquifers. Grutas de García (García Caves) is one of the largest cave systems in Mexico and one of the most popular attractions within the park. García Caves were hidden for millions of years until being discovered in 1843. Marine fossils have been discovered inside these caves because the lining of the caves mainly consists of oceanic sedimentary rock. The porous sedimentary rock in the park allows water to filter into subterranean rivers that replenish underground aquifers, which provide one of the primary sources of water for the city of Monterrey. Pozo del Gavilán (Eagle's Hole), the only cenote known in northern Mexico is located in the southern tip of the park; it is another prime example of karstification. Pozo del Gavilán is a popular site to rappel and is subterraneously connected to Laguna de Labradores (Labradores Lake).

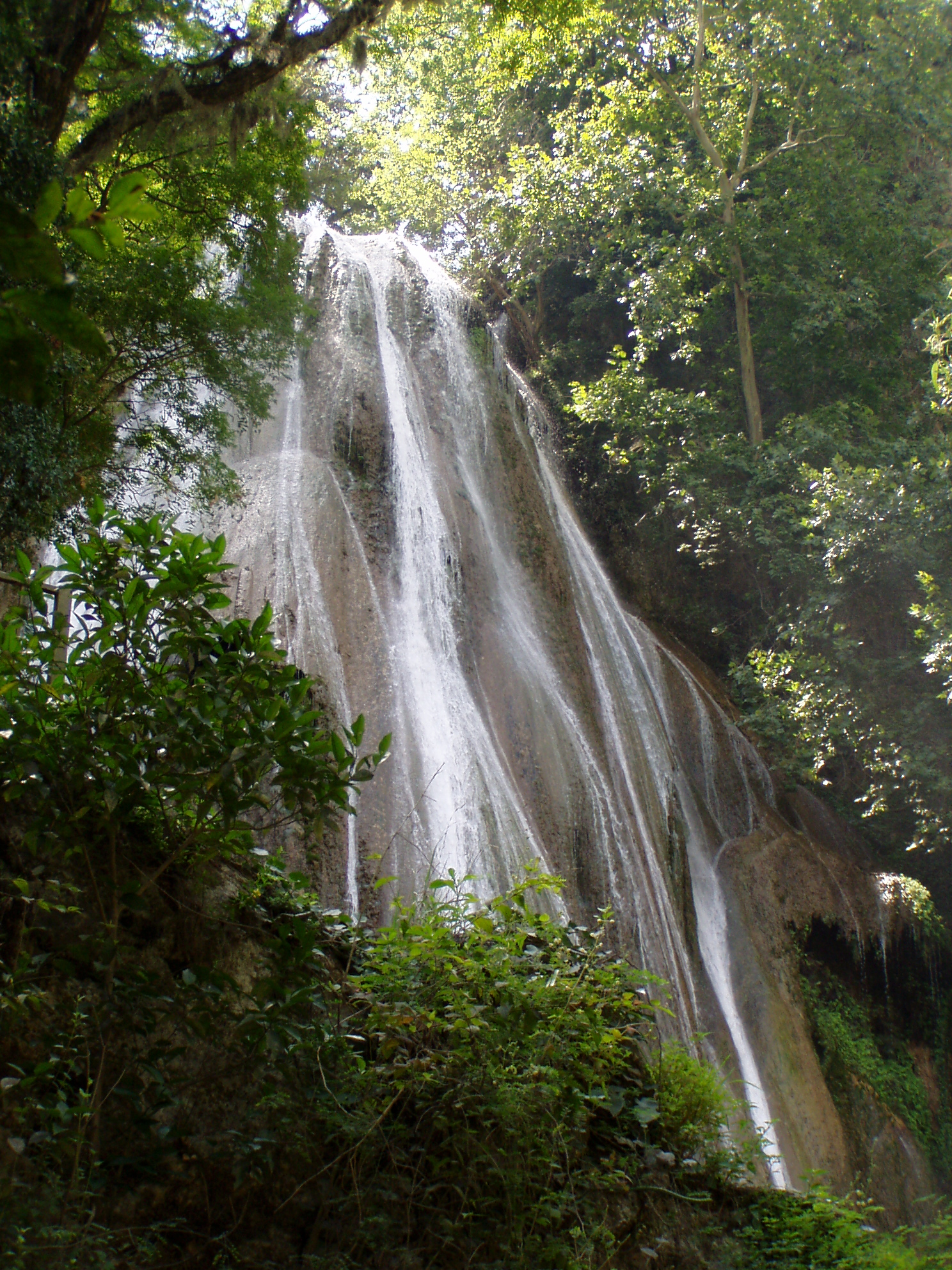
Cascada Cola de Caballo

Cañón de la Huasteca, the most famous of the many canyons found in Cumbres de Monterrey, accounts for about 200 hectares (490 acres) of the park. The walls of Cañón de la Huasteca are marked with a significant number of prehistoric glyphs created thousands of years ago by the ancient inhabitants of the region. Another popular canyon is Matacanes Canyon where there are several waterfalls, of which Cascada de Chipitín (Chipitín Falls) is the most famous.

Throughout the park there are numerous waterfalls, and there may be more to be found because there is an extensive cave system with large amounts of water not drained by surface streams and rivers but rather by subterranean ones. The two most famous waterfalls are Cascada Cola de Caballo (Horsetail Falls) and Cascada de Chipitín. Easily accessible by a trail, Horsetail Falls is one of the highlights of the park with a spectacular 25 m (82 ft) drop; the water pours over large rounded boulders in a way that resembles a horse's tail. Chipitín Falls is not easily accessible and requires a difficult hike, some rappelling, and swimming; the waterfall has an impressive 27 m (89 ft) drop. In addition to the many surface streams and rivers there are many ponds and small lakes. The best known lake is Laguna de Labradores.

Cuenca Alimentadora del Distrito Nacional de Riego 026 Bajo Río San Juan (CADNR 026 Bajo Río San Juan), a natural resources protection area, adjoins the national park on the south and west.

== Climate ==
The climate throughout the park changes drastically depending on the elevation and the location of the terrain. According to the Köppen climate classification there are several climates within the park. The following climates are listed by elevation in the park.

Elevation 600–1,000 m (2,000–3,300 ft): North tip of the park has a (BWh) desert climate with an average annual temperature of 23 °C (73 °F) and an annual precipitation of 21.7 cm (8.5 in). The southeast corner and central east portion of the park has a (Awh) Tropical Savanna climate with mild winters, summer-autumn monsoon, annual precipitation of 106.4 cm (41.9 in), and an average annual temperature of 21 °C (70 °F).

Elevation 1,000–2,000 m (3,300–6,600 ft): North tip and the southwest corner of the park has a (BSk) Steppe Climate with an average annual temperature 21 °C (70 °F). Central portion of the park has a (Cwa) Humid Subtropical climate with an average annual temperature of 21 °C (70 °F) and an annual precipitation of 62 cm (24 in).

Elevation 2,000–3,000 m (6,600–9,800 ft): Western side of the park has a (Cwb) Oceanic climate with an average annual temperature of 14 °C (57 °F) and an annual precipitation of 68 cm (27 in).

== Flora and fauna ==
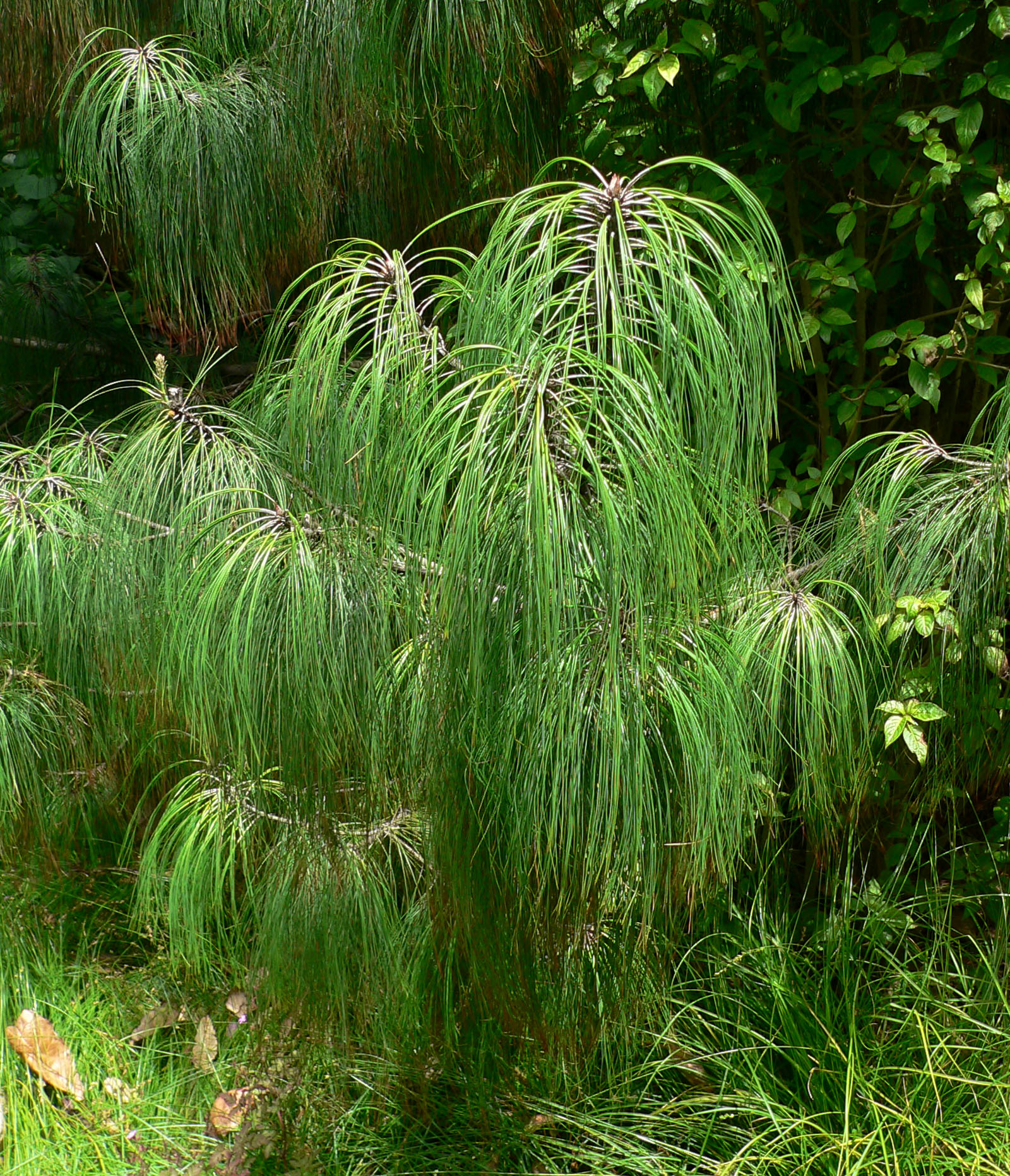
Smooth-bark Mexican pine (Pinus pseudostrobus)

The Cumbres de Monterrey National Park is home to a great variety of ecosystems due to the geography of the park where there are many microclimates allowing a greater variety of flora and fauna to flourish. Agave, Dasylirion, and Rhus species are found in many areas of the park. The forest is made up mainly of the following tree species:

- Spruce: Picea martinezii, Picea engelmannii
- Yucca: Yucca carnerosana, Yucca filifera
- Douglas fir: Pseudotsuga lindleyana, Pseudotsuga flahualti
- Fir: Abies vejarii, Abies hickelii, Abies hidalgensis, Abies durangensis
- Oak: Quercus fusiformis, Quercus greggii, Quercus hipoxlanta, Quercus laeta, Quercus saltillensis
- Pine: Pinus ayacahuite, Pinus cembroides, Pinus greggii, Pinus hartwegii, Pinus pinceana, Pinus pseudostrobus, Pinus rudis, Pinus teocote

The pine and oak forests and steppe are home to many animals. The park has one of the most diverse ecosystems in the northern part of Mexico. There is a large variety of fish that can be found in the park, but most species are endangered. Among the fish species present in the park are Astyanax mexicanus, Campostoma anomalum, Cichlasoma cyanoguttatum, Cyprinella lutrensis, Etheostoma grahami, Gambusia affinis, Macrhybopsis aestivalis, Notropis amabilis, Notropis braytoni, Notropis stramineus, Poecilia mexicana, Puntius conchonius, and Xiphophorus couchianus. Even though there are many species of fish, the following are the only known endemic species: Cyprinella rutila, Dionda melanops and Moxostoma albidum. A significant number of Cyprinodon species still exists but many are endangered or have gone extinct.

The park hosts a large variety of bird species, including Accipiter striatus, Aquila chrysaetos, Circus cyaneus, Falco columbarius, Falco mexicanus, Falco peregrinus, Rhynchopsitta terrisi, Speotyto cunicularia, and Spizella wortheni. The park's mammals include Puma concolor, Ursus americanus, Canis latrans, and Odocoileus virginianus.

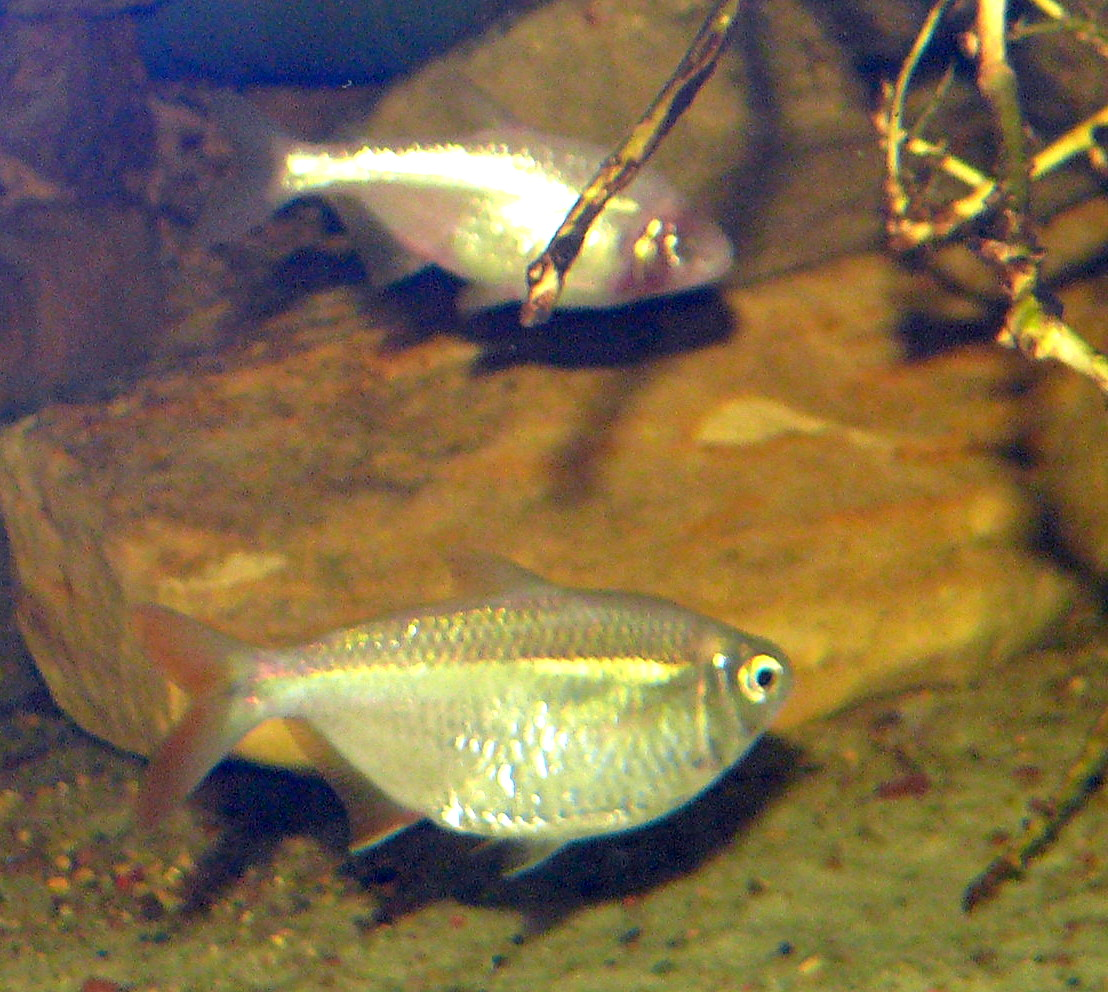
Mexican Tetra (Astyanax mexicanus)

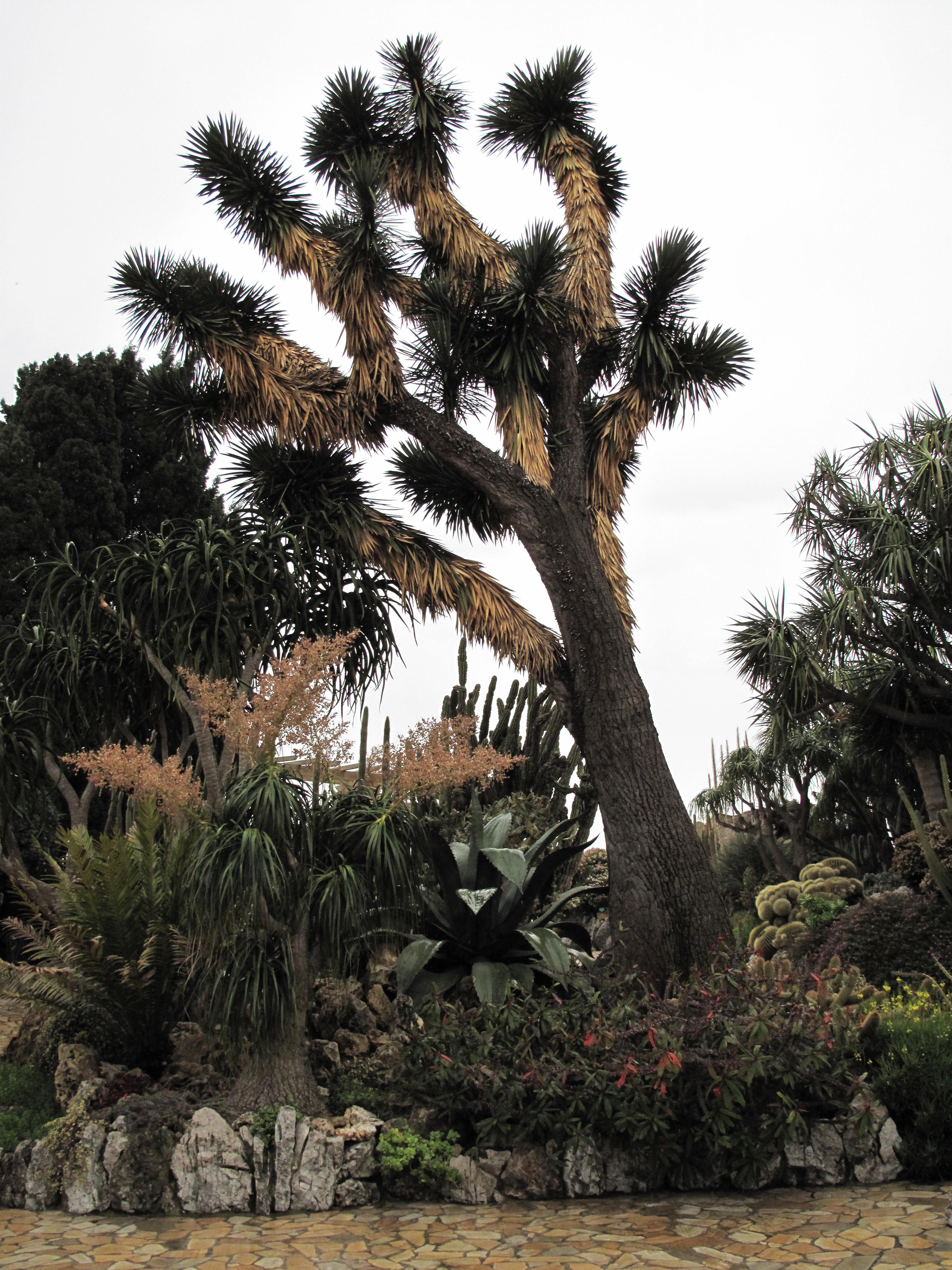
Yucca filifera

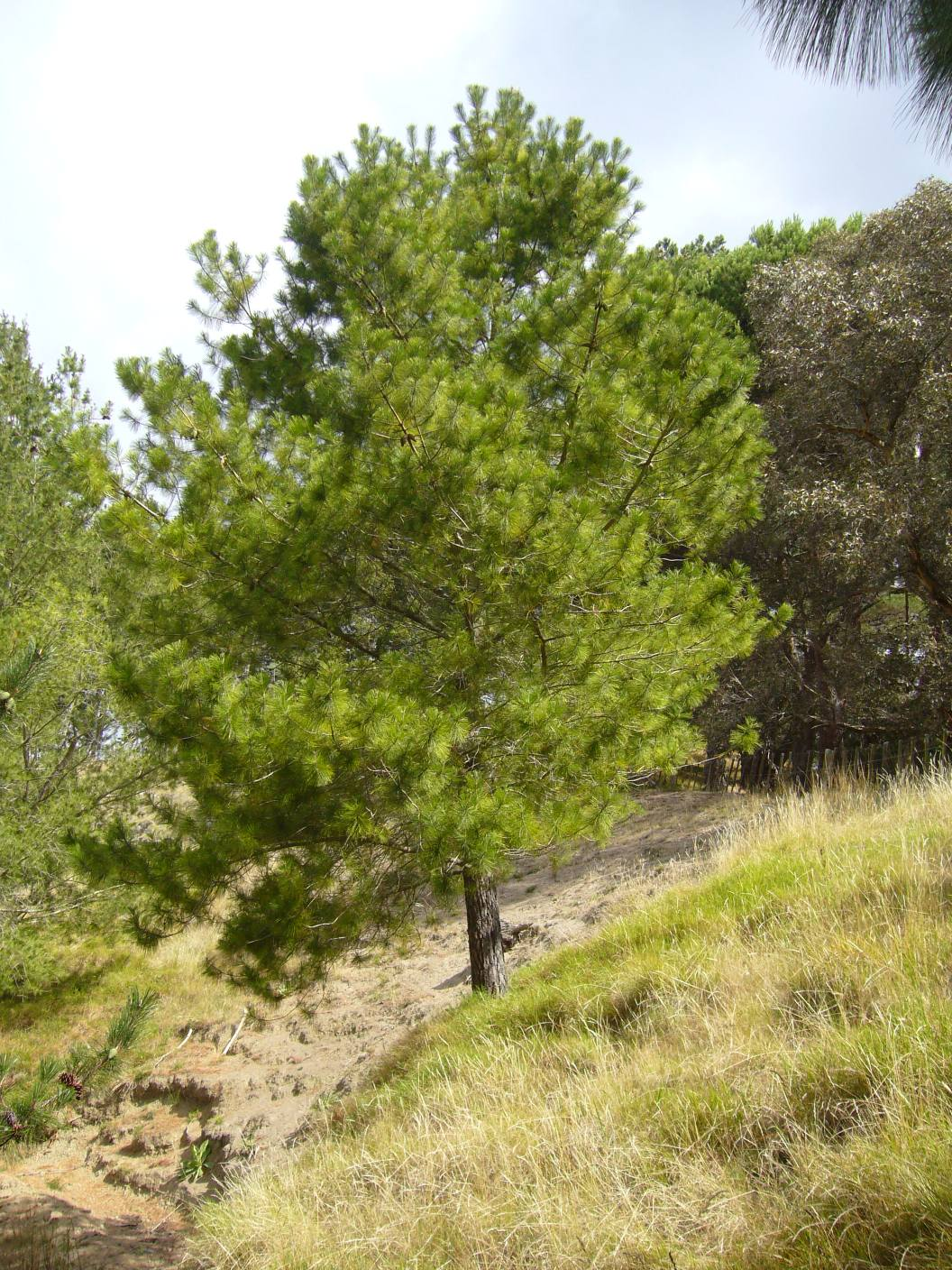
Pinus greggii

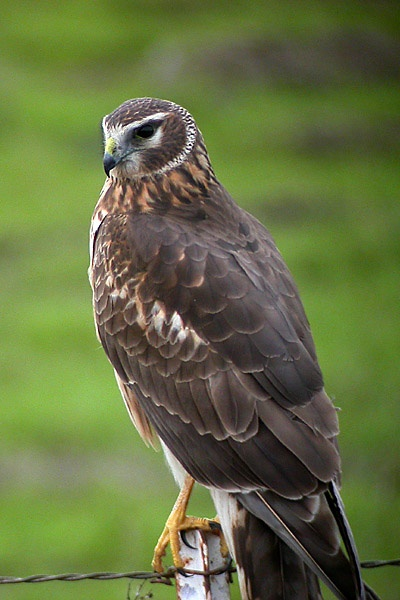
Northern Harrier (Circus cyaneus)
