= El Triunfo Biosphere Reserve =

Nature reserve in Mexico

- IUCN category VI (protected area with sustainable use of natural resources)
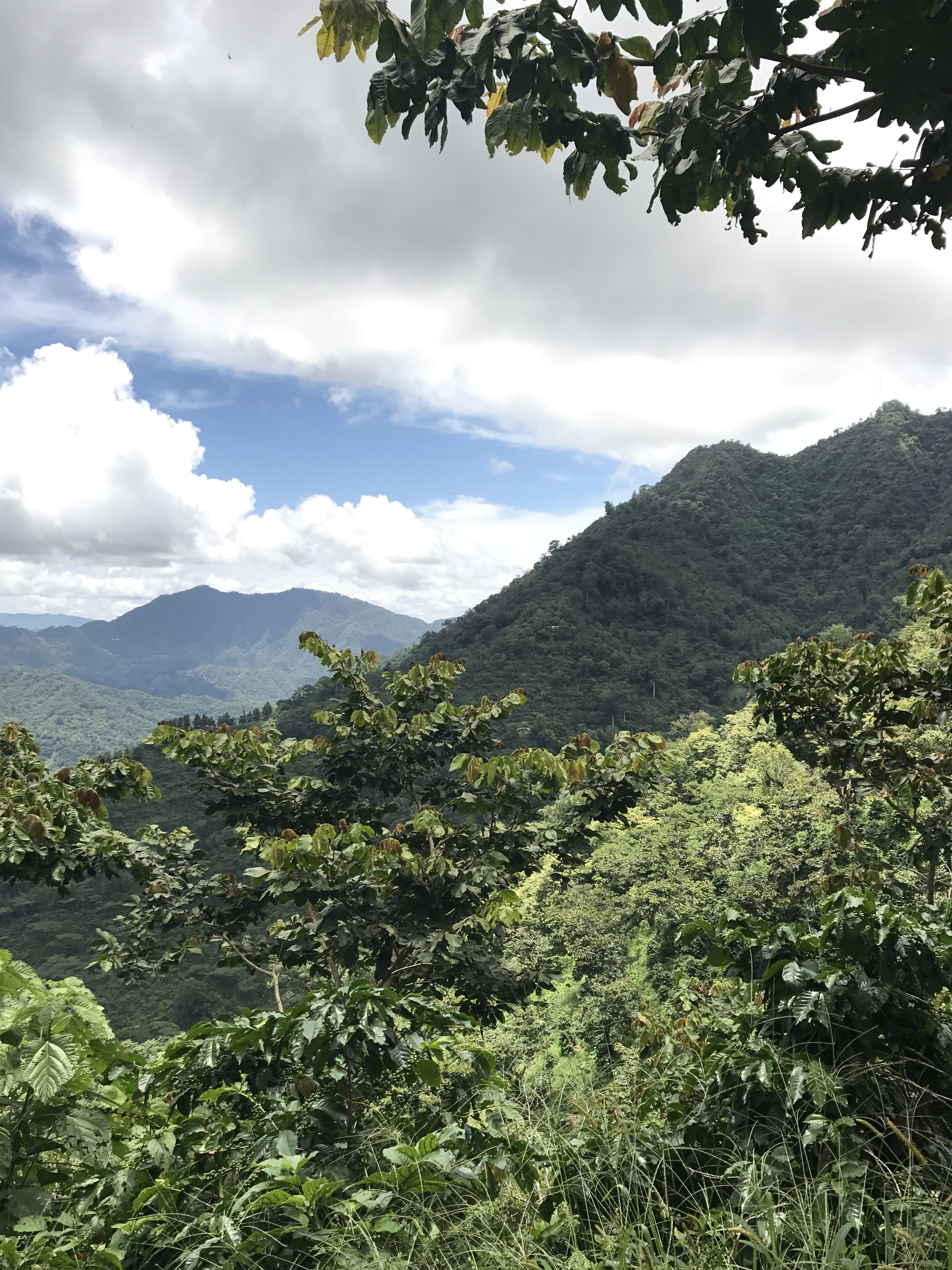
- El Triunfo

- Location within Mexico
- Location: Chiapas, Mexico
- Coordinates: 15°38′27″N 92°43′39″W
- Area: 1,191.77 km^{2} (460.14 sq mi)
- Designation: biosphere reserve
- Designated: 1990 (national) 1993 (international)
- Governing body: National Commission of Natural Protected Areas

El Triunfo Biosphere Reserve is a biosphere reserve in southern Mexico. It is in the Sierra Madre de Chiapas in southern Chiapas.

== Geography ==
El Triunfo Biosphere Reserve has an area of 1191.77 km^{2} in the Sierra Madre de Chiapas, a mountain range that extends roughly east–west parallel to the Pacific coast of Mexico and Guatemala.

To the west El Triunfo borders the Zona de Protección Forestal en los terrenos que se encuentran en los municipios de La Concordia, Angel Albino Corzo, Villa Flores y Jiquipilas a natural resources protection area that protects the northern slope of the Sierra. El Triunfo, the Zona de Protección Forestal, and La Sepultura Biosphere Reserve further to the west form a continuous protected corridor along the western Sierra.

== Flora and fauna ==
El Triunfo is home to a range of plant communities, including tropical dry forest, foothill and montane evergreen moist forest, and pine–oak forest. 977 species of plants have been recorded in the reserve.

El Triunfo is notable for its cloud forests, which occur in mountain areas with high year-round rainfall. El Triunfo includes some of the largest remaining cloud forests in Mexico. El Triunfo's cloud forests are biodiverse, with many plant and animal species and outstanding diversity of tree species. The cloud forests' vegetation and soils absorb the mountains' high rainfall, releasing it slowly into the rivers that drain from the mountains to the Pacific coastal plain to the south and the Chiapas Depression to the north, or releasing it back into the atmosphere through evapotranspiration to fall again as rain.

The reserve is home to 548 species of terrestrial vertebrates, 45% of the total number of species recorded for Chiapas and 22% of the total for Mexico. 112 of those are mammals, representing 56% of the mammal species in Chiapas and 23% of those in Mexico. 63 reptile species are native to the reserve, including 32% of the known species in Chiapas and 9% of the total for Mexico. The reserve has 22 species of amphibians, 23% of the total recorded in Chiapas and 7.5% of those for the Mexico as a whole.

588 species of daytime Lepidoptera (butterflies and moths) have been recorded in the reserve, 49% of the total identified in Chiapas.

== People ==
Residents of the reserve's buffer zone mostly make a living by growing corn, beans, and other crops for community use and coffee as a cash crop.

== History ==
In 1972 this area was declared a state park, in 1990 the Mexican government designated El Triunfo as a biosphere reserve, with an area of 934.58 km^{2}. In 1993 UNESCO declared El Triunfo an international biosphere reserve, with an area of 1191.77 km^{2}.
