= Cuenca Alimentadora del Distrito Nacional de Riego 026 Bajo Río San Juan =

- CADNR 043 026 Bajo Río San Juan
- IUCN category VI (protected area with sustainable use of natural resources)
- Location within Mexico
- Location: Coahuila and Nuevo León Mexico
- Coordinates: 25°23′16.3″N 100°28′25.5″W
- Area: 2,329,027 ha (8,992.42 sq mi)
- Designation: Natural resources protection area
- Designated: 2002
- Administrator: National Commission of Natural Protected Areas (CONANP)

The Cuenca Alimentadora del Distrito Nacional de Riego 026 Bajo Río San Juan is a protected area in northeastern Mexico. It extends over part of the northern Sierra Madre Occidental, near the cities of Monterrey and Saltillo.

== Geography ==
The protected area covers an area of 1971.57 km^{2}, which includes much of the northern Sierra Madre Oriental. It adjoins Cumbres de Monterrey National Park to the north, Serranía de Zapalinamé ecological reserve to the west, and Cerro el Potosí ecological reserve on the southeast.

The protected area protects the headwaters of the San Juan River, which supplies water to the Monterrey Metropolitan Area, Mexico's second most populous, and the agricultural lower Rio Grande valley.

== Flora and fauna ==
The natural vegetation is pine–oak forest at higher elevations. pines and/or oaks are the dominant trees, forming dense forests or open woodlands. There are also groves of oyamel fir (Abies vejarii) and Mexican Douglas-fir or ayarín (Pseudotsuga menziesii var. lindleyana).

Lower elevations are warmer and dryer, and home to chaparral, submontane matorral, desert matorral (microphyll and rosetophyll), secondary scrubland, and agriculture.

== Conservation ==
The area was designated a protected forest area and watershed in 1949. It was redesignated a natural resources protection area in 2002.
