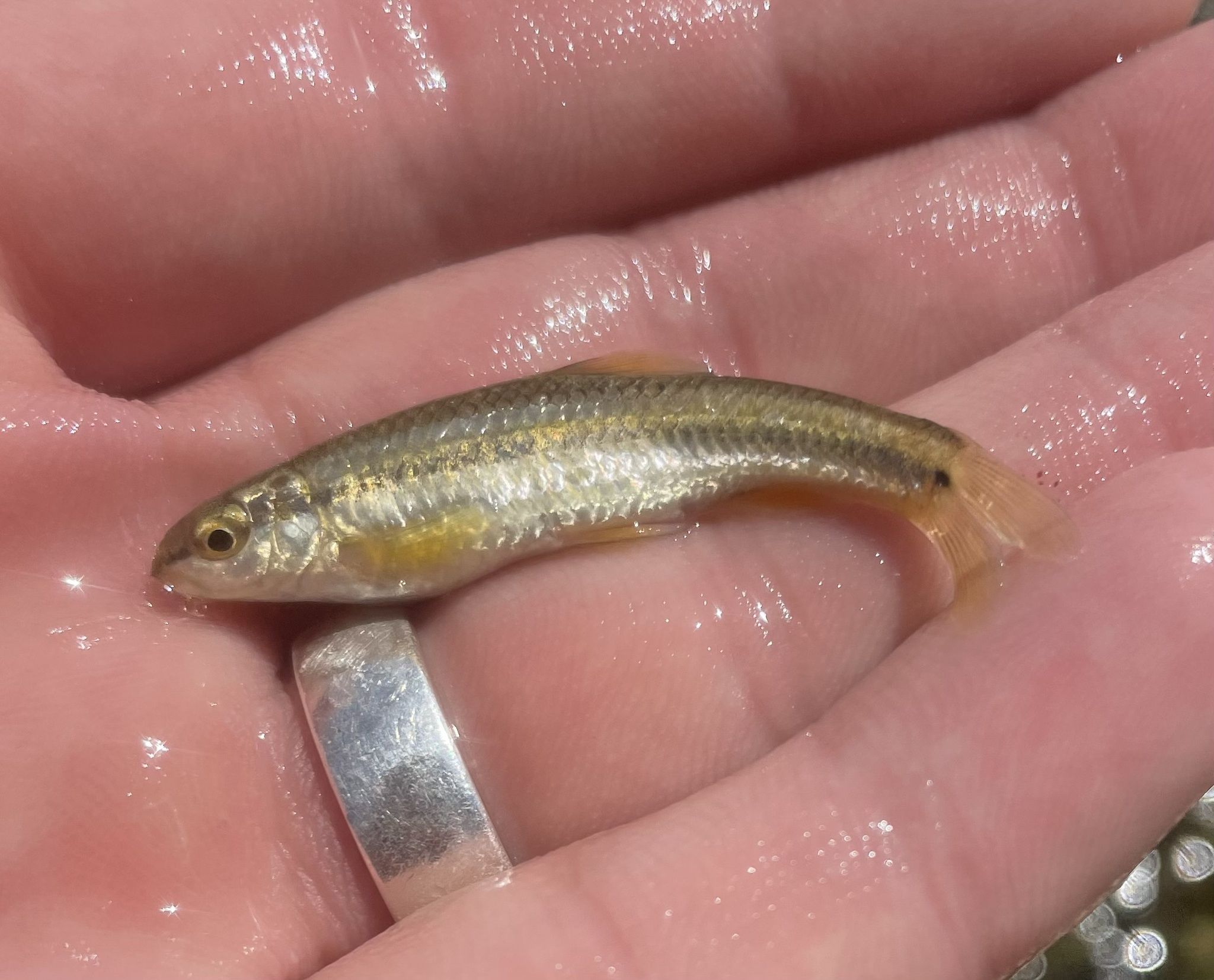

Conservation status
- Least Concern (IUCN 3.1)

Scientific classification
- Kingdom: Animalia
- Phylum: Chordata
- Class: Actinopterygii
- Order: Cypriniformes
- Family: Leuciscidae
- Subfamily: Pogonichthyinae
- Genus: Dionda
- Species: D. serena

Binomial name
- Dionda serena Girard, 1856

= Nueces roundnose minnow =

Species of fish

The Nueces roundnose minnow (Dionda serena) is a species of freshwater ray-finned fish in the family Leuciscidae, the shiners, daces and minnows. It is endemic to the upper Nueces in Texas.

== Taxonomy ==
The Nueces roundnose minnow was first described by Charles Girard in his 1856 publication Researches upon the cyprinoid species inhabiting the fresh waters of the United States west of the Mississippi valley. The etymology of the species name "serena" meaning fair, as in coloration, is thought to refer to a lighter complexion compared with the closely related and easily mistaken Roundnose minnow (Dionda episcopa).

Molecular DNA surveys have verified the species classification of the Nueces roundnose minnow from similar Dionda species, as well as delimiting its native range.

== Description ==
Girard's original description of the refers to the fish as having a slender body. The coloration of the minnow is light brown dorsal region with silver flanks and belly, separated by black scales along the lateral line extending through the eye to the nose. The fish also has a black spot at the base of the caudal fin. The maximum size of the fish is 3 inches. Other features of the minnow include its subterminal mouth, 34-40 lateral line scales and 7 anal fin soft rays.

== Diet ==
A gut content analysis conducted by Katerina Cohen analyzed the stomach contents of three individual Nueces roundnose minnows. Her analysis determined that the bulk of the diet of the individuals examined was amorphous detritus (53.7% ±27.4) followed by picoplankton (21.3% ± 12.6) and diatoms (18.7% ± 8.9), particularly Cymbelloids (14.5% ± 7.6).

== Habitat ==
The minnow is endemic to the Nueces River drainage unit and in particular is restricted to spring-fed areas with minimal seasonal temperature variation. Furthermore, they favor rocky pools and areas with filamentous algae growth.

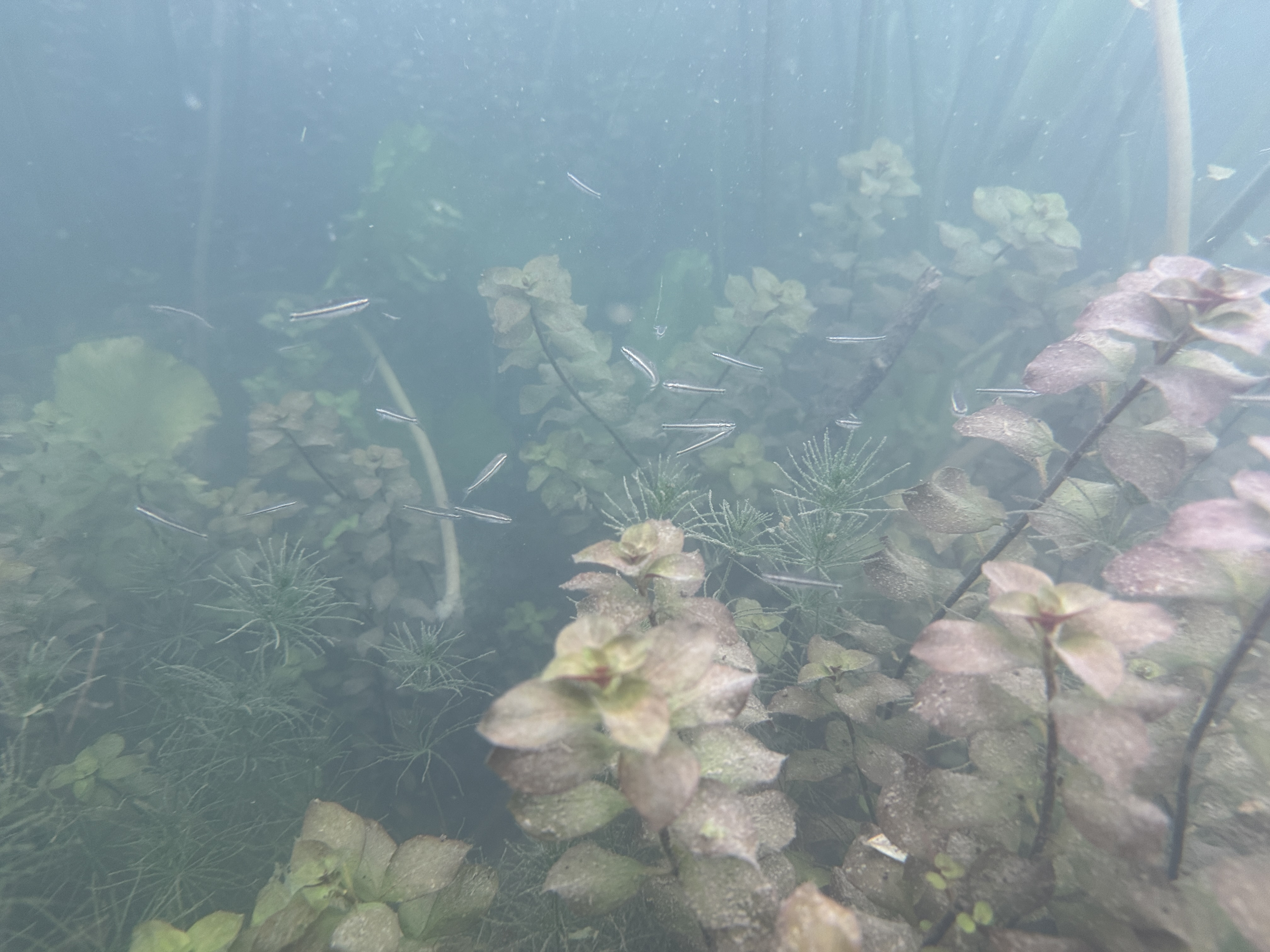
The photo shows a shoal Nueces roundnose minnows in their habitat within the Frio River.

== Conservation ==
Listed as "Least concern" by the IUCN, the conservation status of D. serena is somewhat disputed. It is classified by the state of Texas as S2 imperiled.
