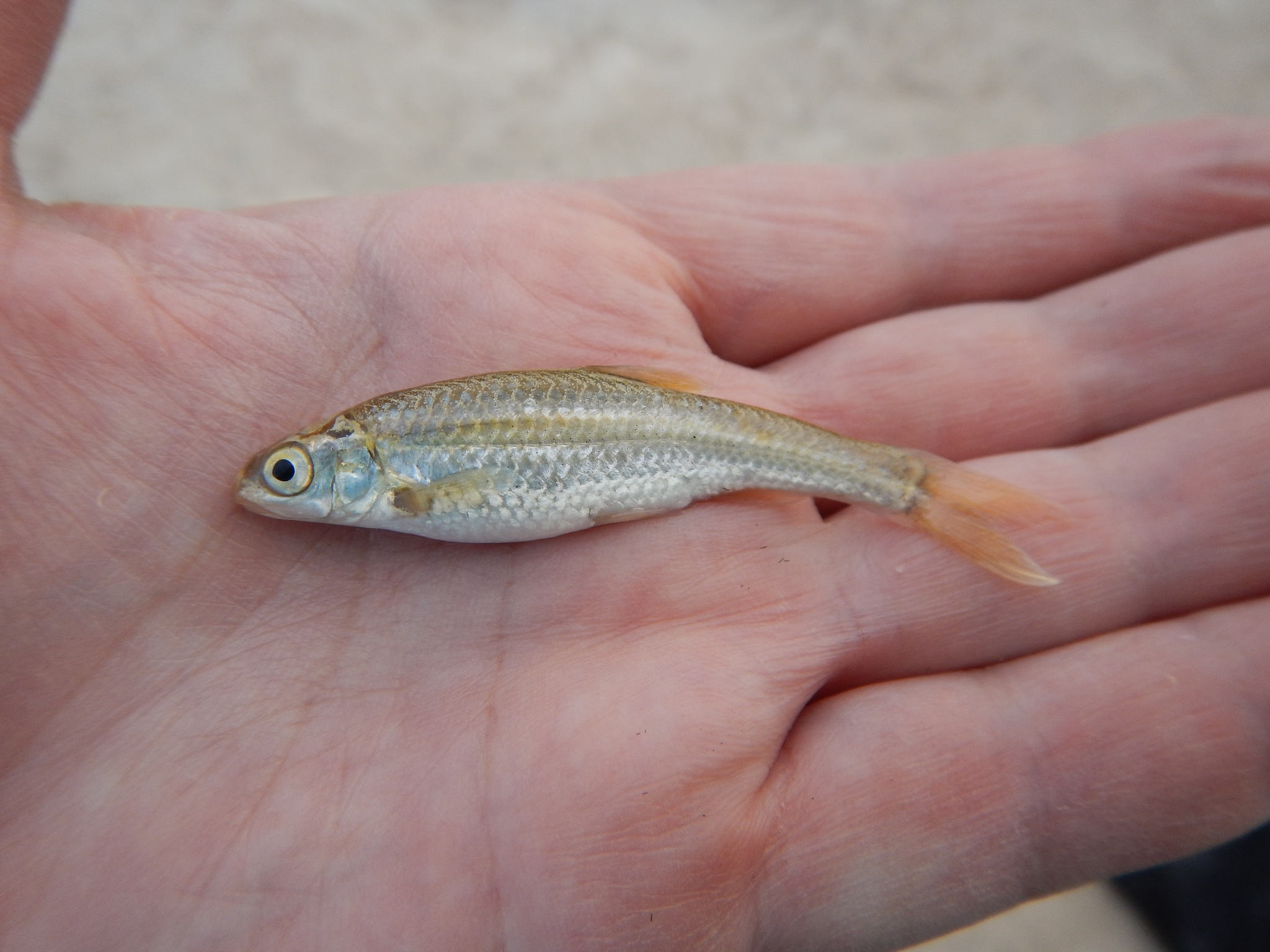

Conservation status
- Endangered (IUCN 3.1)

Scientific classification
- Kingdom: Animalia
- Phylum: Chordata
- Class: Actinopterygii
- Order: Cypriniformes
- Family: Leuciscidae
- Subfamily: Pogonichthyinae
- Genus: Dionda
- Species: D. argentosa

Binomial name
- Dionda argentosa Girard, 1856

= Manantial roundnose minnow =

Species of fish

The Manantial roundnose minnow (Dionda argentosa) is a species of freshwater ray-finned fish in the family Leuciscidae, the shiners, daces and minnows. This species is endemic to the Devils River and San Felipe Creek in Texas, United States.

It is threatened by habitat loss.
