= Cuenca Alimentadora del Distrito Nacional de Riego 01 Pabellón =

Protected area in central Mexico

- CADNR 01 Pabellón
- IUCN category VI (protected area with sustainable use of natural resources)
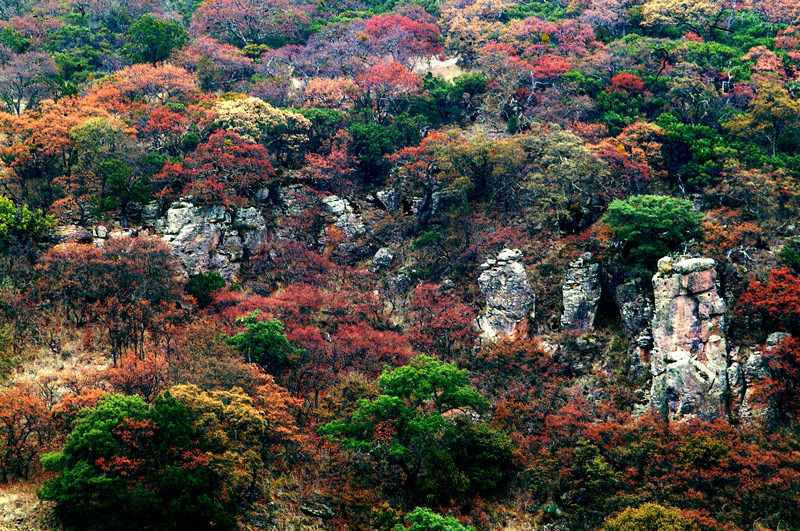
- the Sierra Fría

- Location within Mexico
- Location: Aguascalientes and Zacatecas, Mexico
- Coordinates: 22°15′49.3″N 102°33′13.0″W
- Area: 97,700 ha (377 sq mi)
- Designation: Natural resources protection area
- Designated: 2002
- Administrator: National Commission of Natural Protected Areas

The Cuenca Alimentadora del Distrito Nacional de Riego 01 Pabellón is a protected area of central Mexico. It covers a portion of the Sierra Fría in Aguascalientes and Zacatecas states.

== Geography ==
The protected area consists of two separate blocks of land totaling 977 km^{2} in the Sierra Fría, which is the south-easternmost range of the Sierra Madre Occidental where it meets the Mexican Plateau. The protected area includes the eastern portion of the Sierra Fría lying in the basin of the Río Verde. It adjoins the Cuenca Alimentadora del Distrito Nacional de Riego 043 Estado de Nayarit on the west, which covers the portion of the Sierra Fría drained by the Juchipila River. Both the Verde and Juchipila are southward-flowing tributaries of the Río Grande de Santiago.

The protected area covers portions of the municipalities of Calvillo, Jesús María, Pabellón de Arteaga, Rincón de Romos, San José de Gracia, Cuauhtémoc, Genaro Codina, Guadalupe, Ojocaliente, and Villanueva.

== Flora and fauna ==
The natural vegetation at higher elevations is pine–oak forest and woodland, with pines and/or oaks as the dominant trees, together with manzanillo (Arbutus spp.), juniper, and other plants. The forests vary with rainfall, altitude, and soils, and are home to numerous plant and animal species, including some endemic and limited-range species. Areas that have been logged are covered in thickets of manzanillo, and montane grasslands occur on canyon slopes. Matorral (dry shrubland) is found at lower elevations.

Wildlife includes white-tailed deer (Odocoileus virginianus), puma (Puma concolor), collared peccary (Dicotyles tajacu), ringtail (Bassariscus astutus), gray fox (Urocyon cinereoargenteus), golden eagle (Aquila chrysaetos), peregrine falcon (Falco peregrinus), Montezuma quail (Cyrtonyx montezumae), and the snakes Crotalus polystictus and Crotalus triseriatus.

== Conservation ==
The area was designated a protected forest area and watershed in August 1949. It was redesignated a Natural resources protection area in 2002. Camping, hiking, nature walks, horseback riding, and mountain biking are permitted, and hunting and sport fishing are permitted with prior permission.
