= Zona de Protección Forestal en los terrenos que se encuentran en los municipios de La Concordia, Angel Albino Corzo, Villa Flores y Jiquipilas =

Protected area in southern Mexico

- IUCN category VI (protected area with sustainable use of natural resources)
- Location within Mexico
- Location: Chiapas, Mexico
- Coordinates: 15°55′20″N 93°09′19″W
- Area: 1,775.46 km^{2} (685.51 sq mi)
- Designation: Natural resources protection area
- Designated: 2009
- Administrator: National Commission of Natural Protected Areas

The Zona de Protección Forestal en los terrenos que se encuentran en los municipios de La Concordia, Angel Albino Corzo, Villa Flores y Jiquipilas is a natural resources protection area in southern Mexico. It was established in 2009.

It has an area of 1775.46 km^{2}, and covers a portion of the Sierra Madre de Chiapas in southern Chiapas. The area protects the northern slopes of the range, in the watershed of the Grijalva River and its tributaries. It adjoins La Sepultura Biosphere Reserve to the west and El Triunfo Biosphere Reserve to the west, creating a protected corridor which covers much of the Mexican portion of the sierra.
