= Zona Protectora Forestal los terrenos constitutivos de las cuencas de los ríos Valle de Bravo, Malacatepec, Tilostoc y Temascaltepec =

- IUCN category VI (protected area with sustainable use of natural resources)
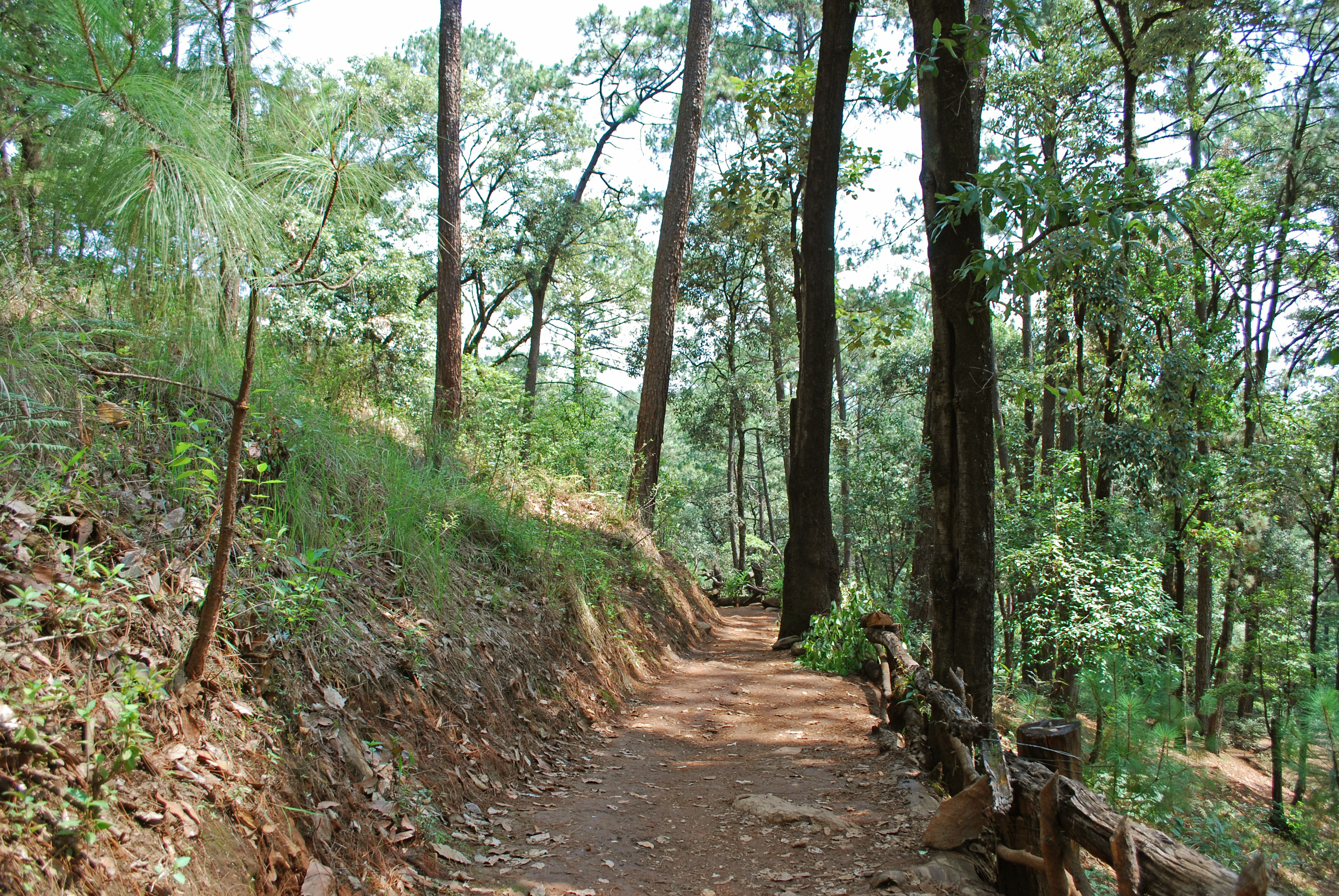
- Pine–oak forest near Valle de Bravo

- Location within Mexico
- Location: State of Mexico, Mexico
- Coordinates: 19°12′N 100°04′W
- Area: 1,402.34 km^{2} (541.45 sq mi)
- Designation: Natural resources protection area
- Designated: 2005
- Administrator: National Commission of Natural Protected Areas

Zona Protectora Forestal los terrenos constitutivos de las cuencas de los ríos Valle de Bravo, Malacatepec, Tilostoc y Temascaltepec is a protected area in central Mexico. It covers an area 1402.34 km^{2} in the mountains of the State of Mexico. It protects the headwaters of the Cutzamala and Temascaltepec rivers. The Cutzamala basin provides freshwater to Mexico City via the Cutzamala-Lerma System.

== Geography ==
The Zona Protectora Forestal los terrenos constitutivos de las cuencas de los ríos Valle de Bravo, Malacatepec, Tilostoc y Temascaltepec extends across a portion of the Trans-Mexican Volcanic Belt. These mountains form the divide between the Lerma River basin to the north and the Balsas River basin to the south. The Cutzamala and Temascaltepec rivers are tributaries of the Balsas.

The Zona Protectora adjoins Nevado de Toluca National Park to the east, Santuario del Agua y Forestal Presa Villa Victoria State Park and Bosencheve National Park to the north, and Monarch Butterfly Biosphere Reserve to the northwest.

== Flora and fauna ==
Plant communities vary with elevation, rainfall, and soils. Tropical dry deciduous and semi-deciduous forests occur at lower elevations. Oak forests and pine–oak forests are found at middle elevations, with pine and fir forests at the highest elevations.

Characteristic plants include species of oak (Quercus) and pine (Pinus), oyamel fir (Abies religiosa), American hornbeam (Carpinus caroliniana), Populus simaroa, madroño (Arbutus xalapensis), flame coral tree (Erythrina coralloides), and the orchids Rhynchostele cervantesii, Hagsatera brachycolumna, Oncidium unguiculatum, and Rossioglossum insleayi.

Native animals include the margay (Leopardus wiedii), jaguarundi (Herpailurus yagouaroundi), neotropical otter (Lontra longicaudis), southern flying squirrel (Glaucomys volans), Cooper's hawk (Astur cooperii), sharp-shinned hawk (Accipiter striatus), peregrine falcon (Falco peregrinus), Montezuma quail (Cyrtonyx montezumae), long-tailed wood partridge (Dendrortyx macroura), brown-backed solitaire (Myadestes occidentalis), and Strickland's woodpecker (Leuconotopicus stricklandi). The region's mountains are the winter home of the monarch butterfly (Danaus plexippus).

== Conservation ==
President Manuel Ávila Camacho designated the area as a protected watershed by decree on 15 November 1941. It was redesignated a natural resources protection area on 23 June 2005.
