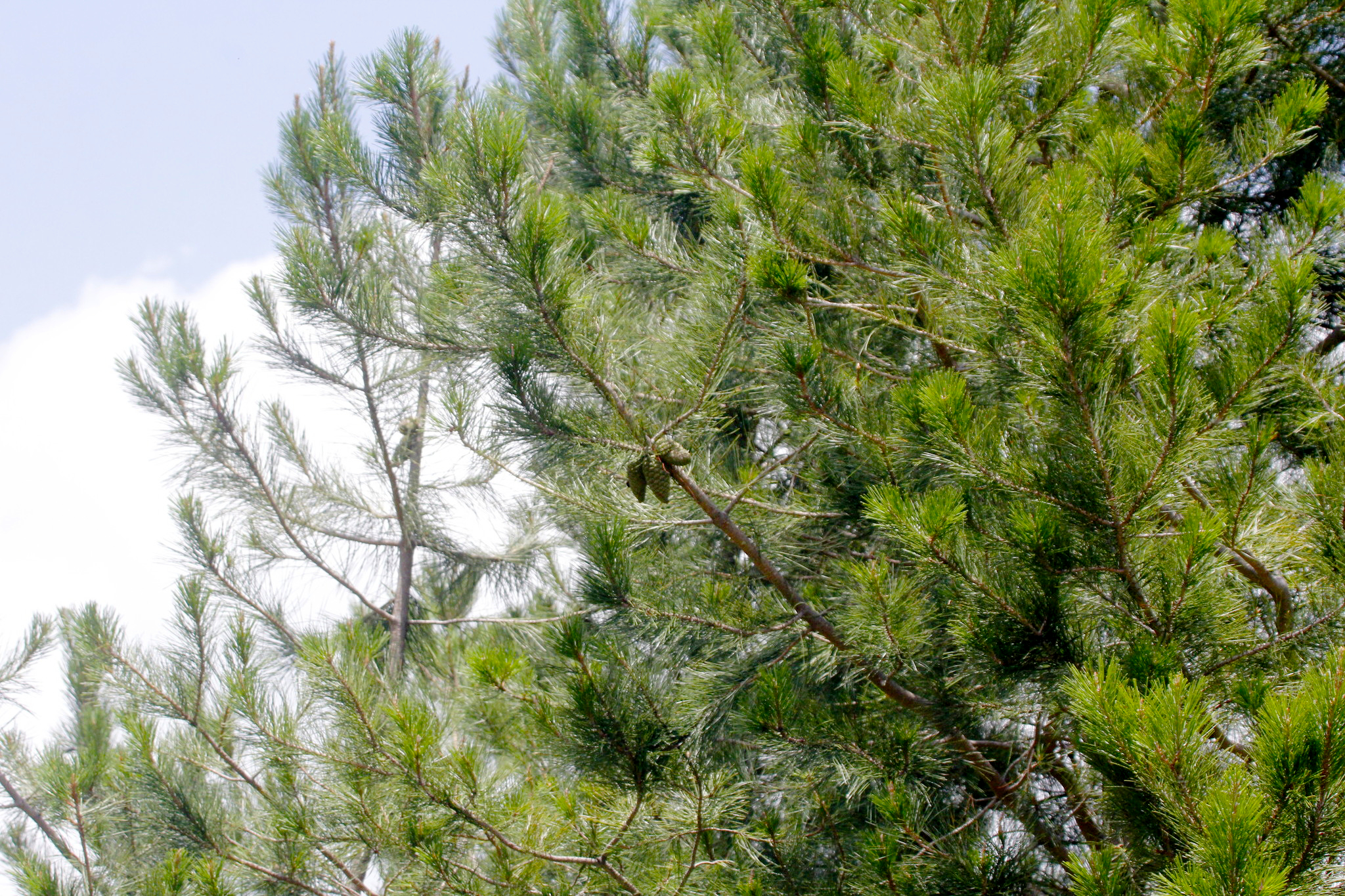
- Pinus greggii var. greggii on Cerro Potosí in northeast Mexico

Conservation status
- Near Threatened (IUCN 3.1)

Scientific classification
- Kingdom: Plantae
- Clade: Tracheophytes
- Clade: Gymnosperms
- Division: Pinophyta
- Class: Pinopsida
- Order: Pinales
- Family: Pinaceae
- Genus: Pinus
- Subgenus: P. subg. Pinus
- Section: P. sect. Trifoliae
- Subsection: P. subsect. Australes
- Species: P. greggii

Binomial name
- Pinus greggii Engelm. ex Parl.
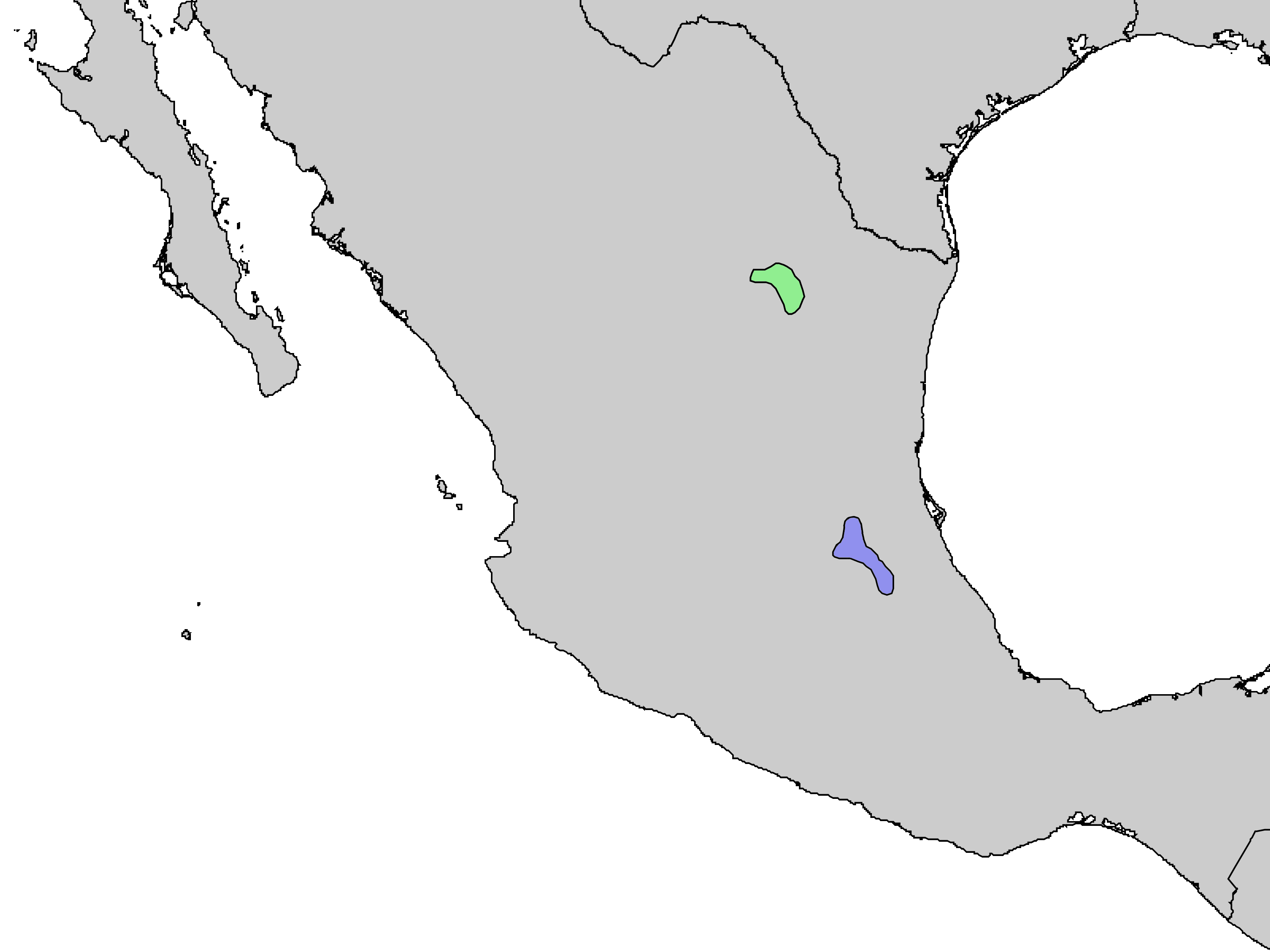
- Natural range: Green: Pinus greggii var. greggii Blue: Pinus greggii var. australis

= Pinus greggii =

Gregg's pine

Species of conifer

Pinus greggii, or Gregg's pine, is a small to medium-sized species of conifer in the family Pinaceae, a pine native to eastern Mexico, found in two distinct regions. It has an open crown and long and slender branches. The needles are in bundles of three with an average length of 11 cm. The cones are produced singly or in groups of up to ten. The bark on the upper trunk is smooth. Pinus greggii is introduced in several countries.

== Taxonomy ==
The species was described by George Engelmann in 1868.

Two varieties are accepted, sometimes treated at the higher rank of subspecies.

- Pinus greggii Engelm. ex Parl. var. greggii
- Pinus greggii Engelm. ex Parl. var. australis Donahue & Lopez, occurring in east-central Mexico in San Luis Potosi, Querétaro, Hidalgo, and Puebla

The species is named after Josiah Gregg (1806–1850), a merchant, explorer, naturalist, and author of the American Southwest and Northern Mexico.

== Description ==
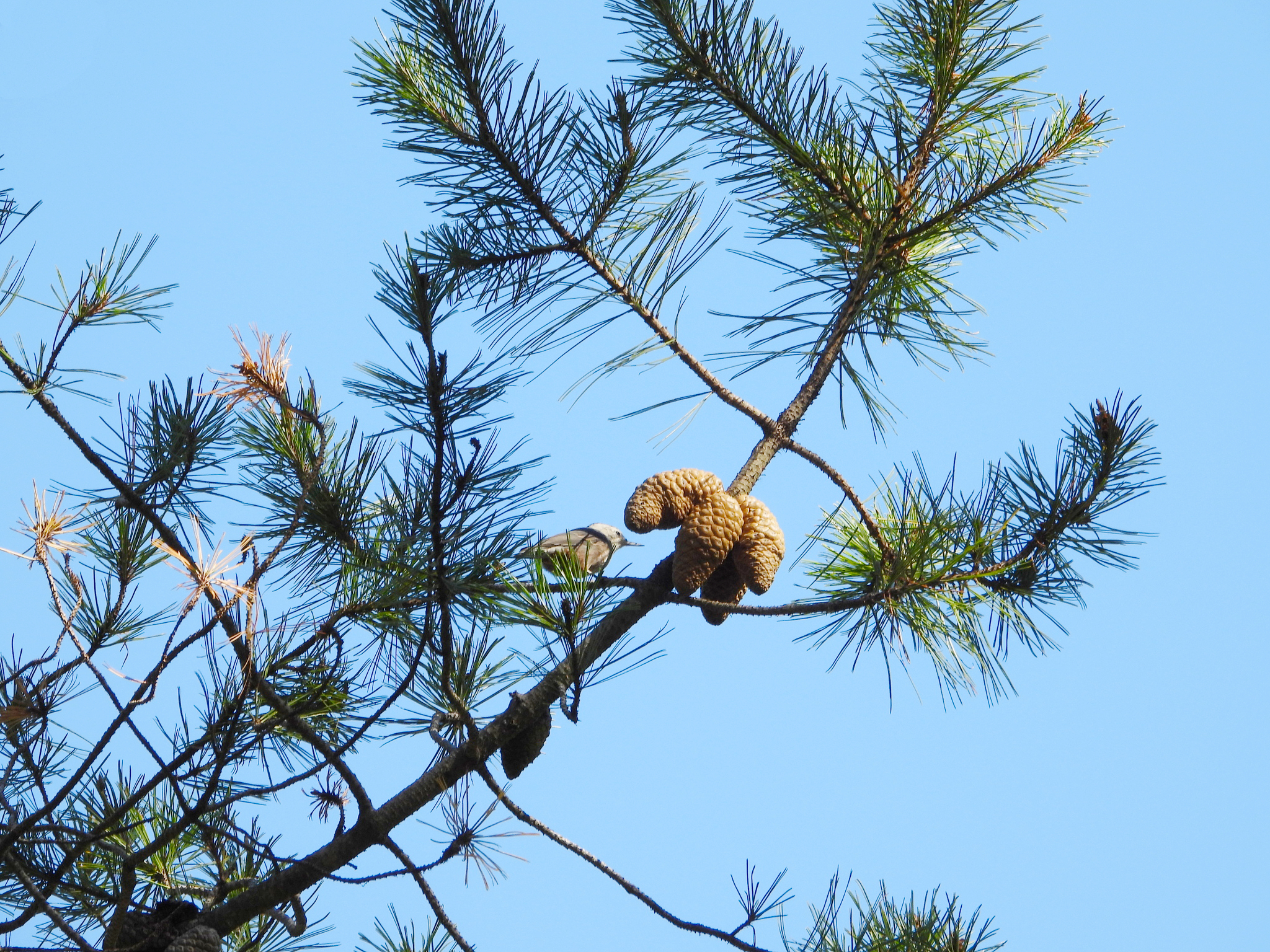
Foliage and cones of Pinus greggii var. greggii near Saltillo, Coahuila

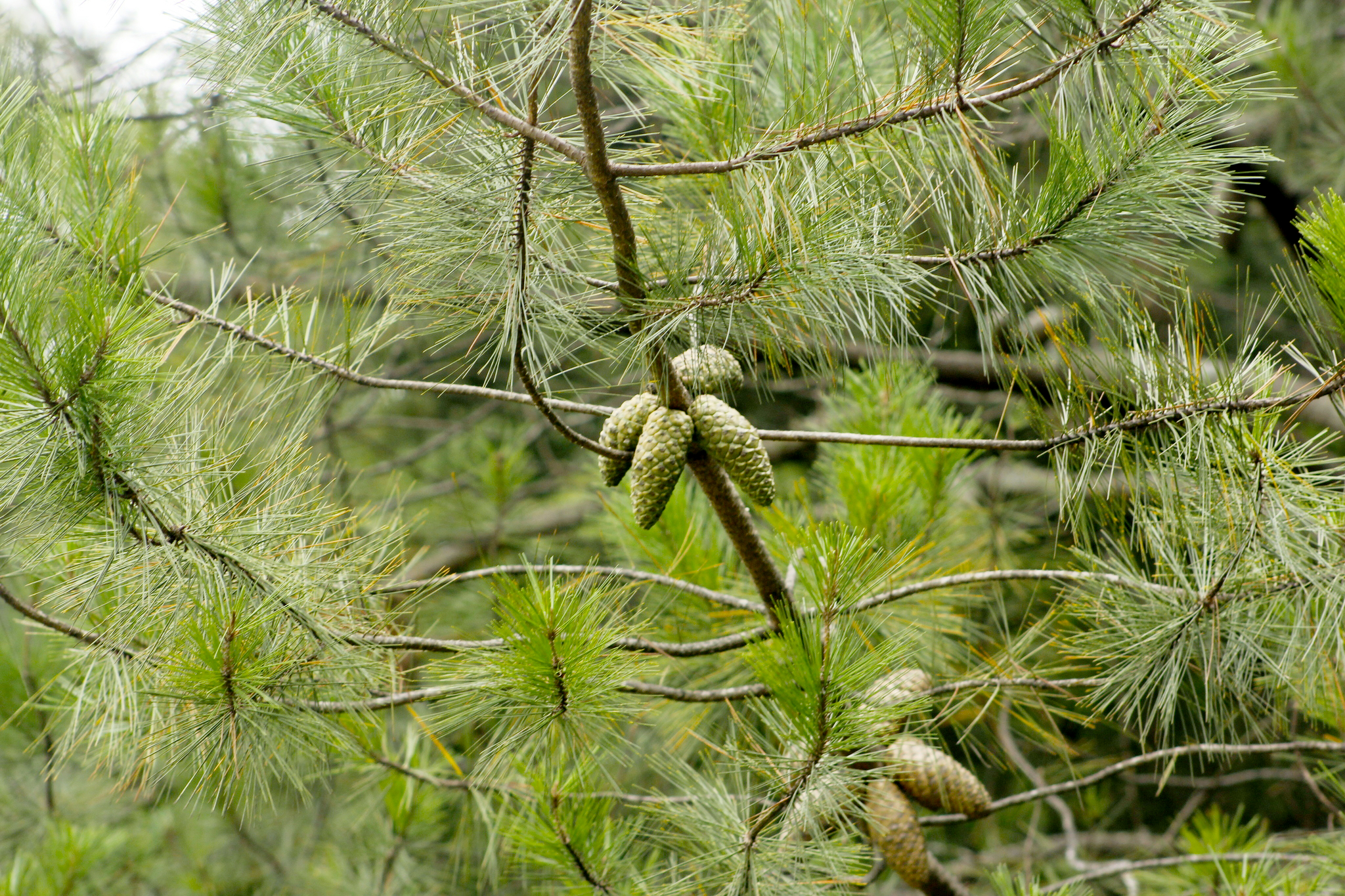
Foliage and cones of Pinus greggii var. australis at Xilitla, San Luis Potosí

Pinus greggiii is a small to medium-sized tree, reaching a height of 15–25 m.

The bark remains smooth for a long time in this species, and only old trees have rough bark at the base of the trunk, where it becomes thick, with deep, longitudinal fissures and rough, elongated plates. On the upper part of the trunk and branches, it remains smooth to scaly, and greyish-brown.

The crown is loose and open. The branches are long and slender, spreading or curved downward, not pendulous, forming a rounded, dense or more open crown. The young twigs are bluish-green with a glaucous wax bloom at first, becoming reddish brown to grey-brown later.

The winter buds are narrow and sharp pointed, without resin and with loose scales, usually light-brown.

The needles are (7-)9-13(-15) cm x 1-1.2mm bright lustrous green, in fascicles of three, and with a short basal sheath.

The pollen cones are crowded near the basal end of a new shoot. They are subtended by broad, scarious bracts, spreading, ovoid-oblong to cylindrical, 15–20 × 5–6 mm, yellowish, turning yellowish brown.

The seed cones are (6-)8–13(-15) cm long 3.5–5 cm wide when closed, opening to (4-)5–7 cm wide, light buff-brown when ripe, long, often slightly curved, and remain closed for many years until opened by the heat of forest fires, enabling seed release just after the fire. They have an irregular conical shape. They are found singly or in clusters of up to 5–10 on the branches. In its native environment Pinus greggii begins flower and cone production at approximately 4 to 5 years of age. The cones ripen in December and January, approximately 21 months after pollination.

The apophysis has a weak transverse keel and a blunt umbo.

Pinus greggii is closely related to, and has been crossed successfully with, Pinus patula. The main morphological difference with the latter species is found in the needles, with those of P. patula are longer and drooping; the cones of P. patula are also smaller, under 10 cm long. The bark is also different.

== Distribution ==
Pinus greggii is found in Mexico in the Sierra Madre Oriental, only in a limited area in the states of Coahuila, Nuevo León and Hidalgo. It occurs farther north than its close relative, Pinus patula, though the range of var. australis overlaps slightly. Natural hybrids exist and that artificial hybrids have been successfully made.

Dvorak states that Pinus greggii occurs in two distinct geographic regions in Mexico: a northern population in the States of Coahuila and Nuevo León (24° to 25° N latitude), and a southern population in the States of Puebla, San Luis Potosí, Hidalgo, Querétaro, and Veracruz (20° to 21° N). There is a gap of 360 km between these two populations. There are differences in needle and cone morphology and seed size between the two populations. There are also differences in ecology and size of trees.

== Ecology ==
In its natural habitat Pinus greggiii grows in the cool highlands, at altitudes between 1300–2600 m; in the northern part of its distribution at 2300–2700m. Annual precipitation is 600–800 mm in much of its range, except on the east escarpment of the mountain ranges along the Hidalgo-Veracruz borderline, where it is 1000–1600 mm. In the north it is more often found on slightly alkaline soils (pH 7–8); in the south on acid soils (pH 4–5).

It has more resistance to frost than most other Mexican pines, particularly in the range of nominate var. greggii, where temperatures down to -15°C have been recorded during norte events in Galeana, Nuevo León (1700 m), and lower than that in the mountains where P. greggii occurs; it is also hardy in cultivation in England, including surviving the severe 1946–47 and 1962–1963 winters at Bedgebury Pinetum. Usually the climate is rather humid in these mountains of northeastern Mexico.

It is nowhere abundant in its scattered range, and always occurred mixed with e.g. Quercus, Platanus, Liquidambar, Fraxinus, and other pines, like P. montezumae, Pinus patula, P. stormiae, P. stylesii, and P. teocote; with P. cembroides and Juniperus flaccida on dry sites; and at higher and more mesic locations with Abies vejarii, Pseudotsuga menziesii or Cupressus arizonica.

== Cultivation and introductions ==
The first recorded introduction of Pinus greggii was to Britain in about 1905 from the northern population; two specimens were at first grown under glass at Kew but then moved to outdoor planting at Bedgebury in 1926; one of these died in 1965, the other survived until the mid 1970s, by which time other introductions had been made. One was also planted at Fota in Ireland in 1911. Other introductions from the southern population have been made to approximately 10 countries in the subtropics between the 1960s and 1980s. Trials from both northern and southern populations were carried out in Brazil, Colombia, New Zealand, South Africa, and Zimbabwe in the late 1980s. These trials have resulted in plantations on a limited scale (e.g. 1000 ha per year in South Africa). Pinus greggii is also introduced in Italy, India, Nepal and Argentina.

== Literature ==
- Dvorak, W. S. Pinus greggii. In: Vozzo, J.A. Tropical Tree Seed Manual. United States Department of Agriculture; Forest Service. 2003. p. 615–617. online available as pdf
- Farjon, Aljos. Pines; drawings and descriptions of the genus Pinus. Publ. Brill / Backhuys, Leiden 1984
- Farjon, Aljos & Brian T. Styles. Pinus (Pinaceae). Monograph 75 of Flora Neotropica. New York Botanical Garden, New York 1997
- Farjon, Aljos. World checklist and bibliography of Conifers. 2nd ed. Royal Botanic Gardens, Kew 2001
- den Ouden, P. & Dr. B.K. Boom. Manual of Cultivated Conifers, ed. Martinus Nijhoff, The Hague 1965
- Shaw, George Russell. The genus Pinus. Cambridge 1914. online in gutenberg.org. With beautiful drawing.
- van Wyk, G. Pinus greggii. In: Pines of Silvicultural Importance. Compiled from the Forestry Compendium, CAB International. Edition: illustrated. Published by CABI, 2002. ISBN 0-85199-539-X, ISBN 978-0-85199-539-7, p. 144f. Online available at Google Books
