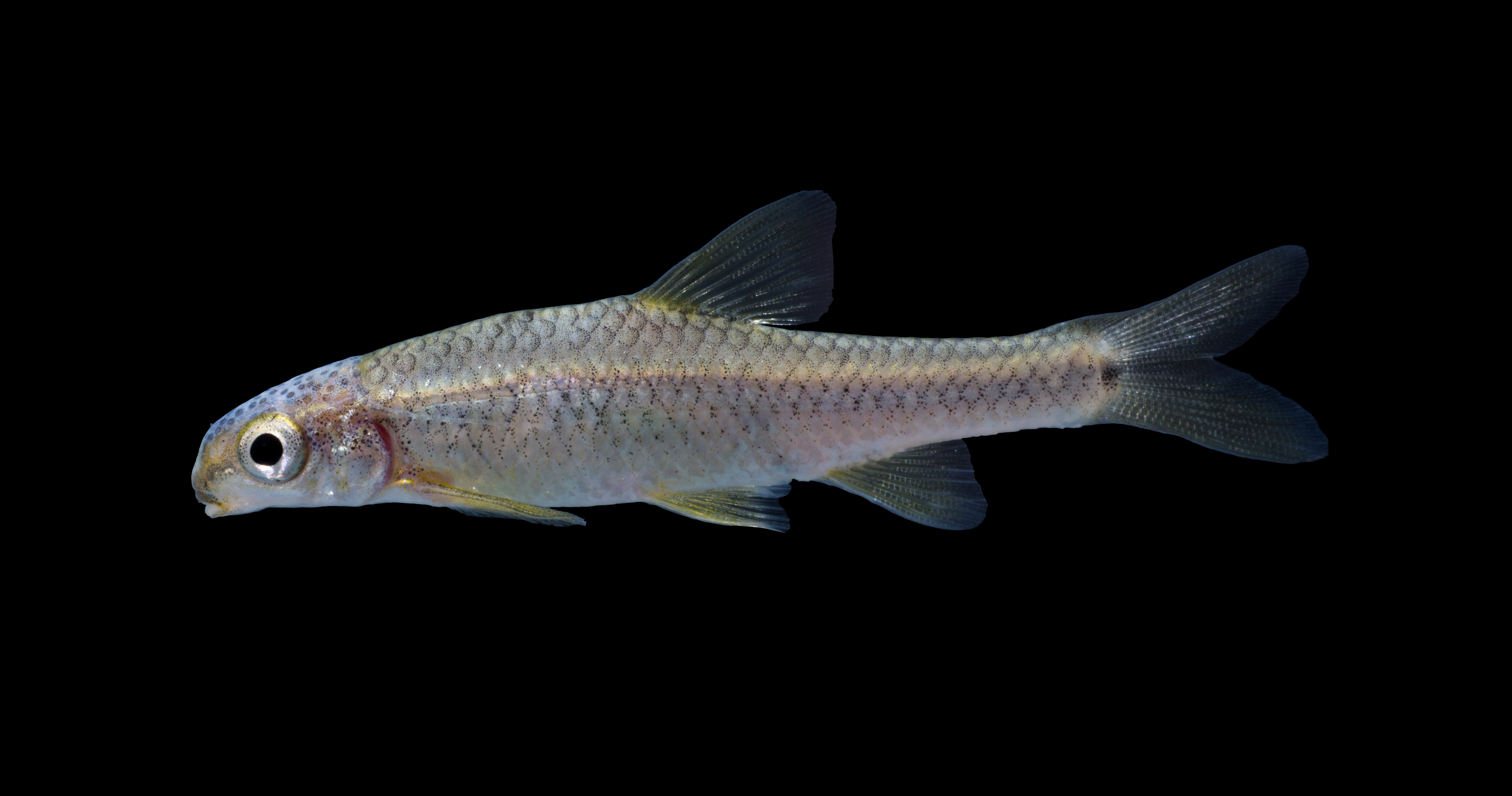

Conservation status
- Endangered (IUCN 3.1)

Scientific classification
- Kingdom: Animalia
- Phylum: Chordata
- Class: Actinopterygii
- Division: Teleostei
- Order: Cypriniformes
- Family: Leuciscidae
- Subfamily: Pogonichthyinae
- Genus: Dionda
- Species: D. diaboli

Binomial name
- Dionda diaboli C. Hubbs & W. H. Brown, 1957

= Devils River minnow =

Species of fish

The Devils River minnow (Dionda diaboli) is a species of freshwater ray-finned fish in the family Leuciscidae, the shiners, daces and minnows. The minnow coexists with other closely related species and other cyprinids in the range of northern Mexico and southern Texas.

== Habitat ==
The minnow lives in freshwater, spring fed streams and tributaries that have fast flowing water over particular gravel cobble substrate that are associated with aquatic macrophytes. The minnows may also inhabit spring runs and rivers.

== Distribution ==
The Devils River minnow is present in the Devils River in southern Texas, the San Felipe Creek, Sycamore Creek, Pinto Creek and Las Moras Creek in Val Verde County and Kinney County in southern Texas. There are also records in Coahuila, Mexico, the Río San Carlos, and Río Salado drainages in the 1970s. Though the minnow's current status in northern Mexico remains unknown, the abundance is thought to be rare.

== Physical appearance ==
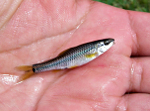
Adult in hand

The Devils River minnow has its dorsal and dorsal lateral scales darkly outlined, double dashes along the lateral line, and a long dark lateral stripe through its snout and eye. It can also be characterized by a black spot on its wedge shaped caudal fin and a cross hatched appearance on its body. The eye shape is round during its larval stage and can be compared to other minnow species larvae that have more of an oval shape. Adults can range from sizes of 25 to 55 millimeters, or approximately one to two inches. The distinct shape of the intestines also distinguishes it from other herbivore minnows. The intestines of the Devil's River minnow are more multi-looped and convoluted in the larval and juvenile stages compared to the same structures in minnows that eat insects, which are generally straight and turn into an s-shape during the larval and juvenile stages.

== Life history ==
The life expectancy based on similar minnows can be estimated in a range of one to two years. It has been reported that the offspring eggs are slightly yellow and transparent in color. The Devils River minnow mating is likely to produce non-adhesive and demersal eggs in the spring, which is similar to traits of Dionda serena and Dionda episcopa. Breeding males develop a blue-green coloration on their body with yellow on the fins when ready to mate. The species' spawning season occurs during springtime. Not much else is known on the Devils River minnow's life history, reproduction rate or habits at this time.

== Diet ==
Based on the examinations of the long coiled intestinal tract of the fish, the minnow feeds on various types of algae. Little else is known about the diet and food habits of the minnow; more experimentation or observation of captive fish should be done.

== Species status ==
The Devils River minnow is classified as endangered by the IUCN Red List. This species was first registered as vulnerable in 1999, although many activists pushed for it to be included as early as 1978. Many conservationists also insist that vulnerable is too weak of a categorization, as no formal habitat protections are included. Even the current recovery plan approved by the U.S. Fish and Wildlife Service in 2005 only involves voluntary conservation efforts.

== Anthropogenic effects ==
The fragile status of this species is due to the culmination of many factors. Human activity has caused a large amount of habitat loss and/or degradation. The Devils River minnow depends on clean, constantly flowing spring waters in order to survive. However, due to both the construction and agricultural industries, the supply of these waters has been dramatically reduced. Agricultural runoff is responsible for most of the pollutants in the minnows' habitat, many of which they cannot tolerate at even slightly increased levels. Dam construction, particularly that of the Amistad Dam, has greatly contributed to spring inundation. Spring flow has also been reduced due to well pumping and overgrazed soil, which lowers the amount of water that can normally be found in natural aquifers. The reduction of these springs has caused the overall quantity and length of the Devils River to dramatically decline. The exact extent of this decline is not known, however, according to United States Geological Survey (USGS) data from the Paffords Crossing gauging station on the Devils River, the daily mean discharge has "generally decreased between 1978 and 1992". Once established populations of the species have now been decimated, primarily in Texas where droughts reduce the supply of groundwater even further. Anthropogenic sources, while some of the major contributors to the Dionda diaboli's decline, are not entirely responsible for its current circumstances.

== Effects of invasive species ==
An additional factor contributing to the status of the Devils River minnow is the introduction of foreign species. Some introduced tropical and game species now compete with the Devils River minnow for food and spatial resources. Several nonnative species of catfish, cichlids, and bass have begun to reduce the minnow species' numbers by feeding on both the minnows themselves and their main diet of algae and microorganisms. Loricariid catfish in particular have established large populations in the Texan habitats of the Devils River Minnow and are steadily consuming most of the available food. Largemouth bass also prey on the species' juveniles during winter months, therefore reducing the amount of reproductively mature individuals. With the number of breeding individuals dwindling, the population is unable to replenish every season, leading to an even more rapid decline. The abundance of the Devils River minnow tends to fluctuate in accordance with the populations of their competitive and predator species The Devils River minnow population is visibly diminishing, but conservation efforts are being implemented in order to curtail this decline.

== Conservation ==
When the Devils River minnows were first classified as threatened in 1999, a group of organizations including the Texas Parks and Wildlife Department, the City of Del Rio, Texas, and the U.S. Fish and Wildlife Service are involved in a Conservation Agreement to assist the minnows' recovery to the point that it is no longer a threatened species. A Devils River minnow Conservation Team was formed as a result of the agreement to enact its provisions. Fortunately, important portions of the species' habitat is owned by the Texas Parks and Wildlife Department and the Nature Conservancy of Texas, but a substantial amount lies on privately owned land, 10. To assist these landowners, the Agreement sought to provide technical assistance to landowners on riparian protection and management, which has been utilized by the City of Del Rio and the San Felipe Country Club for golf course management; the course instituted a 10 to 15 foot zone of no-mowing to improve the San Felipe Creek's water quality.

The main objective of the Conservation Agreement is maintenance of spring flows, as this is the central factor in long-term population growth. Also, a review of live bait harvest and selling practices in the Devils River area was conducted to assess restriction of introduction of other exotic species. As a result, the Texas Parks and Wildlife Department amended its regulations to allow only endemic species as bait. Further research was encouraged to increase knowledge and possible courses of action for conservation of the Devil's River Minnow10.

In 2005, the U.S. Fish and Wildlife Service devised and implemented a long-term recovery plan with the goal of delisting the species. This plan addresses the habitat and exotic species issues and also institutes a life history survey of the Devil's River minnow including an in situ study of smallmouth bass and Devils River minnow predator/prey interaction. Furthermore, a captive, genetically representative population is being maintained for study at TPWD Heart of the Hills Research Station and to reintroduce into wild habitats. The nearby city of Del Rio agreed to reduce water consumption by 10–20% and is limiting population density in the areas surrounding San Felipe Creek. Pollutant reduction from point and non-point sources is being assessed by water-quality controls. Though the plan is detailed and clearly laid out, as of April 2011, only seven out of thirty-five steps are listed as ongoing despite nearly six years since implementation.

As per the Endangered Species Act of 1973, the U.S. Fish and Wildlife Service designated 26.5-stream-kilometers critical habitat for the Devils River minnow in 2008. This range lies in the Val Verde and Kinney Counties, Texas and encompasses Devils River, San Felipe, Pinto, Sycamore, and Las Moras Creeks. The Dionda diaboli continue to be monitored for the effects of the various conservation actions.
