= Guadalupe roundhouse minnow =

Conservation status
- Least Concern (IUCN 3.1)

Scientific classification
- Kingdom: Animalia
- Phylum: Chordata
- Class: Actinopterygii
- Order: Cypriniformes
- Family: Leuciscidae
- Subfamily: Pogonichthyinae
- Genus: Dionda
- Species: D. nigrotaeniata

Binomial name
- Dionda nigrotaeniata Cope, 1880

Species of fish

The Guadalupe roundnose minnow (Dionda nigrotaeniata) is a species of freshwater ray-finned fish in the family Leuciscidae, the shiners, daces and minnows. It is found in the Colorado and San Antonio Rivers in Texas.
