= Santiago, Nuevo León =

City in Nuevo León, Mexico

Santiago
- Seat
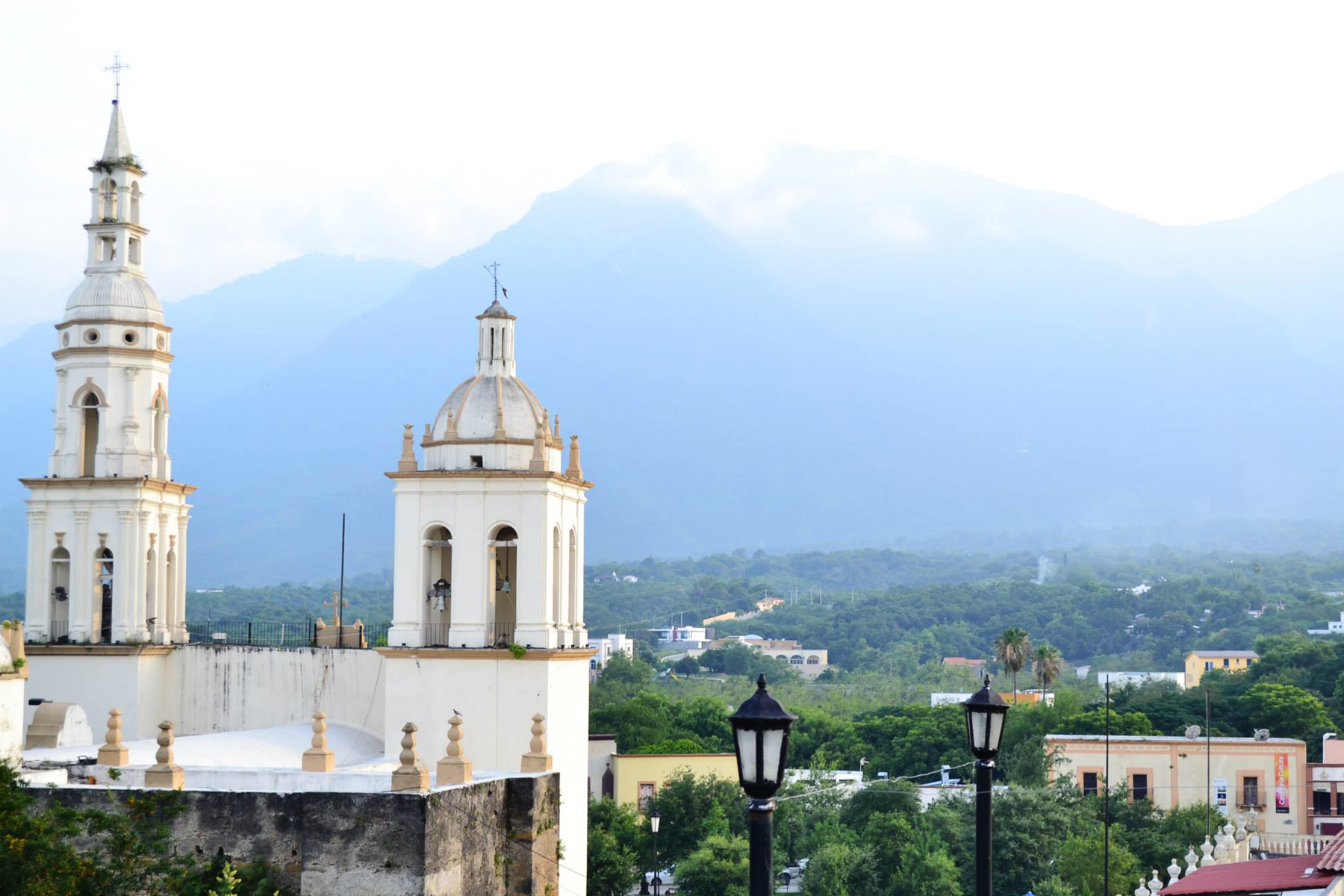
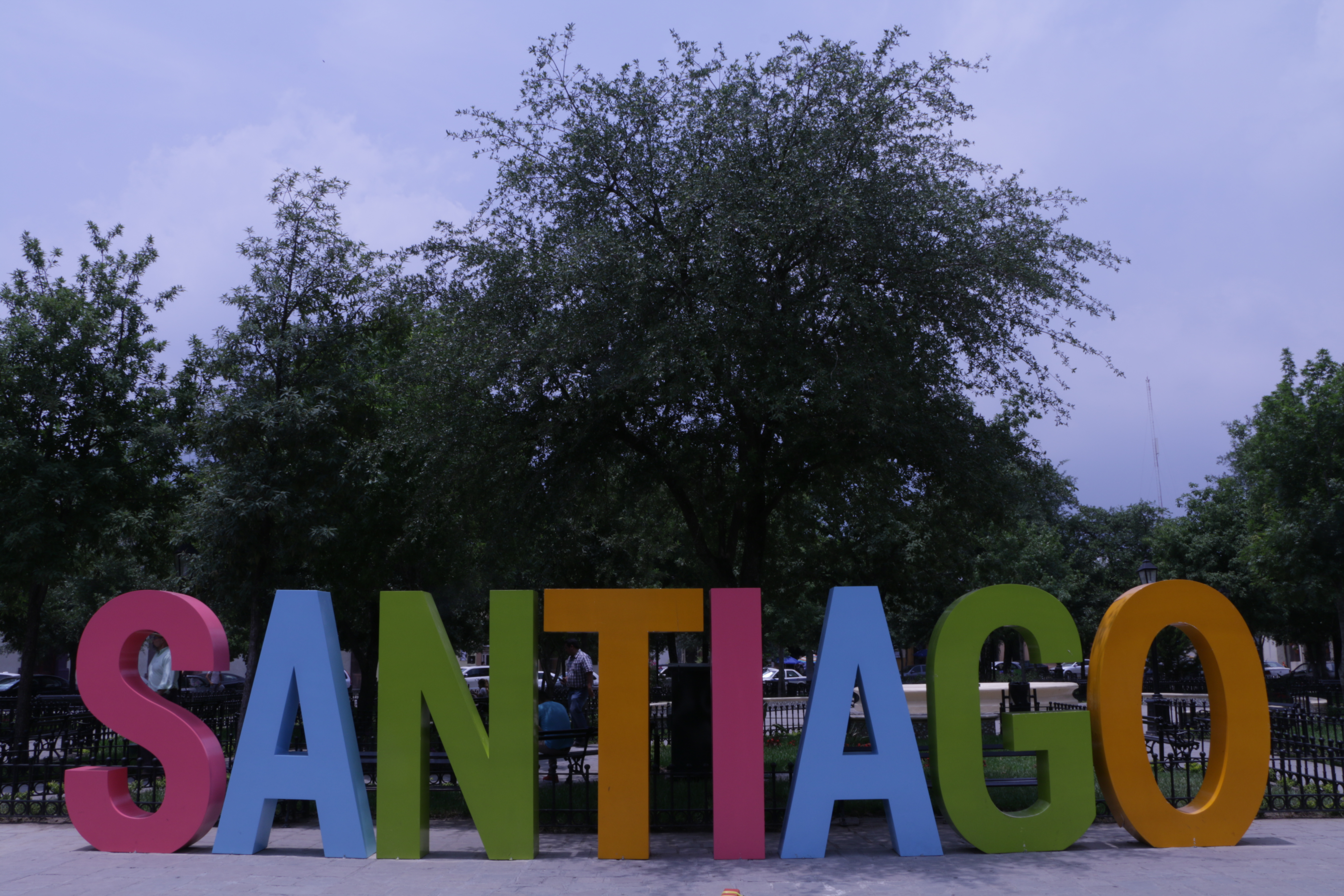
- Church of Santiago Letters in Ocampo Plaza
- Motto: Cultura y Progreso
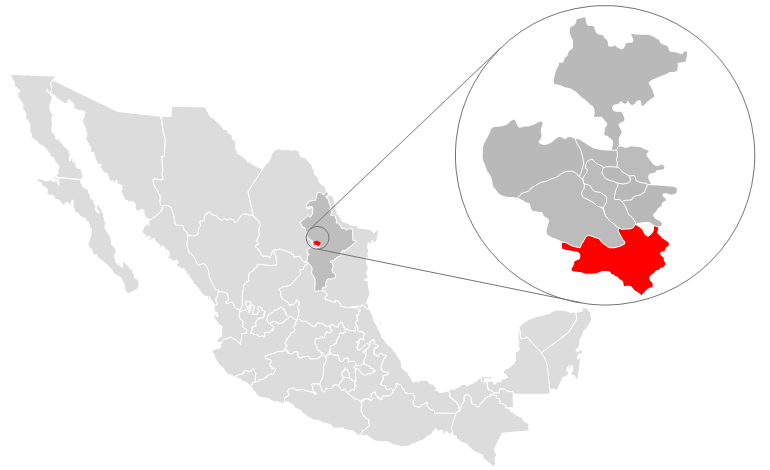
- Coordinates: 25°26′N 100°08′W
- Country: Mexico
- State: Nuevo León
- Founded: 1648
- Founded by: Diego Rodríguez de Montemayor

Government
  - Mayor: David de la Peña Marroquin (PRI)
  - Federal electoral district: Nuevo León's 9th

Area
  - Municipality: 739.2 km^{2} (285.4 sq mi)
  - City: 68.47 km^{2} (26.44 sq mi)
- Elevation: 445 m (1,460 ft)

Population (2020 census)
  - Municipality: 46,784
  - Density: 63.29/km^{2} (163.9/sq mi)
  - Metro: 5,341,177
  - City: 43,019
  - City density: 628.3/km^{2} (1,627/sq mi)
- Time zone: UTC-6 (Zona Centro)
- Website: www.santiago.gob.mx

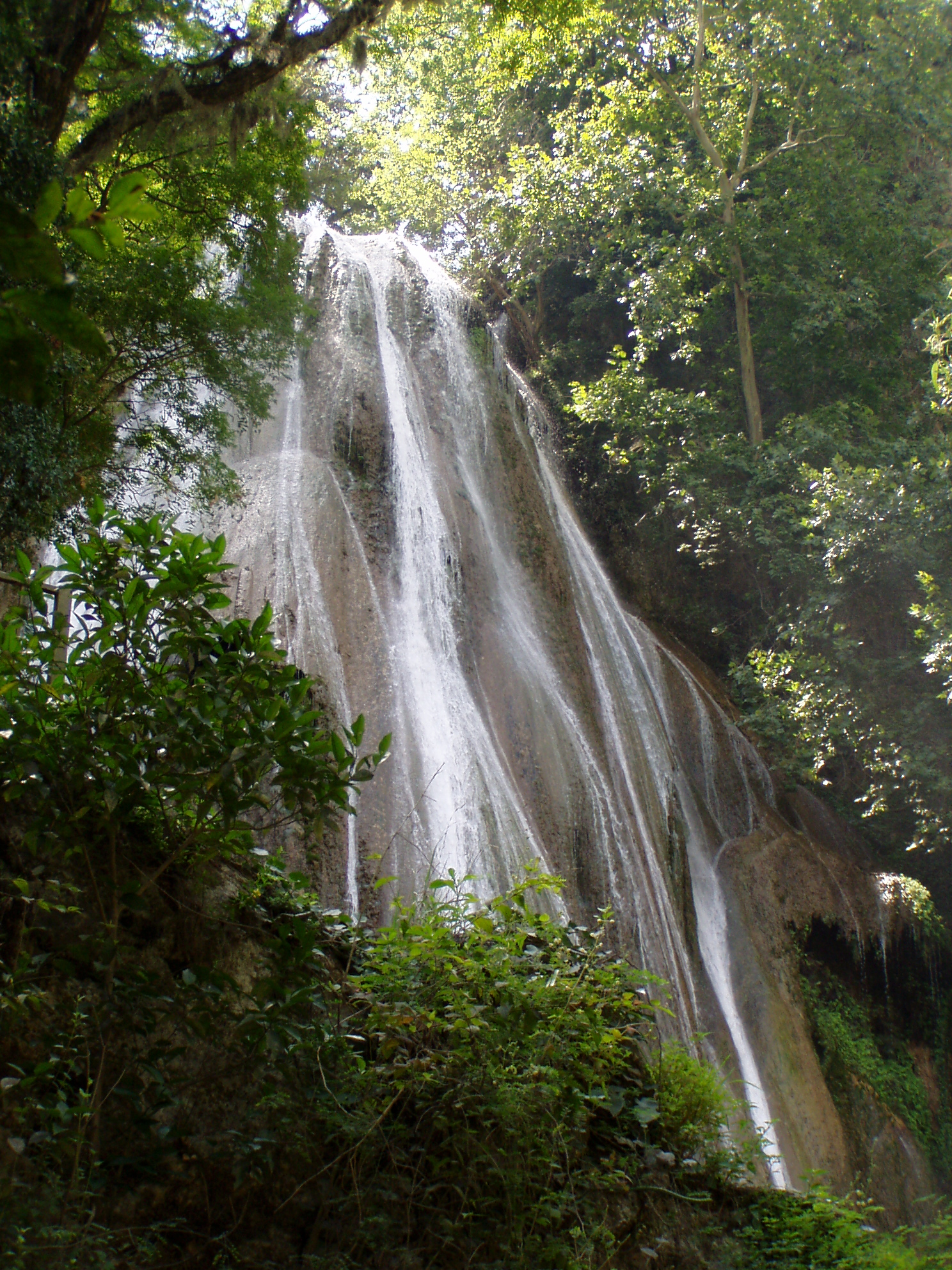
Cola de Caballo waterfall

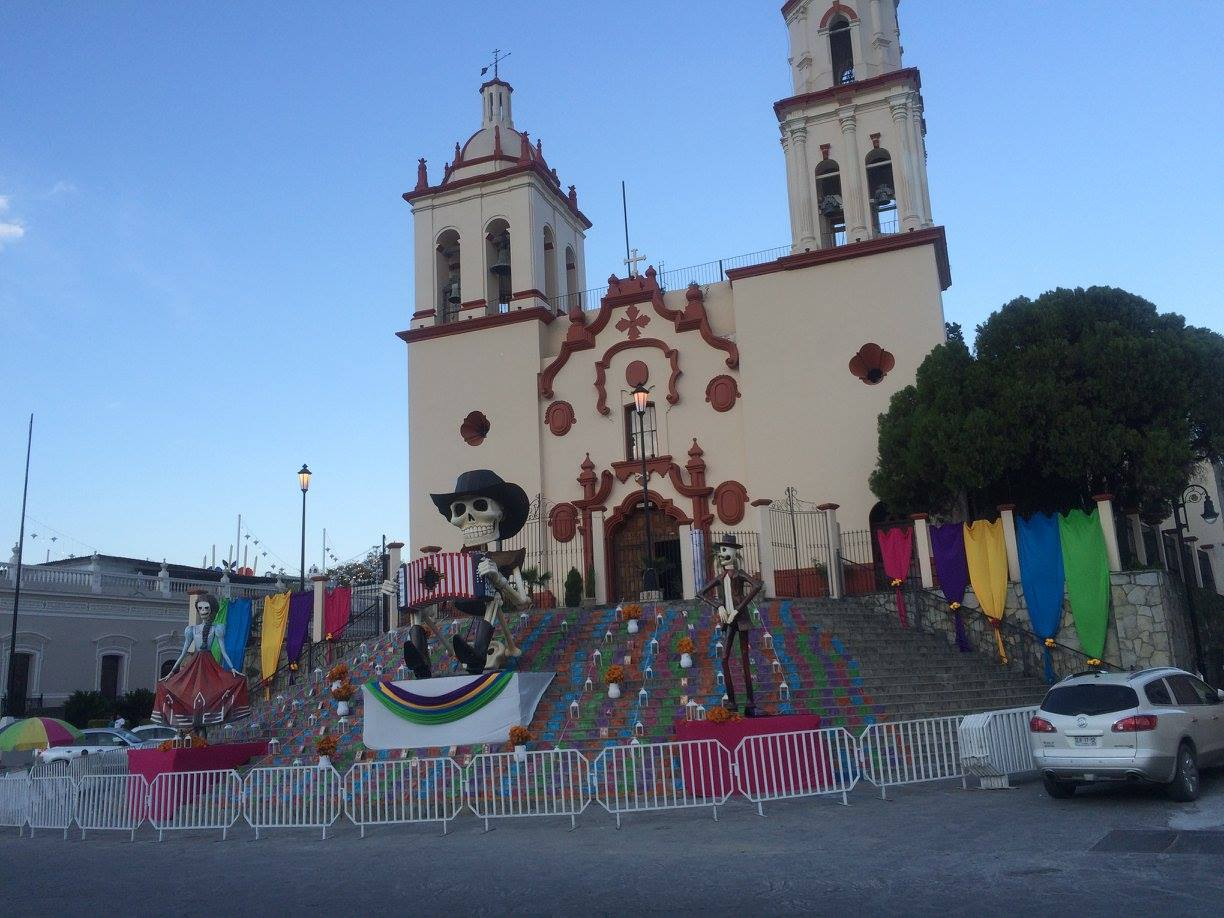
Church of Santiago, Nuevo Leon, Mexico on Dias de los Muertos

Santiago is a municipality and city located in the center of the Mexican state of Nuevo León. It is part of the Monterrey metropolitan area and its area comprises around 739.2 km^{2} (285.4 sq mi). According to the 2020 census, it had a population of 46,784.

Santiago, Nuevo León, was named a "Pueblo Mágico" in 2006 by Mexico's Secretariat of Tourism. Santiago joined the UNESCO Global Network of Learning Cities in 2017.

== History ==
=== First settlement ===
In 1645, Don Diego Rodríguez de Montemayor, great-grandson of Don Diego de Montemayor, requested permission from Governor Don Martín de Zavala to obtain land. His mother, Doña Mónica Rodríguez, already owned properties up to the El Cerrito River in the region known as Las Palmas, so he asked that these be adjacent to his mother's. Zavala verbally granted him permission for the first settlement where today the Héroes del 47 Street intersects with the National Highway.

=== Foundation ===
On March 20, 1646, Martín de Zavala legalized Rodríguez de Montemayor's lands with official documentation. The land stretched from the Cerrito River to the San Juan River, now known as Escamilla. Official documents grant him eight caballerías of land and two cattle sites. Two years later, Diego Rodríguez de Montemayor negotiated with his uncle Gregorio Fernández de Montemayor to acquire the territory of the Escamilla stream, extending towards the Ramos River. In 1650, Diego Rodríguez de Montemayor married Inés de la Garza, with whom he had 12 children, but shortly thereafter they decided to leave the area.

== Geography ==
Santiago is a municipality located in the center of the Mexican state of Nuevo León. It is part of the Monterrey metropolitan area and its area comprises around 739.2 km^{2} (285.4 sq mi).

=== Nature ===
"La Boca" Dam, one of the water reservoirs serving the metropolitan area, is located within the municipality. "Cola de Caballo" is a famous waterfall and tourist attraction.

=== Climate ===
Santiago has a humid subtropical climate (Köppen climate classification Cwa) with cool, dry winters and hot and humid summers. It is receives almost twice as much rain as nearby Monterrey.

Climate data for Santiago, Nuevo Leon (1951-2010)
Month	Jan	Feb	Mar	Apr	May	Jun	Jul	Aug	Sep	Oct	Nov	Dec	Year
Record high °C (°F)	34.5 (94.1)	40.5 (104.9)	42.0 (107.6)	43.0 (109.4)	45.0 (113.0)	43.5 (110.3)	43.5 (110.3)	42.5 (108.5)	41.5 (106.7)	40.2 (104.4)	36.2 (97.2)	36.5 (97.7)	45.0 (113.0)
Mean daily maximum °C (°F)	19.8 (67.6)	21.8 (71.2)	26.1 (79.0)	29.0 (84.2)	31.3 (88.3)	33.4 (92.1)	34.0 (93.2)	34.2 (93.6)	30.5 (86.9)	27.0 (80.6)	23.1 (73.6)	19.7 (67.5)	27.5 (81.5)
Daily mean °C (°F)	12.9 (55.2)	14.7 (58.5)	18.6 (65.5)	22.2 (72.0)	25.1 (77.2)	27.2 (81.0)	27.5 (81.5)	27.5 (81.5)	24.9 (76.8)	21.2 (70.2)	16.9 (62.4)	13.2 (55.8)	21.0 (69.8)
Mean daily minimum °C (°F)	6.0 (42.8)	7.5 (45.5)	11.2 (52.2)	15.3 (59.5)	19.0 (66.2)	21.0 (69.8)	20.9 (69.6)	20.8 (69.4)	19.3 (66.7)	15.5 (59.9)	10.6 (51.1)	6.7 (44.1)	14.5 (58.1)
Record low °C (°F)	−8.5 (16.7)	−3.5 (25.7)	−2.0 (28.4)	1.5 (34.7)	8.0 (46.4)	10.0 (50.0)	12.0 (53.6)	13.0 (55.4)	7.0 (44.6)	2.0 (35.6)	−2.0 (28.4)	−7.0 (19.4)	−8.5 (16.7)
Average precipitation mm (inches)	24.9 (0.98)	21.3 (0.84)	28.0 (1.10)	53.3 (2.10)	83.8 (3.30)	130.2 (5.13)	121.9 (4.80)	150.8 (5.94)	296.8 (11.69)	122.2 (4.81)	25.7 (1.01)	21.2 (0.83)	1,080.1 (42.52)
Average precipitation days (≥ 0.1 mm)	5.9	5.8	5.2	7.0	9.3	8.7	7.2	8.8	11.9	8.2	5.9	5.6	89.5
Source: Servicio Meteorológico National
