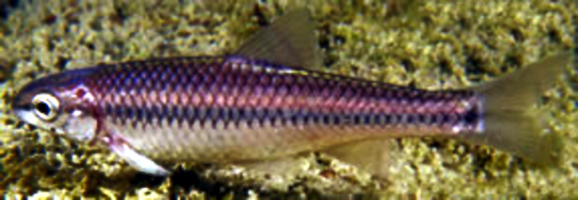
- Devils River minnow (Dionda diaboli)

Scientific classification
- Kingdom: Animalia
- Phylum: Chordata
- Class: Actinopterygii
- Order: Cypriniformes
- Family: Leuciscidae
- Subfamily: Pogonichthyinae
- Genus: Dionda; Girard, 1856

Type species
- Dionda episcopa Girard, 1856

Species
- See text.

= Dionda =

Genus of fishes

Dionda is the genus of desert minnows, small fish belonging to the family Leuciscidae, the shiners, daces and minnows. They are native to fresh waters in the United States and Mexico. Their range is centered in the Rio Grande basin, but they also occur in associated systems, including Nazas–Aguanaval of north–central Mexico, and Nueces, San Antonio and Colorado of Texas.

These are small fish, no more than 9 cm (3.5 in) long, and overall brownish-silvery with a distinct dark horizontal line from the head to the tail base. They are believed to feed primarily on algae.

== Species ==
These are the species in this genus. Additionally, the species now placed in Tampichthys were formerly included in Dionda instead.

- Dionda argentosa Girard, 1856 (Manantial roundnose minnow)
- Dionda diaboli C. Hubbs & W. H. Brown, 1957 (Devils River minnow)
- Dionda episcopa Girard, 1856 (Roundnose minnow)
- Dionda flavipinnis (Cope, 1880)
- Dionda melanops Girard, 1856 (Spotted minnow)
- Dionda nigrotaeniata (Cope, 1880) (Guadalupe roundnose minnow)
- Dionda serena Girard, 1856 (Nueces roundnose minnow)
- Dionda texensis Girard, 1856
