= La Sepultura Biosphere Reserve =

Biosphere reserve in Mexico

- IUCN category Ia (strict nature reserve)– core zone only
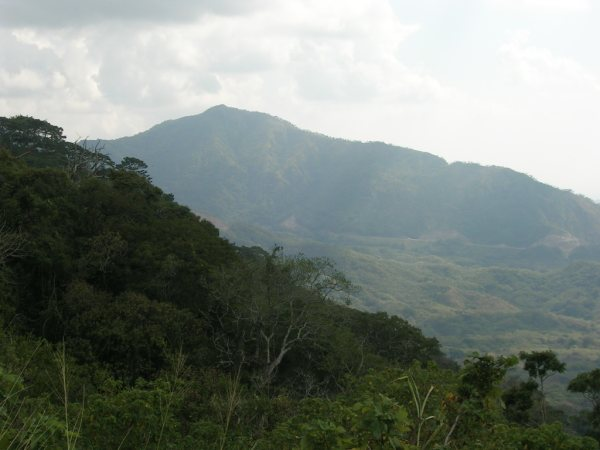
- La Sepultura mountain

- Location within Mexico
- Location: Chiapas, Mexico
- Coordinates: 16°17′37″N 93°45′47″W
- Area: 1,673.1 km^{2} (646.0 sq mi)
- Designation: UNESCO-MAB Biosphere Reserve
- Designated: 1995 (national) 2006 (international)
- Administrator: National Commission of Natural Protected Areas

La Sepultura is a biosphere reserve in southern Mexico. It protects a portion of the Sierra Madre de Chiapas range in the state of Chiapas.

== Geography ==
La Sepultura Biosphere Reserve covers the western end of the Sierra Madre de Chiapas. The Zona de Protección Forestal en los terrenos que se encuentran en los municipios de La Concordia, Angel Albino Corzo, Villa Flores y Jiquipilas, a natural resources protection area, lies east of la Sepultura, covering the northern slopes of the Sierra.

The northern slopes of the Sierra descend to the Chiapas Depression, which is drained by the Grijalva River and its tributaries (including the Río La Venta), which eventually empty into the Gulf of Mexico. The southern slopes are drained by numerous smaller rivers and streams, descending to the narrow coastal plain and emptying into the Pacific Ocean.

== Flora and fauna ==
La Sepultura Biosphere Reserve is home to a range of ecosystems, which vary with the elevation, exposure, flora and soil composition. These include lowland deciduous forest and tropical dry forest, mid-elevation evergreen tropical forest (including areas of humid cloud forest), and montane pine–oak forests, which include pine–oak, pine–oak–liquidambar, and pine savanna. Native trees include Ulmus mexicana, Manilkara zapota, Triplaris melaenodendron, Cedrela odorata, Liquidambar styraciflua, Haematoxylum brasiletto, and Croton guatemalensis.

At the top of the food chain, the ecoregion is home to six of the seven Mexican species of felids: the jaguar (Panthera onca), puma (Puma concolor), ocelot (Leopardus pardalis), jaguarundi (Herpailurus yagouaroundi), margay (Leopardus weidii) and the oncilla (Leopardus tigrinus), also called the tigrillo. The larger cats follow the movements of their favored prey in the area (which typically includes ungulates and other smaller mammals), such as Baird's tapir (Tapirus bairdii), red brocket deer (Mazama sp.), collared peccary (Dicotyles tajacu), white-lipped peccary (Tayassu pecari) and white-tailed deer (Odocoileus virginianus ssp). Other mammalian species within the reserve include the cacomistle, Geoffroy's spider monkey, gray fox (Urocyon cinereoargenteus), kinkajou (Potos flavus), mantled howler monkey, neotropical river otter, nine-banded armadillo, northern silky anteater, northern tamandua (Tamandua mexicana), raccoon (Procyon lotor), tayra, white-nosed coatimundi and the Yucatán black howler monkey.

Resident birds include psittaciformes such as the white-fronted (Amazona albifrons) and yellow-naped parrots (Amazona auropalliata), several species of hummingbird, quetzals, toucans, and trogons. Carnivorous and predatory bird species include a range of New World vultures, owls, and raptors, such as the gray hawk (Buteo plagiatus), Swainson's hawk (Buteo swainsoni), solitary eagle (Buteogallus solitarius), king vulture (Sarcoramphus papa), turkey vulture, black vulture, and the peregrine falcon (Falco peregrinus). 90 species of migratory birds visit the reserve.

== Conservation ==
In 1995 the Mexican government designated a portion of La Sepultura as a strict nature reserve, covering an area of 18.12 km^{2}, and an area of 112.14 km^{2} was designated for ecological conservation.

The biosphere reserve was designated by UNESCO in 2006. It covers 1673.1 km^{2}, which includes the strict nature reserve (known as the core zone or zona nucleo), the ecological conservation area, and a portion of the Zona de Protección Forestal.

Portions of the reserve are inhabited, often with traditional forms of land ownership and management. Local economic activities include animal husbandry, agriculture (maize, beans, and other crops), coffee growing, and timber harvesting. Local people also harvest forest products like pine resin and xate palm leaves (Chamaedorea spp.).
