= Cuenca Alimentadora del Distrito Nacional de Riego 004 Don Martín =

Protected natural area

- CADNR 004 Don Martín
- IUCN category VI (protected area with sustainable use of natural resources)
- Location within Mexico
- Coordinates: 27°52′N 101°09′W<rsis/>
- Area: 15,193.85 km^{2} (5,866.38 sq mi)
- Designation: Natural resources protection area
- Designated: 2002
- Administrator: National Commission of Natural Protected Areas

Cuenca Alimentadora del Distrito Nacional de Riego 004 Don Martín, also known as CADNR 004 Don Martín, is a protected natural area in northern Mexico.

== Geography ==
CADNR 004 Don Martín is located in central Coahuila state. It protects portions of the upper watershed of the Salado River and its tributaries, including the Sabinas, Alamós, and Mimbres rivers, which drain the eastern slope of the Sierra Madre Oriental. It includes three separate areas, together covering a total area of 15,193.85 km^{2}.

== Flora and fauna ==
CADNR 004 Don Martín is at the eastern edge of the Chihuahuan Desert, as it transitions to the Tamaulipan mezquital. Plant communities include dry shrubland and dry grassland, with riparian forests and wetlands along watercourses. Oak and pine woodlands and forests occur at higher elevations in the Sierra Madre Oriental.

== Conservation ==
The area was given protected area status on 3 August 1949, by decree of Mexican President Miguel Alemán Valdés, to protect watersheds for the benefit of downstream irrigated farms. It was re-designated a natural resources protection area on 7 November 2002. A portion of the Sabinas River was designated a Ramsar site (wetland of international importance) on 2 February 2008.
