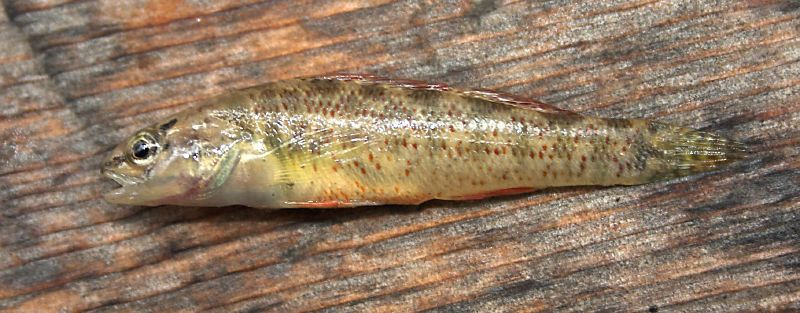

Conservation status
- Vulnerable (IUCN 3.1)

Scientific classification
- Kingdom: Animalia
- Phylum: Chordata
- Class: Actinopterygii
- Division: Teleostei
- Order: Perciformes
- Family: Percidae
- Genus: Etheostoma
- Species: E. grahami

Binomial name
- Etheostoma grahami (Girard, 1859)

Synonyms
- Oligocephalus grahami Girard, 1859

= Rio Grande darter =

Species of fish

The Rio Grande darter (Etheostoma grahami) is a small species of ray-finned fish, a darter from the subfamily Etheostomatinae, part of the family Percidae which includes the perches, ruffs and pike-perches. It is endemic to the lower Rio Grande drainage of the United States and Mexico. It inhabits riffles over substrates of gravel or rubble. This species can reach a length of 6 cm (2.4 in), though most only reach about 3 cm (1.2 in). The Rio Grande darter was first formally described as Oligocephalus grahami in 1859 by the French zoologist Charles Frédéric Girard (1822–1895) with the type locality given as the Devils River in Texas. The specific name honors the American soldier and topographer James Duncan Graham (1795–1865), who led the expedition on which the type was collected by John H. Clark.
