= Cola de Caballo =

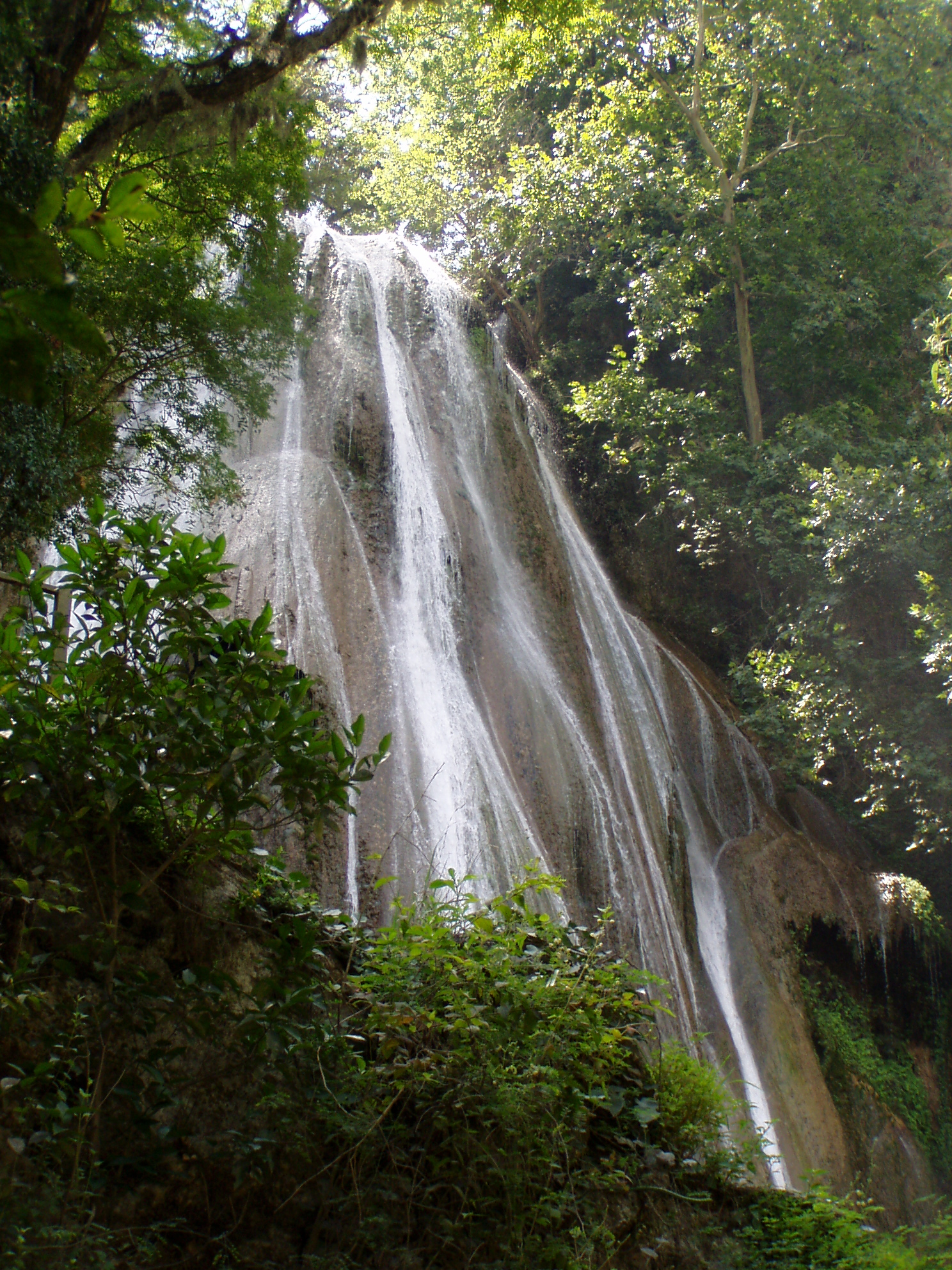
- Cola de Caballo (Horse Tail) Waterfall
- Interactive map of Cola de Caballo
- Location: Santiago, Nuevo León, Mexico
- Coordinates: 25.362317°N 100.163467°W
- Type: Fan
- Total height: 25 metres (82 ft)
- Number of drops: 1
- Longest drop: 25 m (82 ft)

Cola de Caballo (Spanish, 'Horse Tail') is a waterfall about 25 m (25 mi), in the town of Villa de Santiago, Nuevo León. It is open to the public and is accessible via a walking path.

== See also ==
- List of waterfalls
