= Abies hidalgensis =

Conservation status
- Vulnerable (IUCN 3.1)

Scientific classification
- Kingdom: Plantae
- Clade: Tracheophytes
- Clade: Gymnospermae
- Division: Pinophyta
- Class: Pinopsida
- Order: Pinales
- Family: Pinaceae
- Genus: Abies
- Species: A. hidalgensis

Binomial name
- Abies hidalgensis Debreczy, Rácz & Guízar

Species of conifer

Abies hidalgensis is a species of conifer in the pine family, Pinaceae. It is endemic to Mexico, where it is known only from the state of Hidalgo.

This tree was described to science in 1995. It grows in cloud forest habitat with trees and shrubs such as Buddleja cordata, Cupressus lusitanica, and Pinus patula.

This tree has usually a single trunk with branches that ascend and then descend. The crown is columnar to conical in shape with gray-green foliage. The bark is smooth and light gray on young trees, splitting into plates and revealing "blood-red" inner bark on older specimens. The cones are up to 8 by 4 centimeters in size.
