= Spotted minnow =

Scientific classification
- Kingdom: Animalia
- Phylum: Chordata
- Class: Actinopterygii
- Order: Cypriniformes
- Family: Leuciscidae
- Genus: Dionda
- Species: D. melanops

Binomial name
- Dionda melanops Girard, 1856

Species of fish

The spotted minnow (Dionda melanops) is a species of freshwater ray-finned fish in the family Leuciscidae, the shiners, daces and minnows. It is endemic to Mexico.
