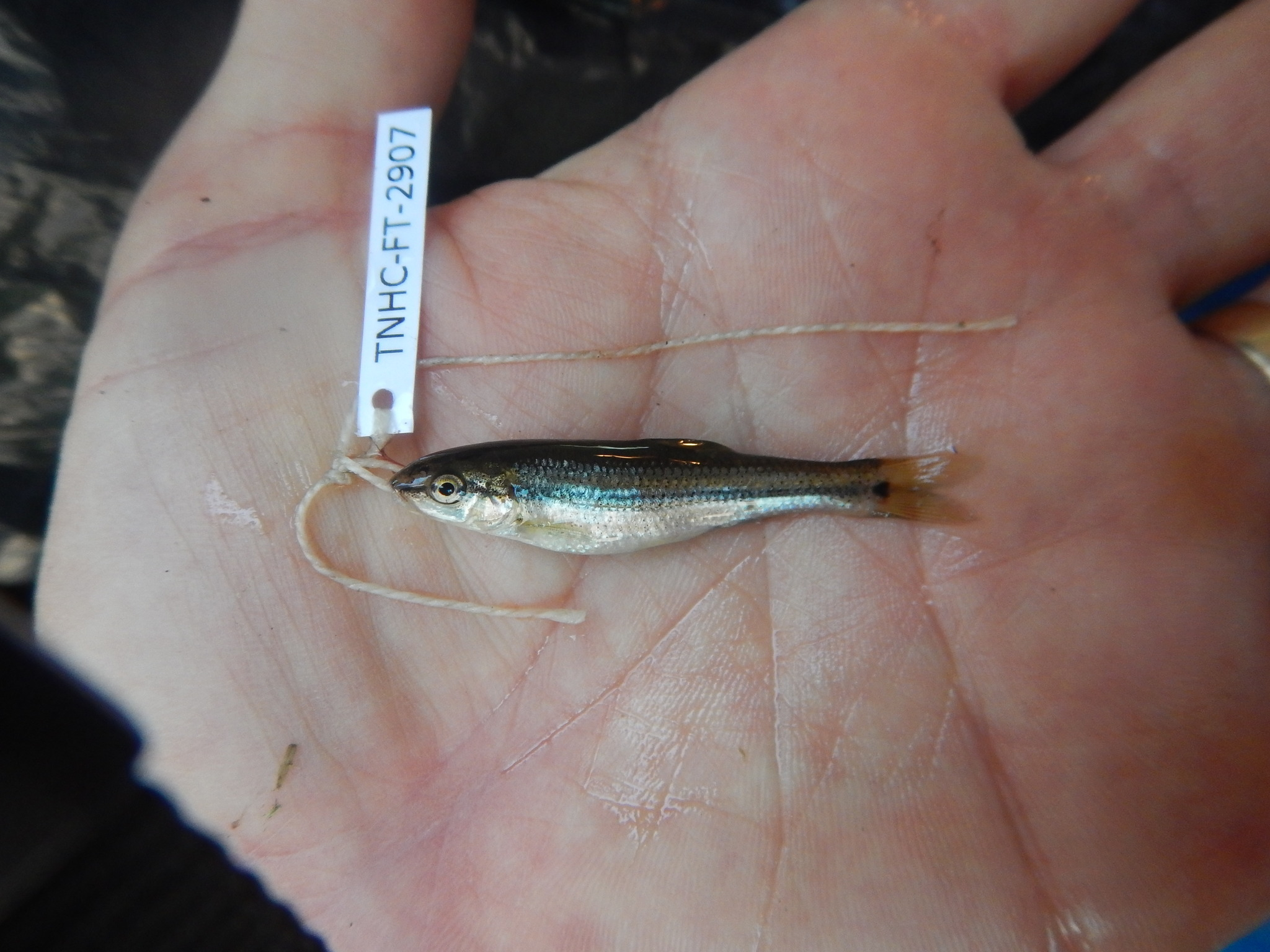

Conservation status
- Least Concern (IUCN 3.1)

Scientific classification
- Kingdom: Animalia
- Phylum: Chordata
- Class: Actinopterygii
- Order: Cypriniformes
- Family: Leuciscidae
- Genus: Dionda
- Species: D. episcopa

Binomial name
- Dionda episcopa Girard, 1856

Synonyms
- Dionda chrysitis Girard, 1856; Dionda papalis Girard, 1856

= Roundnose minnow =

Species of fish

The roundnose minnow (Dionda episcopa) is a species of freshwater ray-finned fish in the family Leuciscidae. This species is endemic to southwestern North America. The genus name Dionda is of Native American origin. The species name episcopa is Latin for "pope", and is named after John Pope who helped lead the party that collected the species holotype.

== Description ==
As the name implies, roundnose minnow have a rounded snout with a small subterminal mouth. They also have 34-45 scales along their lateral line and 8 anal fin rays. Coloration usually includes olive green, white, and shades of yellow with a diagnostic black spot near the caudal fin base.

== Distribution and habitat ==
The roundnose minnow is found in the Colorado, San Antonio, upper Nueces and Rio Grande drainages in Texas and New Mexico in the United States and Mexico. This species is locally abundant and is most common in spring-influenced streams with minimal temperature variation throughout the season.

== Diet ==
Roundnose minnow are generally considered herbivorous. A gut content analysis was conducted in 2008 examining the stomach contents of three individuals from Independence Creek in Terrell County, TX. Stomach contents were primarily amorphous detritus (86.5% ±4.9) followed by filamentous algae (9.3% ± 6.4). Quantities below 2% of diatoms, fungi, and picoplankton were all also present.

== Reproduction ==
Spawning occurs over gravel during the summer.

== Management ==
Little management for roundnose minnow occurs in the United States, as most populations appear stable. They have been used as baitfish in New Mexico.
