= Natural resources protection areas of Mexico =

Mexico's Natural resources protection areas (or Áreas de Protección de Recursos Naturales in Spanish) are nine federally-recognized protected areas in Mexico that are administrated by the federal National Commission of Protected Natural Areas (Comisión Nacional de Áreas Naturales Protegidas, or CONANP).

They are critical natural resources that are preserved and protected, such as water sources and important forest areas.

== List of natural resources protection areas ==
The nine areas are:

- Las Huertas (1.67 km^{2}) in Colima
- Zona Protectora Forestal Vedada Cuenca Hidrográfica del Río Necaxa (421.29 km^{2}) in Puebla
- Zona Protectora Forestal los terrenos constitutivos de las cuencas de los ríos Valle de Bravo, Malacatepec, Tilostoc y Temascaltepec (1,402.34 km^{2}) in Estado de Mexico
- Cuenca Alimentadora del Distrito Nacional de Riego 004 Don Martín (15,193.85 km^{2}) sources of the rivers Sabinas, Alamós, and Salado y Mimbres in Coahuila
- Cuenca Alimentadora del Distrito Nacional de Riego 01 Pabellón (977 km^{2}) in Zacatecas and Aguascalientes
- Cuenca Alimentadora del Distrito Nacional de Riego 043 Estado de Nayarit (23,290.27 km^{2}), as regards the sub-basins of the Ameca, Atenguillo, Bolaños, Grande de Santiago, Juchipila, Atengo, and Tlaltenango rivers in Durango, Jalisco, Nayarit, Aguascalientes, and Zacatecas.
- Zona de Protección Forestal en los terrenos que se encuentran en los municipios de La Concordia, Angel Albino Corzo, Villa Flores y Jiquipilas (1775.46 km^{2}) in Chiapas
- Cuenca Alimentadora del Distrito Nacional de Riego 026 Bajo Río San Juan (1971.57 km^{2}) in Coahuila and Nuevo Leon
- Quebrada de Santa Bárbara (0.66 km^{2}) in Durango
