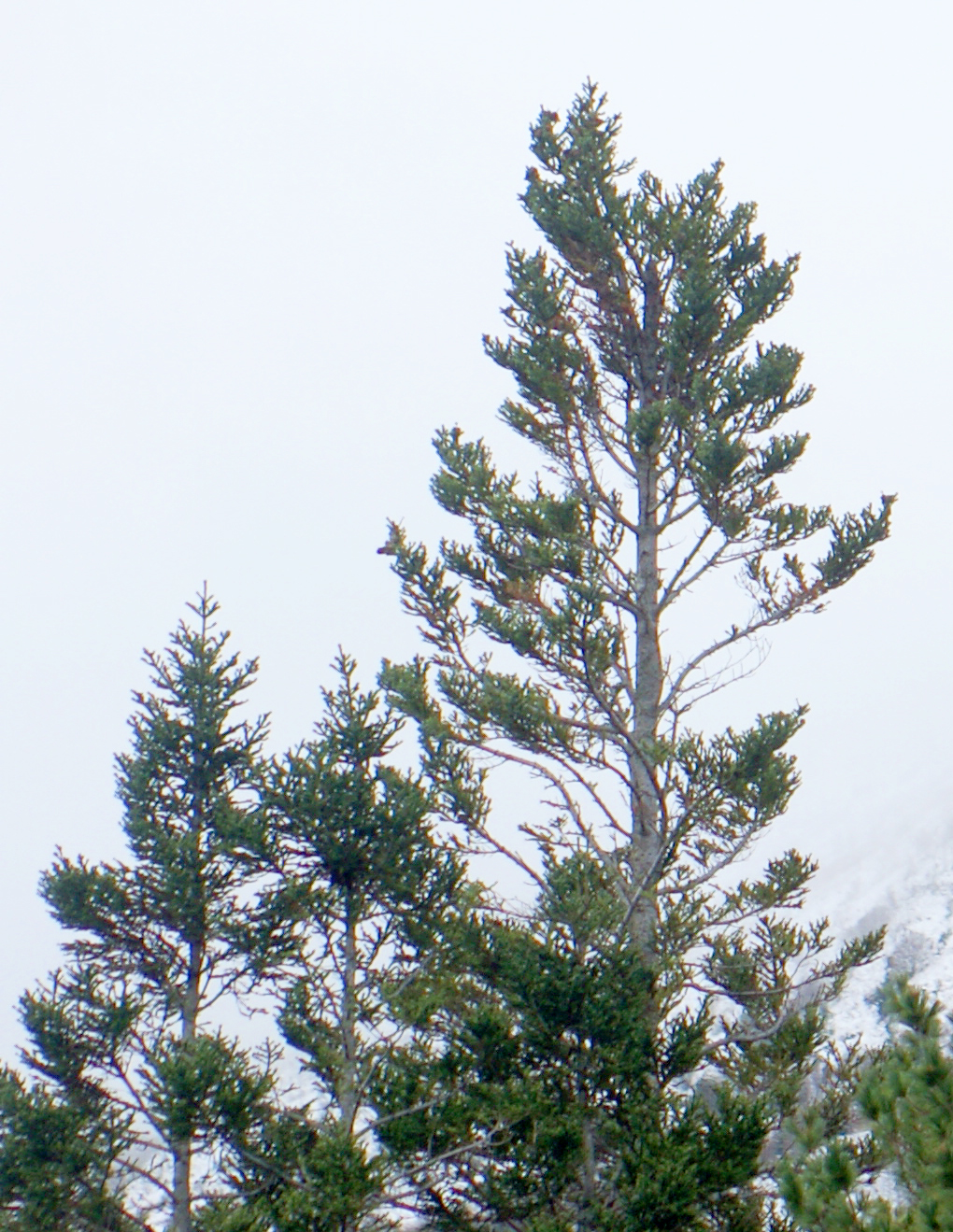

Conservation status
- Near Threatened (IUCN 3.1)

Scientific classification
- Kingdom: Plantae
- Clade: Tracheophytes
- Clade: Gymnospermae
- Division: Pinophyta
- Class: Pinopsida
- Order: Pinales
- Family: Pinaceae
- Genus: Abies
- Species: A. vejarii

Binomial name
- Abies vejarii Martínez

= Abies vejarii =

Species of conifer

Abies vejarii is a species of fir native to northeastern Mexico, in the states of Coahuila, Nuevo León, and Tamaulipas, where it grows at high elevations (2,000–3,300 m) in the Sierra Madre Oriental.

== Description ==
It is a medium-sized evergreen tree growing to 35–40 m tall. The leaves are needle-like, moderately flattened, 1–2.5 cm long and 1.3–2 mm wide by 1 mm thick, grey-green with scattered stomata above, and with two greenish-white bands of stomata below. The tip of the leaf is acutely pointed. The cones are glaucous purple, maturing grey-brown, 6–15 cm long and 4–6 cm broad, with about 150–200 scales, each scale with a bract of which the apical 3–8 mm is exserted on the closed cone, and two winged seeds; they disintegrate when mature to release the seeds.

== Range and habitat ==
Abies vejarii grows on steep mountain slopes near the summits and in cool ravines of the Sierra Madre Oriental, from 1,900 to 3,300 meters elevation. The climate is cool with wet winters and drier summers. It grows on soils typically moist but low in humus content. It is most often associated with pines and Mexican Douglas-fir (Pseudotsuga menziesii var. lindleyana), along with oaks, Cupressus arizonica, and Picea engelmannii subsp. mexicana.

== Subspecies ==
Three subspecies are recognized:

- Abies vejarii var. macrocarpa Martínez
- Abies vejarii var. mexicana (Martínez) T.S.Liu
- Abies vejarii var. vejarii

== Name ==
The species was first described in 1942. It was named after Octavio Véjar Vázquez, Mexican Minister for Public Education at the time.
