= Cuenca Alimentadora del Distrito Nacional de Riego 043 Estado de Nayarit =

Protected area in west-central Mexico

- CADNR 043 Estado de Nayarit
- IUCN category VI (protected area with sustainable use of natural resources)
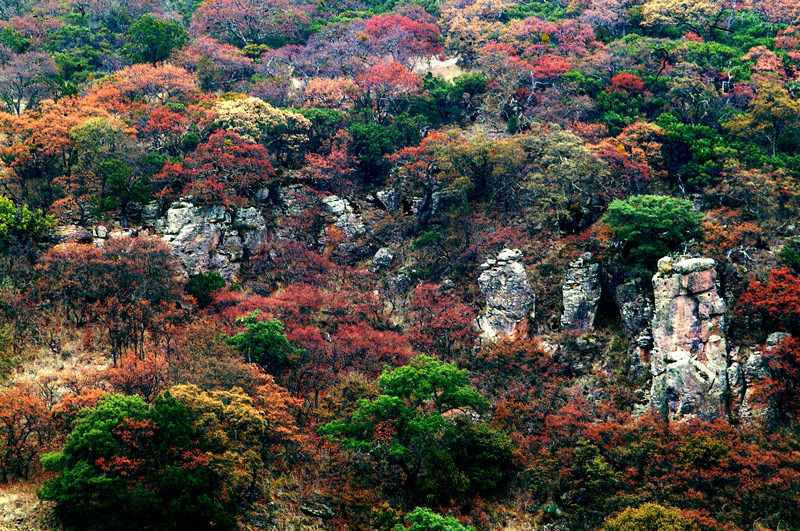
- the Sierra Fría

- Location within Mexico
- Location: Aguascalientes, Durango, Jalisco, Nayarit, and Zacatecas, Mexico
- Coordinates: 21°49′38.8″N 104°28′15.1″W
- Area: 2,329,027 ha (8,992.42 sq mi)
- Designation: Natural resources protection area
- Designated: 2002
- Administrator: National Commission of Natural Protected Areas

The Cuenca Alimentadora del Distrito Nacional de Riego 043 Estado de Nayarit is a protected natural area in west-central Mexico. It extends across portions of southern Sierra Madre Occidental and the westernmost Trans-Mexican Volcanic Belt. It has an area of 23290.27 km^{2}, covering portions of southern Durango, northern Jalisco, eastern Nayarit, southern Zacatecas, and western Aguascalientes states.

== Geography ==
The protected area consists of many isolated blocks of land, mostly atop the north–south mountain ridges of the southern Sierra Madre Occidental. It includes portions of the Sierra Pajaritos, Sierra los Huicholes, Sierra Morones, and other ranges of the Sierra Madre Occidental. The easternmost range is the Sierra Fría, between the Juchipila and Verde rivers, where it adjoins the Cuenca Alimentadora del Distrito Nacional de Riego 01 Pabellón. These ranges are separated by broad river valleys, including the valleys of the San Pedro Mezquital River and several southward-flowing tributaries of the Río Grande de Santiago, including, from west to east, the Huaynamota and Atengo, Bolaños, Juchipila, and Verde.

It also includes portions of the westernmost Trans-Mexican Volcanic Belt, to the south between the Río Grande de Santiago and Ameca rivers.

== Flora and fauna ==
The natural vegetation is pine–oak forest and woodland, with pines and/or oaks as the dominant trees, together with manzanillo (Arbutus spp.), juniper, and other plants. The forests vary with rainfall, altitude, and soils, and are home to numerous plant and animal species, including some endemic and limited-range species. Areas that have been logged are covered in thickets of manzanillo, and montane grasslands occur on canyon slopes. Dry forest extends up the river valleys from the coastal plain to the west, and matorral (dry shrubland) is found on the plateaus to the north and east.

=== Flora ===
Pinus cembroides, Pinus lumholtzii, Pinus teocote, Pinus durangensis, Pinus ayacahuite, Cupressus lusitanica, Quercus laurina, Quercus rugosa, Mammilaria senilis, Pinus engelmannii, Pinus leiophylla, Pinus chihuahuana, Juniperus deppeana, Juniperus durangensis, Quercus resinosa, Quercus potosina, Quercus eduardii, Quercus grisea, Quercus sideroxyla, Quercus chihuahuensis, Quercus aristata, Quercus uxoris, Quercus gentry, Artostaphylos pungens, Quercus microphylla, Mastichodendron capiri, Cedrela odorata, Bouteloua sp., Acacia spp., Pinus spp., Juniperus spp., Quercus spp., Tabebuia chrysantha, Handroanthus impetiginosus, Arbutus xalapensis, Amoreuxia palmatifida, Pseudotsuga menziensii var. glauca, Taxodium huegelii

=== Fauna ===
Guajolote, pavo salvaje (Meleagris gallopavo), Venado cola blanca (Odocoileus virginianus ), Pecari de collar (Pecari tajacu), Venado cola blanca (Odocoileus virginianus ), Puma (Puma concolor), Coyote (Canis latrans), Conejo castellano o serrano (Sylvilagus floridanus), Liebre cola negra (Lepus californicus), águila real (Aquila chrysaetos), Codorníz de moctezuma (Cyrtonyx montezumae), Chichimoco (Tamias bulleri), Búho moteado (Strix occidentalis), Serpiente de cascabel (Crotalus lepidus), Trogón orejón (Euptilotis neoxenus), Guacamaya verde (Ara militaris), Pato friso (Anas strepera), Cerceta ala azul, pato media luna (Anas discors), Pato cucharón norteño (Anas clypeata), Codorniz cotuí (Colinus virginianus), Paloma ala blanca (Zenaida asiatica), Paloma huilota (Zenaida macroura), Tórtola Cola Larga (Columbina inca), Tórtola Coquita (Columbina passerina), Topote del pacífico (Poecilia butleri), Murciélago negruzco, murcielaguito oscuro (Myotis nigricans), Jaguarundi, leoncillo (Puma yagouaroundi), Nutria de río (Lontra longicaudis), Jaguar (Panthera onca), Ocelote, tigrillo (Leopardus pardalis), Culebra nocturna ojo de gato (Hypsiglena torquata), Culebra ciempiés del Pacífico (Tantilla calamarina), Culebra real coralillo (Lampropeltis triangulum), Iguana negra (Ctenosaura pectinata)

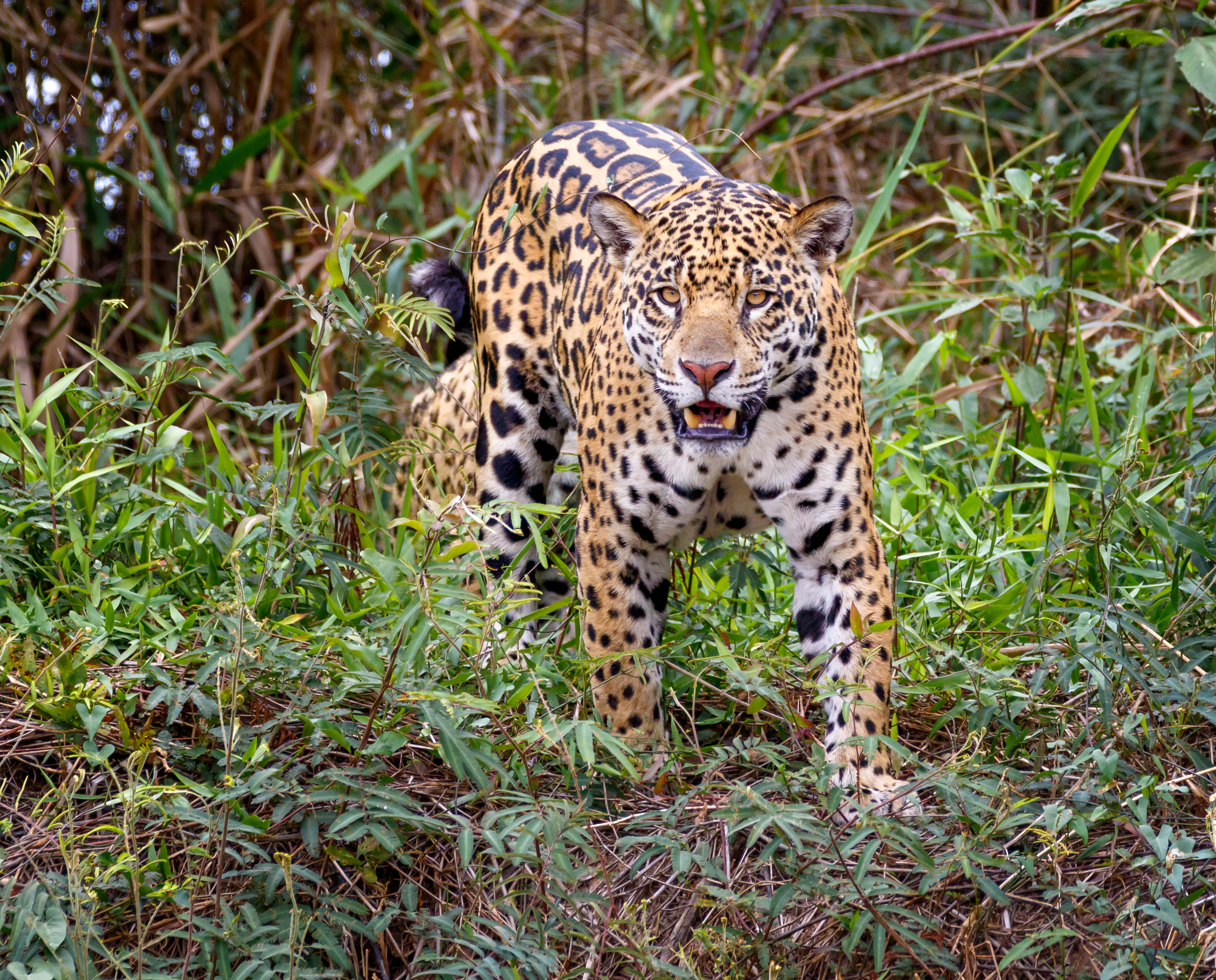
jaguar (panthera onca)

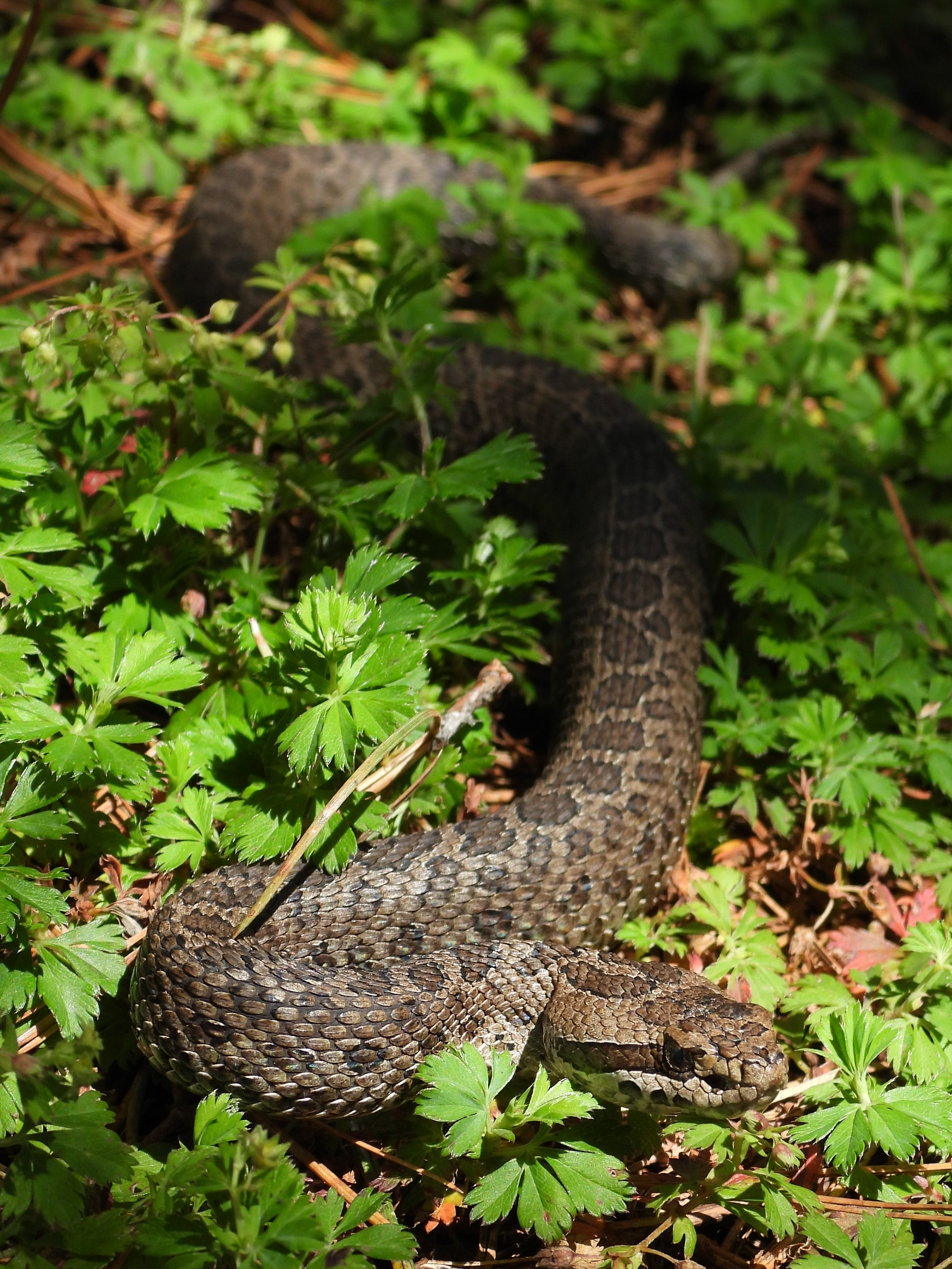
Crotalus triseriatus

== Conservation ==
The area was designated a protected forest area and watershed in August 1949. It was redesignated a Natural resources protection area in 2002.
