= Sierra de Morones =

Mountain range in west-central Mexico

- Sierra Morones
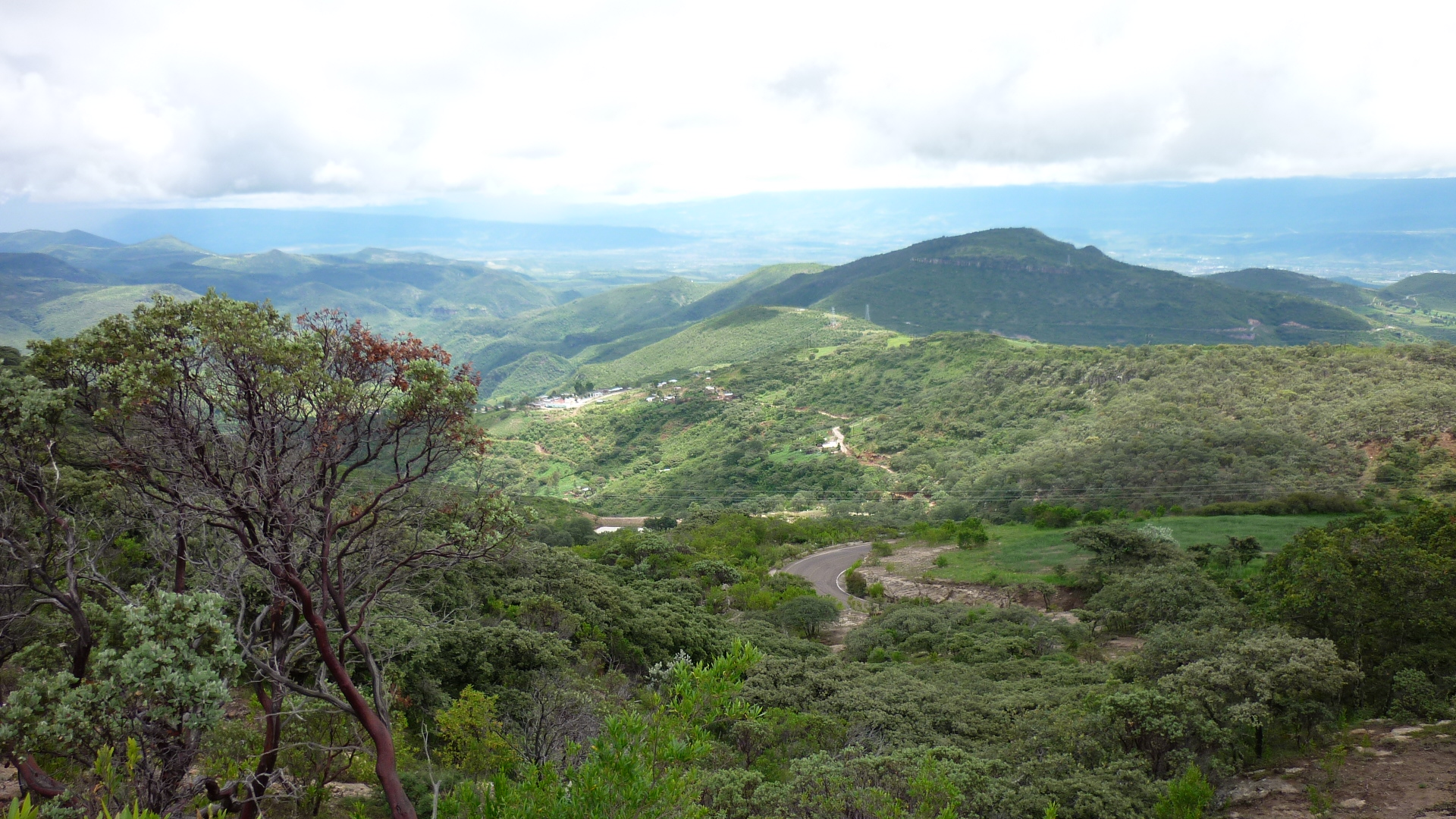

Geography
- Country: Mexico
- State: Zacatecas
- terrestrial ecoregion: Sierra Madre Occidental pine–oak forests
- Parent range: Sierra Madre Occidental

The Sierra de Morones is a mountain range in west-central Mexico.

== Geography ==
The Sierra de Morones extends north and south through the state of Zacatecas. The Sierra, together with the Sierra Fría to the east and the Sierra los Huicholes to the west, forms the southern end of the Sierra Madre Occidental.

The Juchipila River drains the eastern slopes of the Sierra, running southwards to empty into the Río Grande de Santiago. The Bolaños River, another tributary of the Río Grande de Santiago, drains the western slope of the Sierra. The Río Grande de Santiago bounds the range on the south and southeast.

== Flora and fauna ==
The Sierra de Morones is covered with pine–oak forests above 800 meters elevation. Oaks are the predominant trees, with pines becoming more common at higher elevations. Tropical dry forest occurs below 800 meters elevation.

Pinus maximartinezii is a species of pine tree found only in the Sierra de Morones, occurring between 1,600 and 2,000 meters elevation.

== Conservation ==
Part of the Sierra is in Cuenca Alimentadora del Distrito Nacional de Riego 043 Estado de Nayarit, a national natural resources protection area. It was established in 1949 to protect forests and watersheds for the benefit of downstream agriculture, and was redesignated a national resources protection area in 2002.
