= Huaynamota River =

Location
- Country: Mexico
- States: Nayarit, Durango, Jalisco, and Zacatecas

Physical characteristics
- Mouth: Río Grande de Santiago
  - coordinates: 21°51′10″N 104°43′08″W
- Basin size: 17,265 km^{2}

The Huaynamota River is a river in western Mexico. It is a tributary of the Río Grande de Santiago in the southern Sierra Madre Occidental.

== Geography ==
The Huaynamota drains a basin of 17,265 km^{2}, which covers parts of the states of Nayarit, Durango, Jalisco, and Zacatecas. The basin extends from 21° 24’ 36.82” to 23° 25’ 3.26” N and 104° 30’ 34.03” to 103° 24’ 26.73” W. The basin is mountainous, ranging in elevation from 216 to 3,148 meters.

The basin is bounded on the east by the Sierra los Huicholes, which separates it from the Bolaños River basin. The Sierra de Valparaiso bounds it on the north. The basin of the San Pedro Mezquital River bounds it on the west and northwest. The Sierra Alicia bounds it on the south.

The main tributaries of the Huaynamota are the Jesús María River, which flows from the north, and Atengo River, also known as the Chapalagana, which joins from the east. The basin of the Jesús María covers 5,185 km^{2}. The Atengo River drains a basin of 12,080 km^{2}. The Atengo's main tributaries are the Huajimic, which joins the Atengo from the south and drains the east slope of the Sierra Alicia and west slope of the Sierra Pajaritos, and the Camotlán, which drains the east slope of the Sierra Pajaritos and the southwestern Sierra los Huicholes.

The Huaynamota empties into Aguamilpa Reservoir, created by construction of the Aguamilpa Dam on the Río Grande de Santiago 25 km below its former confluence with the Huaynamota.

== Climate ==
The basin has an average annual rainfall of 600 mm, which mostly falls during the June-to-October summer wet season.

== People ==
The Huichol people live in the southeastern basin, in the valleys of the Atengo/Chapalagana and Camotlán. The Cora people live in the western basin, including the valley of the Jesús María River.

== See also ==
- List of rivers of Mexico
