= La Michilía Biosphere Reserve =

- IUCN category VI (protected area with sustainable use of natural resources)
- Location within Mexico
- Location: Durango, Mexico
- Nearest city: San Francisco del Mezquital
- Coordinates: 23°27′48.2″N 104°16′08.3″W
- Area: 35,000 ha (140 sq mi)
- Designated: 1977 & 2000
- Administrator: National Commission of Natural Protected Areas

La Michilía Biosphere Reserve is a protected area in northwestern Mexico. It is located in the Sierra Madre Occidental range in the south of the state of Durango.

== Geography ==
The reserve covers an area of 350 km^{2}. The reserve spans two ranges, the Sierra Michis and the Sierra Urica, which are part of the Sierra Madre Occidental. Between the two sierras is a landscape of hills and plateaus, threaded through by valleys and canyons. The valley of the San Pedro Mezquital River lies west of the reserve, and the Mexican Plateau to the north and east. The reserve adjoins the Cuenca Alimentadora del Distrito Nacional de Riego 043 Estado de Nayarit on the northwest and southwest.

== Ecology ==
There reserve is in the Sierra Madre Occidental pine–oak forests ecoregion. It is home to several distinct plant communities. Conifer forests prevail at higher elevation, with species of pine (Pinus), Mexican Douglas-fir (Pseudotsuga menziesii var. lindleyana), cypress (Cupressus), and juniper (Juniperus), along with pine–oak forests. Oak (Quercus spp.) forests and woodlands are found at middle elevations. Other plant communities include grasslands, dry shrubland, and wetlands. The reserve is home to 770 species of vascular plants.

Large mammals include the Coues white-tailed deer (Odocoileus virginianus mexicanus), puma (Puma concolor), and coyote (Canis latrans). The Mexican gray wolf (Canis lupus baileyii) and American black bear (Ursus americanus) had been extirpated from the reserve, but have been successfully reintroduced. There is a captive breeding facility for Mexican wolves and white tailed deer.

Native birds include the golden eagle (Aquila chrysaetos), wild turkey (Meleagris gallopavo), and thick-billed parrot (Rhynchopsitta pachyrhyncha). The imperial woodpecker (Campephilus imperialis) once inhabited the area but is now thought to be extinct.

== Conservation ==
It was designated an international biosphere reserve by UNESCO in 1977, and designated a Mexican national biosphere reserve in 2000.
