= Pajarito Mountains (Nayarit) =

Mountain range at the southern end of the Sierra Madre Occidental

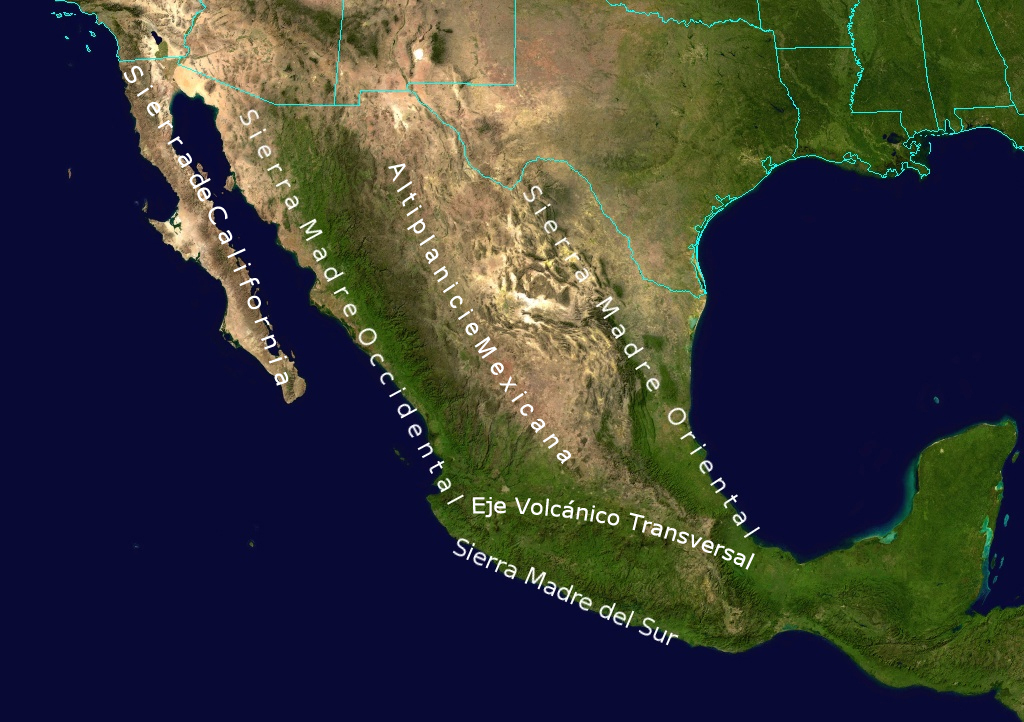

Highest point
- Elevation: 2,500 m (8,200 ft)
- Coordinates: 21°57′22″N 104°2′52″W

Naming
- Native name: Sierra Pajaritos (Spanish)

Geography
- Country: Mexico
- State: Nayarit
- Region: western Mexico
- Range coordinates: 21°44′59″N 104°15′25″W
- Parent range: Sierra Madre Occidental
- Topo map: NF13-08

Geology
- Orogeny: Laramide
- Rock type: Volcanic

The Pajarito Mountains (Sierra Pajaritos) are a small mountain range at the southern end of the Sierra Madre Occidental. They are located in the state of Nayarit in western Mexico.

== Geography ==
The Pajaritos are bounded on the west by the valley of the Huajimic, and on the east by the valley of the Camotlán River. The range consists of tilted blocks with escarpments on their western sides and more gently sloped erosional surfaces on the eastern sides. To the north the Pajaritos are bounded by the Atengo River, and to the south by a major ENE–WSW left-lateral strike-slip fault, and the Santiago River.

== Geology ==
The Pajarito Mountains consist of Cenozoic intrusive granites and granodiorites overlain by late Oligocene and Miocene (23–14 myo) volcanics mainly silicic (rhyolites grading into andesites) and followed (12–8 myo) by surface basalts (lava) and intruding basaltic dikes.
