= List of birds of the Sierra Madre Occidental =

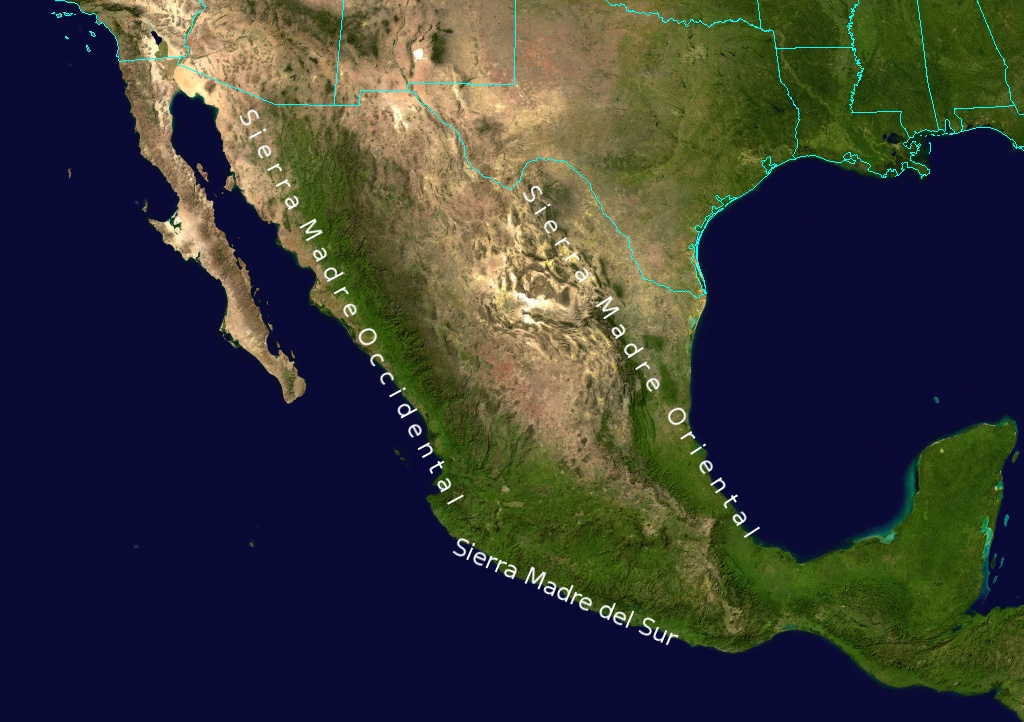
Geographical view of Mexico and its mountain ranges Sierra Madre Oriental, Sierra Madre Occidental and Sierra Madre del Sur.

This is a list of birds whose range includes, at least in part, the Sierra Madre Occidental, a mountain range in western Mexico and the extreme southwest of the United States.

The species present are as follows:

== Galloanserae (landfowl & waterfowl) ==
=== Ducks ===
Order: Anseriformes Family: Anatidae

Anatidae includes the ducks and most duck-like waterfowl, such as geese and swans. These birds are adapted to an aquatic existence with webbed feet, flattened bills, and feathers that are excellent at shedding water due to an oily coating.

- Black-bellied whistling-duck (Dendrocygna autumnalis)
- Fulvous whistling-duck (Dendrocygna bicolor)
- Snow goose (Anser caerulescens)
- Ross's goose (Anser rossii)
- Greater white-fronted goose (Anser albifrons)
- Brant (Branta bernicla)
- Cackling goose (Branta hutchinsii)
- Canada goose (Branta canadensis)
- Mute swan (Cygnus olor) introduced species
- Trumpeter swan (Cygnus buccinator)
- Tundra swan (Cygnus columbianus)
- Egyptian goose (Alopochen aegyptiaca) introduced species
- Wood duck (Aix sponsa)
- Garganey (Spatula querquedula)
- Blue-winged teal (Spatula discors)
- Cinnamon teal (Spatula cyanoptera)
- Northern shoveler (Spatula clypeata)
- Gadwall (Mareca strepera)
- Eurasian wigeon (Mareca penelope)
- American wigeon (Mareca americana)
- Mallard (Anas platyrhynchos)
- Mexican duck (Anas diazi)
- Northern pintail (Anas acuta)
- Green-winged teal (Anas crecca)
- Canvasback (Aythya valisineria)
- Redhead (Aythya americana)
- Ring-necked duck (Aythya collaris)
- Greater scaup (Aythya marila)
- Lesser scaup (Aythya affinis)
- Surf scoter (Melanitta perspicillata)
- White-winged scoter (Melanitta deglandi)
- Black scoter (Melanitta americana) near-threatened
- Long-tailed duck (Clangula hyemalis) vulnerable
- Bufflehead (Bucephala albeola)
- Common goldeneye (Bucephala clangula)
- Barrow's goldeneye (Bucephala islandica)
- Hooded merganser (Lophodytes cucullatus)
- Common merganser (Mergus merganser)
- Red-breasted merganser (Mergus serrator)
- Ruddy duck (Oxyura jamaicensis)

=== New World quails ===
Order: Galliformes Family: Odontophoridae

New World quail are small, plump terrestrial birds only distantly related to the quails of the Old World, but named for their similar appearance and habits.

- Northern bobwhite (Colinus virginianus) near-threatened
- Scaled quail (Callipepla squamata)
- California quail (Callipepla californica)
- Gambel's quail (Callipepla gambelii)
- Montezuma quail (Cyrtonyx montezumae)

=== Pheasants ===
Order: Galliformes Family: Phasianidae

Phasianidae consists of the pheasants and their allies. These are terrestrial species, variable in size but generally plump with broad relatively short wings. Many species are gamebirds or have been domesticated as a food source for humans.

- Wild turkey (Meleagris gallopavo)
- Dusky grouse (Dendragapus obscurus)
- Ring-necked pheasant (Phasianus colchicus) introduced species
- Chukar (Alectoris chukar) introduced species

== Pigeons ==
Order: Columbiformes Family: Columbidae

Pigeons and doves are stout-bodied birds with short necks and short slender bills with a fleshy cere.

- Band-tailed pigeon (Patagioenas fasciata)
- Eurasian collared-dove (Streptopelia decaocto) introduced species
- Inca dove (Columbina inca)
- Common ground dove (Columbina passerina)
- Ruddy ground dove (Columbina talpacoti)
- White-winged dove (Zenaida asiatica)
- Mourning dove (Zenaida macroura)

Order: Cuculiformes Family: Cuculidae

The family Cuculidae includes cuckoos, roadrunners, and anis. These birds are of variable size with slender bodies, long tails and strong legs.

- Groove-billed ani (Crotophaga sulcirostris)
- Greater roadrunner (Geococcyx californianus)
- Yellow-billed cuckoo (Coccyzus americanus)
- Black-billed cuckoo (Coccyzus erythropthalmus)

== Strisores (nightbirds) ==
=== Nightjars ===
Order: Caprimulgiformes Family: Caprimulgidae

Nightjars are medium-sized nocturnal birds that usually nest on the ground. They have long wings, short legs, and very short bills. Most have small feet, of little use for walking, and long pointed wings. Their soft plumage is camouflaged to resemble bark or leaves.

- Lesser nighthawk (Chordeiles acutipennis)
- Common nighthawk (Chordeiles minor)
- Common poorwill (Phalaenoptilus nuttallii)
- Buff-collared nightjar (Antrostomus ridgwayi)
- Mexican whip-poor-will (Antrostomus arizonae)

=== Swifts ===
Order: Apodiformes Family: Apodidae

Swifts are small birds which spend the majority of their lives flying. These birds have very short legs and never settle voluntarily on the ground, perching instead only on vertical surfaces. Many swifts have long swept-back wings which resemble a crescent or boomerang.

- Black swift (Cypseloides niger) vulnerable
- Chimney swift (Chaetura pelagica) vulnerable
- Vaux's swift (Chaetura vauxi)
- White-throated swift (Aeronautes saxatalis)

=== Hummingbirds ===
Order: Apodiformes Family: Trochilidae

Hummingbirds are small birds capable of hovering in mid-air due to the rapid flapping of their wings. They are the only birds that can fly backwards.

- Rivoli's hummingbird (Eugenes fulgens)
- Plain-capped starthroat (Heliomaster constantii)
- Blue-throated mountain-gem (Lampornis clemenciae)
- Lucifer hummingbird (Calothorax lucifer)
- Ruby-throated hummingbird (Archilochus colubris)
- Black-chinned hummingbird (Archilochus alexandri)
- Anna's hummingbird (Calypte anna)
- Costa's hummingbird (Calypte costae)
- Calliope hummingbird (Selasphorus calliope)
- Rufous hummingbird (Selasphorus rufus) near-threatened
- Allen's hummingbird (Selasphorus sasin) breeding endemic
- Broad-tailed hummingbird (Selasphorus platycercus)
- Broad-billed hummingbird (Cynanthus latirostris)
- White-eared hummingbird (Basilinna leucotis)
- Violet-crowned hummingbird (Ramosomyia violiceps)
- Berylline hummingbird (Saucerottia beryllina)
- Cinnamon hummingbird (Amazilia rutila)

== Gruae ==
=== Rails ===
Order: Gruiformes Family: Rallidae

Rallidae is a large family of small to medium-sized birds which includes the rails, crakes, coots, and gallinules. Typically they inhabit dense vegetation in damp environments near lakes, swamps, or rivers. In general they are shy and secretive birds, making them difficult to observe. Most species have strong legs and long toes which are well adapted to soft uneven surfaces. They tend to have short, rounded wings and to be weak fliers.

- Virginia rail (Rallus limicola)
- Sora (Porzana carolina)
- Common gallinule (Gallinula galeata)
- American coot (Fulica americana)
- Purple gallinule (Porphyrio martinica)

=== Cranes ===
Order: Gruiformes Family: Gruidae Cranes are large, long-legged and long-necked birds. Unlike the similar-looking but unrelated herons, cranes fly with necks outstretched, not pulled back. Most have elaborate and noisy courting displays or "dances".

- Sandhill crane (Antigone canadensis)
- Common crane (Grus grus) rare/accidental

=== Grebes ===
Order: Podicipediformes Family: Podicipedidae

Grebes are small to medium-sized diving birds. They breed on fresh water, but often visit the sea when migrating and in winter. They have lobed toes and are excellent swimmers and divers; however, their feet are placed far back on their bodies, making them quite ungainly on land.

- Least grebe (Tachybaptus dominicus)
- Pied-billed grebe (Podilymbus podiceps)
- Horned grebe (Podiceps auritus) vulnerable
- Red-necked grebe (Podiceps grisegena)
- Eared grebe (Podiceps nigricollis)
- Western grebe (Aechmophorus occidentalis)
- Clark's grebe (Aechmophorus clarkii)

=== Shorebirds and gulls ===
==== Stilts and avocets ====
Order: Charadriiformes Family: Recurvirostridae

Recurvirostridae is a family of large wading birds, which includes the avocets and stilts. The avocets have long legs and long up-curved bills. The stilts have extremely long legs and long, thin, straight bills.

- Black-necked stilt (Himantopus mexicanus)
- American avocet (Recurvirostra americana)

==== Lapwings and plovers ====
Order: Charadriiformes Family: Charadriidae

The family Charadriidae includes the plovers, dotterels and lapwings. They are small to medium-sized birds with compact bodies, short, thick necks and long, usually pointed, wings. They are found in open country worldwide, mostly in habitats near water.

- Black-bellied plover (Pluvialis squatarola) vulnerable
- American golden-plover (Pluvialis dominica)
- Pacific golden-plover (Pluvialis fulva)
- Killdeer (Charadrius vociferus) near-threatened
- Semipalmated plover (Charadrius semipalmatus)
- Mountain plover (Anarhynchus montanus) near-threatened
- Snowy plover (Anarhynchus nivosus) near-threatened

==== Jacanas ====
Order: Charadriiformes Family: Jacanidae

The jacanas are a group of waders found worldwide within the tropical zone. They are identifiable by their huge feet and claws which enable them to walk on floating vegetation in the shallow lakes that are their preferred habitat.

- Northern jacana (Jacana spinosa)

==== Sandpipers and allies ====
Order: Charadriiformes Family: Scolopacidae

Scolopacidae is a large diverse family of small to medium-sized shorebirds including the sandpipers, curlews, godwits, shanks, tattlers, woodcocks, snipes, dowitchers and phalaropes. The majority of these species eat small invertebrates picked out of the mud or soil. Different lengths of legs and bills enable multiple species to feed in the same habitat, particularly on the coast, without direct competition for food.

- Upland sandpiper (Bartramia longicauda)
- Hudsonian whimbrel (Numenius hudsonicus)
- Long-billed curlew (Numenius americanus)
- Hudsonian godwit (Limosa haemastica) vulnerable
- Marbled godwit (Limosa fedoa) vulnerable
- Short-billed dowitcher (Limnodromus griseus) vulnerable
- Long-billed dowitcher (Limnodromus scolopaceus) near-threatened
- American woodcock (Scolopax minor)
- Wilson's snipe (Gallinago delicata)
- Wilson's phalarope (Phalaropus tricolor)
- Red phalarope (Phalaropus fulicarius)
- Red-necked phalarope (Phalaropus lobatus)
- Spotted sandpiper (Actitis macularius)
- Solitary sandpiper (Tringa solitaria)
- Lesser yellowlegs (Tringa flavipes) vulnerable
- Willet (Tringa semipalmata)
- Greater yellowlegs (Tringa melanoleuca) near-threatened
- Ruddy turnstone (Arenaria interpres) near-threatened
- Black turnstone (Arenaria melanocephala) breeding endemic
- Red knot (Calidris canutus) near-threatened
- Ruff (Calidris pugnax)
- Sharp-tailed sandpiper (Calidris acuminata) vulnerable
- Stilt sandpiper (Calidris himantopus) near-threatened
- Sanderling (Calidris alba)
- Dunlin (Calidris alpina) near-threatened
- Baird's sandpiper (Calidris bairdii)
- White-rumped sandpiper (Calidris fuscicollis) vulnerable
- Least sandpiper (Calidris minutilla) near-threatened
- Pectoral sandpiper (Calidris melanotos)
- Western sandpiper (Calidris mauri)
- Semipalmated sandpiper (Calidris pusilla) near-threatened

==== Skuas and jaegers ====
Order: Charadriiformes Family: Stercorariidae

Skuas are in general medium to large birds, typically with gray or brown plumage, often with white markings on the wings. They have longish bills with hooked tips and webbed feet with sharp claws. They look like large dark gulls, but have a fleshy cere above the upper mandible. They are strong, acrobatic fliers.

- Long-tailed jaeger (Stercorarius longicaudus)
- Parasitic jaeger (Stercorarius parasiticus)
- Pomarine jaeger (Stercorarius pomarinus)

==== Gulls, terns, and skimmers ====
Order: Charadriiformes Family: Laridae

Laridae is a family of medium to large seabirds and includes gulls, terns, kittiwakes and skimmers. Gulls are typically gray or white, often with black markings on the head or wings. They have stout, longish bills and webbed feet. Terns are a group of generally medium to large seabirds typically with grey or white plumage, often with black markings on the head. Most terns hunt fish by diving but some pick insects off the surface of fresh water. Terns are generally long-lived birds, with several species known to live in excess of 30 years. Skimmers are a small family of tropical tern-like birds. They have an elongated lower mandible which they use to feed by flying low over the water surface and skimming the water for small fish.

- Black-legged kittiwake (Rissa tridactyla) vulnerable
- Sabine's gull (Xema sabini)
- Bonaparte's gull (Chroicocephalus philadelphia)
- Laughing gull (Leucophaeus atricilla)
- Franklin's gull (Leucophaeus pipixcan)
- Heermann's gull (Larus heermanni) near-threatened
- Short-billed gull (Larus brachyrhynchus)
- Ring-billed gull (Larus delawarensis)
- American herring gull (Larus smithsonianus)
- Glaucous gull (Larus hyperboreus)
- Lesser black-backed gull (Larus fuscus)
- California gull (Larus californicus)
- Iceland gull (Larus glaucoides)
- Black skimmer (Rynchops niger)
- Least tern (Sternula antillarum)
- Caspian tern (Hydroprogne caspia)
- Black tern (Chlidonias niger)
- Forster's tern (Sterna forsteri)
- Common tern (Sterna hirundo)
- Elegant tern (Thalasseus elegans) near-threatened

== Aequornithes (core water birds) ==
=== Loons ===
Order: Gaviiformes Family: Gaviidae

Loons are aquatic birds the size of a large duck, to which they are unrelated. Their plumage is largely gray or black, and they have spear-shaped bills. Loons swim well and fly adequately, but, because their legs are placed towards the rear of the body, are almost helpless on land.

- Red-throated loon (Gavia stellata)
- Pacific loon (Gavia pacifica)
- Common loon (Gavia immer)

=== Northern storm-petrels ===
Order: Procellariiformes Family: Hydrobatidae

Though the members of this family are similar in many respects to the southern storm-petrels, including their general appearance and habits, there are enough genetic differences to warrant their placement in a separate family.

- Wedge-rumped storm-petrel (Hydrobates tethys)
- Black storm-petrel (Hydrobates melania)
- Least storm-petrel (Hydrobates microsoma)

=== Storks ===
Order: Ciconiiformes Family: Ciconiidae

Storks are large, heavy, long-legged, long-necked wading birds with long stout bills and wide wingspans. They lack the powder down that other wading bird

- Wood stork (Mycteria americana)

=== Suliformes ===
==== Frigatebirds ====
Order: Suliformes Family: Fregatidae

Frigatebirds are large seabirds usually found over tropical oceans. They are large, black or black and white, with long wings and deeply forked tails. The males have colored inflatable throat pouches. They do not swim or walk and cannot take off from a flat surface. Having the largest wingspan-to-body-weight ratio of any bird, they are essentially aerial, able to stay aloft for more than a week.

- Magnificent frigatebird (Fregata magnificens)

==== Boobies and gannets ====
Order: Suliformes Family: Sulidae

The sulids comprise the gannets and boobies. Both groups are medium-large coastal seabirds that plunge-dive for fish.

- Blue-footed booby (Sula nebouxii) rare/accidental

==== Cormorants and shags ====
Order: Suliformes Family: Phalacrocoracidae

Cormorants are medium-to-large aquatic birds, usually with mainly dark plumage and areas of colored skin on the face. The bill is long, thin and sharply hooked. Their feet are four-toed and webbed.

- Double-crested cormorant (Nannopterum auritum)
- Neotropic cormorant (Nannopterum brasilianum)

=== Pelicaniforms ===
==== Ibises and spoonbills ====
Order: Pelecaniformes Family: Threskiornithidae

Members of this family have long, broad wings, are strong fliers and, rather surprisingly, given their size and weight, very capable soarers. The body tends to be elongated, the neck more so, with rather long legs. The bill is also long, decurved in the case of the ibises, straight and distinctively flattened in the spoonbills.

- White ibis (Eudocimus albus)
- Glossy ibis (Plegadis falcinellus)
- White-faced ibis (Plegadis chihi)
- Roseate spoonbill (Platalea ajaja)

==== Herons, egrets, and bitterns ====
Order: Pelecaniformes Family: Ardeidae

The family Ardeidae contains the herons, egrets and bitterns. Herons and egrets are medium to large wading birds with long necks and legs. Bitterns tend to be shorter necked and more secretive. Members of Ardeidae fly with their necks retracted, unlike other long-necked birds such as storks, ibises and spoonbills.

- American bittern (Botaurus lentiginosus)
- Least bittern (Botaurus exilis)
- Yellow-crowned night heron (Nyctanassa violacea)
- Black-crowned night heron (Nycticorax nycticorax)
- Little blue heron (Egretta caerulea)
- Tricolored heron (Egretta tricolor)
- Reddish egret (Egretta rufescens) near-threatened
- Snowy egret (Egretta thula)
- Green heron (Butorides virescens)
- Western cattle-egret (Ardea ibis)
- Great egret (Ardea alba)
- Great blue heron (Ardea herodias)

==== Pelicans ====
Order: Pelecaniformes Family: Pelecanidae

Pelicans are very large water birds with a distinctive pouch under their beak. Like other birds in the order Pelecaniformes, they have four webbed toes.

- American white pelican (Pelecanus erythrorhynchos)
- Brown pelican (Pelecanus occidentalis)

== Accipitriformes ==
=== New World vultures ===
Order: Cathartiformes Family: Cathartidae

The New World vultures are not closely related to Old World vultures, but superficially resemble them because of convergent evolution. Like the Old World vultures, they are scavengers. However, unlike Old World vultures, which find carcasses by sight, New World vultures have a good sense of smell with which they locate carcasses.

- California condor (Gymnogyps californianus) critically endangered
- Black vulture (Coragyps atratus)
- Turkey vulture (Cathartes aura)

=== Osprey ===
Order: Accipitriformes Family: Pandionidae

Pandionidae is a family of fish-eating birds of prey, possessing a very large, powerful hooked beak for tearing flesh from their prey, strong legs, powerful talons and keen eyesight. The family is monotypic.

- Osprey (Pandion haliaetus)

=== Hawks, eagles, and kites ===
Order: Accipitriformes Family: Accipitridae

Accipitridae is a family of birds of prey, which includes hawks, eagles, kites, harriers and Old World vultures. These birds have very large powerful hooked beaks for tearing flesh from their prey, strong legs, powerful talons and keen eyesight.

- White-tailed kite (Elanus leucurus)
- Golden eagle (Aquila chrysaetos)
- Sharp-shinned hawk (Accipiter striatus)
- Cooper's hawk (Astur cooperii)
- American goshawk (Astur atricapillus)
- Northern harrier (Circus hudsonius)
- Bald eagle (Haliaeetus leucocephalus)
- Mississippi kite (Ictinia mississippiensis) breeding endemic
- Common black hawk (Buteogallus anthracinus)
- Harris's hawk (Parabuteo unicinctus)
- Gray hawk (Buteo plagiatus)
- Broad-winged hawk (Buteo platypterus)
- Red-shouldered hawk (Buteo lineatus)
- Zone-tailed hawk (Buteo albonotatus)
- Short-tailed hawk (Buteo brachyurus)
- Swainson's hawk (Buteo swainsoni)
- Red-tailed hawk (Buteo jamaicensis)
- Rough-legged hawk (Buteo lagopus)
- Ferruginous hawk (Buteo regalis)

== Owls ==
=== Barn owls ===
Order: Strigiformes Family: Tytonidae

Barn owls are medium to large owls with large heads and characteristic heart-shaped faces. They have long strong legs with powerful talons.

- American barn owl (Tyto furcata)

=== True owls ===
Order: Strigiformes Family: Strigidae

Typical owls are small to large solitary nocturnal birds of prey. They have large forward-facing eyes and ears, a hawk-like beak and a conspicuous circle of feathers around each eye called a facial disk.

- Flammulated owl (Psiloscops flammeolus)
- Whiskered screech-owl (Megascops trichopsis)
- Western screech-owl (Megascops kennicottii)
- Great horned owl (Bubo virginianus)
- Northern pygmy-owl (Glaucidium gnoma)
- Ferruginous pygmy-owl (Glaucidium brasilianum)
- Elf owl (Micrathene whitneyi)
- Burrowing owl (Athene cunicularia)
- Spotted owl (Strix occidentalis) near-threatened
- Long-eared owl (Asio otus)
- Short-eared owl (Asio flammeus)
- Northern saw-whet owl (Aegolius acadicus)

== Cavitaves ==
=== Trogons ===
Order: Trogoniformes Family: Trogonidae

Trogons are residents of tropical forests worldwide and have soft, often colorful, feathers with distinctive male and female plumage. They have compact bodies with long tails and short necks.

- Eared quetzal (Euptilotis neoxenus) rare/accidental
- Coppery-tailed trogon (Trogon ambiguus)

=== Kingfishers ===
Order: Coraciiformes Family: Alcedinidae

Kingfishers are medium-sized birds with large heads, long pointed bills, short legs and stubby tails.

- Ringed kingfisher (Megaceryle torquata)
- Belted kingfisher (Megaceryle alcyon)
- Green kingfisher (Chloroceryle americana)

=== Woodpeckers ===
Order: Piciformes Family: Picidae

Woodpeckers are small to medium-sized birds with chisel-like beaks, short legs, stiff tails and long tongues used for capturing insects. Some species have feet with two toes pointing forward and two backward, while several species have only three toes. Many woodpeckers have the habit of tapping noisily on tree trunks with their beaks.

- Williamson's sapsucker (Sphyrapicus thyroideus)
- Yellow-bellied sapsucker (Sphyrapicus varius)
- Red-naped sapsucker (Sphyrapicus nuchalis)
- Red-breasted sapsucker (Sphyrapicus ruber)
- Lewis's woodpecker (Melanerpes lewis)
- Red-headed woodpecker (Melanerpes erythrocephalus)
- Acorn woodpecker (Melanerpes formicivorus)
- Gila woodpecker (Melanerpes uropygialis)
- American three-toed woodpecker (Picoides dorsalis)
- Downy woodpecker (Dryobates pubescens)
- Ladder-backed woodpecker (Dryobates scalaris)
- Hairy woodpecker (Leuconotopicus villosus)
- Arizona woodpecker (Leuconotopicus arizonae)
- Northern flicker (Colaptes auratus)
- Gilded flicker (Colaptes chrysoides)

== Falcons and caracaras ==
Order: Falconiformes Family: Falconidae

Falconidae is a family of diurnal birds of prey, notably the falcons and caracaras. They differ from hawks, eagles and kites in that they kill with their beaks instead of their talons.

- Crested caracara (Caracara plancus)
- American kestrel (Falco sparverius)
- Merlin (Falco columbarius)
- Aplomado falcon (Falco femoralis)
- Peregrine falcon (Falco peregrinus)
- Prairie falcon (Falco mexicanus)

== Parrots ==
=== Old World parrots ===
Order: Psittaciformes Family: Psittaculidae

Characteristic features of parrots include a strong curved bill, an upright stance, strong legs, and clawed zygodactyl feet. Many parrots are vividly colored, and some are multi-colored. In size they range from 8 cm (3.1 in) to 1 m (3.3 ft) in length. Old World parrots are found from Africa east across south and southeast Asia and Oceania to Australia and New Zealand.

- Rosy-faced lovebird (Agapornis roseicollis) introduced species

=== African and New World parrots ===
- Order: Psittaciformes Family: Psittacidae

Parrots are small to large birds with a characteristic curved beak. Their upper mandibles have slight mobility in the joint with the skull and they have a generally erect stance. All parrots are zygodactyl, having the four toes on each foot placed two at the front and two to the back.

- Monk parakeet (Myiopsitta monachus) introduced species
- Thick-billed parrot (Rhynchopsitta pachyrhyncha) rare/accidental endangered

== Passerines ==
=== Tyranni ===
==== Tityras and allies ====
Order: Passeriformes Family: Tityridae

Tityridae are suboscine passerine birds found in forest and woodland in the Neotropics. The species in this family were formerly spread over the families Tyrannidae, Pipridae, and Cotingidae. They are small to medium-sized birds. They do not have the sophisticated vocal capabilities of the songbirds. Most, but not all, have plain coloring.

- Gray-collared becard (Pachyramphus major) rare/accidental
- Rose-throated becard (Pachyramphus aglaiae)

==== Tityras and allies ====
Order: Passeriformes Family: Tityridae

Tityridae are suboscine passerine birds found in forest and woodland in the Neotropics. The species in this family were formerly spread over the families Tyrannidae, Pipridae, and Cotingidae. They are small to medium-sized birds. They do not have the sophisticated vocal capabilities of the songbirds. Most, but not all, have plain coloring.

- Northern beardless-tyrannulet (Camptostoma imberbe)
- Tufted flycatcher (Mitrephanes phaeocercus) rare/accidental
- Olive-sided flycatcher (Contopus cooperi)
- Greater pewee (Contopus pertinax)
- Western wood-pewee (Contopus sordidulus)
- Eastern wood-pewee (Contopus virens)
- Yellow-bellied flycatcher (Empidonax flaviventris)
- Willow flycatcher (Empidonax traillii)
- Least flycatcher (Empidonax minimus)
- Hammond's flycatcher (Empidonax hammondii)
- Gray flycatcher (Empidonax wrightii) breeding endemic
- Dusky flycatcher (Empidonax oberholseri)
- Pine flycatcher (Empidonax affinis) rare/accidental
- Western flycatcher (Empidonax difficilis)
- Buff-breasted flycatcher (Empidonax fulvifrons)
- Black phoebe (Sayornis nigricans)
- Eastern phoebe (Sayornis phoebe)
- Say's phoebe (Sayornis saya)
- Vermilion flycatcher (Pyrocephalus rubinus)
- Dusky-capped flycatcher (Myiarchus tuberculifer)
- Ash-throated flycatcher (Myiarchus cinerascens)
- Nutting's flycatcher (Myiarchus nuttingi)
- Brown-crested flycatcher (Myiarchus tyrannulus)
- Sulphur-bellied flycatcher (Myiodynastes luteiventris)
- Tropical kingbird (Tyrannus melancholicus)
- Couch's kingbird (Tyrannus couchii)
- Cassin's kingbird (Tyrannus vociferans)
- Thick-billed kingbird (Tyrannus crassirostris)
- Western kingbird (Tyrannus verticalis)
- Eastern kingbird (Tyrannus tyrannus)
- Scissor-tailed flycatcher (Tyrannus forficatus)

=== Corvides ===
==== Vireos, shrike-babblers, and erpornis ====
Order: Passeriformes Family: Vireonidae

The vireos are a group of small to medium-sized passerine birds. They are typically greenish in color and resemble wood warblers apart from their heavier bills.

- White-eyed vireo (Vireo griseus)
- Bell's vireo (Vireo bellii)
- Gray vireo (Vireo vicinior)
- Hutton's vireo (Vireo huttoni)
- Yellow-throated vireo (Vireo flavifrons)
- Cassin's vireo (Vireo cassinii)
- Blue-headed vireo (Vireo solitarius)
- Plumbeous vireo (Vireo plumbeus)
- Philadelphia vireo (Vireo philadelphicus)
- Eastern warbling vireo (Vireo gilvus)
- Western warbling vireo (Vireo swainsoni)
- Red-eyed vireo (Vireo olivaceus)
- Yellow-green vireo (Vireo flavoviridis)

==== Shrikes ====
Order: Passeriformes Family: Laniidae

Shrikes are passerine birds known for their habit of catching other birds and small animals and impaling the uneaten portions of their bodies on thorns. A shrike's beak is hooked, like that of a typical bird of prey.

- Loggerhead shrike (Lanius ludovicianus) near-threatened
- Northern shrike (Lanius borealis)

==== Crows, jays, and magpies ====
Order: Passeriformes Family: Corvidae

The family Corvidae includes crows, ravens, jays, choughs, magpies, treepies, nutcrackers and ground jays. Corvids are above average in size among the Passeriformes, and some of the larger species show high levels of intelligence.

- Canada jay (Perisoreus canadensis)
- Pinyon jay (Gymnorhinus cyanocephalus) vulnerable
- Steller's jay (Cyanocitta stelleri)
- Blue jay (Cyanocitta cristata)
- Woodhouse's scrub-jay (Aphelocoma woodhouseii)
- Mexican jay (Aphelocoma wollweberi)
- Clark's nutcracker (Nucifraga columbiana)
- American crow (Corvus brachyrhynchos)
- Chihuahuan raven (Corvus cryptoleucus)
- Common raven (Corvus corax)

=== Passerides ===
==== Tits, chickadees, and titmice ====
Order: Passeriformes Family: Paridae

The Paridae are mainly small stocky woodland species with short stout bills. Some have crests. They are adaptable birds, with a mixed diet including seeds and insects.

- Mountain chickadee (Poecile gambeli)
- Mexican chickadee (Poecile sclateri)
- Bridled titmouse (Baeolophus wollweberi)
- Juniper titmouse (Baeolophus ridgwayi)

==== Penduline-tits ====
Order: Passeriformes Family: Remizidae

The penduline-tits are a family of small passerine birds, related to the true tits. The verdin is the only North American representative of its family.

- Verdin (Auriparus flaviceps)

==== Larks ====
Order: Passeriformes Family: Alaudidae

Larks are small terrestrial birds with often extravagant songs and display flights. Most larks are fairly dull in appearance. Their food is insects and seeds.

- Horned lark (Eremophila alpestris)

==== Swallows ====
Order: Passeriformes Family: Hirundinidae

The family Hirundinidae is adapted to aerial feeding. They have a slender streamlined body, long pointed wings and a short bill with a wide gape. The feet are adapted to perching rather than walking, and the front toes are partially joined at the base.

- Bank swallow (Riparia riparia)
- Tree swallow (Tachycineta bicolor)
- Violet-green swallow (Tachycineta thalassina)
- Purple martin (Progne subis)
- Brown-chested martin (Progne tapera)
- Northern rough-winged swallow (Stelgidopteryx serripennis)
- Barn swallow (Hirundo rustica)
- Cliff swallow (Petrochelidon pyrrhonota)
- Cave swallow (Petrochelidon fulva)

==== Swallows ====
Order: Passeriformes Family: Hirundinidae

The family Hirundinidae is adapted to aerial feeding. They have a slender streamlined body, long pointed wings and a short bill with a wide gape. The feet are adapted to perching rather than walking, and the front toes are partially joined at the base.

- Bushtit (Psaltriparus minimus)

=== Muscicapida ===
==== Kinglets ====
Order: Passeriformes Family: Regulidae

The kinglets are a small family of birds which resemble the titmice. They are very small insectivorous birds in the genus Regulus. The adults have colored crowns, giving rise to their name.

- Ruby-crowned kinglet (Corthylio calendula)
- Golden-crowned kinglet (Regulus satrapa)

==== Nuthatches ====
Order: Passeriformes Family: Sittidae

Nuthatches are small woodland birds. They have the unusual ability to climb down trees head first, unlike other birds which can only go upwards. Nuthatches have big heads, short tails and powerful bills and feet.

- White-breasted nuthatch (Sitta carolinensis)
- Pygmy nuthatch (Sitta pygmaea)
- Red-breasted nuthatch (Sitta canadensis)

==== Treecreepers ====
Order: Passeriformes Family: Certhiidae

Treecreepers are small woodland birds, brown above and white below. They have thin pointed down-curved bills, which they use to extricate insects from bark. They have stiff tail feathers, like woodpeckers, which they use to support themselves on vertical trees.

- Brown creeper (Certhia americana)

==== Gnatcatchers ====
Order: Passeriformes Family: Polioptilidae

These dainty birds resemble Old World warblers in their build and habits, moving restlessly through the foliage seeking insects. The gnatcatchers and gnatwrens are mainly soft bluish gray in color and have the typical insectivore's long sharp bill. They are birds of fairly open woodland or scrub, which nest in bushes or trees.

- Blue-gray gnatcatcher (Polioptila caerulea)
- Black-tailed gnatcatcher (Polioptila melanura)
- Black-capped gnatcatcher (Polioptila nigriceps)

==== Wrens ====
Order: Passeriformes Family: Troglodytidae

Wrens are small and inconspicuous birds, except for their loud songs. They have short wings and thin down-turned bills. Several species often hold their tails upright. All are insectivorous.

- Rock wren (Salpinctes obsoletus)
- Canyon wren (Catherpes mexicanus)
- Northern house wren (Troglodytes aedon)
- Pacific wren (Troglodytes pacificus)
- Winter wren (Troglodytes hiemalis)
- Sedge wren (Cistothorus stellaris)
- Marsh wren (Cistothorus palustris)
- Carolina wren (Thryothorus ludovicianus)
- Bewick's wren (Thryomanes bewickii)
- Cactus wren (Campylorhynchus brunneicapillus)
- Sinaloa wren (Thryophilus sinaloa) rare/accidental

==== Dippers ====
Order: Passeriformes Family: Cinclidae

They are named for their bobbing or dipping movements. They are unique among passerines for their ability to dive and swim underwater.

- American dipper (Cinclus mexicanus)

==== Starlings ====
Order: Passeriformes Family: Sturnidae

Starlings and mynas are small to medium-sized Old World passerine birds with strong feet. Their flight is strong and direct and most are very gregarious. Their preferred habitat is fairly open country, and they eat insects and fruit. The plumage of several species is dark with a metallic sheen.

- European starling (Sturnus vulgaris) introduced species

==== Mockingbirds and thrashers ====
Order: Passeriformes Family: Mimidae

The mimids are a family of passerine birds which includes thrashers, mockingbirds, tremblers and the New World catbirds. These birds are notable for their vocalization, especially their remarkable ability to mimic a wide variety of birds and other sounds heard outdoors. The species tend towards dull grays and browns in their appearance.

- Blue mockingbird (Melanotis caerulescens) rare/accidental
- Gray catbird (Dumetella carolinensis)
- Curve-billed thrasher (Toxostoma curvirostre)
- Brown thrasher (Toxostoma rufum)
- Bendire's thrasher (Toxostoma bendirei) vulnerable
- Crissal thrasher (Toxostoma crissale)
- Sage thrasher (Oreoscoptes montanus)
- Northern mockingbird (Mimus polyglottos)

==== Thrushes and allies ====
Order: Passeriformes Family: Turdidae

The thrushes are a group of passerine birds that occur mainly but not exclusively in the Old World. They are plump, soft plumaged, small to medium-sized insectivores or sometimes omnivores, often feeding on the ground. Many have attractive songs.

- Eastern bluebird (Sialia sialis)
- Western bluebird (Sialia mexicana)
- Mountain bluebird (Sialia currucoides)
- Townsend's solitaire (Myadestes townsendi)
- Brown-backed solitaire (Myadestes occidentalis) rare/accidental
- Varied thrush (Ixoreus naevius)
- Veery (Catharus fuscescens)
- Swainson's thrush (Catharus ustulatus)
- Hermit thrush (Catharus guttatus)
- Wood thrush (Hylocichla mustelina)
- Aztec thrush (Ridgwayia pinicola) rare/accidental
- American robin (Turdus migratorius)
- Rufous-backed robin (Turdus rufopalliatus) rare/accidental
- White-throated thrush (Turdus assimilis)
- Clay-colored thrush (Turdus grayi)

==== Waxwings ====
Order: Passeriformes Family: Bombycillidae

The waxwings are a group of birds with soft silky plumage and unique red tips to some of the wing feathers. In the Bohemian and cedar waxwings, these tips look like sealing wax and give the group its name. These are arboreal birds of northern forests. They live on insects in summer and berries in winter.

- Bohemian waxwing (Bombycilla garrulus)
- Cedar waxwing (Bombycilla cedrorum)

==== Silky-flycatchers ====
Order: Passeriformes Family: Ptiliogonatidae

The silky-flycatchers are a small family of passerine birds which occur mainly in Central America. They are related to waxwings, and like that group, have soft silky plumage, usually gray or pale-yellow.

- Phainopepla (Phainopepla nitens)

=== Passerida ===
==== Olive warbler ====
Order: Passeriformes Family: Peucedramidae

The olive warbler is the only representative of its family. It was formally classified with the Parulidae, but DNA studies warrant its classification in a distinct family.

- Olive warbler (Peucedramus taeniatus)

==== Waxbills and allies ====
Order: Passeriformes Family: Estrildidae

The estrildid finches are small passerine birds native to the Old World tropics. They are gregarious and often colonial seed eaters with short thick but pointed bills. They are all similar in structure and habits, but have wide variation in plumage colors and patterns.

- Scaly-breasted munia (Lonchura punctulata) introduced species

==== Old World sparrows ====
Order: Passeriformes Family: Passeridae

Old World sparrows are small passerine birds. In general, sparrows tend to be small plump brownish or grayish birds with short tails and short powerful beaks. Sparrows are seed eaters, but they also consume small insects.

- House sparrow (Passer domesticus) introduced species

==== Wagtails and pipits ====
Order: Passeriformes Family: Motacillidae

Motacillidae is a family of small passerine birds with medium to long tails. They include the wagtails, longclaws and pipits. They are slender, ground feeding insectivores of open country.

- American pipit (Anthus rubescens)
- Sprague's pipit (Anthus spragueii) vulnerable

==== Finches, euphonias, and allies ====
Order: Passeriformes Family: Fringillidae

Finches are seed-eating passerine birds, that are small to moderately large and have a strong beak, usually conical and in some species very large. All have twelve tail feathers and nine primaries. These birds have a bouncing flight with alternating bouts of flapping and gliding on closed wings, and most sing well.

- Evening grosbeak (Hesperiphona vespertina) vulnerable
- Pine grosbeak (Pinicola enucleator)
- Black rosy-finch (Leucosticte atrata) endemic (country/region) endangered
- House finch (Haemorhous mexicanus)
- Purple finch (Haemorhous purpureus)
- Cassin's finch (Haemorhous cassinii)
- Red crossbill (Loxia curvirostra)
- Pine siskin (Spinus pinus)
- Lesser goldfinch (Spinus psaltria)
- Lawrence's goldfinch (Spinus lawrencei)
- American goldfinch (Spinus tristis)

==== Longspurs and snow buntings ====
Order: Passeriformes Family: Calcariidae

The Calcariidae are a group of passerine birds that have been traditionally grouped with the Emberizeridae (New World sparrows), but differ in a number of respects and are usually found in open grassy areas.

- Lapland longspur (Calcarius lapponicus)
- Chestnut-collared longspur (Calcarius ornatus) vulnerable
- Thick-billed longspur (Rhynchophanes mccownii)
- Snow bunting (Plectrophenax nivalis)

==== Old World buntings ====
Order: Passeriformes Family: Emberizidae

Emberizidae is a family of passerine birds containing a single genus. Until 2017, the New World sparrows (Passerellidae) were also considered part of this family.

- Little bunting (Emberiza pusilla) rare/accidental

==== New World sparrows ====
Order: Passeriformes Family: Passerellidae

Until 2017, these species were considered part of the family Emberizidae. Most of the species are known as sparrows, but these birds are not closely related to the Old World sparrows which are in the family Passeridae. Many of these have distinctive head patterns.

- Rufous-winged sparrow (Peucaea carpalis)
- Botteri's sparrow (Peucaea botterii)
- Cassin's sparrow (Peucaea cassinii)
- Grasshopper sparrow (Ammodramus savannarum)
- Chipping sparrow (Spizella passerina)
- Clay-colored sparrow (Spizella pallida)
- Black-chinned sparrow (Spizella atrogularis)
- Field sparrow (Spizella pusilla)
- Brewer's sparrow (Spizella breweri)
- Five-striped sparrow (Amphispizopsis quinquestriata)
- Black-throated sparrow (Amphispiza bilineata)
- Lark sparrow (Chondestes grammacus)
- Lark bunting (Calamospiza melanocorys)
- American tree sparrow (Spizelloides arborea)
- Fox sparrow (Passerella iliaca)
- Dark-eyed junco (Junco hyemalis)
- Yellow-eyed junco (Junco phaeonotus)
- White-crowned sparrow (Zonotrichia leucophrys)
- Golden-crowned sparrow (Zonotrichia atricapilla)
- Harris's sparrow (Zonotrichia querula) near-threatened
- White-throated sparrow (Zonotrichia albicollis)
- Sagebrush sparrow (Artemisiospiza nevadensis) endemic (country/region)
- Vesper sparrow (Pooecetes gramineus)
- Savannah sparrow (Passerculus sandwichensis)
- Baird's sparrow (Centronyx bairdii)
- Song sparrow (Melospiza melodia)
- Lincoln's sparrow (Melospiza lincolnii)
- Swamp sparrow (Melospiza georgiana)
- Canyon towhee (Melozone fusca)
- Abert's towhee (Melozone aberti)
- Rufous-crowned sparrow (Aimophila ruficeps)
- Green-tailed towhee (Pipilo chlorurus) breeding endemic
- Spotted towhee (Pipilo maculatus)
- Eastern towhee (Pipilo erythrophthalmus)

==== Yellow-breasted chat ====
Order: Passeriformes Family: Icteriidae

This species was historically placed in the wood-warblers but nonetheless most authorities were unsure if it belonged there. It was placed in its own family in 2017.

- Yellow-breasted chat (Icteria virens)

==== Troupials and allies ====
Order: Passeriformes Family: Icteridae

The icterids are a group of small to medium-sized, often colorful passerine birds restricted to the New World and include the grackles, New World blackbirds and New World orioles. Most species have black as a predominant plumage color, often enlivened by yellow, orange or red.

- Yellow-headed blackbird (Xanthocephalus xanthocephalus)
- Bobolink (Dolichonyx oryzivorus) near-threatened
- Western meadowlark (Sturnella neglecta)
- Chihuahuan meadowlark (Sturnella lilianae)
- Black-vented oriole (Icterus wagleri) rare/accidental
- Orchard oriole (Icterus spurius)
- Hooded oriole (Icterus cucullatus)
- Streak-backed oriole (Icterus pustulatus)
- Bullock's oriole (Icterus bullockii)
- Baltimore oriole (Icterus galbula)
- Scott's oriole (Icterus parisorum)
- Red-winged blackbird (Agelaius phoeniceus)
- Bronzed cowbird (Molothrus aeneus)
- Brown-headed cowbird (Molothrus ater)
- Rusty blackbird (Euphagus carolinus) vulnerable
- Brewer's blackbird (Euphagus cyanocephalus) near-threatened
- Common grackle (Quiscalus quiscula) near-threatened
- Great-tailed grackle (Quiscalus mexicanus)

==== New World warblers ====
Order: Passeriformes Family: Parulidae

The wood warblers are a group of small often colorful passerine birds restricted to the New World. Most are arboreal, but some are more terrestrial. Most members of this family are insectivores.

- Ovenbird (Seiurus aurocapilla)
- Worm-eating warbler (Helmitheros vermivorum)
- Louisiana waterthrush (Parkesia motacilla)
- Northern waterthrush (Parkesia noveboracensis)
- Golden-winged warbler (Vermivora chrysoptera) near-threatened
- Blue-winged warbler (Vermivora cyanoptera)
- Black-and-white warbler (Mniotilta varia)
- Prothonotary warbler (Protonotaria citrea)
- Swainson's warbler (Limnothlypis swainsonii) breeding endemic
- Crescent-chested warbler (Oreothlypis superciliosa)
- Tennessee warbler (Leiothlypis peregrina)
- Orange-crowned warbler (Leiothlypis celata)
- Lucy's warbler (Leiothlypis luciae)
- Nashville warbler (Leiothlypis ruficapilla)
- Virginia's warbler (Leiothlypis virginiae) breeding endemic
- MacGillivray's warbler (Geothlypis tolmiei)
- Mourning warbler (Geothlypis philadelphia)
- Kentucky warbler (Geothlypis formosa) breeding endemic
- Common yellowthroat (Geothlypis trichas)
- Hooded warbler (Setophaga citrina)
- American redstart (Setophaga ruticilla)
- Cape May warbler (Setophaga tigrina)
- Cerulean warbler (Setophaga cerulea) near-threatened
- Northern parula (Setophaga americana)
- Tropical parula (Setophaga pitiayumi)
- Magnolia warbler (Setophaga magnolia)
- Bay-breasted warbler (Setophaga castanea)
- Blackburnian warbler (Setophaga fusca)
- Northern yellow warbler (Setophaga aestiva)
- Chestnut-sided warbler (Setophaga pensylvanica)
- Blackpoll warbler (Setophaga striata) near-threatened
- Black-throated blue warbler (Setophaga caerulescens)
- Palm warbler (Setophaga palmarum)
- Pine warbler (Setophaga pinus)
- Yellow-rumped warbler (Setophaga coronata)
- Yellow-throated warbler (Setophaga dominica)
- Prairie warbler (Setophaga discolor)
- Grace's warbler (Setophaga graciae)
- Black-throated gray warbler (Setophaga nigrescens)
- Townsend's warbler (Setophaga townsendi)
- Hermit warbler (Setophaga occidentalis) breeding endemic
- Black-throated green warbler (Setophaga virens)
- Fan-tailed warbler (Euthlypis lachrymosa)
- Rufous-capped warbler (Basileuterus rufifrons)
- Canada warbler (Cardellina canadensis)
- Wilson's warbler (Cardellina pusilla)
- Red-faced warbler (Cardellina rubrifrons)
- Painted redstart (Myioborus pictus)
- Slate-throated redstart (Myioborus miniatus)

==== Cardinals and allies ====
Order: Passeriformes Family: Cardinalidae

The cardinals are a family of robust, seed-eating birds with strong bills. They are typically associated with open woodland. The sexes usually have distinct plumages.

- Hepatic tanager (Piranga flava)
- Summer tanager (Piranga rubra)
- Scarlet tanager (Piranga olivacea)
- Western tanager (Piranga ludoviciana)
- Flame-colored tanager (Piranga bidentata)
- Northern cardinal (Cardinalis cardinalis)
- Pyrrhuloxia (Cardinalis sinuatus)
- Yellow grosbeak (Pheucticus chrysopeplus)
- Rose-breasted grosbeak (Pheucticus ludovicianus)
- Black-headed grosbeak (Pheucticus melanocephalus)
- Blue grosbeak (Passerina caerulea)
- Lazuli bunting (Passerina amoena)
- Indigo bunting (Passerina cyanea)
- Varied bunting (Passerina versicolor)
- Painted bunting (Passerina ciris)
- Dickcissel (Spiza americana)
