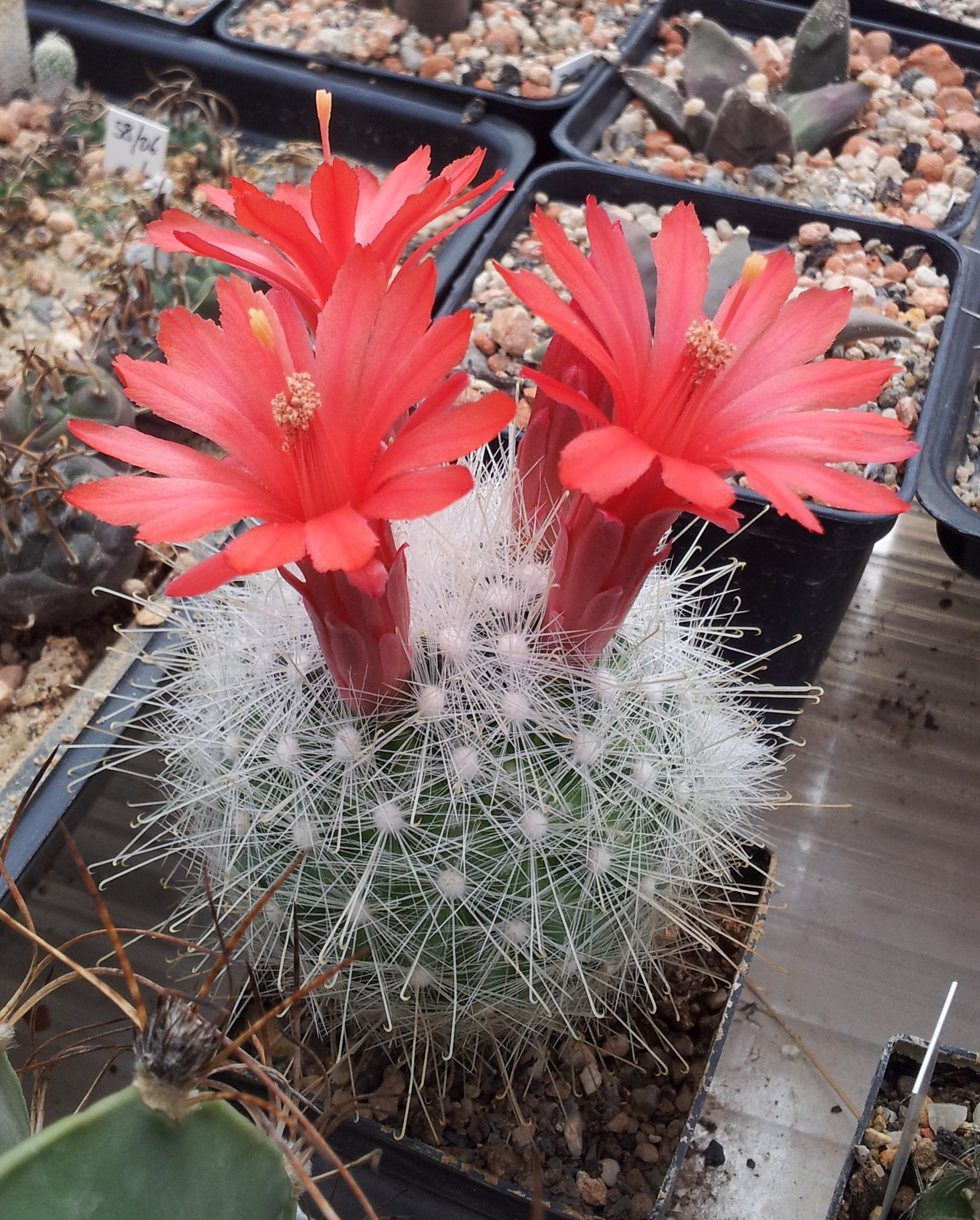

Conservation status
- Least Concern (IUCN 3.1)

Scientific classification
- Kingdom: Plantae
- Clade: Tracheophytes
- Clade: Angiosperms
- Clade: Eudicots
- Order: Caryophyllales
- Family: Cactaceae
- Subfamily: Cactoideae
- Genus: Mammillaria
- Species: M. senilis

Binomial name
- Mammillaria senilis Lodd. in Salm-Dyck

Synonyms
- Mammillaria diguetii (F.A.C. Weber) H.P. Kelsey & Dayton; Mamillopsis senilis (Lodd. ex Salm-Dyck) F.A.C. Weber ex Britton & Rose; Mamillopsis diguetii (F.A.C. Weber) Britton & Rose; Cactus senilis (Lodd. ex Salm-Dyck) Kuntze

= Mammillaria senilis =

Species of cactus

Mammillaria senilis is a species of cacti in the tribe Cacteae. It is native to Mexico, where it is found in the states of Chihuahua, Durango, Jalisco, Nayarit, Sinaloa and in south Zacatecas.

== Description ==
The cactus grows in groups, and grow up to 8 inches tall. They form large red flowers that range from 5.5 to 6 centimeters in diameter.

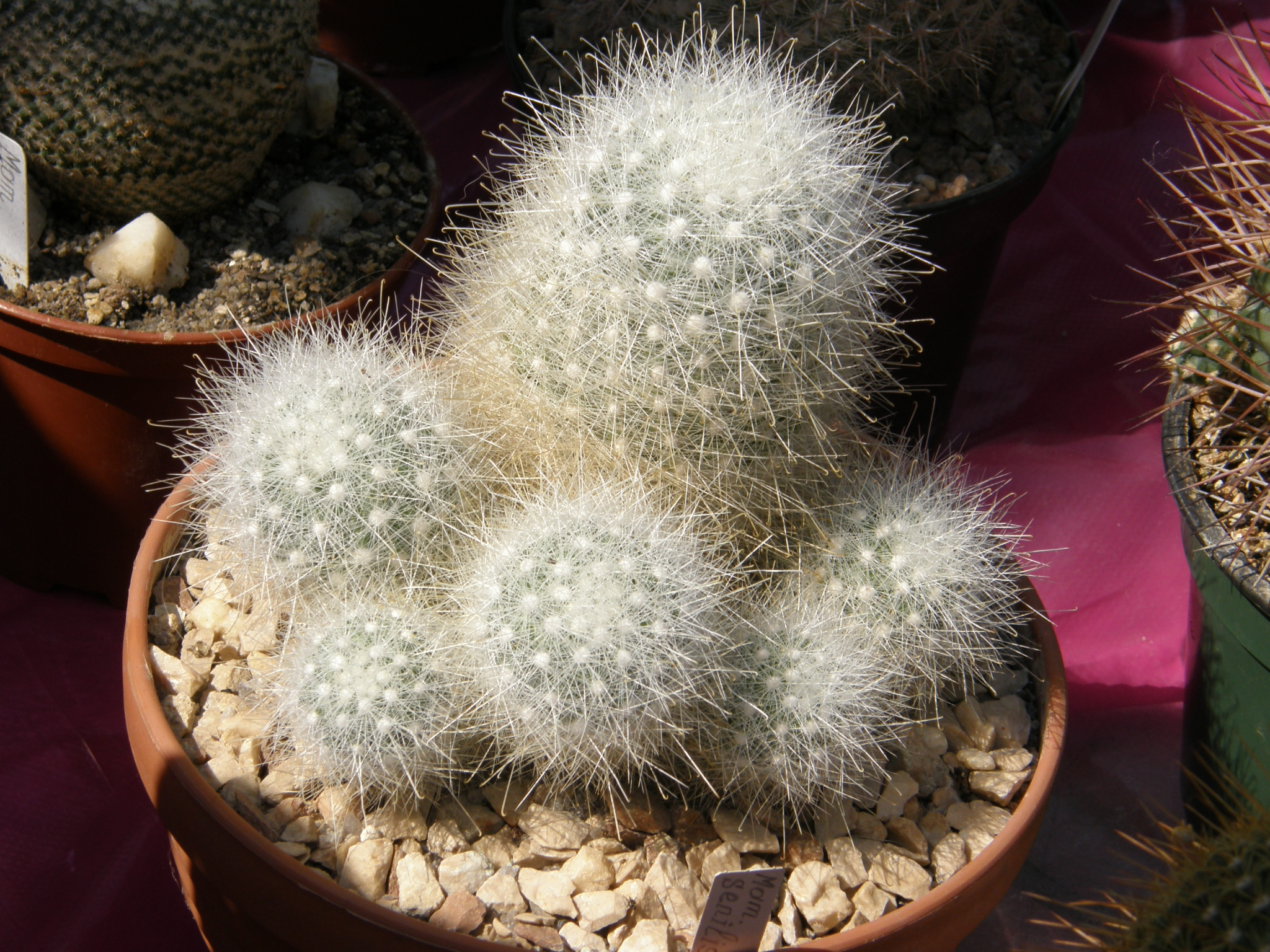
