= Sierra los Huicholes =

Mountain range in western Mexico

Highest point
- Elevation: 1,721 m (5,646 ft)

Geography
- Country: Mexico
- State(s): Jalisco, Nayarit, and Zacatecas
- terrestrial ecoregion: Sierra Madre Occidental pine–oak forests
- Parent range: Sierra Madre Occidental

The Sierra los Huicholes is a mountain range in western Mexico. It is located in the states of Nayarit, Jalisco, and Zacatecas. The Sierra los Huicholes is part of the Sierra Madre Occidental, and is located in the southern portion of the range.

The mountains are named for the Huichol, a people who live in the range and in the river valleys west and east of it.

== Geography ==
The Sierra los Huicholes runs roughly north and south, dividing the basin of the Bolaños River to the east from that of the Huaynamota and its tributaries the Atengo (or Chapalagana) and Camotlán to the west. Both the Bolaños and the Huaynamota empty into the Río Grande de Santiago, and the canyon of the Grande de Santiago defines the southern end of the Sierra.

== Flora and fauna ==
The mountains are covered with tropical dry forest and dry shrubland at lower elevations. Oak forests occur above 800 meters elevation, transitioning to pine–oak and pine forests at the higher elevations with a cool climate.

The mountains are home to some of the last remaining old growth pine–oak and pine forests in the Sierra Madre Occidental, and are also home to many limited-range and threatened species, including the thick-billed parrot (Rhynchopsitta pachyrhyncha). CONABIO, Mexico's government biodiversity agency, identified the Sierra los Huicholes as a priority for conservation because of its biodiversity and areas of relatively intact habitat.

Much of the Sierra is in the Cuenca Alimentadora del Distrito Nacional de Riego 043 Estado de Nayarit, a national natural resources protection area. It was established in 1949 to protect forests and watersheds for the benefit of downstream agriculture, and was redesignated a national resources protection area in 2002.
