= Atengo River =

Coordinates: 21°57′22″N 104°31′11″W

Location
- Country: Mexico

Physical characteristics
- Mouth
  - location: Río Grande de Santiago
- Basin size: 12,080 km^{2}

The Atengo River, also known as the Chapalagana River, is a river of Mexico. It is a tributary of the Huaynamota River in the southern Sierra Madre Occidental. Its basin is bounded on the east by the Sierra los Huicholes.

== See also ==
- List of rivers of Mexico
