= Sierra Fría =

Mountain range in central Mexico

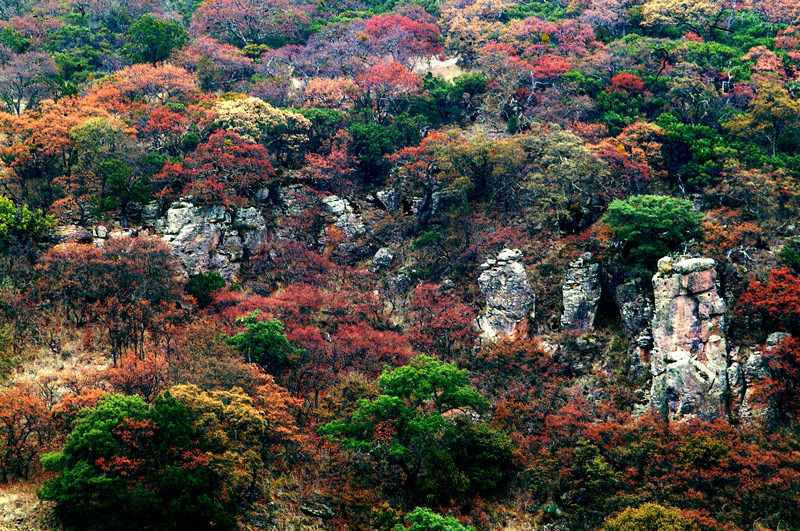

Highest point
- Peak: Cerro de la Ardilla
- Elevation: 3,050 m (10,010 ft)
- Coordinates: 22°12′58″N 102°37′8″W

Geography
- Location within Mexico
- Country: Mexico
- States: Aguascalientes and Zacatecas
- Parent range: Sierra Madre Occidental

The Sierra Fría is a mountain range in central Mexico. It forms the northwestern border of Aguascalientes state and extends into adjacent Zacatecas, west of the city of Aguascalientes.

== Geography ==
The Sierra Fría is the southeasternmost range of the Sierra Madre Occidental. The highest peak is Cerro de la Ardilla (3050 m). The Sierra extends north and south, and divides the upper basins of the Juchipila River to the west from the Río Verde to the east.

The municipalities of San José de Gracia, Calvillo, Rincón de Romos, Jesús María and Pabellón de Arteaga extend across the range.

== Climate ==
Much of the surrounding area is a subtropical highland climate with heavy thunderstorms and rainfall common during the summer months and snowfall is rare, occurring once per year.

== Flora and fauna ==
Higher elevations of the range are covered in pine–oak woodland, with pines and/or oaks as the dominant trees, with manzanillo (Arbutus spp.) and juniper. Areas that have been logged are covered in thickets of manzanillo, and montane grasslands occur on canyon slopes. Matorral (dry shrubland) surrounds the Sierra at lower elevations.

The area is rich in wildlife. Native mammals include white-tailed deer (Odocoileus virginianus), puma (Puma concolor), collared peccary (Dicotyles tajacu), ringtail (Bassariscus astutus), and gray fox (Urocyon cinereoargenteus).

109 species of birds have been recorded in the range, of which 67% are year-round residents and 33% are winter visitors. These include the golden eagle (Aquila chrysaetos), peregrine falcon (Falco peregrinus), Harris's hawk (Parabuteo unicinctus), Mexican spotted owl (Strix occidentalis lucida), great horned owl (Bubo virginianus), eared quetzal (Euptilotis neoxenus), Montezuma quail (Cyrtonyx montezumae), lesser scaup (Aythya affinis), and northern pintail (Anas acuta). The Sierra is designated and Important Bird Area.

== Conservation and tourism ==
Much of the range is in protected areas, including the Cuenca Alimentadora del Distrito Nacional de Riego 043 Estado de Nayarit and Cuenca Alimentadora del Distrito Nacional de Riego 01 Pabellón. Camping, hiking, nature walks, horseback riding, and mountain biking are permitted, and hunting and sport fishing are permitted with prior permission.
