= Huajimic =

Coordinates: 21°42′N 104°20′W

Huajimic is a small village in the municipality of La Yesca in the Mexican State of Nayarit. It was founded on March 19, 1610 as a mission by priest Franciscano Fray Francisco Barrios.

== Climate ==
Climate data for Huajimic
Month	Jan	Feb	Mar	Apr	May	Jun	Jul	Aug	Sep	Oct	Nov	Dec	Year
Mean daily maximum °C (°F)	27.6 (81.7)	28.7 (83.7)	30.8 (87.4)	33 (91)	34.3 (93.7)	32.9 (91.2)	30 (86)	29.9 (85.8)	30 (86)	30.1 (86.2)	29.8 (85.6)	27.6 (81.7)	30.4 (86.7)
Mean daily minimum °C (°F)	6.4 (43.5)	6.3 (43.3)	7.6 (45.7)	9.3 (48.7)	12 (54)	16.6 (61.9)	17.4 (63.3)	17.4 (63.3)	17 (63)	14.1 (57.4)	9.2 (48.6)	7.1 (44.8)	11.7 (53.1)
Average precipitation mm (inches)	30 (1.2)	13 (0.5)	5.1 (0.2)	2.5 (0.1)	10 (0.4)	160 (6.3)	230 (9)	240 (9.5)	170 (6.6)	53 (2.1)	13 (0.5)	25 (1)	960 (37.6)
Source: Weatherbase
