= Sierra Madre Occidental =

Mountain range along the Pacific coast of Mexico

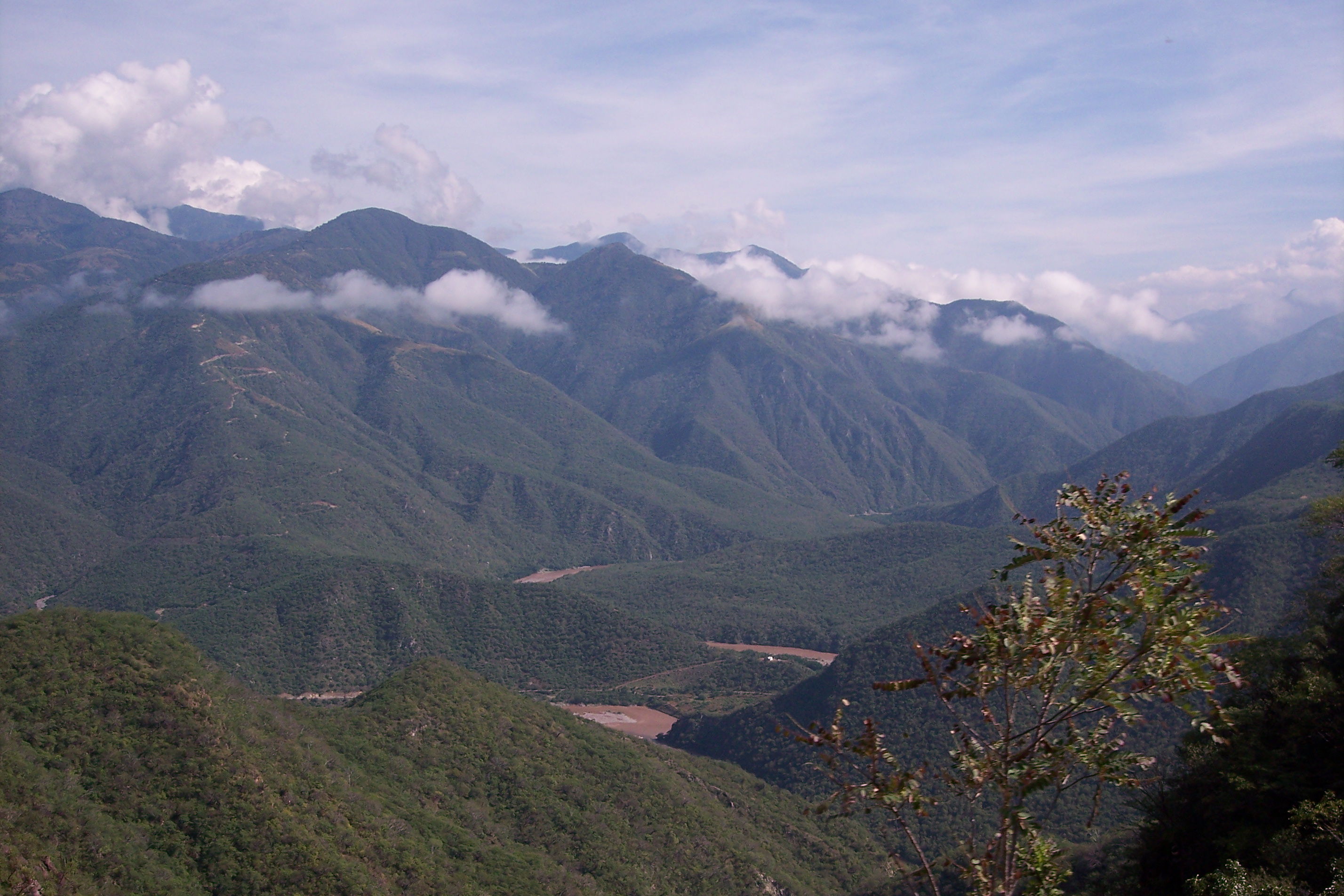
- Río Grande de Santiago winding through the Sierra Madre Occidental, forming part of the border between Nayarit and Jalisco.

Highest point
- Peak: Cerro Gordo
- Elevation: 10,863 ft (3,311 m)
- Coordinates: 25°57′22″N 107°2′52″W

Dimensions
- Length: 932 mi (1,500 km) NW × SE
- Width: 150 mi (240 km) W × E

Geography
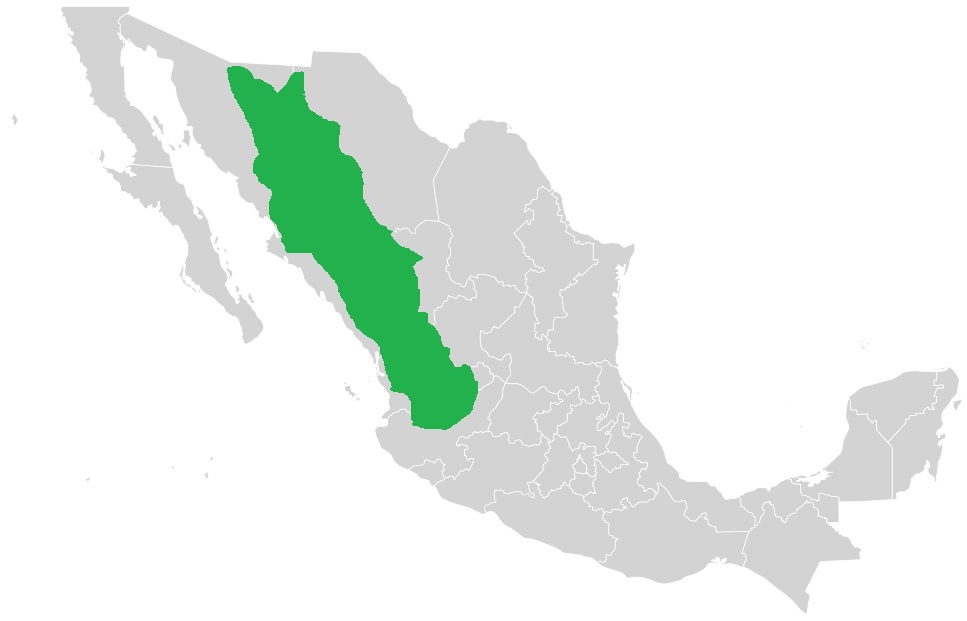
- Country: Mexico
- State(s): Sonora, Chihuahua, Sinaloa, Durango, Zacatecas, Nayarit, Jalisco, Aguascalientes
- Region: Northwestern Mexico
- Borders on: Sea of Cortés–Pacific: W; Altiplanicie Mexicana: E; Trans-Mexican Volcanic Belt: S; (Cordillera Neovolcanica)

The Sierra Madre Occidental ('Western Mother/Grand Mountain Range') is a major mountain range system which runs northwest–southeast through northwestern and western Mexico, and along the Gulf of California. The Sierra Madre is part of the American Cordillera, an almost continuous chain of mountain ranges that forms the western "backbone" of the Americas.

== Etymology ==
The Spanish name sierra madre means "mother mountain range" in English, and occidental means "western", these thus being the "Western mother mountain range". To the east, from the Spanish oriental meaning "eastern" in English, the Sierra Madre Oriental range or "Eastern mother mountain range" runs generally parallel to the Sierra Madre Occidental along eastern Mexico and the Gulf of Mexico.

The range extends from northern Sonora, a state near the Mexico–U.S. border at Arizona, southeast towards to the Trans-Mexican Volcanic Belt and Sierra Madre del Sur ranges. The high plateau that is formed by the range is cut by deep river valleys. This plateau is formed from volcanic rock overlying a basement of metamorphic rock.

This uplift has caused changes in weather patterns; increased rainfall occurring in the mountains has provided areas where ecosystems can form in wetter areas than surrounding land. This water source forms watersheds that provide the arid surroundings with water that makes it possible to irrigate and farm crops. The wet ecosystems are islands of biodiversity, differing significantly from what would otherwise be a desert landscape. Oak forests are the predominant plant life, and extend into the lowland deserts.

This forest and canyon land provided a place for a variety of indigenous people to live, until Spanish settlers with associated mestizos came into the area to found towns for the silver mines in the area. The major industries in the area now are agriculture and forestry, which have become contentious because of land degradation and the native population's opposition to these practices.

== Geography ==
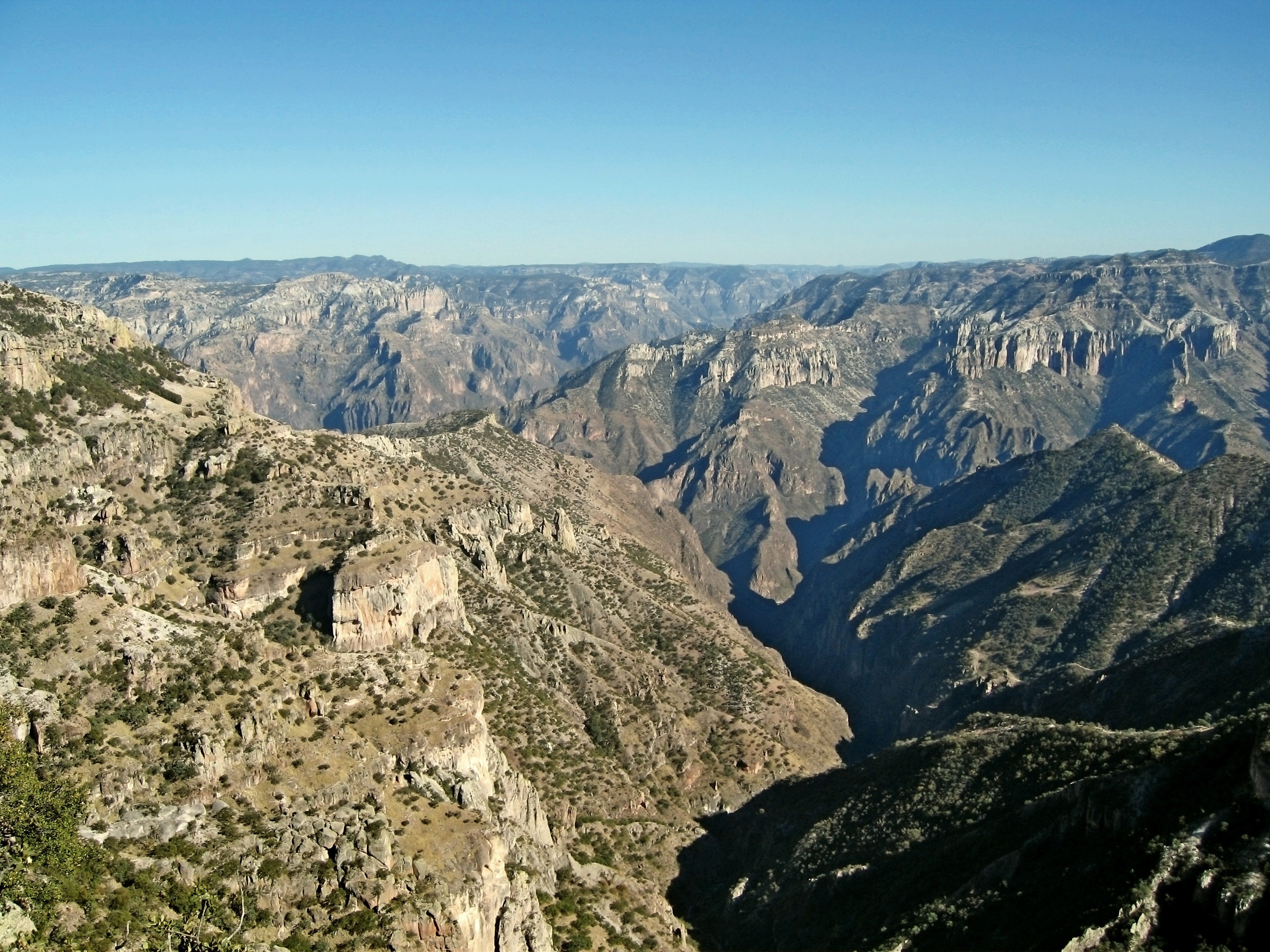
Copper Canyon in Chihuahua, Mexico

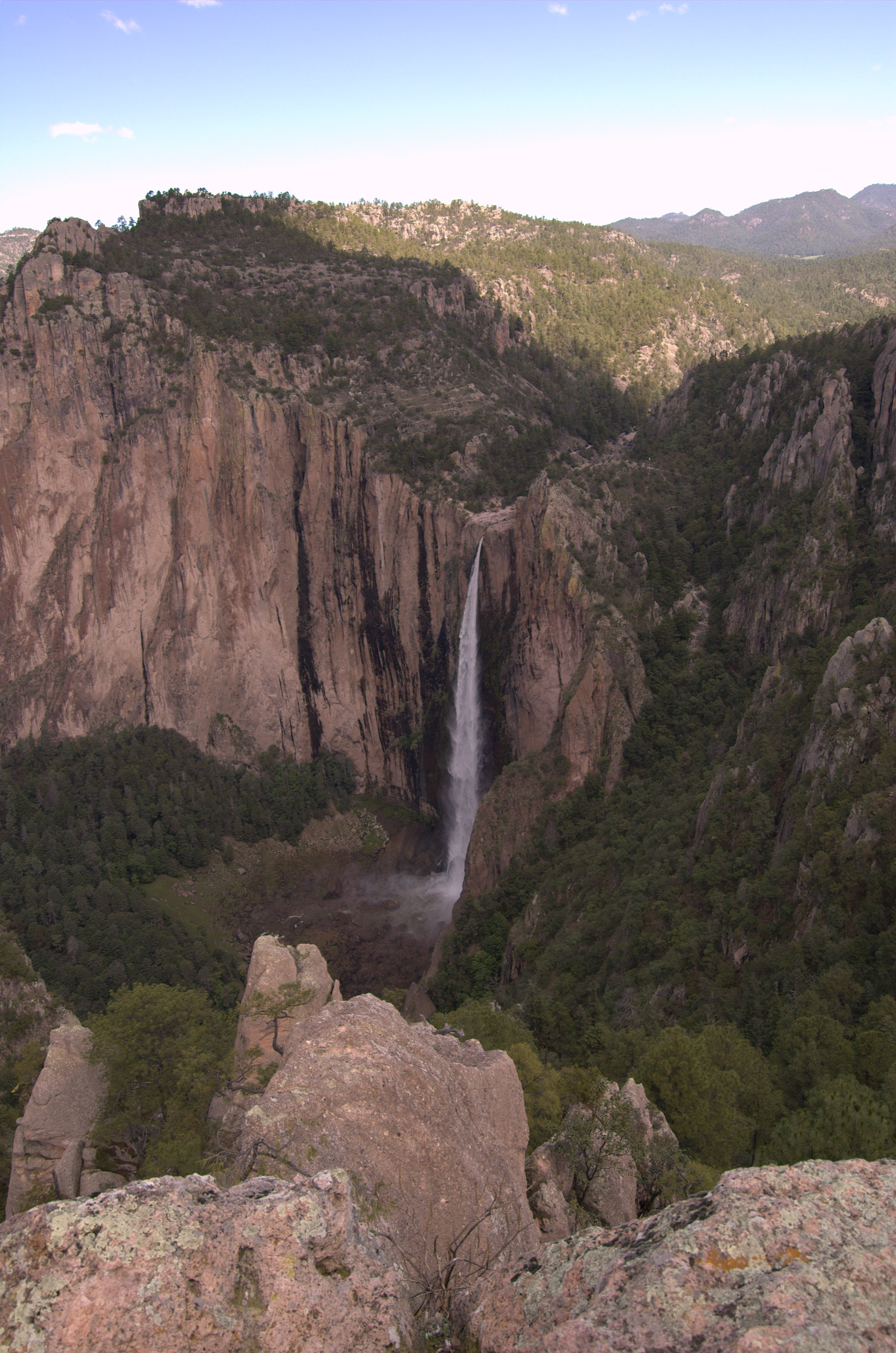
Basaseachic Falls

The range trends from the north to southeast. Canyons cut by the rivers of the wet western slopes exist in addition to those of the northeast slopes, notably the Copper Canyon.

=== Location ===
The range runs parallel to the Pacific coast of Mexico, from just south of the Arizona-Sonora border southeast through eastern Sonora, western Chihuahua, Sinaloa, Durango, Zacatecas, Nayarit, Jalisco, Aguascalientes to Guanajuato, where it joins with the Sierra Madre del Sur and the Eje Volcánico Transversal (Transverse Volcanic Axis) of central Mexico after crossing 1,250 km (780 mi). The mountains range from 300 km (190 mi) from the Gulf of California in the north, but begin to approach within 50 km (30 mi) of the Pacific in the south. These mountains are generally considered to be part of the much larger American cordillera, the mountains extending from Alaska down to these across western North America.

=== Regions ===
Sierra Tarahumara or Tarahumara is the name for the region of the Sierra Madre beginning at the Durango border and extending north. This name comes from the Tarahumara natives. This is a dramatic landscape of steep mountains formed by a high plateau that has been cut through with canyons including Copper Canyon, larger and, in places, deeper than the Grand Canyon. This plateau has an average elevation of 2,250 m (7,380 ft) with most of the more eroded canyons on the western slope, due to the higher moisture content.

The highest elevations occur in the Tarahumara range. The exact elevations of the highest peaks are not known within accurate enough ranges to determine their relative elevation. The highest point is probably Cerro Mohinora, located at 25°57′N 107°03′W. Estimates for the height of the mountain start around 3,040 m (9,970 ft) and go up to 3,300 m (10,800 ft). However, Cerro Barajas, at 26°24′N 106°5′W, may be as high as 3,300 m (10,800 ft) although other sources give 3,170 m (10,400 ft) as the elevation. Cerro Gordo, at 23°12′N 104°57′W, may have an elevation between 3,350 m (10,990 ft) and 3,340 m (10,960 ft).

The southern end of the mountains may be referred to as the Sierra Huichola. In this area, the Sierra Madre begins to give way to the Basin and Range Province. Subranges of this area include the Sierra de Alica and the Sierra Pajaritos, both in Nayarit, and the Sierra los Huicholes, Sierra de Morones, Sierra Nochistlán, and Sierra Fría extending eastwards into Jalisco, Zacatecas, and Aguascalientes.

=== Water ===
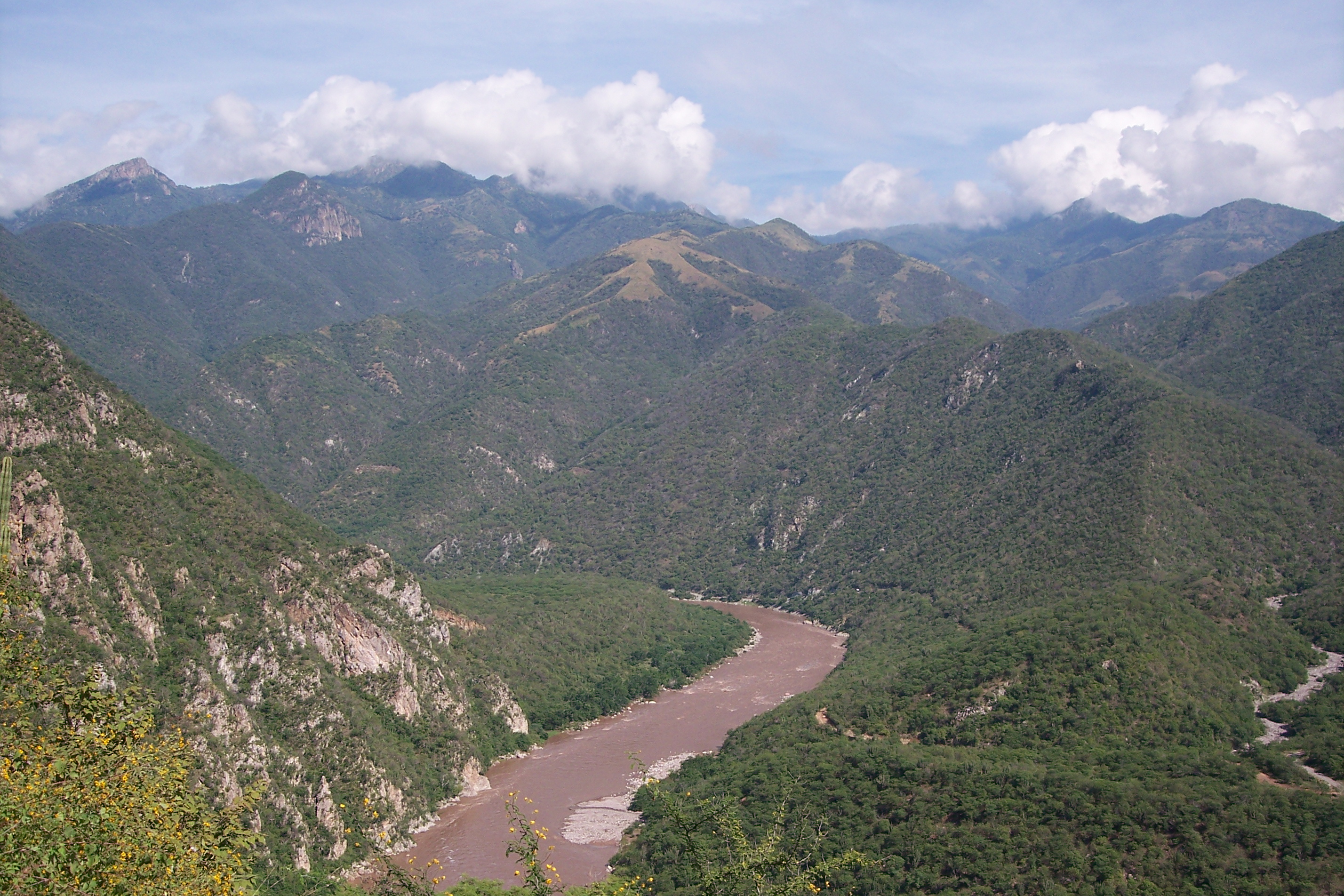
The Rio Santiago

The mountains act as a source of water, in an otherwise arid environment from the increased precipitation from the mountain range. As such, rivers that have headwaters in the mountains provide water for irrigation in the surrounding lands. The need for water to irrigate prompted the construction of dams, which has been the source of several environmental concerns in the area.

The northern end of the range is more arid; hence, the Yaqui River, which drains that area, is an important source of irrigation in the state of Sonora. The Yaqui drains into the Gulf of California, as do the Fuerte River in Sinaloa and the Humaya River further south. The Río Grande de Santiago drains 100,000 km^{2} (39,000 sq mi) from the southern slopes of the Sierra Madre. Along the more arid eastern slopes of the mountains, the Nazas River and Aguanaval River drain the mountains into a closed basin. These mountains supply 90% of the water used for irrigation within the watershed. North of this system is the Conchos River which drains into the Rio Grande.

Along many rivers the arid conditions have caused courses to be dammed to provide water for irrigation. These dams have caused concerns along with those caused by other activities. The Yaqui has been dammed with three large reservoirs along its course. The Río Grande de Santiago has also been dammed, including the Aguamilpa Dam begun in 1991 and the El Cajón Dam upstream from it. To provide irrigation water for farming the dry basin, the Nazas river was dammed in the 1930s and 1940s. This has led to the former drainage lakes in the area drying up, and soil depletion from the elimination of the river as a source of soil. Due to the continued logging in the area, erosion on the slopes of hillsides has increased.

=== Human ===
Numerous small populations live in Copper Canyon, some of them around old missions. Many settlements consist of single families or small family groups near agricultural fields. There are also a few towns of note, including Creel, Chihuahua, with 5,000 inhabitants; it serves as a stop on the train line. South of Copper Canyon is the town of El Salto, Durango, situated along highway 40. To the west is Copala, Sinaloa.

To the south live the indigenous Cora people in the towns of Jesús María and La Mesa del Nayar. In addition, 1,000 people live in the village of Huajimic in Nayarit. The Bolaños River valley of Jalisco is populated with mining communities, such as San Martín de Bolaños, which has a population of around 3,000.

Few paved roads cross the mountains, meaning that travel times can be long, even between cities that are relatively close. In the north, Mexico Federal Highway 16 connects Hermosillo, Sonora and La Junta, Chihuahua. In the mountains, the La Entrada al Pacifico Corridor is an incomplete road intended to connect Los Mochis, Sinaloa and Chihuahua. Durango and Mazatlán are connected by highway 40, around 24 degrees north latitude.

== Geology ==
The Sierra Madre Occidental is a high plateau of volcanic rock that is eroded in areas to reveal a basement composed of plutonic and sedimentary rocks underlying the two groups of extrusive volcanics. The lower of these groups is a series of volcanic rocks formed by lava flows. The surface of the plateau is made up of a second series of volcanic ignimbrites, covered mostly by clay rich organic soils. Some intrusions in the area have deposited ore veins that are commercially viable.

The landscape was shaped after rock placement. Rivers cut valleys into the plateau, following folds in the rocks. Rocks have broken off of the slopes, forming rocky sides. The bedrock is covered by the clay rich soils, except in eroded areas, where water carries away deposits leaving a stony surface.

=== Geological history ===
The basement is thought to be Older North American basement, especially in the North, and a number of different accreted terranes, which are mostly covered by Cenozoic volcanism. The northern extent of the Sierra Madre is the Cortés Terrane, although the northern extreme of this contains a small portion of the Carborca Terrane. Some of the northern end may also be underlain by a Precambrian basement placed around the same time as the Grenville Orogeny. Some of this area has a series of Paleozoic sedimentary sequences from a deep marine environment underlying it, considered by some to be part of the Cotes Terrane and by others to be transported. In some areas, distinct sedimentary rocks can be identified by shallow-water Silurian and Mississippian sedimentary rocks underlying deep-water Pennsylvanian and Permian, which are divided by Mississippian rhyolite. The Permian clastics contain some detrital rock that sit alongside low-grade metamorphosed sedimentary and volcanic rocks with serpentinite.

South of the Cortes and Carborca Terranes is the San José de García Terrane, which is a combination of Cretaceous arc volcanics and volcaniclastics, which may be thrusting over the Cortes terrane. The southern part of the range is made up of the Guerrero Composite Terrane, a large body, which is actually a complex of five different subterranes, not all of them within the main body of the Sierra Madre. However, the terrane is mostly covered by volcanics and sedimentary deposits, so it is only visible where erosion has revealed it. The main subterranes of the Guerrero Composite Terrane that are within the Sierra Madre are the Tahue and Zihuatanejo terranes. Dividing the Guerrero Terrane from the rest of the Sierra Madre terranes is a boundary that is thought to represent the Early Cretaceous Arperos Basin, a marine basin which separated the island arc that came to form the Guerrero terrane from the accretions that came to form the Sierra Madre terrane. It contains a lower formation made up of pillow basalts with pillow breccias, tuffs, and shales underlying a group of pelagic limestones, oozes, and turbidites.

Covering the southern basement are sedimentary and metamorphosed sedimentary rocks containing argillite, limestone, volcanic schist, slate, and greywacke which were exposed in the canyon of the Santiago River. Near these sediments late Oligocene to early Miocene granite and granodiorite intrusive bodies occur. A possible cause of this is that these bodies were roof pendants which were uplifted by plutons. Mesozoic limestone also occurs in northern portion of the mountains, mostly from the Cretaceous.

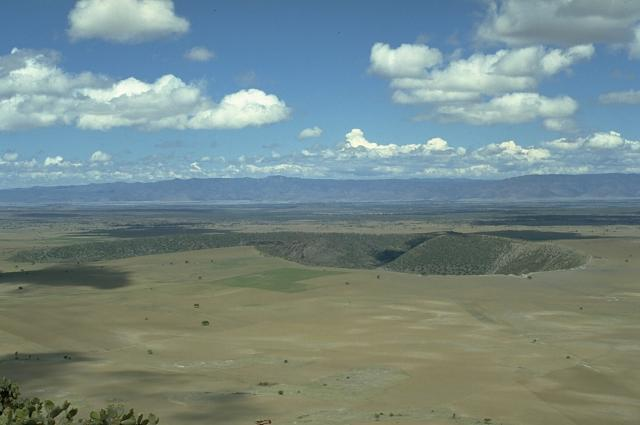
The Durango Volcanic field

Towards the end of the Cretaceous, the Laramide orogeny increased the activity of magmatism in the area, forming the first major igneous series in the area. The igneous series are made up of formations of plutonic and volcanic rock, which would later be exposed. Interbedded with these rocks are sedimentary deposit rocks. In the center of the range, some of these rocks have been deformed by tectonic forcing that occurred at the same time. The southern part of the range contains none of the volcanism that is apparent in the northern range. These formations ended in the Paleocene. Eocene volcanism formed a series of andesitic and rhyolitic formations in the area, with spatial and temporal variations throughout. Most of the gold and silver deposits are also in these rocks.

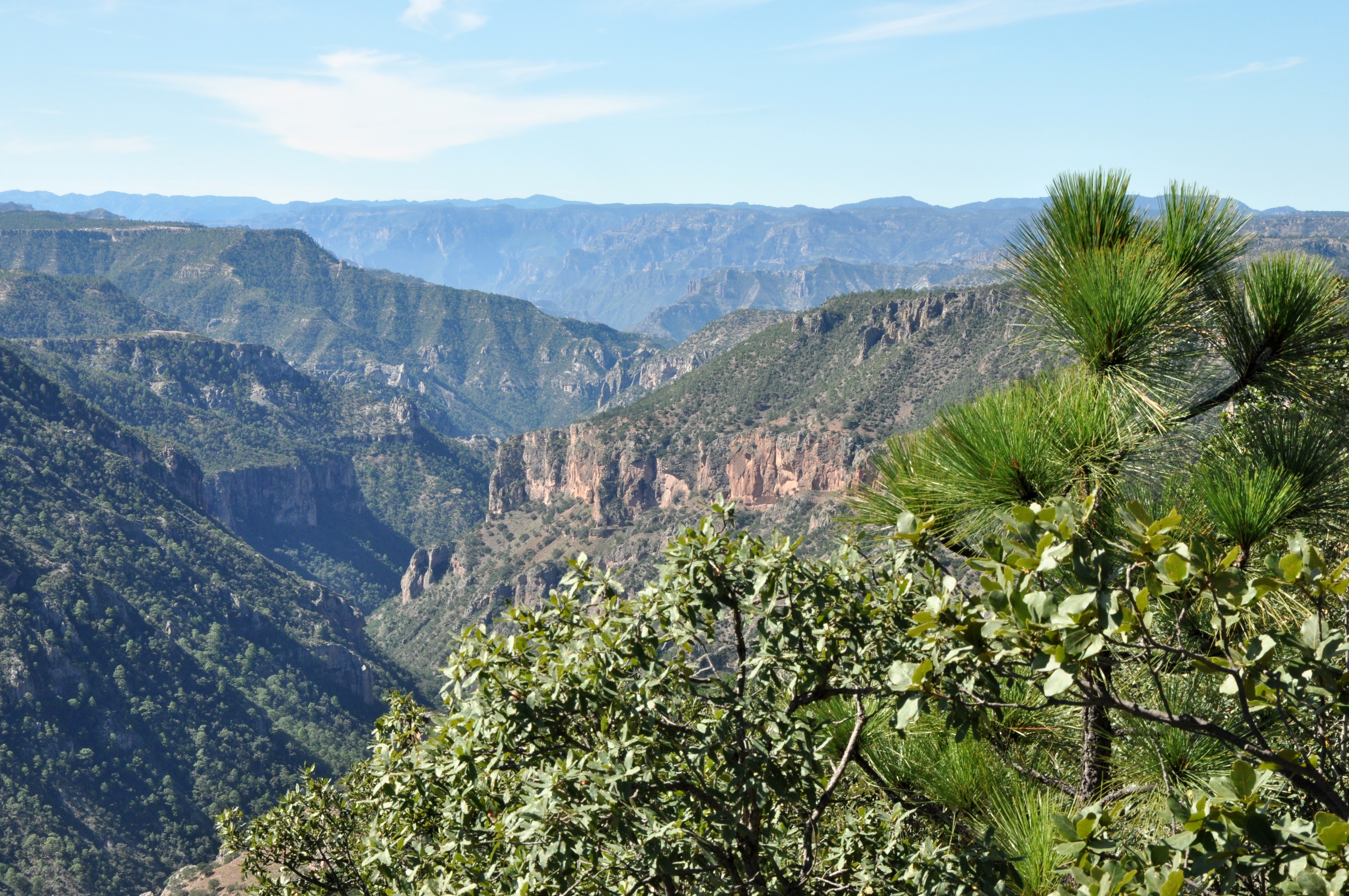
An example of the ignimbrite units

In the Oligocene, ash flows became the predominant deposit of the area, with interbedded lava flows between. These ash flows began the second series of high magmatism formations. The Mid-Tertiary ignimbrite flare-up formed a series of ignimbrite formations, layered one atop another, that are sometimes broken by lava flows. The ignimbrite formations in this area cover the largest area of any known series, with ten calderas identified in the province. Three of these calderas are in Copper Canyon. The lava has formed a series of mafic rocks that comprise the Southern Cordilleran Basaltic Andesite Suite. The tuffs are above a thick formation of lava rock. Around five or six units have been identified, mostly around the Copper Canyon area. These tuffs have allowed wide-ranging correlation with formations in other geographical areas, for example Death Valley.

During the Miocene, three periods of volcanism marked separate events in the Sierras. Each period is marked by different volcanic processes. The first was a continuation of the Oligocene flare-up, which lasted through the early Miocene. This may be a distinct second occurrence of the same process, placing silica-rich lava above Oligocene rocks. Also in the early Miocene more intermediate basaltic andesites occur along faults and in grabens. Beginning in the early Miocene and continuing into the middle, an arc of andesite was placed during the spreading of the Gulf of California. The basin and range-style faulting of the middle-late Miocene took place at the same time as the placement of alkali basalts, In the westernmost slopes mafic dikes formed. These events have also been linked to the subduction of the Farallon Plate. Episodes of volcanism continued into the Quaternary.

=== Structures ===
The Sierras are believed to be a thick core covered by volcanics and eroded by numerous rivers. Some have suggested that the basement of the mountains have numerous intrusions made by mafic magma. At their surface, the mountains are made up of large-scale ignimbrite sheet that has been incised by rivers flowing from rainfall in the mountains. The surface of the plateau is almost exclusively from the second series of flows causing the rock that is most visible to be ignimbrites with lava flow layers. The region has a general strike from just west of north to just south of east.

Faults in the area tend to be younger than the upper volcanics, excluding those associated with calderas, but do occur in distinct periods. The large faults along the eastern slope have caused the slope to be made up of large escarpments that face into the interior basins. These faults are commonly covered by alluvium and basalt, making them difficult to discern, but can be found in certain fault blocks.

Grabens have formed in the north, and some of these are filled with volcanic and sedimentary floors, and long depressions have formed in the southern Sierra Madre. The faulting decreases in the center of the range where the faults are mostly small normal faults, but increases once again on the western slope. In fact, the major normal faults tend to diverge around the center of the core and join at either end. Some of these faults may have allowed ignimbrites to erupt from the surface, and so there may be some association between the ignimbrite occurrence and faults; this can be used to find out information about different kinds of basement rock present.

There are two faults dividing the Sierra Madre from the central Mexican Plateau. The more southern one is the north–south Aguascalientes fault extending 150 kilometres (93 mi) from Altos de Jalisco to near Zacatecas, where it joins the more northern northwest–southeast trending San Luis–Tepehuanes fault extending from Guanajuato to Durango. The southern boundary of the Sierra Madre Occidental with the Jalisco block is a series of folds, thrust, and left lateral faults date from the middle Miocene. This may be evidence for a left transpressional shear zone. The area between this boundary and the Aguascalientes fault is filled with numerous grabens and half-grabens, as well an east–west left shear zone, the El Roble shear zone. At the west end of these grabens and half-grabens are the Pochotitan and the more northerly San Pedro fault systems, which form the western boundary of the faults in the southern mountains. In the north there is an unknown boundary between the Cortes Terrane and the Guerrero Composite Terrane. Some theorize that this is a section of the Mojave–Sonora Megashear, but this theory is not universally accepted; however, the Megashear is important, and, in fact, is necessary for reconstructions of the opening of the Gulf of California, as of 2003.

=== Mineral deposits ===
On a smaller scale, mineral deposits are distributed in formations of the Sierra Madre, although the events that placed these deposits vary throughout the mountains. The Guerrero composite terrane contains many of the economic deposits, often found in ore bodies younger than the Cretaceous.

Gold and silver deposits most commonly occur in the altered andesites of the early volcanics, typically these deposits are between 30 and 50 million years old. These are believed to be caused by later intrusions into the early flows. Fissure-vein deposits have been divided into two groups of fissure vein deposits, which are divided geographically into an eastern and western series. In the east, the gold and silver are accompanied by lead and zinc. In the south, the Bolaños mine district is contained with the Bolaños Graben. Some also occur as epithermal deposits. Also, some gold occurs along with copper in Cenozoic iron-oxide skarn and replacement deposits along the Pacific.

In addition to gold and silver and their related deposits, tin, iron, and mercury occur, sometimes in later units, mostly in later volcanics, and Molybdenum occurs in the mountains, often along with older copper deposits or in Oligocene deposits in the east. The belt of tin deposits lies mostly within the eastern slopes from Durango to Guanajuato. In these areas, tin occurs in rhyolitic ignimbrites in many, possibly over 1000, small deposits of cassiterite. Typically these deposits are divided from overlying ignimbrites by breccia, which may also contain ore. Many of these are thought to be hydrothermal deposits To the east of these units is a belt of more mercury deposits, followed by another belt of manganese deposits, although these deposits are mostly limited to Chihuahua and Hidalgo. Iron occurs in three different regions placed by different mechanisms. Along the Pacific there the numerous skarn and replacement deposits mentioned above with relation to gold. Iron occurs in Durango in the form of magnetite lava flows, which are often surrounded by smaller hematite deposits, thought to be ash flows. There is also a belt of iron deposits further east.

=== Soil ===
Most soil in the mountains is covered by an organic-rich layer over layers rich in clay. Soils are commonly phaeozems that are up to 100 centimetres (39 in). Some soils are cambisols that are less than 2 metres (6.6 ft) deep and well-drained. Due to the high clay content, which blocks water from being absorbed into the soil, larger rock particles in the soil help reduce runoff and soil losses from erosion. Areas that are covered in stone are known as lithosols, and make up most of the remaining surface in the mountains, especially on upper slopes. The last major soil type are vertisols, which are thin mineral-poor soils. Soils at higher elevations experience more leaching, due to increased rainfall. Acidic soils may have lower calcium content, leading to lower plant soil quality. Soils along the eastern slopes have increased organic content and a clay heavy layer that is developed more than those of the more arid eastern lands. The thickness of soil layers also increases.

Problems with soil degradation have been aggravated by the cultivation of drug crops, leading to deforestation of many areas. Other problems include overgrazing, which has led to terracing from cattle paths and the formation of a soil crust, and soil acidification, which poses a risk to some grasslands as of 2002.

== Climate ==
The climate varies considerably between the northern and southern extents of this long mountain range. Seasonal variations also occur due to the presence of large bodies of warm water delivering warm damp air from each side of the range. This region undergoes a seasonal variety with two wet seasons, including a summer monsoon, and two dry seasons each year.

=== Temperature, pressure, and wind ===
Air pressure changes in northwestern Mexico and the southwest United States are the main causes of seasonal variation in the Sierra Madre. A high pressure area that rests over the mountains in the winter begins to move north of the mountains into New Mexico during the month of June. The high pressure begins to break down and move south during September or October; however, the breakdown is usually at a slower pace than the movement north. This high pressure belt is associated with the mechanics that form the Bermuda High.

The climate in the mountains is mild. Summer temperatures maintain a constant level. Maximum temperatures are typically in July at around 31 C with average temperatures of the order of 16 C during this same period. Mean annual temperatures are between 13–18 °C (55–65 °F) above 1,800 metres (6,000 ft). Below-freezing temperatures can occur in the higher mountains, with precipitation occurring as snowfall certain times of year.

During the summer monsoon, wind patterns undergo large-scale changes. In May there is very little large-scale wind current through the mountains, most circulates around the mountains, although onshore flow is present. As the high pressure moves north, air is pulled off the Gulf of Mexico, bringing easterly winds aloft to the mountains. On the east slope of the mountain, daytime upslope winds flow to the crest, where the flow joins westerly winds. The mountains cause convection during the following monsoon season, during which nocturnal winds at low levels in the atmosphere move moisture overnight. Extensive lightning activity occurs during this season. After the high pressure breaks down, wind patterns return to those prior to the monsoon season.

=== Precipitation and humidity ===
Precipitation varies on both annual and seasonal scales in the Sierra Madre. Annual differences in regional climate are associated with the El Niño-Southern Oscillation with El Niño years leading to a wetter climate. Monsoon rains come to the Sierra Madre in June as the high pressure area moves north, leading to wet summer seasons. This causes east winds bringing moisture from the Gulf of Mexico. On the western side of the mountains, which are affected by the largest change in precipitation between the dry season and monsoon season, in the monsoon season rainfall can exceed 300 mm (12 in) in a single month. The southern region receives more of the rainfall than the northern. Much of this precipitation occurs as tropical storms. As the high pressure over New Mexico breaks down, rainfall in the Sierra Madre ends. Because of the monsoon, the summer accounts for the majority of rainfall in the area. The spring and fall dry season separate out a weaker wet season in the winter. In addition to increasing in the southern ranges of the mountains, rainfall increases in the higher elevations of the Sierra Madre Occidental.

Humidity in the mountains varies at wide levels as does rainfall. In the early morning before dawn, the air is almost saturated (often over 90% relative humidity) near the mountain tops with low clouds over the range. Lower in the range, air is not as near saturated in the morning. Seasonal variation in humidity is also present with average May and June relative humidity around 50%, with 25% possible during the day. Also during the day, relative humidity drops and cloud levels rise as temperatures rise. The humidity of the range is also influenced by the same seasonal changes as rainfall. In the dry season dew points are low at high elevations (500 hPa), around −22 °C (−8 °F) in the south of the range, and −24 and −26 °C (−11 and −15 °F) in the north in May. In June, dew points begin to increase from the May levels up to −20 °C (−4 °F) in the north and −16 °C (3 °F) in the south. By July these dew points are at −14 °C (7 °F) throughout the range. The range allows higher dew points throughout these periods than the surrounding low lands. This rise in humidity accompanies the monsoon.

== Ecology ==
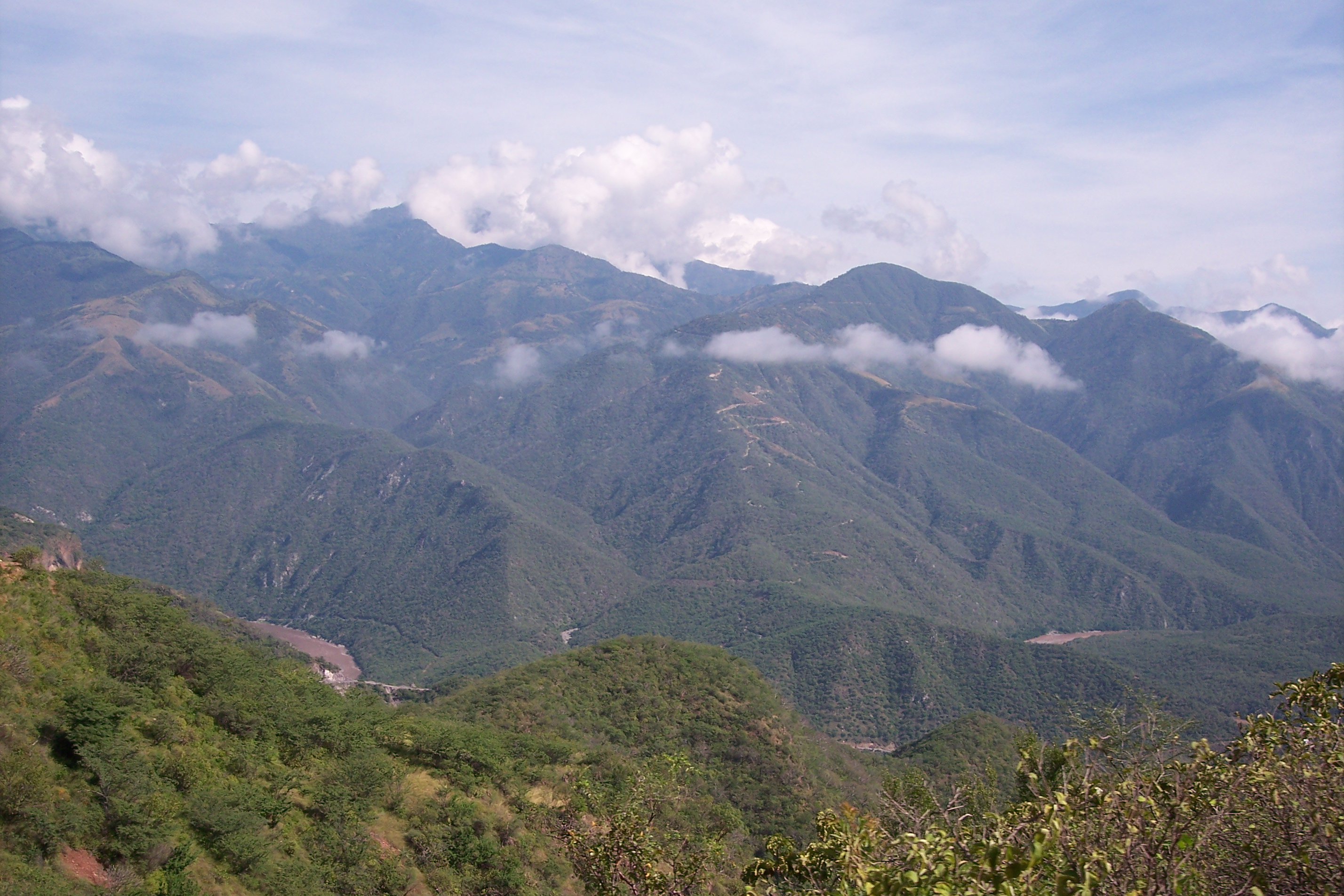
Sierra Madre Occidental pine-oak forests

The mountains create a diverse setting for plants and animals by creating a different set of conditions from the surroundings. The Sierra Madre Occidental pine-oak forests are found at elevations of 1,500–3,000 m (4,900–9,800 ft) throughout the range, but the forests in the mountains vary by elevation and place in the range. This ecoregion is noted for its high biodiversity and large number of endemic species, and for allowing some species to extend their range.

=== Flora ===
The dominant plants vary across the range, and the habitat that they present varies from scattered woodland to both deciduous and coniferous forest.

The elevation and latitude in the range are the major determining factors in the dominant plants. Oaks dominate the lower reaches of the mountains, where stands grow down to about 1,000 m (3,300 ft). Some oak species even continue into the surrounding ecosystems. In the western slopes of the range, cloud forest also occurs, mostly on mid-elevation slopes with little exposure to wind or sun in the southern end of the range. At higher elevations pines begin to grow alongside the oaks, and pines begin to dominate the oaks at higher elevations. At high elevations and in the north, mixed conifer forests become the dominant ecosystem. These forests are composed primarily of pines and firs, which begin to grow at these elevations. There are also grasslands on some mountain tops, surrounded by the forest that occur in those areas.

Plants in the area typically have large responses to the change in climate with each season. Monsoon season is the largest of these effects, with leaf buds following only a few months after the rains begin. Flowering season occurs in the months preceding the summer monsoon. This is only the peak flowering season, with plants flowering throughout the year. Due to the early flowering, fruit is ripe and seeds are dispersed at the beginning of the rains. There are also areas where plants have little response to the seasons, particularly those areas that experience moist conditions, caused by the elevations. These plants may maintain leaves through times when other areas are in the dry season, during which most deciduous trees have no leaves.

=== Fauna ===
The mountains are often a corridor for species allowing more diversity in the area, by combining species from different regions. Animals typically associated with arid and mountainous habitats share the mountains with species associated with habitats further south.

There are many carnivorous and omnivorous mammals native to the area, although several are extirpated or are part of threatened populations. The Mexican wolf's range in the mountains is limited to the foothills of Durango or the animal may have been extirpated; the black bear population is small, and the Mexican grizzly bear that once resided here is confirmed extinct. Jaguars and ocelots are also now rare. On the other hand, mountain lion and bobcat are more common. On the eastern slopes there are American badger, coyote and gray fox that live across the mountains. Native ungulates include the white tailed deer, mule deer, and collared peccary. Rodents and lagomorphs include the eastern cottontail, which lives in the forests of the western slopes, cliff chipmunk, rock squirrel, Mexican fox squirrel, and various species of Cricetidae. Raccoons, hog-nosed skunk, and hooded skunk live in the mountains. The white-nosed coati lives on the western slopes, and the ring-tailed cat lives throughout. Many species of bats live in the mountains also.

A variety of lizards live in the area and surroundings. The Tarahumara frog lives in the oak and pine stands preferring moving water to pools. The southern extent of the Sonoran mountain kingsnake's range is the Chihuahuan desert into the mountains. Other snakes and frogs live in the mountains, and many species live in the western slopes.

Birds frequent the mountains, some as a migratory path and others as native species. The migratory birds often use the area to the west as an overwintering area, and migrate north along the western slopes. In the northern canyons birds may be divided into different habitats, or more specifically, the different types of forest, leading to differences in range by elevation. Some of this difference by elevation may even extend the range of some species, enabling tropical species to use the mountain valleys for migration. Bird species endemic to the Sierra Madre Occidental include tufted jay, the "gray-eared" subspecies of red warbler, eared quetzal, thick-billed parrot, and formerly included the imperial woodpecker, which now may be extinct.

The rivers and streams of the range contain some of the southernmost trout populations in North America. These populations may be native, although this is not universally accepted. Invasive fish compete with the native species which has been a cause of concern among researchers, along with concerns about the effects of logging on these species.

=== Surroundings ===
The Sonoran Desert is found in the northwestern foothills at 1,000–2,000 m (3,300–6,600 ft). The Chihuahuan Desert is found to the northeast and east, the Meseta Central matorral and Central Mexican matorral to the southeast, and the Sinaloan dry forests to the west and southwest. These lower elevations are usually graded into by a stand of tropical deciduous forest, which has a large portion of flora made up of flowering plants and legumes. These flowering plants are mostly from the genus Bursera. The ecotone, made up of the tropical deciduous forest, is commonly sparsely populated, sometimes only by small stands of trees. It may be referred to as savanna.

=== Preservation ===
Preservation efforts in the modern day include those of Edwin Bustillos. Other groups, including Conservation International, work to protect animal species in the area. Basaseachic Falls National Park is a national park in the mountains containing the highest waterfalls in the country. Cumbres de Majalca National Park was designated in 1939. Additionally, there are reserves such as La Michilía in the southern Sierra Madre, or the Tutuaca reserve in western Chihuahua, which was established in 2000 under a new system of management. Other protected areas in the Sierra include the Bavispe, Campo Verde, Cerro Mohinora, Papigochic, and Sierra de Álamos–Río Cuchujaqui flora and fauna protection areas. The Cuenca Alimentadora del Distrito Nacional de Riego 043 Estado de Nayarit, established in 1949 to protect forests and watersheds, is now a natural resources protection area which conserves much of the southern Sierra.

== People and history ==
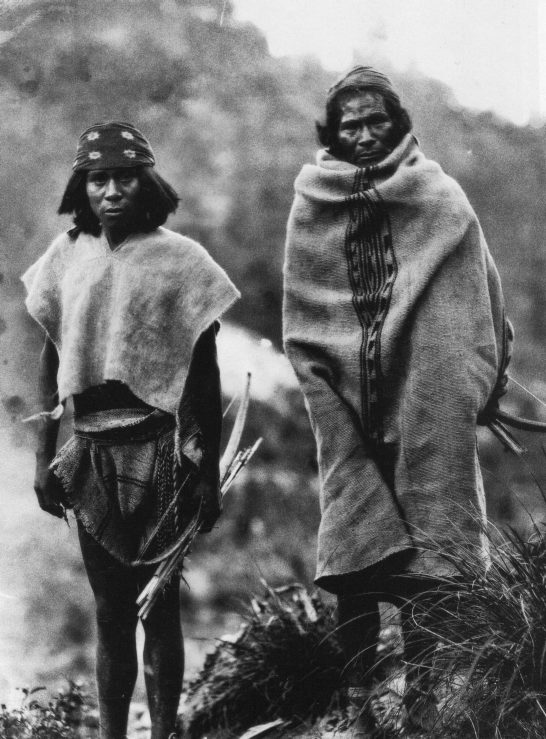
An early picture of Tarahumara

The mountains are home to several indigenous nations speaking Uto-Aztecan languages, including the Tarahumara in the central portion of the range, the Huichol in the southern part of the range, and the Tepehuanes in the eastern slopes.

=== Prehistory ===
Archaic cultures are known to have inhabited the Sierra Madre along with the rest of the surrounding lands, but little is known of the culture, although it does vary between the northern and southern extremes of the range. The agrarian Chalchihuites Culture began as farming communities around the first century AD and remained small communities until 300 AD when new agricultural techniques caused a large growth in population until around 500 AD. This culture began to decline in the ninth century. The Mogollon culture has been described in the northern foothills. Sites date the emergence of the culture to around 900 AD, and its abandonment to around 1000–1100 AD. During the period estimated for Mogollon abandonment, the Rio Sonora culture began agricultural developments along the Rio Sonora and rivers flowing into it. This culture produced pottery and lived in pit houses, until 1150 to 1200 when they began to construct surface dwellings. Construction of these houses ended around AD1550.

=== Spanish Sierra Madre ===
Francisco de Ibarra came to Durango in 1554, and began to settle the area. He would explore the western coast and cross the Sierra Madre in 1564. Early Spanish influence in the area came from the new silver mines, the first of which was established in 1567 at Santa Barbara. As sites opened for mining, missionaries came to the areas and had a strong presence by 1595. The first meeting with the Tarahumara came in 1607, when a missionary went up the valley to meet them. Opposition to the missionaries built up, leading to the Tepehuán Revolt. This revolt began in 1616 in the town of Santa Catarina de Tepehuanes in Durango, and lasted for two years. The discovery of silver at Parral in 1631 led to the northern limit of settlement moving into Tarahumara lands.

The Jesuits renewed missionary activity in the 1630s, with a new program that increased in scope until around 1650. Tarahumara moved further into the mountains in order to escape the conditions. A smallpox epidemic caused a revolt in 1645. A revolt arose in 1648, primarily among the Tarahumara. A drought caused a pair of revolutions in 1650 and 1652. The last major revolt began in March 1690 among the Tarahumara and ended in 1698. Demands from labor drafts increased in the 1720s, placing a new pressure on missions. Criticism of the Jesuits rose in the 1730s with complaints of Jesuit Commerce, which was established by mission stores. In 1767, Jesuits were expelled from New Spain, ending the mission program.

A new colonial official, José de Gálvez, came to New Spain and established new laws that caused a boom in silver mining activity in the 1770s. After the Apache faced heightened resistance to raiding from the Spanish in Chihuahuan, they moved down to the Sierra Madre in 1794. By 1800, raiding had essentially ended.

=== Mexican Sierra Madre ===
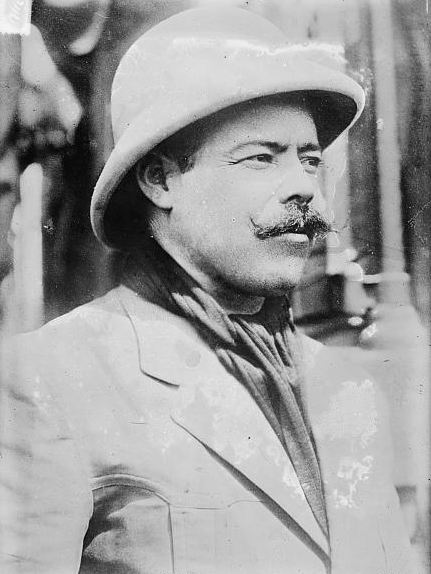
Pancho Villa

After leaving San Carlos in the fall of 1881, Geronimo and other Apache moved to the mountains, and became known as the Nednai, sometimes referred to as the "Pinery Apache" or "Bronco Apache". From there they raided Sonora and the surrounding land until General George Crook entered the mountains in 1883 to discuss Geronimo's return. Geronimo eventually surrendered in 1886. Pancho Villa fled to the mountains in 1894, becoming a bandit.

==== 19th century ====
Railroads came to the area starting in the 1880s and 1890s, which allowed many old mines in the region to reopen at a profit. Since most of the railroads were American, the foreign influence led to unrest among the people living in the mountains, causing the Tomochic rebellion in 1892. In addition to the railroads, canals were constructed in the 1890s in the Yaqui and Mayo river valleys. These canal projects failed, however, owing to the resistance that the natives of the valleys put up against the projects. Loggers began arriving in the mountains in the late 1800s. In response to the new industry, the Tarahumara moved further into the canyons.

==== 20th century ====
The 1910 revolution began in Chihuahua and spread over the mountains throughout the winter of 1910–1911. Silver mines were forced to make payments to the rebels, but were allowed to continue operating. General John J. Pershing began to follow Pancho Villa in 1916 and entered the mountains; however, he received no information from the local population. The raids subsided by 1919, and Villa returned peacefully to the foothills.

In order to construct irrigation projects in the lowlands below the valleys, irrigation projects were never completed in the Sonoran hills; instead, the Yaqui River was dammed in the 1930s. Dams continued to be constructed in the 1940s and 1950s on the Yaqui River and its tributaries with the largest reservoir, behind the Álvaro Obregón Dam completed in 1952. Dams were also constructed on the Mayo river. Because of the dams, soil condition deteriorated, and more work was required to improve soil quality. The mountain range was crossed by the Ferrocarril Chihuahua al Pacifico railroad, completed in 1961. The railroad went up for sale in 1996, but no transaction was ever completed.

==== World War II and opium cultivation for morphine ====
During World War II, the United States experienced shortages of medical morphine after opium supplies from Asia were disrupted by the Pacific War. In response, Mexican authorities, in cooperation with U.S. officials, expanded regulated opium poppy cultivation in northwestern Mexico, including rural areas surrounding Culiacán in the state of Sinaloa. Farmers in the mountainous regions of Sierra Madre Occidental, near the city of Culiacán, produced opium that was processed into legal morphine for wartime medical use by Allied forces. Although the program ended after 1945, the agricultural knowledge, smuggling routes, and local intermediary networks developed during the wartime period persisted. Historians and criminologists have identified these postwar networks as an early foundation for later illicit drug trafficking organizations in Sinaloa.

== See also ==
- List of birds of the Sierra Madre Occidental
- Sierra Madre
- Sierra Madre Occidental pine-oak forests
- Sierra Madre Oriental
