= San Pedro Mezquital River =

River in Mexico

Río San Pedro Mezquital Río San Pedro
- Location of mouth

Location
- Country: Mexico
- State: Nayarit, Durango

Physical characteristics
- Mouth
  - location: Pacific Ocean
  - coordinates: 21°56′22″N 105°21′01″W
- Length: 540 km (340 mi)
- Basin size: 27,674 km^{2}

The San Pedro Mezquital River (Spanish: Río San Pedro Mezquital) is a river of Nayarit, Mexico.

The river originates in the Sierra Madre Occidental, and flows through Durango and Nayarit states to empty into the Pacific Ocean in Marismas Nacionales Biosphere Reserve.

== Fish ==
A few fish species are native to the San Pedro Mezquital River. Among these are the two surviving Characodon splitfin species, which are both highly threatened. The extinct Durango shiner (Notropis aulidion) was native to the Rio Tunal, which forms the headwaters of the San Pedro Mezquital, a Pacific slope river rising near Durango City, Durango, Mexico (Chernoff and Miller 1986). It was taken there only in 1951 and 1961.

== See also ==
- List of rivers of Mexico
