= Sierra Madre Oriental pine–oak forests =

Temperate broadleaf and mixed forests ecoregion of Mexico and the United States

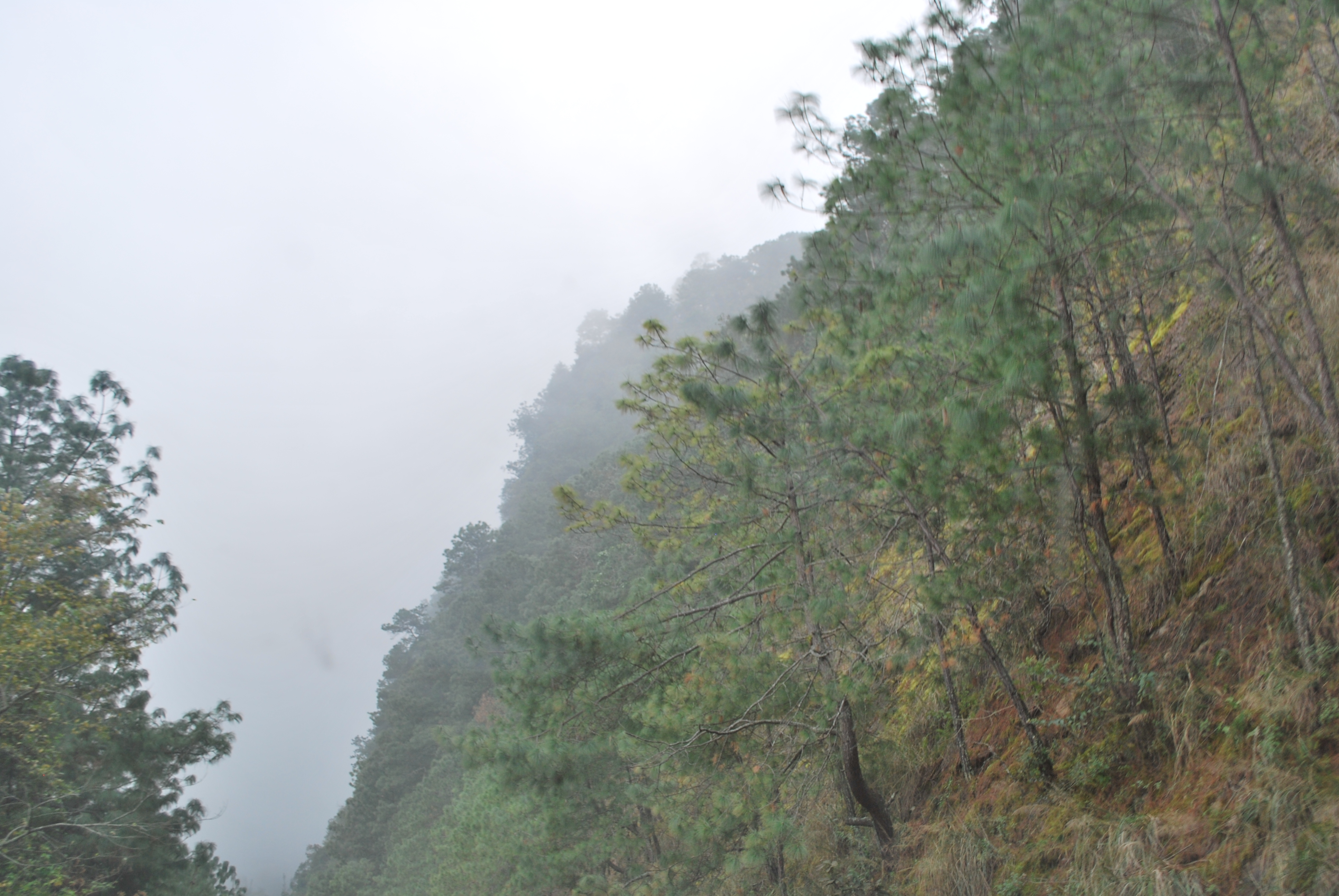
- Pahuatlán del Valle, Puebla state, Mexico

- Location of the ecoregion

Ecology
- Realm: Nearctic
- Biome: Temperate broadleaf and mixed forests
- Borders: List: Chihuahuan Desert; Tamaulipan mezquital; Tamaulipan matorral; Veracruz moist forests; Veracruz montane forests; Trans-Mexican Volcanic Belt pine–oak forests; Central Mexican matorral; Meseta Central matorral
- Bird species: 336
- Mammal species: 169

Geography
- Area: 65,600 km^{2} (25,300 sq mi)
- Countries: Mexico; United States
- States: List: Chihuahua; Coahuila; Durango; Hidalgo; Nuevo León; Puebla; Querétaro; San Luis Potosí; Tamaulipas; Texas; Veracruz; Zacatecas

Conservation
- Conservation status: Critical/endangered
- Global 200: Yes
- Habitat loss: 7.6452%
- Protected: 32.22%

The Sierra Madre Oriental pine–oak forests are a temperate broadleaf and mixed forest ecoregion of northeastern and Central Mexico, extending into the state of Texas in the United States.

== Setting ==
The Sierra Madre Oriental pine–oak forests are found at elevations of 1,000–3,500 m (3,300–11,500 ft) above sea level in the Sierra Madre Oriental range, which runs north and south between the Gulf Coastal Plain to the east along the Gulf of Mexico, and the Mexican Plateau to the west. They are also found in the Sierra Norte de Puebla, adjacent to the southern Sierra Madre Oriental. The ecoregion covers an area of 65,600 km^{2} (25,300 sq mi).

The southernmost forests transition to the Trans-Mexican Volcanic Belt pine–oak forests in central Puebla state, near the southern end of the Sierra Madre Oriental. The forests extend almost continuously along the range through the states of Veracruz, Hidalgo, Querétaro, Guanajuato, San Luis Potosí, Tamaulipas, Nuevo León, and northern Puebla. North of Monterrey, the forests become discontinuous, extending as a series of sky islands through the states of Nuevo León and Coahuila, and on into the Chisos and Davis mountains of the Big Bend region of western Texas. Just across the Rio Grande from the Big Bend is the Sierra del Carmen.

Other sky islands can be found on the higher peaks of the mountain ranges rising from the Mexican Plateau to the west. The pine–oak forests extend along a discontinuous line of folded mountains, including the Sierra de Arteaga, Sierra de Zapalinamé, Sierra La Concordia, Sierra de Parras, and Sierra de Jimulco that reach westwards across the plateau. The Sierra del Rosario, west of Torreón, is the westernmost extent of the ecoregion.

Enclaves of pine–oak forest also occur at the highest elevations of the Sierra de San Carlos and Sierra de Tamaulipas, smaller ranges which rise from the Gulf Coastal Plain east of the main line of the Sierra.

== Flora ==
The dominant species are many species of pine including Nelson pinyon (Pinus nelsonii), Mexican pinyon (P. cembroides), smooth-bark Mexican pine (P. pseudostrobus), and Arizona pine (P. arizonica), and the oaks Quercus castanea and Q. affinis. On the wetter slopes facing the ocean the most common trees are Mexican pinyon and Juniperus deppeana, while on the drier western slopes weeping pinyon (Pinus pinceana) is more common. The forests are home to a great variety of other flora including agave and traditional food plants.

The Sierra Madre Oriental is home to Mexico's greatest diversity of oaks. There are 55 native species, including 19 endemic species. 32 are red oaks (section Lobatae), of which 14 are endemic, and 23 are white oaks (section Quercus), with 5 endemic species. Endemic species include Quercus ariifolia, Q. edwardsiae, Q. flocculenta, Q. furfuracea, Q. galeanensis, Q. hirtifolia, Q. hypoxantha, Q. miquihuanensis, Q. runcinatifolia, Q. rysophylla, Q.saltillensis, and Q. verde. Quercus canbyi is native to the northern Sierra, with an outlier population in the Chisos Mountains of Texas. Quercus germana and Q. pinnativenulosa are endemic to the Sierra Madre Oriental and the northern Sierra Madre de Oaxaca. Several species, including Quercus laeta and Q. xalapensis, reach northern limits of their ranges in the Sierra.

== Fauna ==
Mammals that inhabit this ecoregion include the American black bear (Ursus americanus), which migrate along the Rio Grande from northern Coahuila to the Chisos Mountains in Texas, mule deer (Odocoileus hemionus), cougar (Puma concolor), cliff chipmunk (Tamias dorsalis), collared peccary (Pecari tajacu), white-nosed coati (Nasua narica), jaguar (Panthera onca) and coyote (Canis latrans).

The maroon-fronted parrot (Rhynchopsitta terrisi) is endemic to this ecoregion. The Colima warbler (Vermivora crissalis) breeds only in the Sierra Madre Oriental. Wild turkeys (Meleagris gallapavo), peregrine falcons (Falco peregrinus) and golden eagle (Aquila chrysaetos) are also resident.

Pine–oak forests in Coahuila are part of the migration route of monarch butterflies (Danaus plexippus).

== Protected areas ==
32.22% of the ecoregion is in protected areas. Protected areas include El Chico National Park, El Potosí National Park, Cumbres de Monterrey National Park Los Mármoles National Park, Big Bend National Park, Cerro de la Silla Natural Monument, El Cielo Biosphere Reserve, Sierra de Tamaulipas Biosphere Reserve, Sierra Gorda Biosphere Reserve, Sierra Gorda de Guanajuato Biosphere Reserve, Barranca de Metztitlán Biosphere Reserve, Maderas del Carmen Flora and Fauna Protection Area, Cañón de Santa Elena Flora and Fauna Protection Area, Sierra de Álvarez Flora and Fauna Protection Area, Serranía de Zapalinamé ecological reserve, Cuenca Alimentadora del Distrito Nacional de Riego 026 Bajo Río San Juan, and Cuenca Alimentadora del Distrito Nacional de Riego 004 Don Martín.

== See also ==
- List of ecoregions in Mexico
- List of ecoregions in the United States (WWF)
- Conifers of Mexico
