= Oaxacan montane forests =

Ecoregion in Mexico

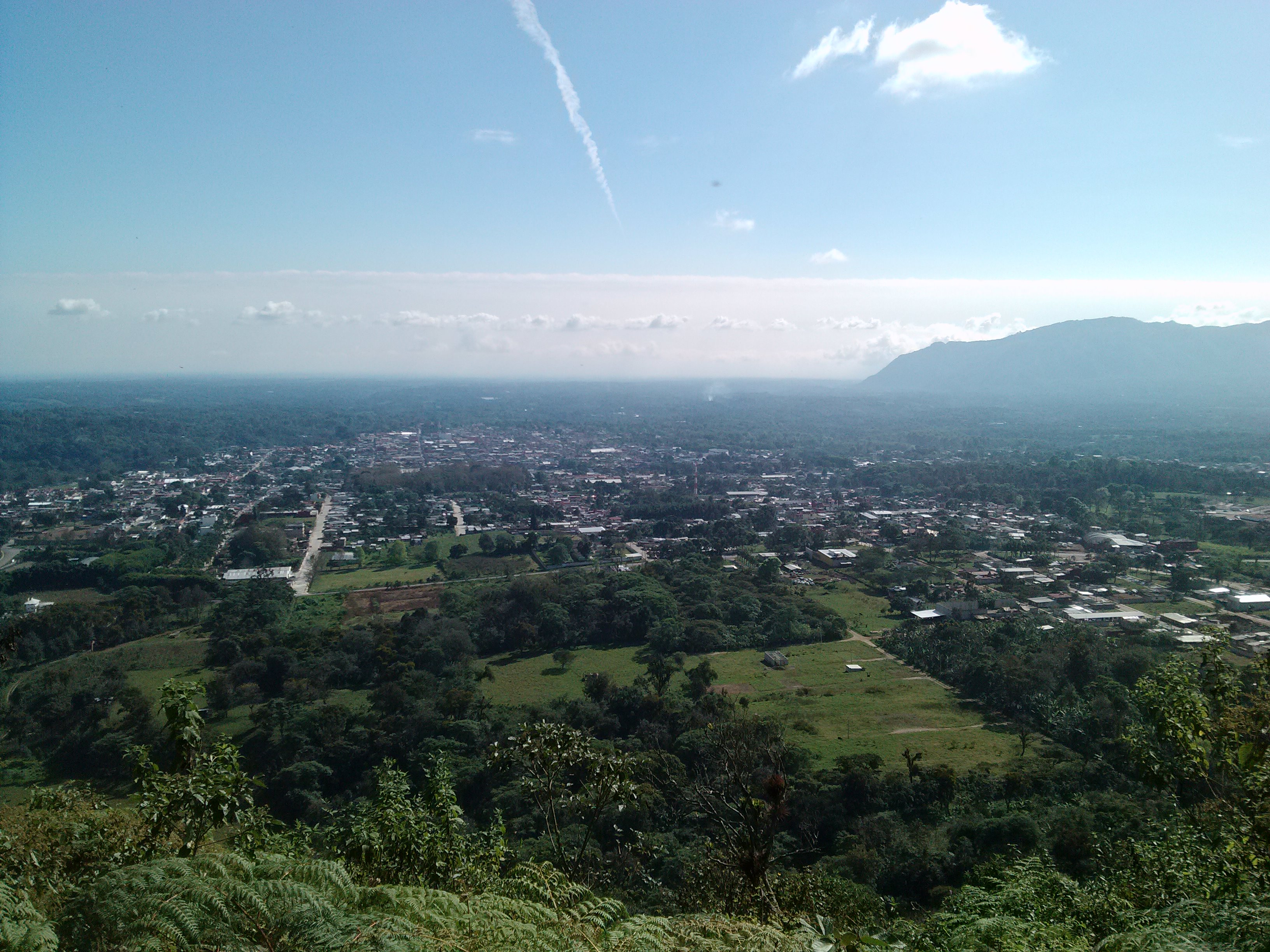
- City of Huatusco, Veracruz

- Location of the Oaxacan montane forests ecoregion

Ecology
- Realm: Neotropical
- Biome: tropical and subtropical moist broadleaf forests
- Borders: Petén–Veracruz moist forests; Sierra Madre de Oaxaca pine–oak forests; Trans-Mexican Volcanic Belt pine–oak forests, Veracruz moist forests

Geography
- Area: 7,577 km^{2} (2,925 mi^{2})
- Country: Mexico
- States: Oaxaca; Puebla; Veracruz

Conservation
- Conservation status: Critical/endangered
- Protected: 219 km^{2} (3%)

The Oaxacan montane forests is a tropical moist broadleaf forest ecoregion in eastern Mexico. It includes a belt of montane tropical forest on the eastern slope of the Sierra Madre de Oaxaca and eastern Trans-Mexican Volcanic Belt ranges. These forests lie between the lowland Petén–Veracruz moist forests and Veracruz moist forests, and the pine–oak forests of the higher mountains.

== Geography ==
The Oaxacan montane forests extend along eastern mountain slopes of Puebla, Veracruz and Oaxaca states. The ecoregion extends from the Tecolutla River in the north across the Sierra de Chiconquiaco, the eastern Trans-Mexican Volcanic Belt, and the Sierra Madre de Oaxaca.

== Climate ==
The climate of the ecoregion ranges from tropical to temperate depending on the elevation. The ecoregion is humid throughout the year, and temperatures remain mild, with mean annual temperature ranging from 19 °C to 17 °C, decreasing with elevation. There are three seasons: a cool season from November to March, a short warm-dry season in April and May, and a warm wet season from June to October.

== Flora ==
The predominant vegetation in the ecoregion is tropical montane cloud forest. The forests of the ecoregion show a great diversity in species composition and structure which vary with microclimate, elevation, and underlying soils. Epiphytes, including mosses, orchids, and ferns, are abundant.

The forests include species with origins in both temperate North America (Nearctic) and the tropical Americas (Neotropical), with high percentage (30 to 35%) of endemic species. Forest canopy trees are principally of Nearctic origin, while the subcanopy and understory species include species shared with the lowland tropics, the Andean forests of South America, and eastern Asia.

Tree species found on volcanic soils include Carpinus tropicalis, Cinnamomum effusum, Clethra macrophylla, Hedyosmum mexicanum, Liquidambar styraciflua, Myrsine coriacea, Quercus cortesii, Quercus germana, Quercus lancifolia, Quercus sartorii, Quercus xalapensis, Styrax glabrescens, Turpinia insignis, and Zanthoxylum melanostictum.

Trees on limestone-derived soils include Arachnothryx capitellata, Cercis canadensis, Clusia guatemalensis, Cojoba arborea, Eugenia mexicana, Garrya laurifolia, Gymnanthes riparia, Oreopanax liebmannii, Oreopanax xalapensis, Ostrya virginiana, Quercus pinnativenulosa, Turpinia insignis, Wimmeria concolor, and Zanthoxylum petenense.

== Fauna ==
The ecoregion has 323 species of birds. The Bearded wood partridge (Dendrortyx barbatus) inhabits this ecoregion and the Veracruz montane forests.

The ecoregion has 185 species of mammals, and 161 species of lizards and snakes.

== Protected areas ==
A 2017 assessment found that about 45% of the ecoregion is still forested. 219 km^{2}, or 3%, of the ecoregion is in protected areas. Protected areas include Cañón del Río Blanco National Park, Cerro La Galaxia Ecological Conservation Area, Cerro de las Culebras, La Martinica, and Pancho Poza ecological reserves, Río Filo-Bobos y su Entorno protected area, and the San Antonio del Barrio, Santiago Tlatepusco, La Tierra del Faisán, San Juan Teponaxtla, Santo Domingo Cacalotepec, and Nopalera del Rosario voluntary conservation areas.

== See also ==
- List of ecoregions in Mexico
