= Live oak =

Group of evergreen trees in the oak genus Quercus

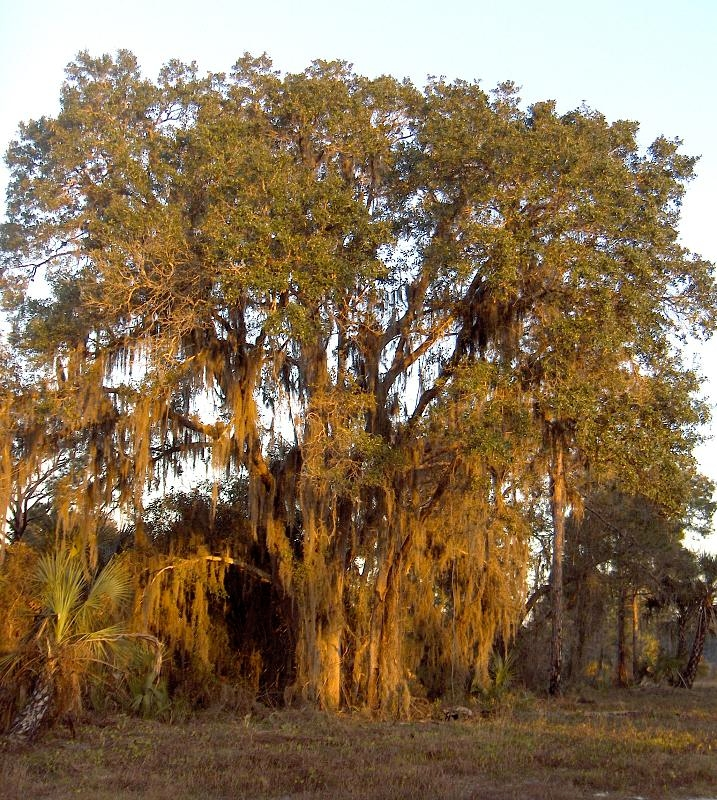
Sand live oak (Quercus geminata) with Spanish moss (Tillandsia usneoides) growing on its branches

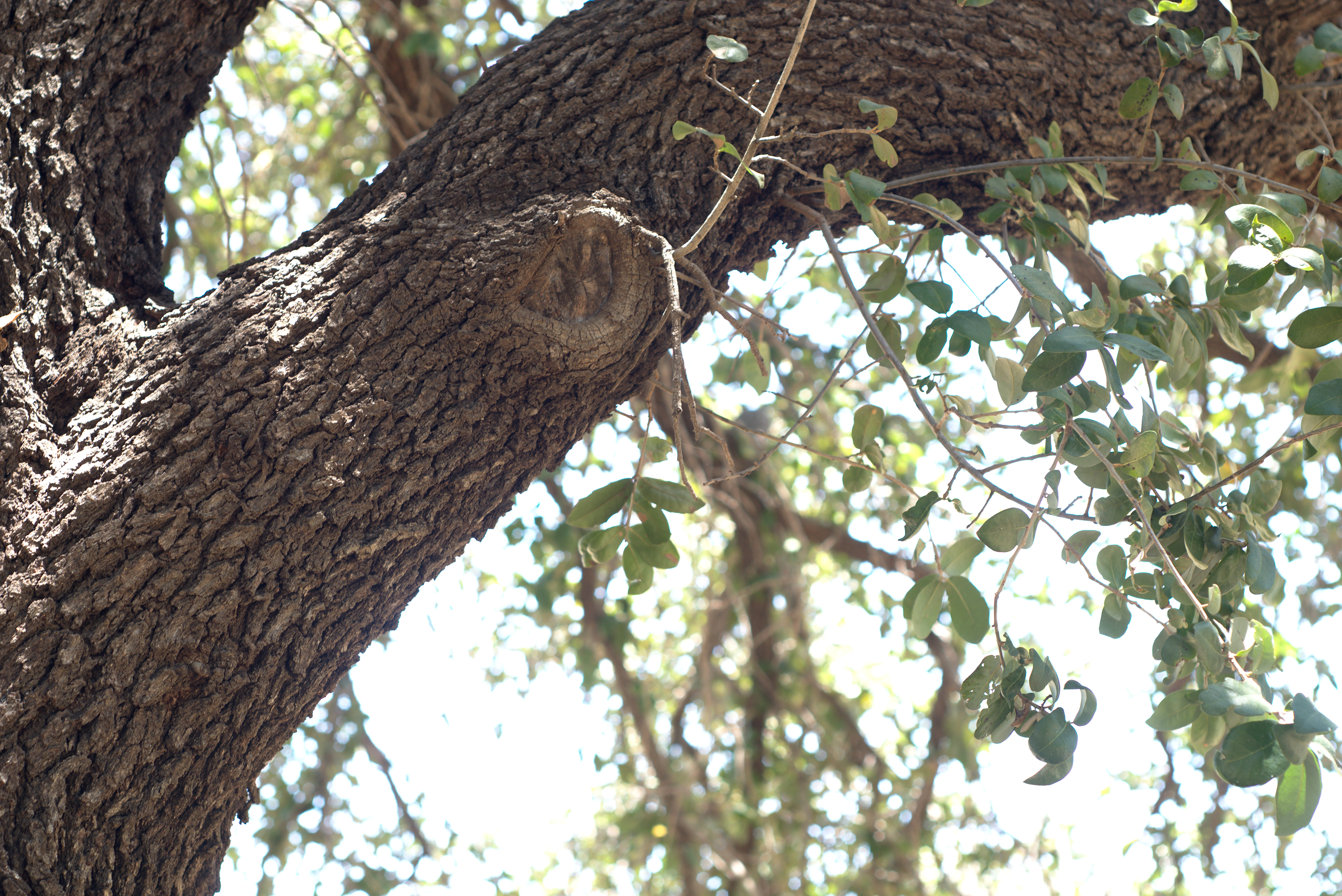
Texas live oak (Quercus fusiformis)

Live oak or evergreen oak is any of a number of oaks in several different sections of the genus Quercus that share the characteristic of evergreen foliage. These oaks are generally not more closely related to each other than they are to other oaks. When the term live oak is used in a specific rather than general sense, it most commonly refers to the group of species under Quercus sect. Virentes, which includes the southern live oak (Quercus virginiana), the first species so named, and an icon of the Old South.

The name live oak comes from the fact that evergreen oaks remain green and "live" throughout winter, when other oaks are dormant and leafless. The name is used mainly in North America, where evergreen oaks are widespread in warmer areas along the Atlantic coast from southeast Virginia to Florida, west along the Gulf Coast to Louisiana and Mexico, and across the southwest to California.

Evergreen oak species are also common in parts of southern Europe and south Asia, and are included in this list for the sake of completeness. These species, although not having "live" in their common names in their countries of origin, are colloquially called live oaks when cultivated in North America.

According to the Live Oak Society the oldest southern live oak is believed to be the Seven Sisters Oak located in Mandeville, Louisiana with an estimated age of 500–1,000 years.

The southern live oak is the official state tree of Georgia (U.S. state).

The Seal of Texas includes a live oak branch.

A small grove of live oaks on a prairie is known as a mott.

Walt Whitman writes in his poem "I saw in Louisiana a live-oak growing" of a twig taken from a solitary live-oak as a token that makes him think of manly love.

== Wood and lumber ==
Live oak was widely used in early American shipbuilding. Because of the trees' short height and low-hanging branches, lumber from live oaks was used in curved parts of the frame, such as knee braces (single-piece, L-shaped braces that spring inward from the side and support the deck), in which the grain runs perpendicular to structural stress, making for exceptional strength. Live oaks were not generally used for planking because the curved and often convoluted shape of the tree did not lend itself to being milled to planking of any length. "The world's oldest floating ship, the USS Constitution, launched in 1797, got its nickname "Old Ironsides" during the War of 1812 after its hull, made in part of live oak, proved equal to the fearsome cannons of the British".

Loggers had cut down most of the live oak trees in southern Europe by the latter half of the 19th century. Live oak timber from the United States was similarly sought and exported until metal-hulled commercial vessels became the norm in the early part of the 20th century. Live oak lumber is rarely used for furniture, because it warps and twists while drying.

The wood of live oaks continues to be used occasionally in shipbuilding—and in tool handles for its strength, energy absorption, and density, although modern composites are often substituted with good effect. Dry southern live oak lumber has a specific gravity of 0.88, among the highest of North American hardwoods.

== List of evergreen species in genus Quercus ==
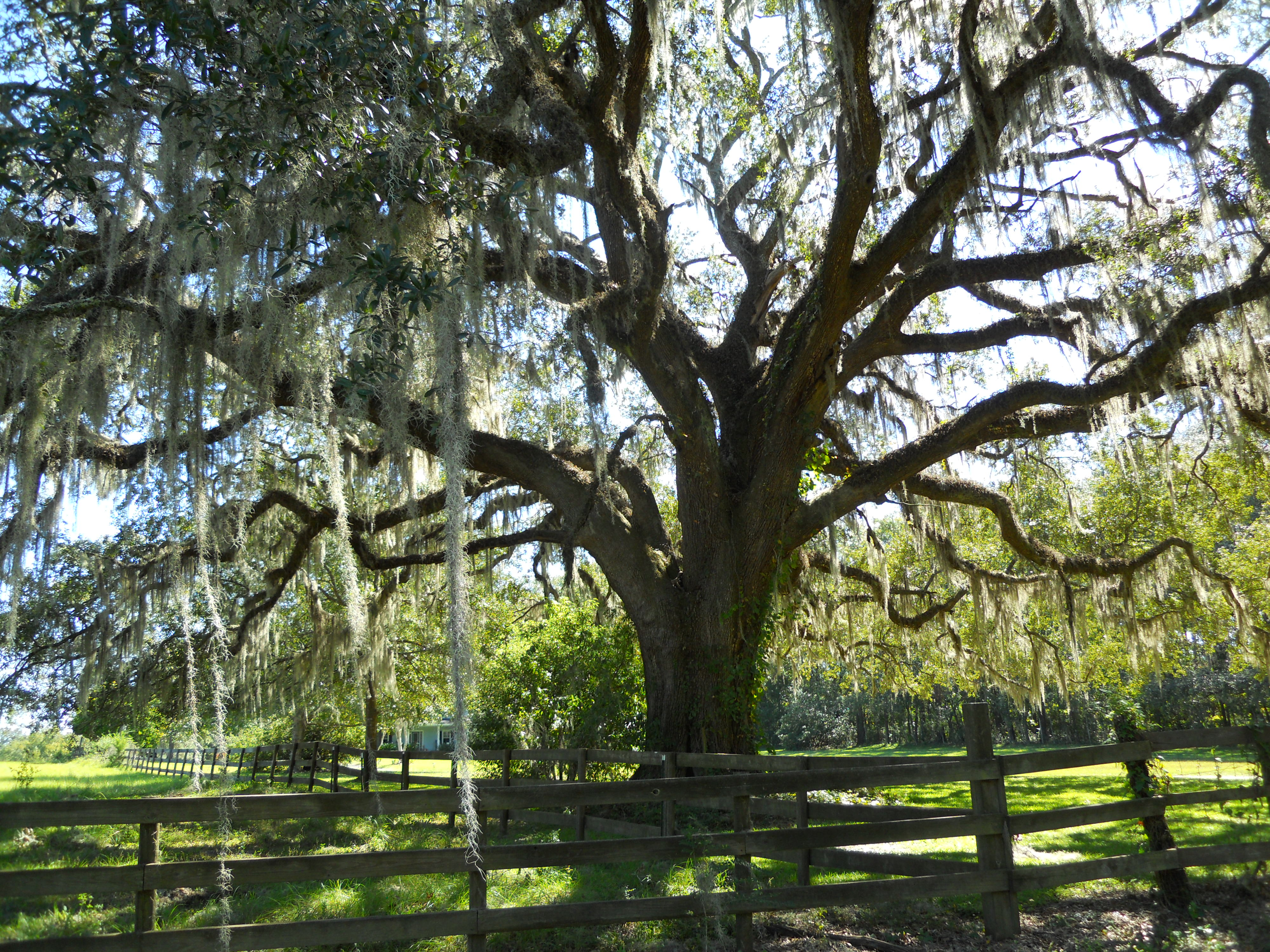
A mature live oak in Florida

- Section Quercus. The white oaks – Europe, Asia, North Africa, North America, styles short; acorns mature in six months, sweet or slightly bitter, inside of acorn shell is hairless
  - Quercus arizonica – Arizona white oak – southwestern North America
  - Quercus fusiformis – (also Quercus virginiana var. fusiformis) Texas live oak – south central North America
  - Quercus geminata – sand live oak – southeastern North America
  - Quercus greggii – Gregg oak – Mexico
  - Quercus hinckleyi – Hinckley oak – Mexico & Texas
  - Quercus ilex – Holm oak – southern Europe
  - Quercus minima – dwarf live oak – southeastern North America
  - Quercus oblongifolia – Mexican blue oak – southwestern North America
  - Quercus polymorpha – Mexican white oak or Monterrey oak – Mexico
  - Quercus pungens – sandpaper oak – south central North America
  - Quercus rotundifolia − holm oak − southwestern Europe and northwestern Africa
  - Quercus turbinella – shrub live oak – southwestern North America
  - Quercus virginiana – southern live oak – southeastern North America
- Section Cerris. Europe, Asia, north Africa. Styles long; acorns mature in 18 months, very bitter, inside of acorn shell is hairless or slightly hairy
  - Quercus calliprinos – Palestine oak – western Asia
  - Quercus coccifera – Kermes oak – southern Europe
  - Quercus semecarpifolia – Himalayan oak – eastern Asia
  - Quercus suber – Cork oak – southwestern Europe
- Section Protobalanus – Southwest US, California coastal ranges and northwest Mexico, styles short, acorns mature in 18 months, very bitter, inside of acorn shell is woolly
  - Quercus cedrosensis — Cedros Island oak — Baja California
  - Quercus chrysolepis – canyon live oak – southwestern North America, especially coastal ranges of California
  - Quercus palmeri – Palmer oak – southwestern North America
  - Quercus tomentella – Channel Island oak – Channel Islands of California
  - Quercus vacciniifolia – huckleberry oak – California and southwestern North America
- Section Lobatae. The red oaks – North, Central and South America, styles long, acorns mature in 18 months, very bitter, inside of acorn shell is woolly
  - Quercus agrifolia – coast live and sharpacorn oaks – California and Mexico
  - Quercus canbyi – Canby oak – Mexico
  - Quercus emoryi – Emory oak – southwestern North America
  - Quercus hemisphaerica – laurel oak – southeastern North America
  - Quercus humboldtii – South American oak – northern South America
  - Quercus laurifolia – swamp laurel oak – southeastern U.S.
  - Quercus hypoleucoides – silverleaf oak – southwestern North America
  - Quercus parvula – Santa Cruz Island and Shreve oaks – California
  - Quercus rysophylla – loquat leaf oak – Mexico
  - Quercus wislizeni – interior live oak – California and Mexico

- See the list of Quercus species for a fuller listing of oaks, including deciduous species.
