= Quercus furfuracea =

Conservation status
- Vulnerable (IUCN 3.1)

Scientific classification
- Kingdom: Plantae
- Clade: Embryophytes
- Clade: Tracheophytes
- Clade: Spermatophytes
- Clade: Angiosperms
- Clade: Eudicots
- Clade: Rosids
- Order: Fagales
- Family: Fagaceae
- Genus: Quercus
- Subgenus: Quercus subg. Quercus
- Section: Quercus sect. Lobatae
- Species: Q. furfuracea

Binomial name
- Quercus furfuracea Liebm.

Synonyms
- Quercus acutifolia var. furfuracea (Liebm.) Oerst.

Species of oak tree

Quercus furfuracea is a species of oak native to eastern Mexico.

== Description ==
Quercus furfuracea is a shrub or small tree, which grows to 3 to 6 meters tall.

The species belongs to the Quercus acutifolia group of species. The species of this group are characterized by lanceolate to elliptical leaves which are glabrous on both surfaces, with a dentate-aristate margin, and some clustered trichomes in the axils of the veins.

== Range and habitat ==
Quercus furfuracea is native to the Sierra Madre Oriental, in the states of Puebla, Hidalgo, and San Luis Potosí. It is a rare species, occupying only a few locations across its range. It has an estimated extent of occurrence (EOO) of 18,575 km^{2}, and an estimated area of occupancy (AOO) of 60 km^{2}. The area of occupancy is likely an under-estimate, due to under-sampling.

It inhabits montane oak forests, pine-oak forests, and cloud forests from 710 to 1,975 meters elevation. It is typically found on limestone soils, associated with Quercus affinis, Q. calophylla, Q. germana, Q. mexicana, Q. polymorpha, and Pinus patula.

== Conservation and threats ==
The species is threatened with habitat loss, from deforestation of its native forests for timber, conversion to agriculture and livestock pasture.

The species' conservation status is assessed as vulnerable.
