= Los Mármoles National Park =

National park in Mexico

- IUCN category II (national park)
- Location within Mexico
- Location: Hidalgo, Mexico
- Nearest town: Zimapán
- Coordinates: 20°52′07″N 99°12′44″W
- Area: 231.5 km^{2} (89.4 sq mi)
- Designation: National park
- Designated: 1936
- Administrator: National Commission of Natural Protected Areas

Los Mármoles National Park is a protected natural area in northeastern Mexico. It is located in the western Sierra Madre Oriental of northern Hidalgo.

== Geography ==
The national park has an area of 231.5 km^{2}. It is located in the municipality of Zimapán, northeast of the town.

The park lies between the Sierra Gorda and the Sierra de Pachuca, and is part of a chain of mountains that extend north–south to the west of the main chain of the Sierra Madre. The highest peak in the park is Cerro Cangando at 3,000 meters elevation. The lowest elevations are in the Barranca San Vicente, a ravine which descends to 600 meters elevation and drains into the Moctezuma River.

The climate is temperate subhumid across most of the park, and semiwarm subhumid at lower elevations. Summer is the rainy season, with average annual rainfall ranging from 1500 mm to 450 mm in the driest areas. The park is mostly in the rain shadow of the Sierra Madre Oriental.

== Flora and fauna ==
The main plant communities in the park are pine forest and oak forest, with areas of pine–oak forest, juniper forest and woodland, and dry (xeric) scrubland. Oak forests occur at mid-elevations, and the predominant species are Quercus crassifolia, Quercus laeta, Quercus mexicana, and Quercus affinis. The pine forests are of two main types, a Pinus cembroides–Juniperus deppeana association, and the other consisting of Pinus greggii, Pinus teocote, Pinus patula, and Pinus pseudostrobus. Xeric scrub is found in the low ravines, and common plants include Acacia berlandieri, Caesalpinia mexicana, Dalea bicolor, Karwinskia humboldtiana, Mimosa aculeaticarpa, and Senna racemosa.

There are is a rich diversity of oaks in the park, with 18 native species. The most common are Quercus affinis, Quercus crassifolia, Quercus laeta, and Quercus mexicana.

The park is home to 11 species of bats, and is considered an important site in Mexico for bat conservation. Species include the common vampire bat (Desmodus rotundus), Aztec fruit-eating bat (Dermanura azteca), lesser long-nosed bat (Leptonycteris yerbabuenae), California myotis (Myotis californicus), southwestern myotis (Myotis auriculus), hoary bat (Aeorestes cinereus), and desert red bat (Lasiurus blossevillii). Other native mammals include the ringtail (Bassariscus astutus). Native birds include the white-eared hummingbird (Basilinna leucotis). Native reptiles include the lagarto alicante del Popocatepetl (Barisia imbricata) and the spiny lizard Sceloporus minor.

== Conservation ==
Los Mármoles was declared a national park in 1936 by President Lázaro Cárdenas.
