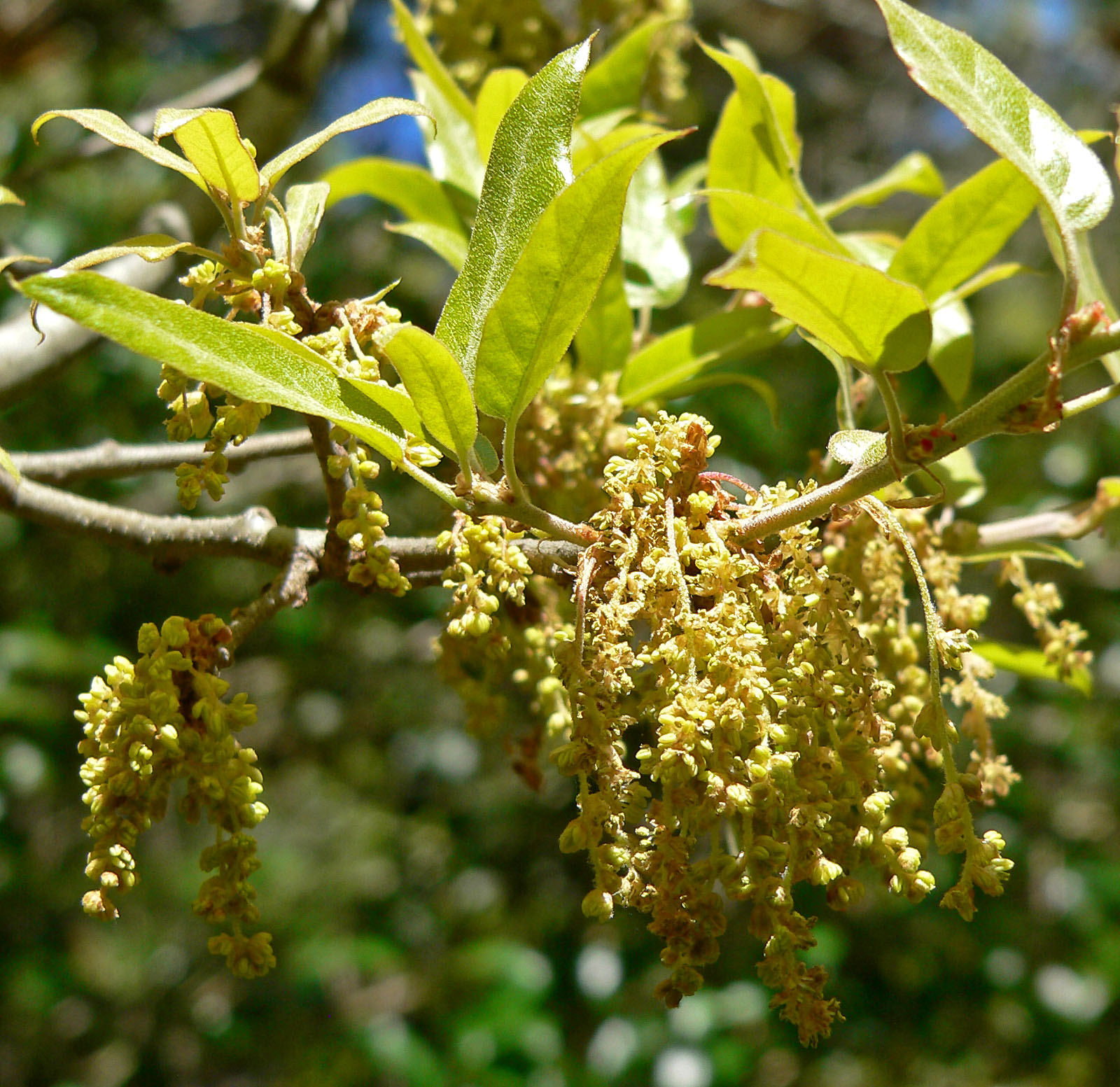

Conservation status
- Near Threatened (IUCN 3.1)

Scientific classification
- Kingdom: Plantae
- Clade: Embryophytes
- Clade: Tracheophytes
- Clade: Spermatophytes
- Clade: Angiosperms
- Clade: Eudicots
- Clade: Rosids
- Order: Fagales
- Family: Fagaceae
- Genus: Quercus
- Subgenus: Quercus subg. Quercus
- Section: Quercus sect. Lobatae
- Species: Q. saltillensis

Binomial name
- Quercus saltillensis Trel.

Synonyms
- Quercus carnerosana Trel.

= Quercus saltillensis =

Species of oak tree

Quercus saltillensis is a species of oak. It is native to northeastern Mexico. It is placed in Quercus section Lobatae.

== Description ==
Quercus saltillensis is a shrub or small tree, growing from one to five meters tall.

== Range and habitat ==
Quercus saltillensis is native to the mountains of northeastern Mexico in the states of Coahuila, Nuevo León, San Luis Potosí, Tamaulipas, and Zacatecas. It is found in the northern Sierra Madre Oriental of Nuevo León, Tamaulipas, and Coahuila, and in several ranges which rise from the Mexican Plateau east of the Sierra Madre Oriental, including the sierras de Arteaga, la Concordia, Parras, Carneros, Zapalinamé, and la Paila in Coahuila, the Sierra de Astillero in Zacatecas, and El Águila hill in San Luis Potosí.

Quercus saltillensis is found in mountain forests and shrublands between 1,900 and 2,400 meters elevation, in pine-oak and oak forests and in the transition between pine-oak and fir forest. It is associated with Pinus cembroides, P. pseudostrobus, Pseudotsuga menziesii var. lindleyana, Cupressus arizonica, Quercus hintoniorum, Q. mexicana, Q. greggii, Q. laeta, Q. striatula, Juniperus flaccida, J. pinchotii, Prunus serotina, Ceanothus buxifolius, Juglans microcarpa, and Arctostaphylos pungens. On southern and southeastern slopes it can be found with some species of the Agavaceae family. At the edges of pine–oak and fir forests and on drier slopes it grows as a shrub, while in humid areas it can grow into a small tree.
