= Quercus aculcingensis =

Scientific classification
- Kingdom: Plantae
- Clade: Tracheophytes
- Clade: Angiosperms
- Clade: Eudicots
- Clade: Rosids
- Order: Fagales
- Family: Fagaceae
- Genus: Quercus
- Subgenus: Quercus subg. Quercus
- Section: Quercus sect. Quercus
- Species: Q. aculcingensis

Binomial name
- Quercus aculcingensis Trel.

Synonyms
- Quercus reticulata var. crassifolia Oerst.; Quercus reticulata var. retifolia Liebm.

Species of oak tree

Quercus aculcingensis is a species of oak endemic to eastern Mexico.

It is a shrub, growing up to 3 meters tall and occasionally to 5 meters. It grows in the northern Sierra Madre de Oaxaca of Veracruz state, at 2,200 meters elevation. It is named for the town of Acultzingo.

Some authorities treat the species as a synonym of Quercus greggii.
