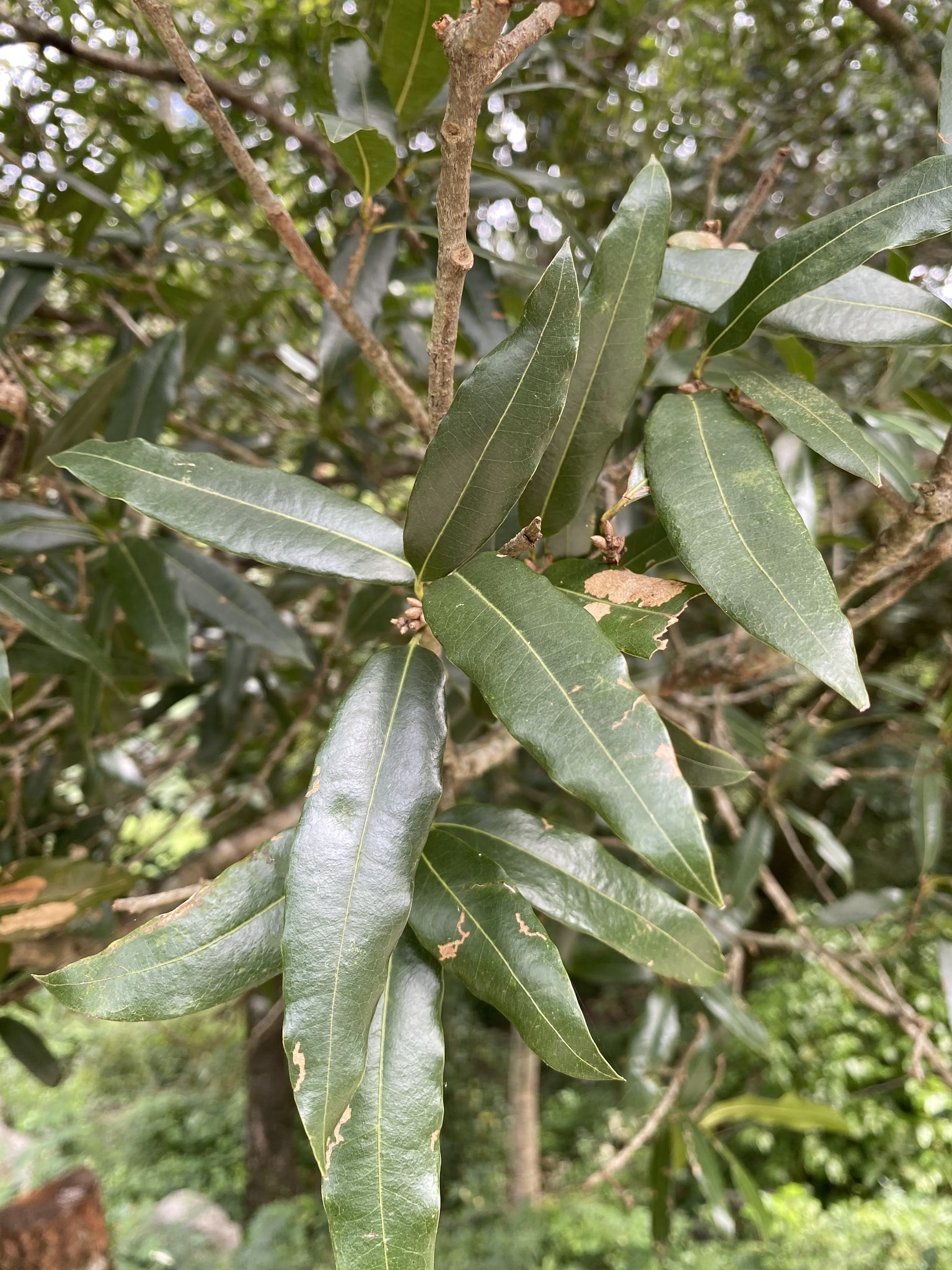

Conservation status
- Near Threatened (IUCN 3.1)

Scientific classification
- Kingdom: Plantae
- Clade: Embryophytes
- Clade: Tracheophytes
- Clade: Spermatophytes
- Clade: Angiosperms
- Clade: Eudicots
- Clade: Rosids
- Order: Fagales
- Family: Fagaceae
- Genus: Quercus
- Subgenus: Quercus subg. Quercus
- Section: Quercus sect. Lobatae
- Species: Q. pinnativenulosa

Binomial name
- Quercus pinnativenulosa C.H.Mull.

= Quercus pinnativenulosa =

Species of oak tree

Quercus pinnativenulosa is a species of oak endemic to Mexico.

== Description ==
Quercus pinnativenulosa is a tree which grows from 10 to 15 meters tall, and occasionally to 20 meters.

The species is part of the Quercus laurina group of oaks from Mexico and Central America, which share many similarities and are often confused with one another. They have lanceolate leaves, with a pointed and bristled apex. The upper and lower leaf surfaces are glabrous, or retain only some clustered trichomes in the axils of the secondary veins.

== Range and habitat ==
Quercus pinnativenulosa is endemic to Mexico. It inhabits the Sierra Madre Oriental and northern Sierra Madre de Oaxaca, in the states of Nuevo León, Tamaulipas, Querétaro, San Luis Potosí, Hidalgo, Veracruz, Puebla, and Oaxaca.

The species grows in pine–oak forest, oak forest, and cloud forest (montane mesophytic forest) from 800 to 1,600 meters elevation. It is frequently associated with Liquidambar styraciflua, Quercus affinis, Quercus polymorpha, Ostrya virginiana, Cornus excelsa, Eugenia xalapensis, and Carpinus tropicalis.

Subpopulations tend to be small and scattered. Its area of occupancy (AOO) is unlikely to exceed 700 km^{2}. The species is threatened with habitat loss from frequent fires, livestock grazing, and logging.
