= Quercus acherdophylla =

Conservation status
- Data Deficient (IUCN 3.1)

Scientific classification
- Kingdom: Plantae
- Clade: Embryophytes
- Clade: Tracheophytes
- Clade: Spermatophytes
- Clade: Angiosperms
- Clade: Eudicots
- Clade: Rosids
- Order: Fagales
- Family: Fagaceae
- Genus: Quercus
- Subgenus: Quercus subg. Quercus
- Section: Quercus sect. Lobatae
- Species: Q. acherdophylla

Binomial name
- Quercus acherdophylla Trel.

Species of oak tree

Quercus acherdophylla is a species of oak native to Mexico.

== Description ==
Quercus acherdophylla is typically a medium-sized evergreen tree, up to 25 metres (82 ft) tall. Its appearance is similar to Quercus laurina, particularly its leaf size. The acorns of Q. acherdophylla mature annually, in contrast to the biennial acorn maturation of Q. laurina.

== Range and habitat ==
Quercus acherdophylla lives in cloud forests along the eastern slopes of the southern Sierra Madre Oriental and easternmost Trans-Mexican Volcanic Belt in the states of Hidalgo, Puebla, and Veracruz, extending into the northern Sierra Madre de Oaxaca of northernmost Oaxaca state.

It inhabits very humid ravines between 1,800 and 2,500 metres (5,900 and 8,200 ft) elevation. Its population can be sparse in portions of its range. It is a dominant species on mountain ridges in the Sierra Madre de Oaxaca of Huautla de Jiménez, Oaxaca.

The population of Q. acherdophylla has been little studied.
