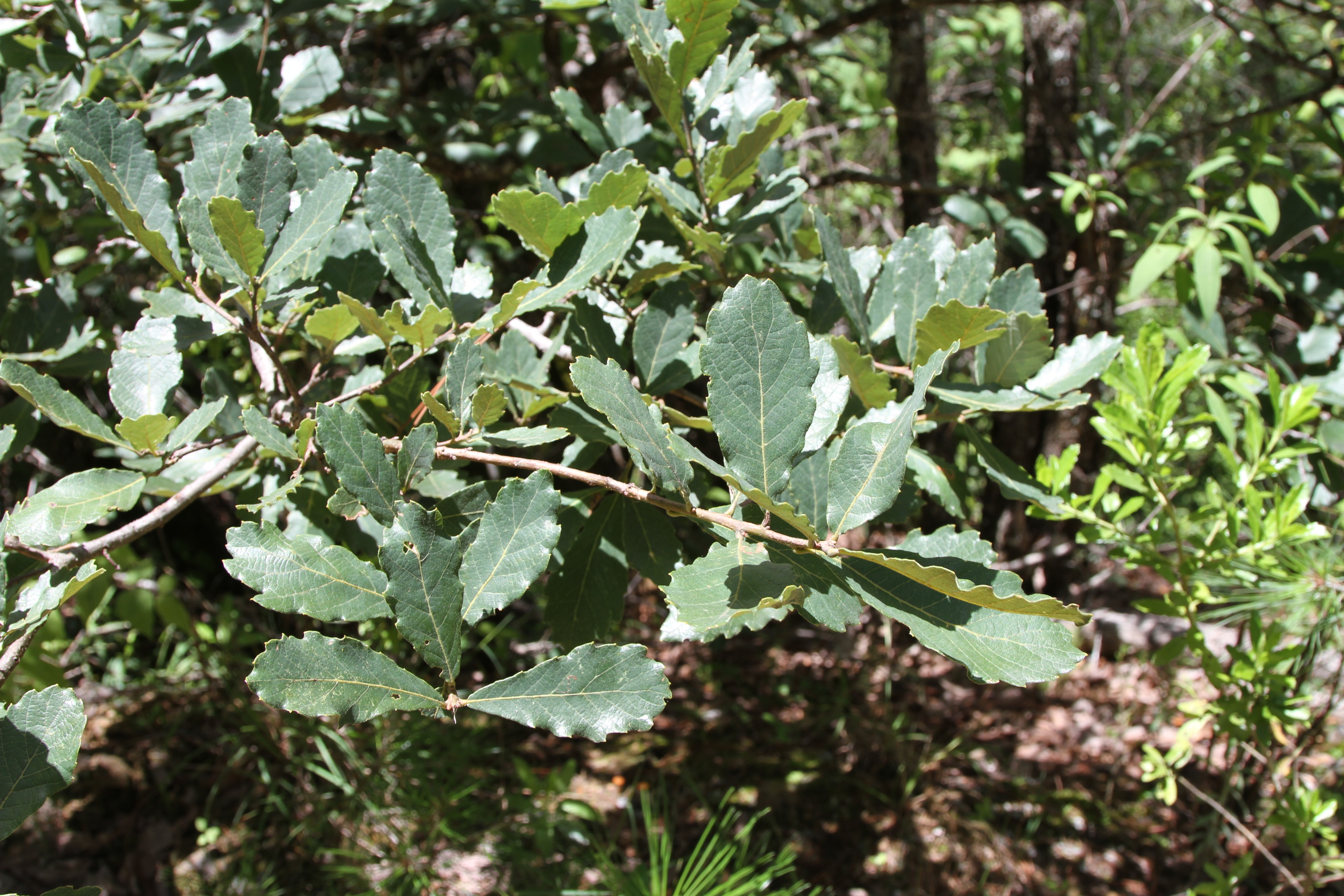

Conservation status
- Least Concern (IUCN 3.1)

Scientific classification
- Kingdom: Plantae
- Clade: Embryophytes
- Clade: Tracheophytes
- Clade: Spermatophytes
- Clade: Angiosperms
- Clade: Eudicots
- Clade: Rosids
- Order: Fagales
- Family: Fagaceae
- Genus: Quercus
- Subgenus: Quercus subg. Quercus
- Section: Quercus sect. Quercus
- Species: Q. glabrescens

Binomial name
- Quercus glabrescens Benth.

Synonyms
- Quercus radlkoferiana Trel.

= Quercus glabrescens =

Species of oak tree

Quercus glabrescens is a species of oak. It is endemic to the mountains of east-central Mexico.

== Description ==
It is a tree up to 15 metres (49 feet) tall with thick leathery leaves up to 11 centimetres (4 1/4 inches) long, elliptical or egg-shaped with a few wavy lobes along the edges. It is placed in Quercus section Quercus.

== Range and habitat ==
Quercus glabrescens is found in the southern Sierra Madre Oriental, eastern Trans-Mexican Volcanic Belt, and Sierra Madre de Oaxaca ranges, in the states of Mexico, Hidalgo, Puebla, Querétaro, Tlaxcala, Veracruz, and Oaxaca. Few populations are found in the Sierra de Miahuatlán and Sierra Madre del Sur of southern and western Oaxaca.

Quercus glabrescens is found mainly in mountain cloud forests, and sometimes in cold, humid conifer forests, from 2,270 to 3,000 meters elevation. It is often a dominant species where it is found, and is associated with oyamel (Abies religiosa, Quercus affinis, Q. crassifolia, and Q. rugosa.

== Conservation ==
Quercus glabrescens is locally abundant within its range. Despite some habitat loss from logging and clearing forests for pasture and farms, there no reports of decline, and the population trend is assumed to be relatively stable. The species' conservation status is Least Concern.
