= Quercus edwardsiae =

Conservation status
- Data Deficient (IUCN 3.1)

Scientific classification
- Kingdom: Plantae
- Clade: Embryophytes
- Clade: Tracheophytes
- Clade: Spermatophytes
- Clade: Angiosperms
- Clade: Eudicots
- Clade: Rosids
- Order: Fagales
- Family: Fagaceae
- Genus: Quercus
- Subgenus: Quercus subg. Quercus
- Section: Quercus sect. Quercus
- Species: Q. edwardsiae

Binomial name
- Quercus edwardsiae C.H.Mull.

Species of plant

Quercus edwardsiae is a species of oak endemic to northeastern Mexico.

== Description ==
It is closely related to Quercus porphyrogenita.

== Range and habitat ==
Quercus edwardsiae is endemic to the Sierra de Lampazos of Nuevo León state of northeastern Mexico, in the municipalities of Lampazos and Bustamante. The Sierra de Lampazos is a northern outlier of the Sierra Madre Oriental.

The species is found in oak-forested canyons between 522 and 700 meters elevation. It grows as isolated trees among other oaks.

== Conservation ==
Little is known about the population of the species. Its habitat is mostly located on private land.
