= Quercus runcinatifolia =

Conservation status
- Endangered (IUCN 3.1)

Scientific classification
- Kingdom: Plantae
- Clade: Embryophytes
- Clade: Tracheophytes
- Clade: Spermatophytes
- Clade: Angiosperms
- Clade: Eudicots
- Clade: Rosids
- Order: Fagales
- Family: Fagaceae
- Genus: Quercus
- Subgenus: Quercus subg. Quercus
- Section: Quercus sect. Lobatae
- Species: Q. runcinatifolia

Binomial name
- Quercus runcinatifolia Trel. & C.H.Mull.

Species of plant

Quercus runcinatifolia is a species of oak endemic to northeastern Mexico.

== Range and habitat ==
Quercus runcinatifolia is endemic to the northern Sierra Madre Oriental in the state of Nuevo León south of the city of Monterrey, including the Cerro de la Silla.

Its natural habitat is montane pine–oak forest.

It forms sparse and scattered subpopulations within its range. Subpopulations are often made up of 10–15 mature individuals.

The species is threatened from habitat loss from urbanization as the city of Monterrey expands, as well as livestock grazing and logging. The population is small and declining, and the species' conservation status is assessed as endangered.
