= Zimapán =

- Town and municipality
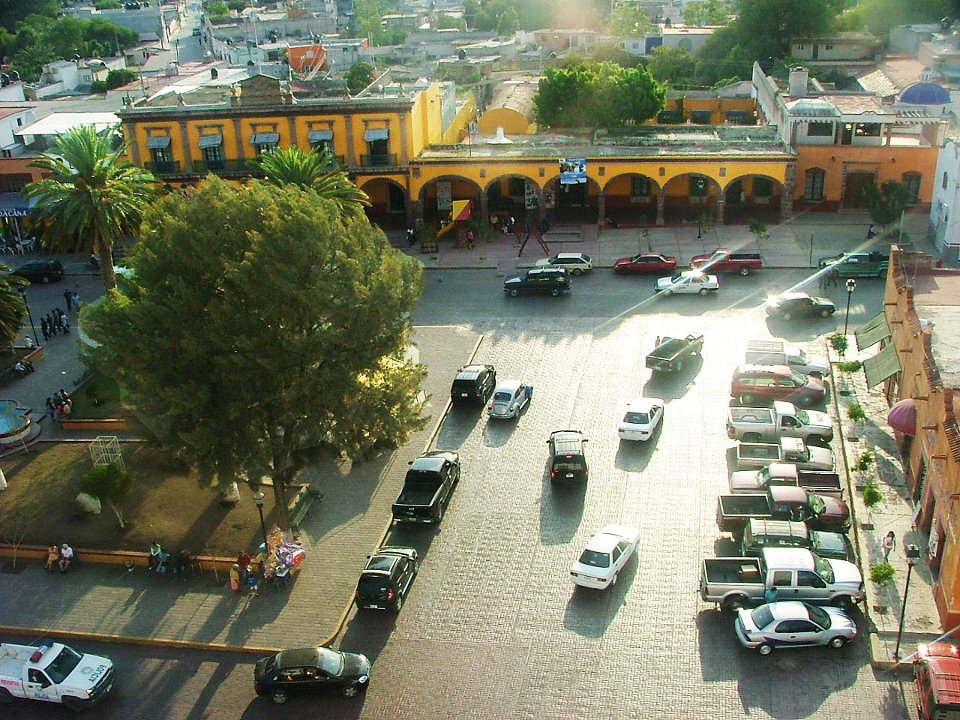
- Central Zimapán

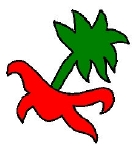
- Coat of arms
- Motto: la ciudad mágica
- Location within Hidalgo Location within Mexico
- Coordinates: 20°44′N 99°23′W
- Country: Mexico
- State: Hidalgo
- Municipality: Zimapan

Government
  - Type: PAN-PRD
  - Mayor: Alan Rivera Villanueva (2020-2024)
  - Federal electoral district: Hidalgo's 2nd

Area
  - Total: 860.9 km^{2} (332.4 sq mi)

Population (2020)
  - Total: 39,927
- Time zone: UTC-6 (Zona Centro)
- Postal code: 42330
- Area code: 754
- Website: zimapan.gob.mx

Zimapán (Otomi: Mabo̱za) is a town and one of the 84 municipalities of Hidalgo, in central-eastern Mexico. The municipality covers an area of 860.9 km^{2} (332.4 sq mi).

The name Zimapán derives from the Nahuatl words "cimatl", meaning "cimate" (a root used to ferment pulque) and "pan", meaning "inside or over"; which translates to "over the cimate" or "in the cimate".

As of 2020, the municipality had a total population of 39,927. Zimapán has a regional hospital and seven health centers. It also has 32 Casas de Salud, or health houses.

Los Mármoles National Park is located in the municipality, northeast of the town in the Sierra Madre Oriental.

== History ==
The land was place for Otomi and Quinamí indigenous people, which later received influence from Olmecs and Nahuas. In 1522, after the Conquista, Spanish colonalists founded the city of Zimapán. Augustinian friars built the first church of Zimapán in the 18th century and later they built another, which building ended in 1822.

Vanadium was discovered by first time here in 1801 by Andrés Manuel del Río. During the Mexican Revolution, General Otilio Villegas won a battle for the "Carrancistas" in Zimapán.

The city was declared a "Pueblo Mágico" in 2018.
