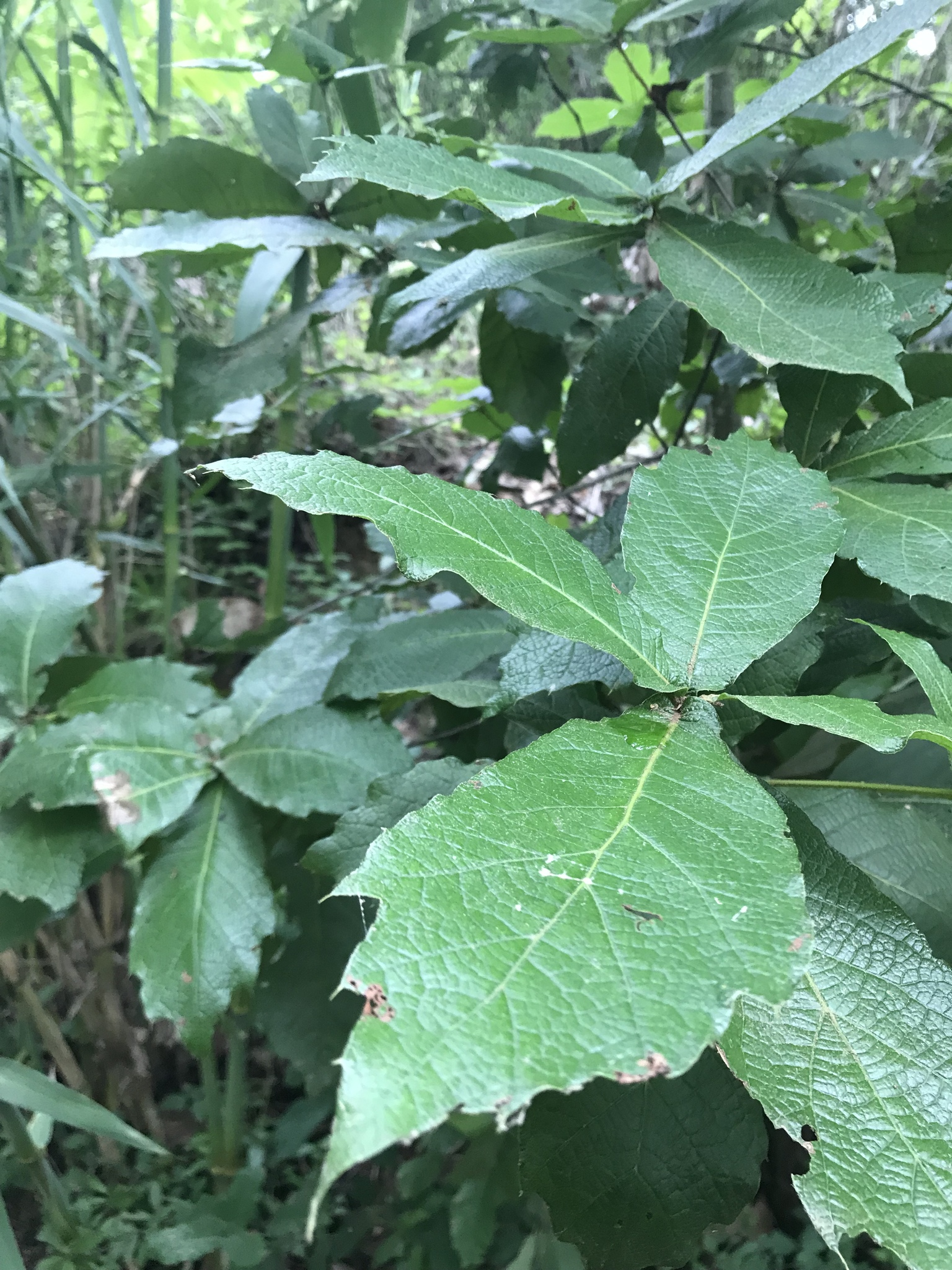

Conservation status
- Near Threatened (IUCN 3.1)

Scientific classification
- Kingdom: Plantae
- Clade: Embryophytes
- Clade: Tracheophytes
- Clade: Spermatophytes
- Clade: Angiosperms
- Clade: Eudicots
- Clade: Rosids
- Order: Fagales
- Family: Fagaceae
- Genus: Quercus
- Subgenus: Quercus subg. Quercus
- Section: Quercus sect. Lobatae
- Species: Q. rysophylla

Binomial name
- Quercus rysophylla Weath.

Synonyms
- Quercus rhysophylla Weath.

= Quercus rysophylla =

Species of oak tree

Quercus rysophylla, the loquat leaf oak, is a Mexican species of oak in the red oak section (Quercus section Lobatae). It is native to the Sierra Madre Oriental in the States of Tamaulipas, Nuevo León, San Luis Potosí, Veracruz, and Hidalgo in northeastern Mexico.

== Description ==
Quercus rysophylla is a large tree, up to 25 metres (82 feet) tall. It has smooth pale gray bark, which ages and becomes rough, deeply cracked and dark gray. The leaves are lanceolate (lance shaped), up to 21 centimetres (8 1/4 inches) long. It has acorns that are biennial, ripening the year after flowering.

== Habitat ==
It is normally found growing in humid canyons and on north facing slopes, in cloud forests and oak or oak–pine forests. It grows on limestone and igneous substrates. It is normally found from 500–1,700 m (1,600–5,600 ft) meters elevation.

The largest known population is in Cumbres de Monterrey National Park. It is also present in Sierra Gorda Biosphere Reserve.

== Taxonomy ==
It was originally published and described by Charles Alfred Weatherby in 1910.

When Weatherby published his new tree, he made an error, he spelled 'rysophylla', the specific epithet refers to the Greek term ῥυσός (rhysos) meaning wrinkled and φύλλον (phyllon) for leaf. He should have used the correct spelling rhysophylla. Some botanists and publications change the epithet to rhysophylla. Although, the Melbourne Code, states it should be uncorrected, therefore the original spelling, rysophylla, is deemed correct. Other incorrect spellings 'risophylla', 'rhizophylla' and 'rizophylla' can be found.

It gained the common name 'Loquat oak' or 'loquat-leaf oak', from the superficial resemblance of the leaves in shape and texture to those of the loquat (Eriobotrya japonica).

== Gallery ==
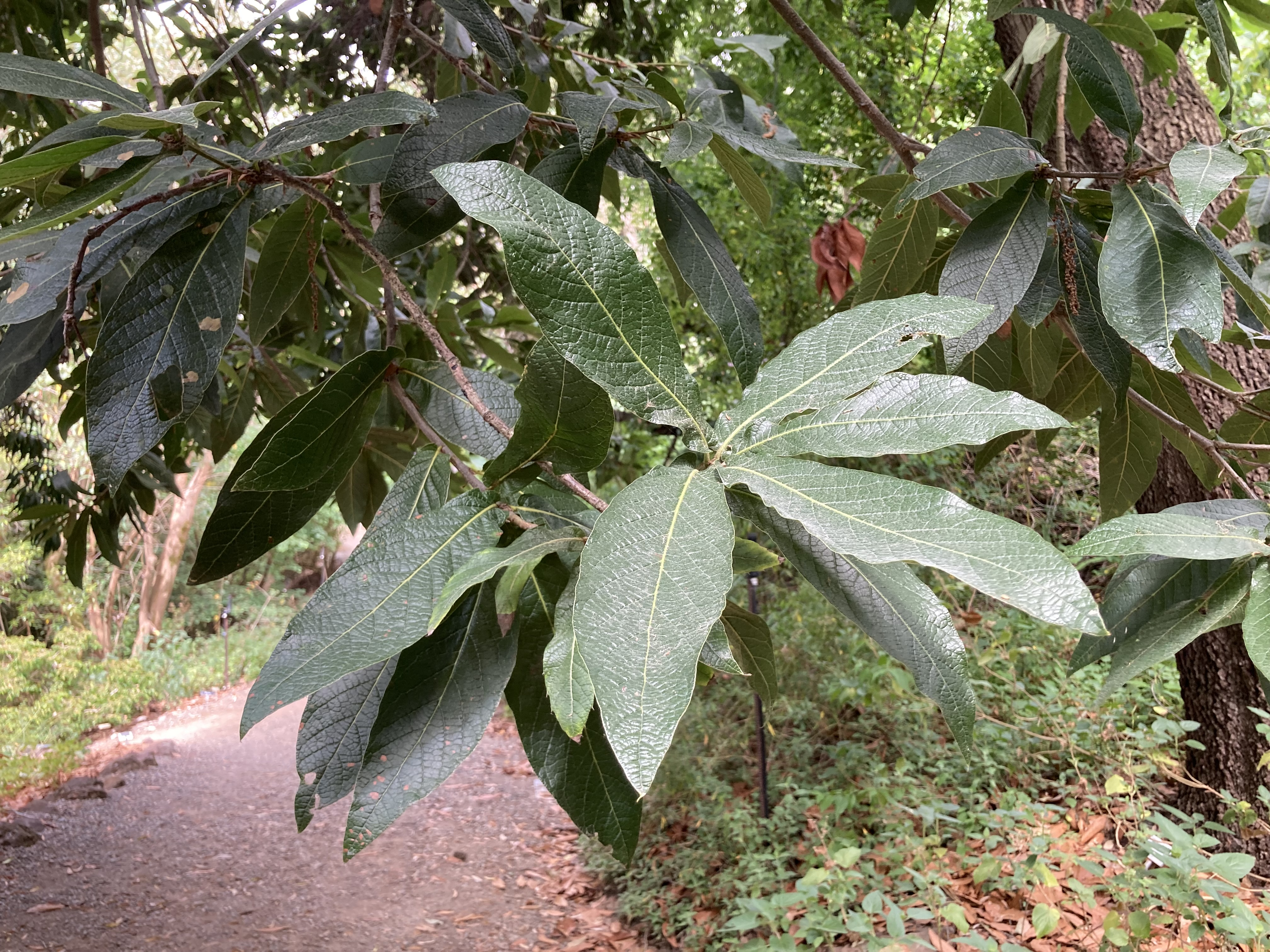
Detail of the leaves

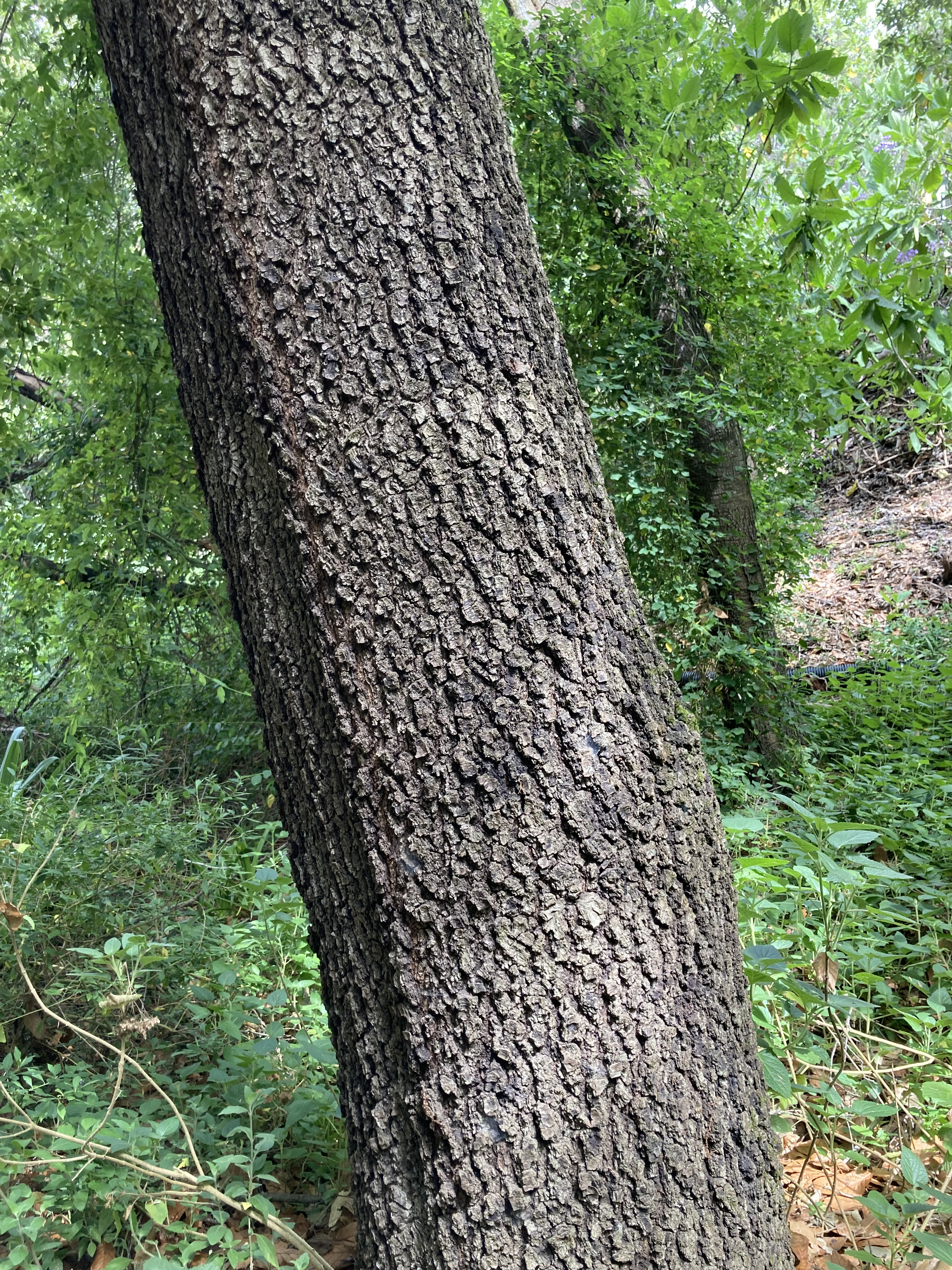
Mature bark texture

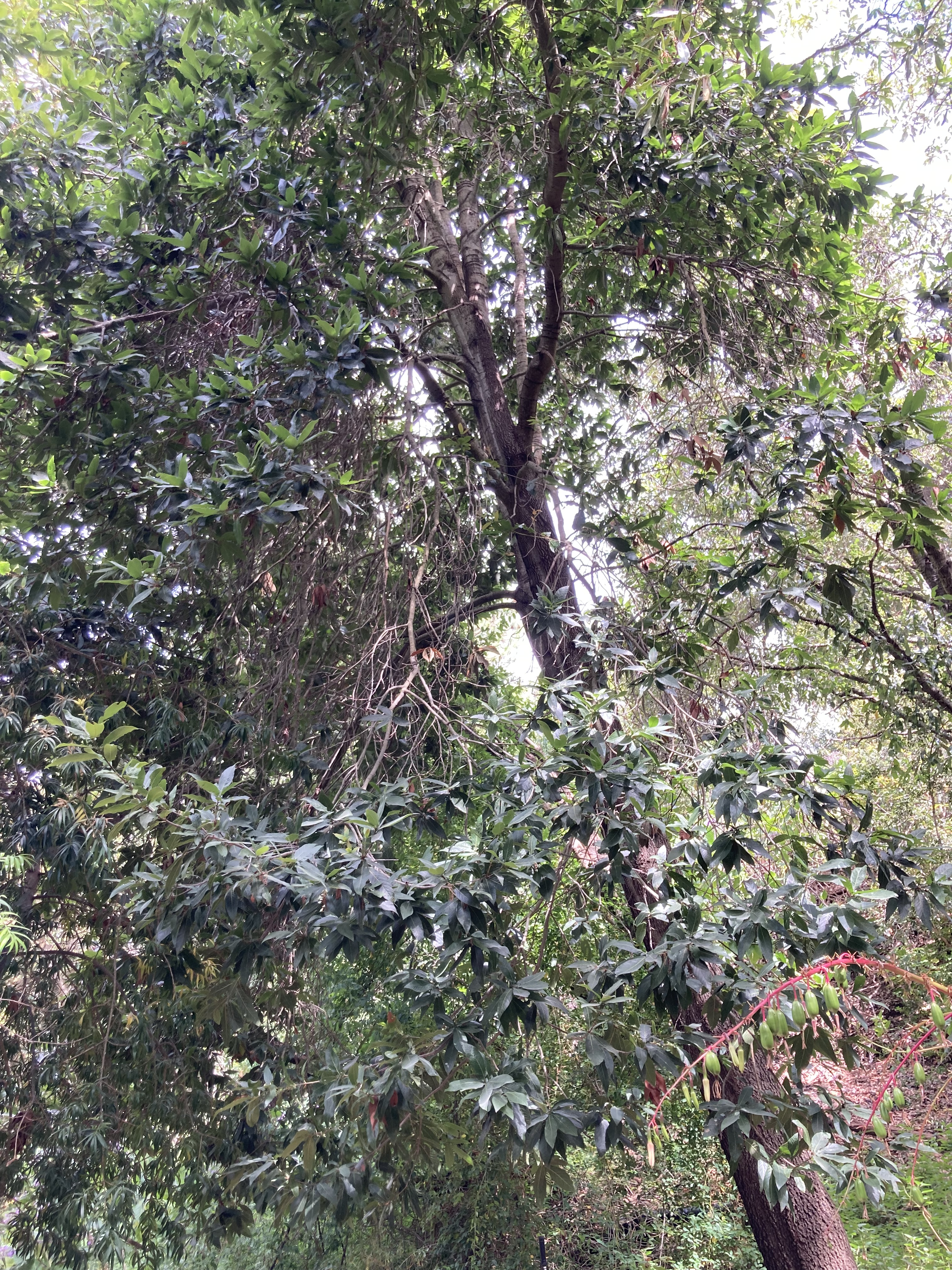
A mature specimen at UC Berkeley Botanical Garden

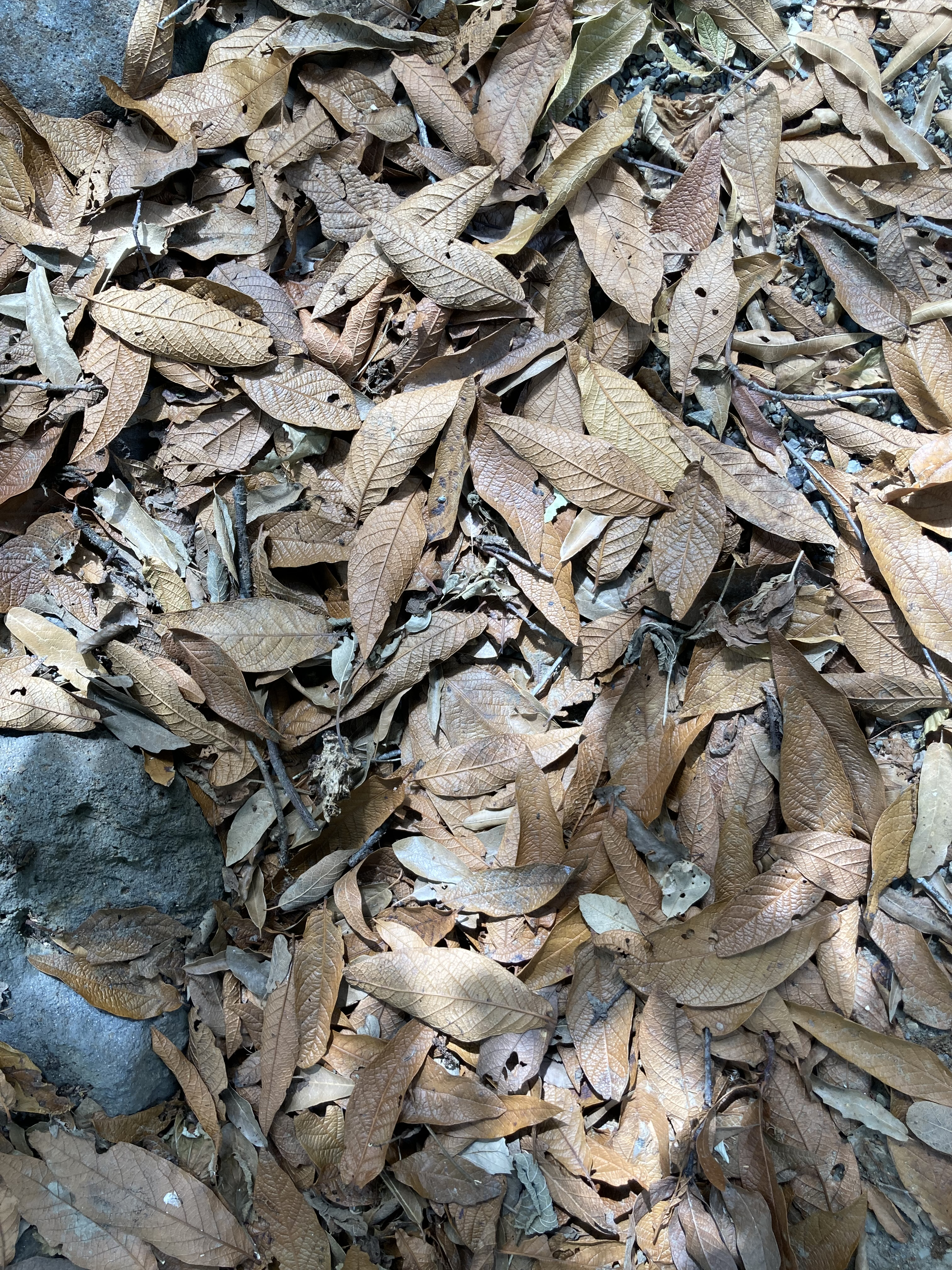
Leaf Litter of Q. rysophylla.
