= Quercus verde =

Conservation status
- Data Deficient (IUCN 3.1)

Scientific classification
- Kingdom: Plantae
- Clade: Embryophytes
- Clade: Tracheophytes
- Clade: Spermatophytes
- Clade: Angiosperms
- Clade: Eudicots
- Clade: Rosids
- Order: Fagales
- Family: Fagaceae
- Genus: Quercus
- Subgenus: Quercus subg. Quercus
- Section: Quercus sect. Quercus
- Species: Q. verde

Binomial name
- Quercus verde C.H.Mull.

Species of oak tree

Quercus verde is a species of oak endemic to northeastern Mexico.

== Description ==
Quercus verde is a shrub or small tree, growing up to 3 meters high.

== Range and habitat ==
Quercus verde is endemic to the western slope of the Sierra Madre Oriental in Nuevo León, where it is found between 2,100 and 2,500 meters elevation.

== Conservation ==
Little is known about the population of the species, or threats to it.
