= Quercus galeanensis =

Conservation status
- Endangered (IUCN 3.1)

Scientific classification
- Kingdom: Plantae
- Clade: Embryophytes
- Clade: Tracheophytes
- Clade: Spermatophytes
- Clade: Angiosperms
- Clade: Eudicots
- Clade: Rosids
- Order: Fagales
- Family: Fagaceae
- Genus: Quercus
- Subgenus: Quercus subg. Quercus
- Section: Quercus sect. Lobatae
- Species: Q. galeanensis

Binomial name
- Quercus galeanensis C.H.Mull.

Species of oak tree

Quercus galeanensis is a species of oak tree in the family Fagaceae, native to Northeastern Mexico. The tree is endemic to Mexico, restricted to two subpopulations occupying a narrow band (150 x 10–20 km) from Galeana in Nuevo León state, to the Miquihuana region in Tamaulipas state. It is an IUCN Red List endangered species, threatened by habitat loss. It is placed in section Lobatae.
