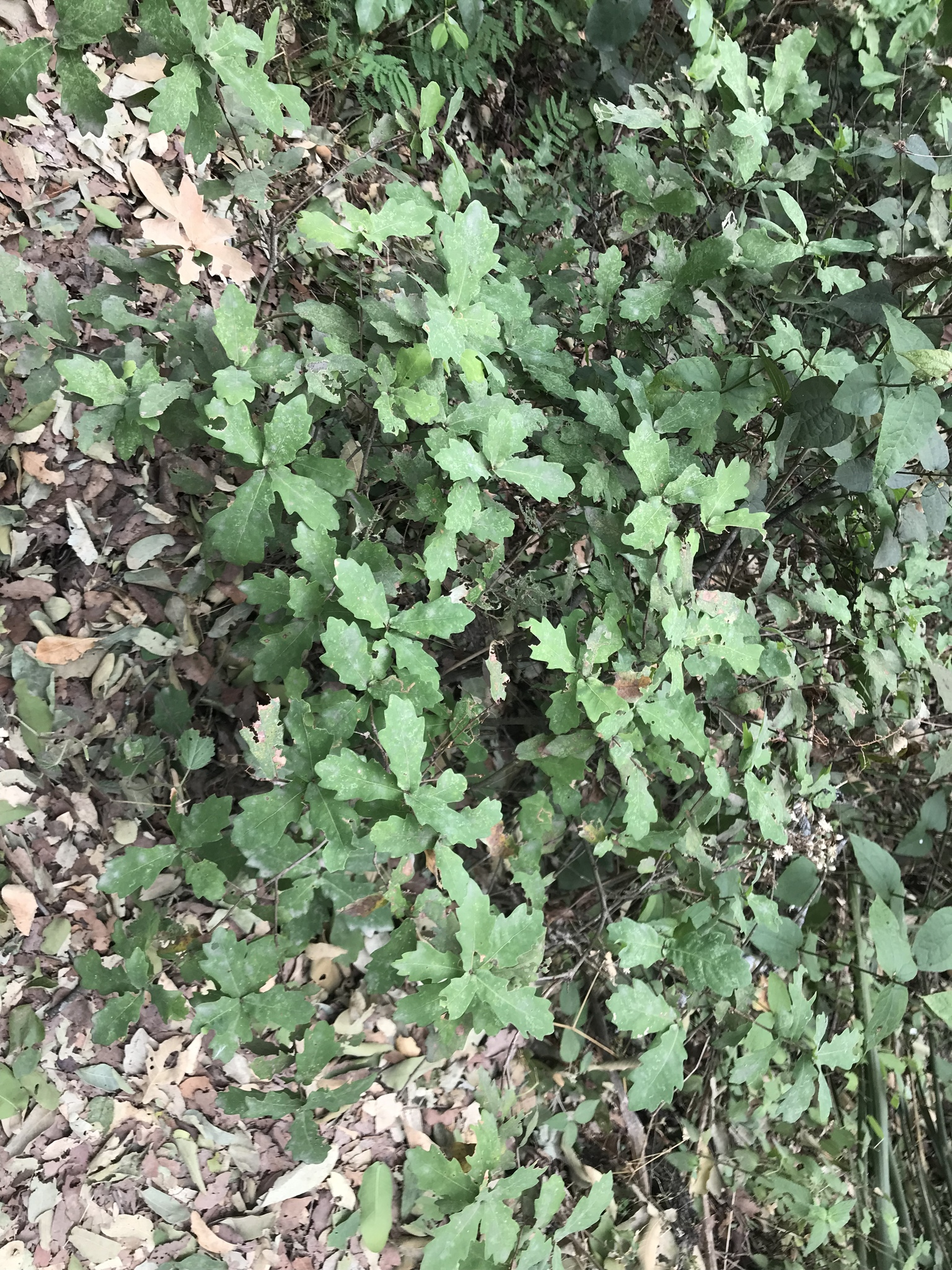

Conservation status
- Data Deficient (IUCN 3.1)

Scientific classification
- Kingdom: Plantae
- Clade: Embryophytes
- Clade: Tracheophytes
- Clade: Spermatophytes
- Clade: Angiosperms
- Clade: Eudicots
- Clade: Rosids
- Order: Fagales
- Family: Fagaceae
- Genus: Quercus
- Subgenus: Quercus subg. Quercus
- Section: Quercus sect. Quercus
- Species: Q. porphyrogenita

Binomial name
- Quercus porphyrogenita Trel.

Synonyms
- Quercus microlepis Trel. & C.H.Mull., nom. illeg.

= Quercus porphyrogenita =

Species of oak

Quercus porphyrogenita is a species of oak in the family Fagaceae, native to northeastern Mexico.

== Taxonomy ==
Quercus porphyrogenita was first described by William Trelease in 1924. It may be treated as a synonym of Quercus laceyi, but as of March 2023, is accepted by Plants of the World Online. Under the synonym Q. laceyi, it is placed in Quercus section Quercus.

== Distribution ==
Quercus porphyrogenita is native to northeastern Mexico – the states of Nuevo León and Tamaulipas.
