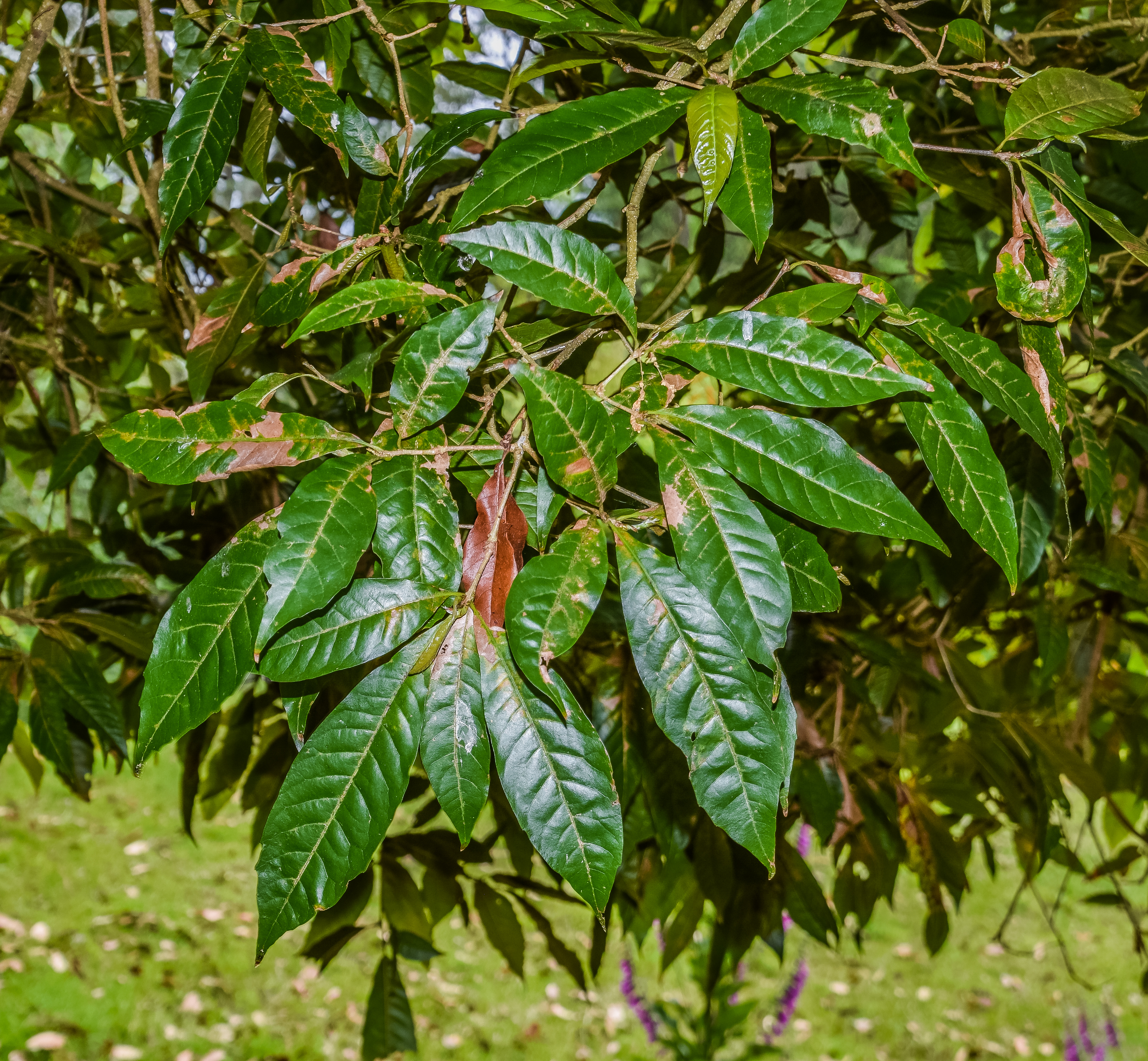

Conservation status
- Least Concern (IUCN 3.1)

Scientific classification
- Kingdom: Plantae
- Clade: Embryophytes
- Clade: Tracheophytes
- Clade: Spermatophytes
- Clade: Angiosperms
- Clade: Eudicots
- Clade: Rosids
- Order: Fagales
- Family: Fagaceae
- Genus: Quercus
- Subgenus: Quercus subg. Quercus
- Section: Quercus sect. Quercus
- Species: Q. germana

Binomial name
- Quercus germana Schltdl. & Cham.

Synonyms
- Quercus galeottii M.Martens; Quercus substenocarpa Trel.

= Quercus germana =

Species of oak tree

Quercus germana, the Mexican royal oak, is a species of oak tree in the family Fagaceae. It is native to mountain cloud forests in eastern Mexico. It is placed in section Quercus.

== Description ==
Quercus germana is a small to medium-sized tree, and can reach 12 metres (39 ft) in height.

As with other white oaks (subgenus Quercus, section Quercus) its acorns mature in a single season.

== Habitat and range ==
Quercus germana is endemic to eastern and northeastern Mexico, in Sierra Madre Oriental of (north to south) Tamaulipas, San Luis Potosí, Querétaro, Veracruz, Hidalgo, and Puebla states, and the Sierra Madre de Oaxaca of Puebla, Veracruz, and Oaxaca states.

It typically grows in cloud forests and less frequently in humid oak forests, at elevations of 800–1,800 metres (2,600–5,900 ft). It is generally sparse throughout its range. It is often associated with the trees Quercus lancifolia, Quercus pinnativenulosa, Platanus sp., and Alnus sp.

The species has an area of occupancy (AOO) of 500 km^{2}. The species has been under-sampled so the AOO is likely an under-estimate, but not likely to exceed 2,375 km^{2}.

== Conservation ==
It is an IUCN Red List least concern species, threatened by habitat loss.
