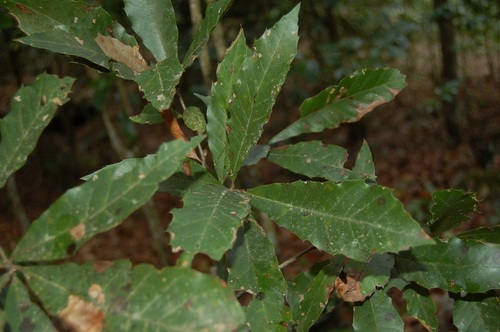

Conservation status
- Near Threatened (IUCN 3.1)

Scientific classification
- Kingdom: Plantae
- Clade: Embryophytes
- Clade: Tracheophytes
- Clade: Spermatophytes
- Clade: Angiosperms
- Clade: Eudicots
- Clade: Rosids
- Order: Fagales
- Family: Fagaceae
- Genus: Quercus
- Subgenus: Quercus subg. Quercus
- Section: Quercus sect. Lobatae
- Species: Q. cortesii

Binomial name
- Quercus cortesii Liebm.

= Quercus cortesii =

Species of oak tree

Quercus cortesii is a species of oak native to Central America and southern Mexico.

== Description ==
Quercus cortesii is a large evergreen tree, growing up to 40 meters tall.

Quercus cortesii is a slow-growing tree with a very long life-cycle. They are seldom found with acorns, and reproduce on cycles of five to ten years.

== Range and habitat ==
Quercus cortesii ranges through the mountains of Central America and southern Mexico, between 700 and 2400 meters elevation. The southern end of the range is the Cordillera de Talamanca in Costa Rica and Chiriquí Province of western Panama. In Mexico it is found on the eastern slope of the Trans-Mexican Volcanic Belt in Puebla and Veracruz states, and in the Sierra Madre de Chiapas and Chiapas Highlands of Chiapas state. It has also been reported in Oaxaca state.

Its typical habitat is montane cloud forests and other wet forest habitats.

The extent of occurrence (EOO) is 500,000 km^{2}, 676,000 km^{2} including Oaxaca. The area of occupancy (AOO) for the species is 416 km^{2}. The AOO is likely under-estimated due to very limited sampling, but is unlikely to exceed 2000 km^{2}.

== Conservation ==
Quercus cortesii is subject to habitat loss across its range from logging of montane forests, and forest clearance for agriculture and cattle pasture. There is little information about the state of some Central American populations. The species' conservation status is Near Threatened.
