= Quercus hirtifolia =

Conservation status
- Endangered (IUCN 3.1)

Scientific classification
- Kingdom: Plantae
- Clade: Embryophytes
- Clade: Tracheophytes
- Clade: Spermatophytes
- Clade: Angiosperms
- Clade: Eudicots
- Clade: Rosids
- Order: Fagales
- Family: Fagaceae
- Genus: Quercus
- Subgenus: Quercus subg. Quercus
- Section: Quercus sect. Lobatae
- Species: Q. hirtifolia

Binomial name
- Quercus hirtifolia M.L.Vázquez, S.Valencia & Nixon

Species of oak tree

Quercus hirtifolia is a rare Mexican species of oak. It has been found only in a small region of the southern Sierra Madre Oriental in northern Puebla and eastern Hidalgo states in east-central Mexico.

== Description ==
Quercus hirtifolia is a large shrub or small tree, growing up to 7 meters, and rarely to 9 meters, in height.

== Range and habitat ==
Quercus hirtifolia is native to the Sierra Madre Oriental, where it is found in small allopatric populations between 1600 and 2450 meters elevation. It inhabits humid oak-pine forests, cloud forests, and conifer forests.

Its geographic range is small, with an estimated area of occupancy (AOO) of 128 km^{2} and an extent of occurrence (EOO) of 3,700 km^{2}.

== Conservation and threats ==
The species has a limited range, and its habitat is declining in area, extent, and quality. Its conservation status is Endangered.

The principal threats are deforestation of its native habitat for conversion to livestock pasture and agriculture. It also faces threats from illegal logging. Climate change is expected to reduce cloud forest habitat in the Sierra Madre Oriental but about 45% by 2080, which would further reduce suitable habitat for the tree.
