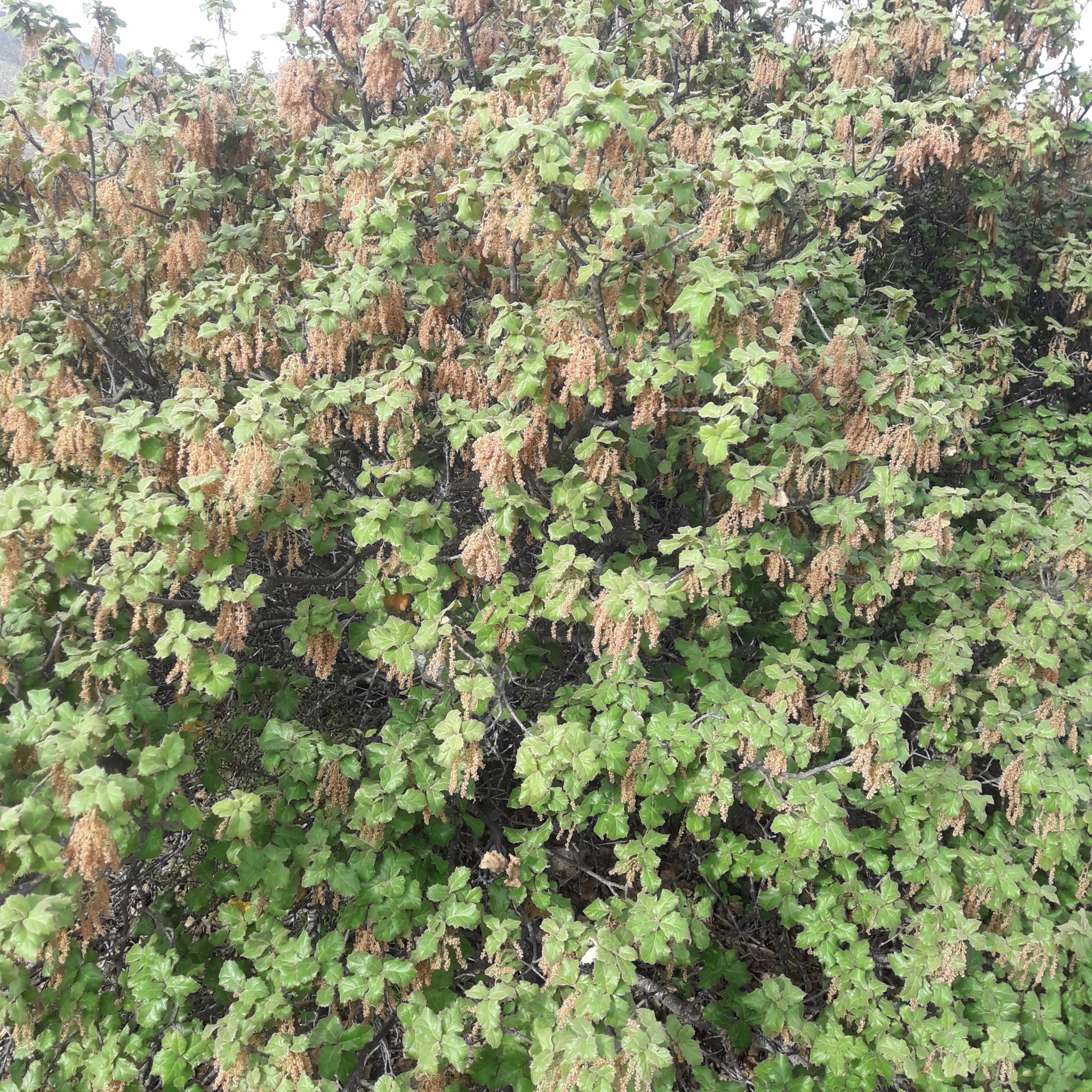

Conservation status
- Vulnerable (IUCN 3.1)

Scientific classification
- Kingdom: Plantae
- Clade: Embryophytes
- Clade: Tracheophytes
- Clade: Spermatophytes
- Clade: Angiosperms
- Clade: Eudicots
- Clade: Rosids
- Order: Fagales
- Family: Fagaceae
- Genus: Quercus
- Subgenus: Quercus subg. Quercus
- Section: Quercus sect. Lobatae
- Species: Q. hintoniorum

Binomial name
- Quercus hintoniorum Nixon & Müller

= Quercus hintoniorum =

Species of oak tree

Quercus hintoniorum is a species of oak. It has only been found in the northeastern Mexican states of Coahuila and Nuevo León.
