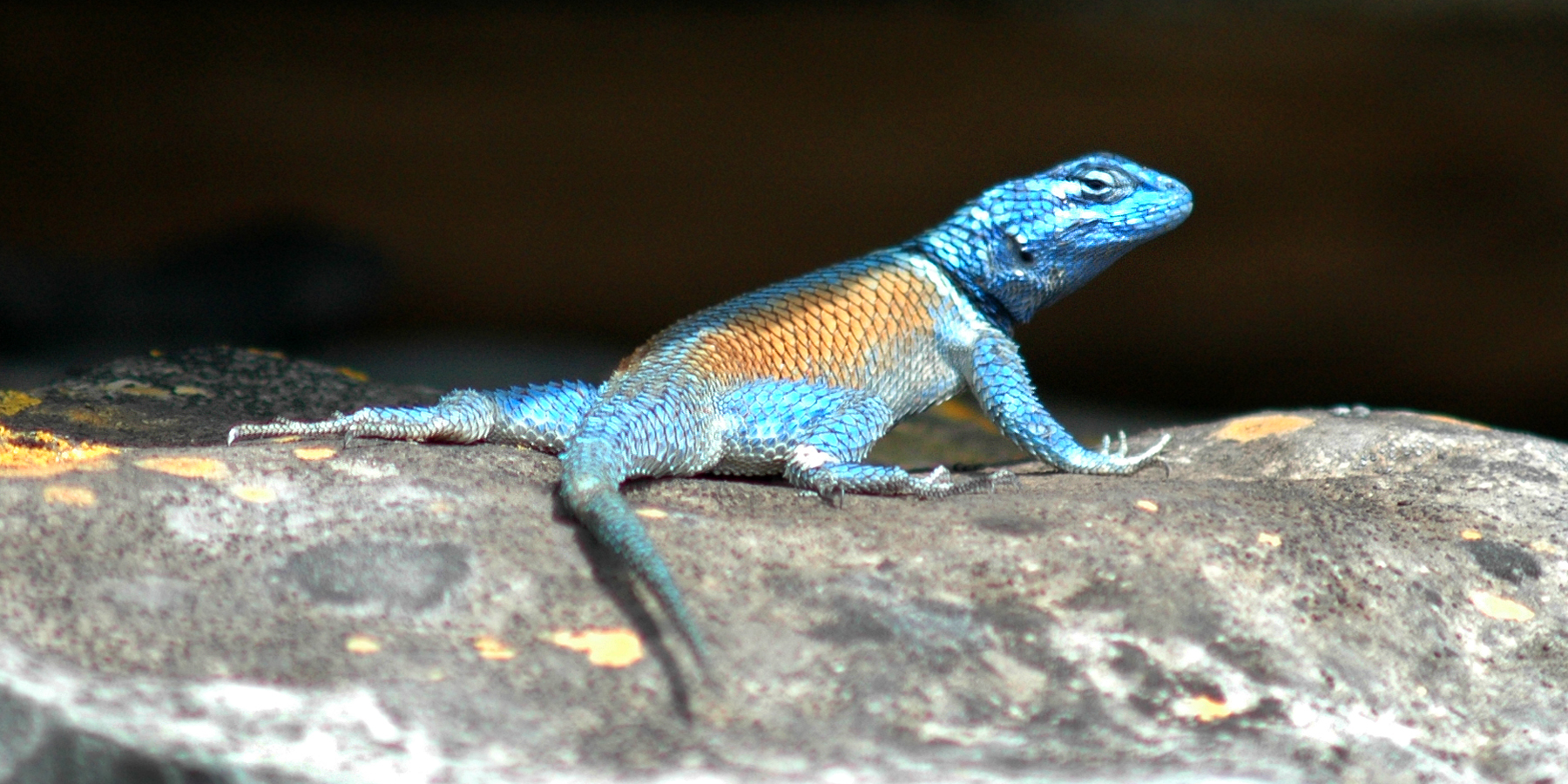

Conservation status
- Least Concern (IUCN 3.1)

Scientific classification
- Kingdom: Animalia
- Phylum: Chordata
- Class: Reptilia
- Order: Squamata
- Suborder: Iguania
- Family: Phrynosomatidae
- Genus: Sceloporus
- Species: S. minor

Binomial name
- Sceloporus minor Cope, 1885

= Sceloporus minor =

Minor lizard

Species of lizard

Sceloporus minor, the minor lizard or red minor lizard, is a species of lizard in the family Phrynosomatidae. It is endemic to Mexico.

A minor lizard at a reptile expo in Las Vegas.
