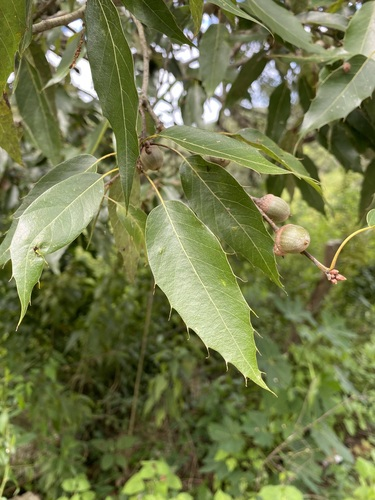
- A sprout of Quercus sartorii

Conservation status
- Near Threatened (IUCN 3.1)

Scientific classification
- Kingdom: Plantae
- Clade: Embryophytes
- Clade: Tracheophytes
- Clade: Spermatophytes
- Clade: Angiosperms
- Clade: Eudicots
- Clade: Rosids
- Order: Fagales
- Family: Fagaceae
- Genus: Quercus
- Subgenus: Quercus subg. Quercus
- Section: Quercus sect. Lobatae
- Species: Q. sartorii

Binomial name
- Quercus sartorii Liebm.

Synonyms
- Quercus sartorii f. magna Trel.

= Quercus sartorii =

Species of oak tree

Quercus sartorii is a species of oak tree known by the common name of Sartors oak. It is native to central and southern Mexico from Veracruz, San Luis Potosi, Hidalgo, Puebla, Oaxaca to Tamaulipas. It can reach heights of 25 metres (82 ft).
