= Quercus hypoxantha =

Conservation status
- Least Concern (IUCN 3.1)

Scientific classification
- Kingdom: Plantae
- Clade: Embryophytes
- Clade: Tracheophytes
- Clade: Spermatophytes
- Clade: Angiosperms
- Clade: Eudicots
- Clade: Rosids
- Order: Fagales
- Family: Fagaceae
- Genus: Quercus
- Subgenus: Quercus subg. Quercus
- Section: Quercus sect. Lobatae
- Species: Q. hypoxantha

Binomial name
- Quercus hypoxantha Trel.

Synonyms
- Quercus errans f. graciliramis C.H.Mull.

Species of oak tree

Quercus hypoxantha is a species of oak. It has been found only in northeastern Mexico, in the States of Tamaulipas, Coahuila, and Nuevo León.
