= Quercus ariifolia =

Conservation status
- Near Threatened (IUCN 3.1)

Scientific classification
- Kingdom: Plantae
- Clade: Embryophytes
- Clade: Tracheophytes
- Clade: Spermatophytes
- Clade: Angiosperms
- Clade: Eudicots
- Clade: Rosids
- Order: Fagales
- Family: Fagaceae
- Genus: Quercus
- Subgenus: Quercus subg. Quercus
- Section: Quercus sect. Quercus
- Species: Q. ariifolia

Binomial name
- Quercus ariifolia Trel.

Species of oak tree

Quercus ariifolia is a species of oak native to the Sierra Madre Oriental of Mexico.

== Description ==
Quercus ariifolia belongs to the Quercus rugosa group of species. The species of this group are characterized by obovate, occasionally broadly obovate or oblanceolate, leaves, with a strongly rugose upper surface and with clustered trichomes on the lower surface.

== Range and habitat ==
Quercus ariifolia is native to the southern Sierra Madre Oriental, where it is found in the states of Puebla, Hidalgo, Querétaro, and San Luis Potosí. It inhabits seasonally dry forests.
