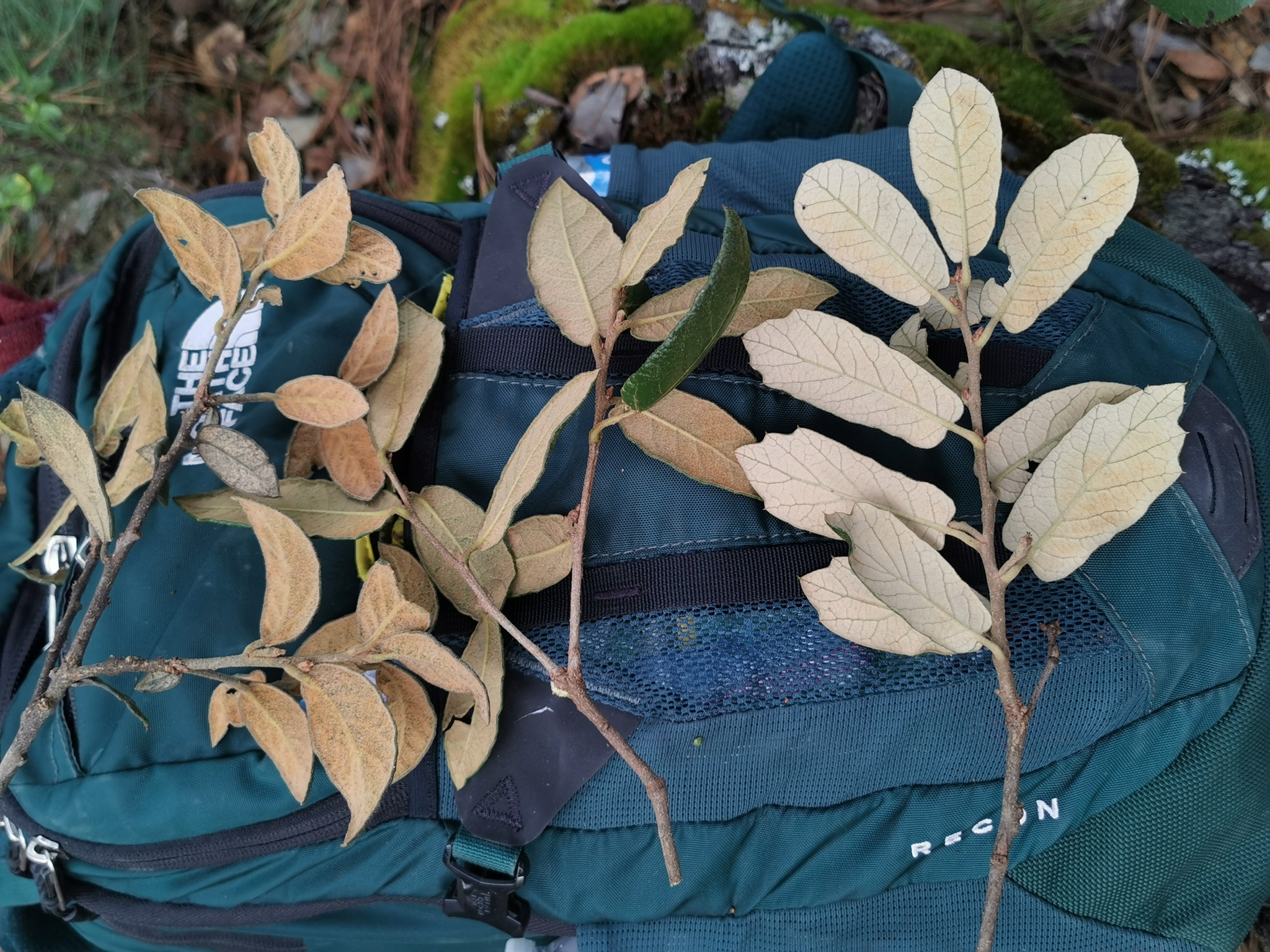

Conservation status
- Endangered (IUCN 3.1)

Scientific classification
- Kingdom: Plantae
- Clade: Embryophytes
- Clade: Tracheophytes
- Clade: Spermatophytes
- Clade: Angiosperms
- Clade: Eudicots
- Clade: Rosids
- Order: Fagales
- Family: Fagaceae
- Genus: Quercus
- Subgenus: Quercus subg. Quercus
- Section: Quercus sect. Lobatae
- Species: Q. miquihuanensis

Binomial name
- Quercus miquihuanensis Nixon & C.H.Mull.

= Quercus miquihuanensis =

Species of oak tree

Quercus miquihuanensis is a species of oak in the family Fagaceae. It is endemic to the Nuevo León and Tamaulipas states of Mexico. It is an endangered species, threatened by habitat loss. It is placed in section Lobatae.

== See also ==
- Endemic flora of Mexico
