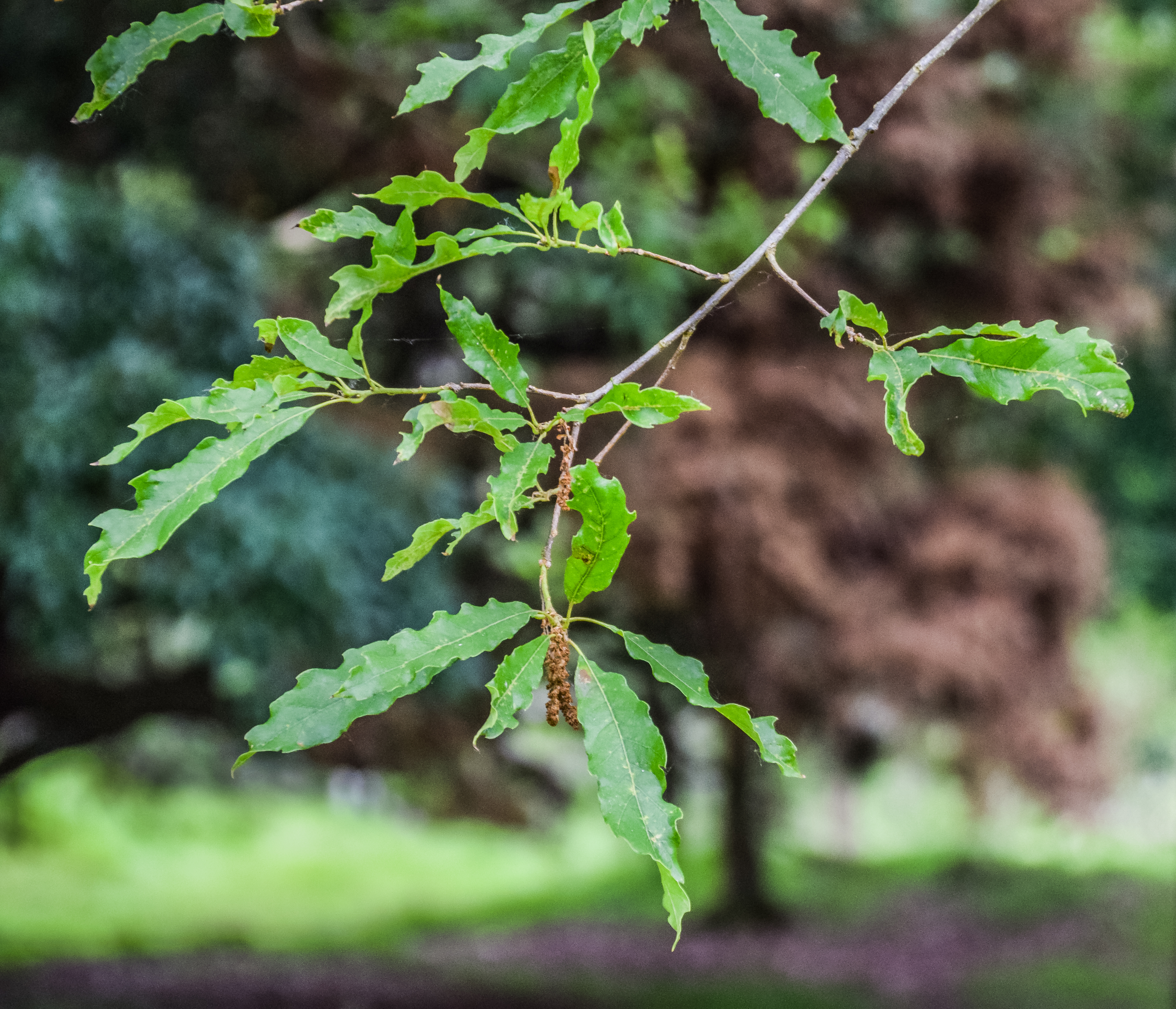

Conservation status
- Least Concern (IUCN 3.1)

Scientific classification
- Kingdom: Plantae
- Clade: Embryophytes
- Clade: Tracheophytes
- Clade: Spermatophytes
- Clade: Angiosperms
- Clade: Eudicots
- Clade: Rosids
- Order: Fagales
- Family: Fagaceae
- Genus: Quercus
- Subgenus: Quercus subg. Quercus
- Section: Quercus sect. Quercus
- Species: Q. lancifolia

Binomial name
- Quercus lancifolia Schltdl. & Cham.

Synonyms
- Quercus lancifolia var. monocarpa Wenz.; Quercus lancifolia f. pilosiuscula Wenz.; Quercus leiophylla A.DC.; Quercus leiophylla f. subintegra Trel.

= Quercus lancifolia =

Species of oak tree

Quercus lancifolia is a species of oak found in Central America and Mexico.

== Description ==
Quercus lancifolia is a large forest tree up to 30 metres (98 feet) tall with a trunk 100 centimetres (39 inches) or more in diameter. The leaves are up to 22 cm (8 5/8 in) long, sometimes with no lobes or teeth but sometimes with undulations or sharp teeth; they are green on top, and both whitish and waxy on the underside.

== Habitat and range ==
Quercus lancifolia inhabits montane cloud forests between 500 and 2,400 meters elevation. It can be a dominant species where it occurs.

In Mexico it is found in the southern Sierra Madre Oriental of Hidalgo, Veracruz, and Puebla states, the Sierra Madre de Oaxaca in Puebla and Oaxaca states, the Chiapas Highlands, and the Sierra Madre de Chiapas of Chiapas and adjacent Guatemala. In Central America it inhabits the Maya Mountains of Belize and the highlands of Guatemala, Honduras, Nicaragua, Costa Rica, and western Panama.

== Conservation and threats ==
Quercus lancifolia is affected by habitat loss and habitat fragmentation across most of its range. Of Mexico's original 3.1 million ha of cloud forest, only 28% remained by 2002, and half of what remained was degraded or secondary forest. In Veracruz only 10% of the original cloud forest area remains.

Although the population has not been quantitatively assessed, there are no reports of continued decline. The species' conservation status is assessed as Least Concern.
