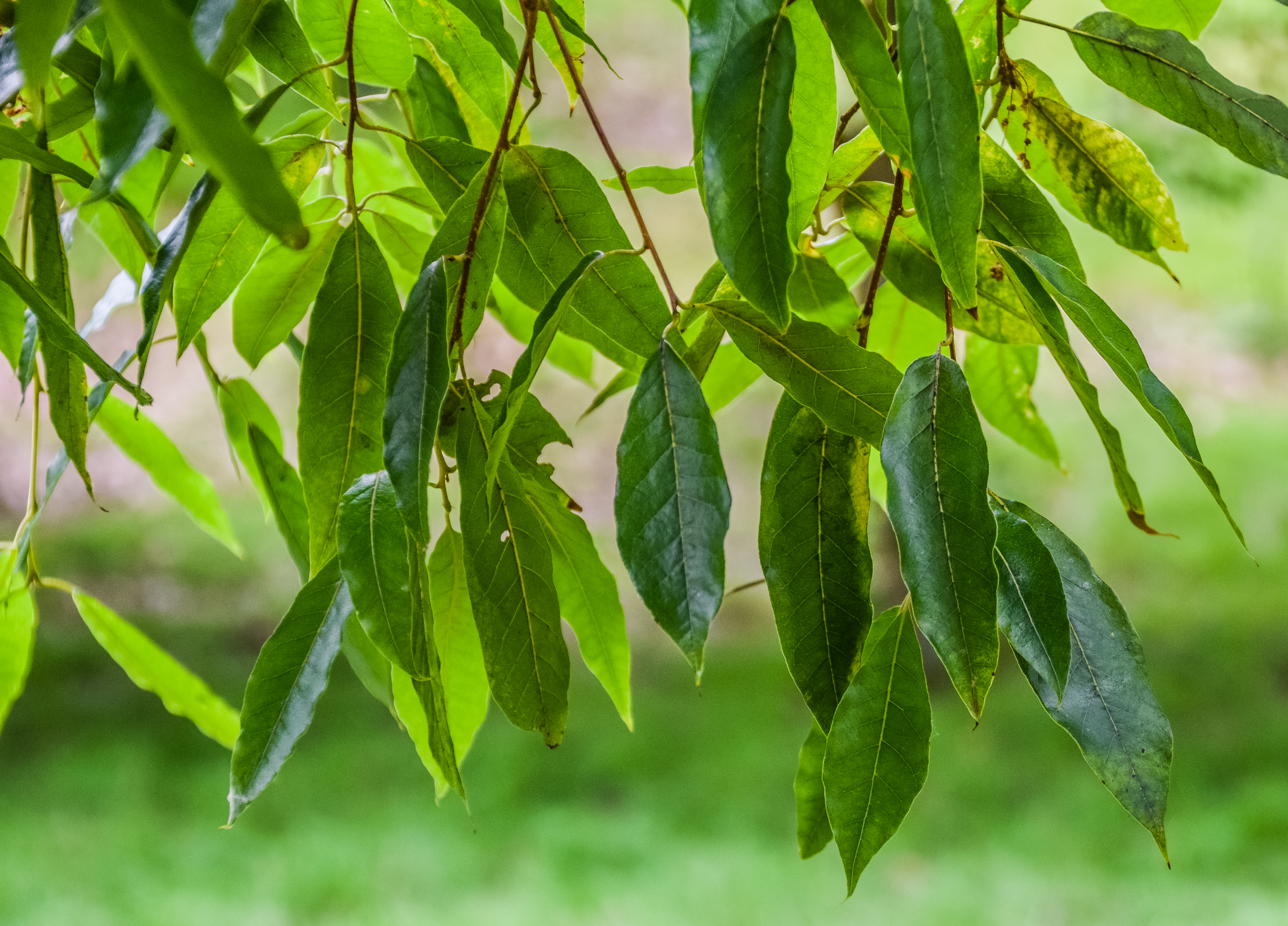

Conservation status
- Least Concern (IUCN 3.1)

Scientific classification
- Kingdom: Plantae
- Clade: Embryophytes
- Clade: Tracheophytes
- Clade: Spermatophytes
- Clade: Angiosperms
- Clade: Eudicots
- Clade: Rosids
- Order: Fagales
- Family: Fagaceae
- Genus: Quercus
- Subgenus: Quercus subg. Quercus
- Section: Quercus sect. Lobatae
- Species: Q. laurina

Binomial name
- Quercus laurina Humb. & Bonpl.

Synonyms
- List: Dryopsila laurina (Bonpl.) Raf.; Quercus barbinervis Benth.; Quercus bourgaei Oerst. ex Hemsl.; Quercus bourgaei var. ilicifolia Trel.; Quercus caeruleocarpa Trel.; Quercus castanea var. tridens (Bonpl.) A.DC.; Quercus chrysophylla Bonpl.; Quercus lanceolata Bonpl.; Quercus lanceolata var. undulatodentata A.DC.; Quercus laurina Liebm. ex A.DC.; Quercus laurina var. barbinervis (Benth.) Wenz.; Quercus laurina var. major (A.DC.) Wenz.; Quercus major (A.DC.) Trel.; Quercus malinaltepecana Trel.; Quercus nitens var. major A.DC.; Quercus orizabae Liebm.; Quercus roseovenulosa Trel.; Quercus salicifolia Benth.; Quercus salicifolia var. tlapuxahuensis (A.DC.) Wenz.; Quercus tlapuxahuensis A.DC.; Quercus tlapuxahuensis var. obconica Trel.; Quercus treleaseana A.Camus; Quercus tridens Bonpl.

= Quercus laurina =

Species of oak tree

Quercus laurina is a species of oak. It is native primarily to Mexico (from Tamaulipas to Chiapas) and has also been found in Guatemala and El Salvador.

Q. laurina is a tree up to 30 metres (98 feet) tall with a trunk as much as 50 centimetres (20 inches) or more in diameter. The leaves are thick and leathery, up to 15.5 cm (6 in) long, elliptical sometimes with a few large teeth near the tip.

The species forms hybrids with Quercus affinis.
