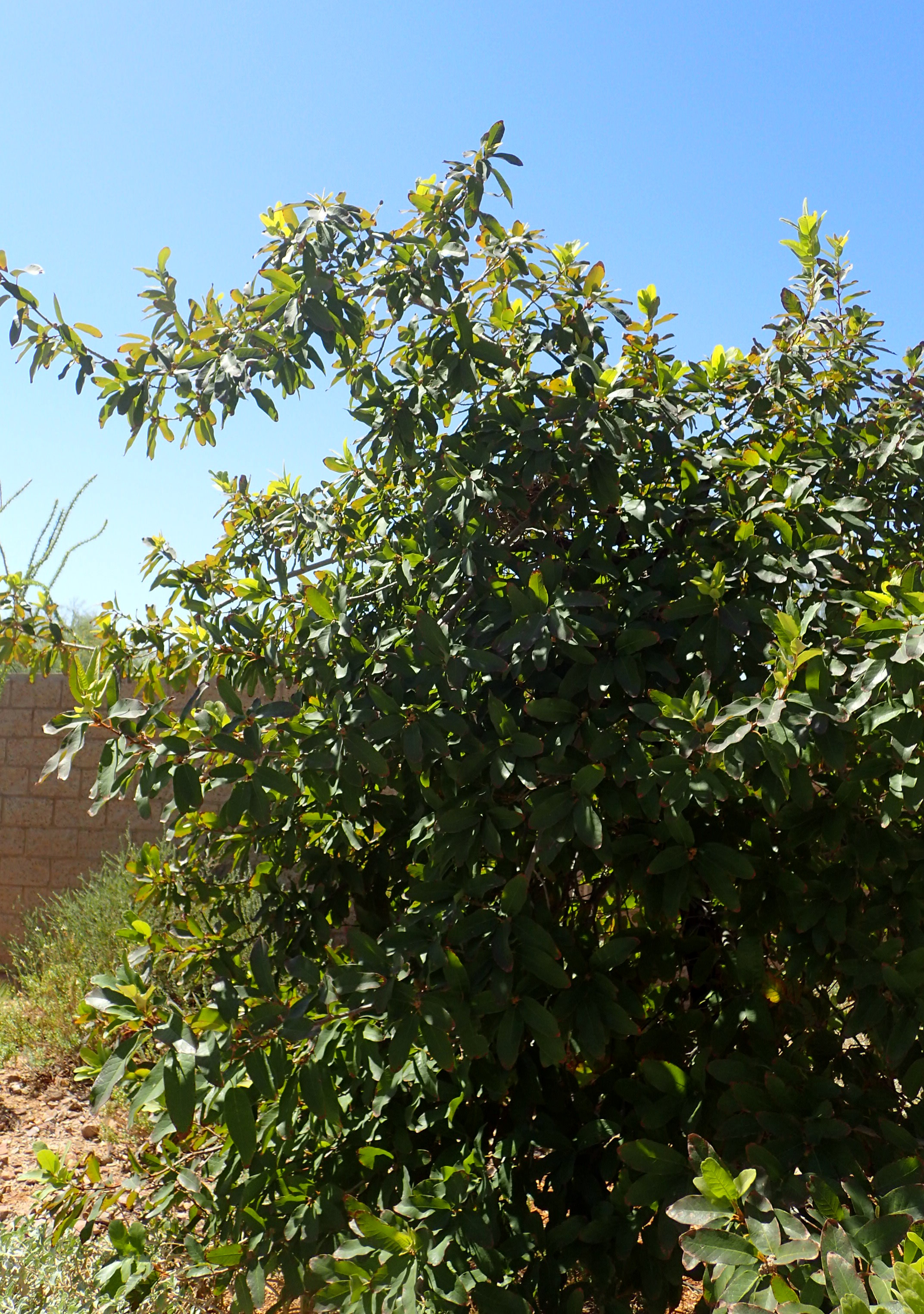

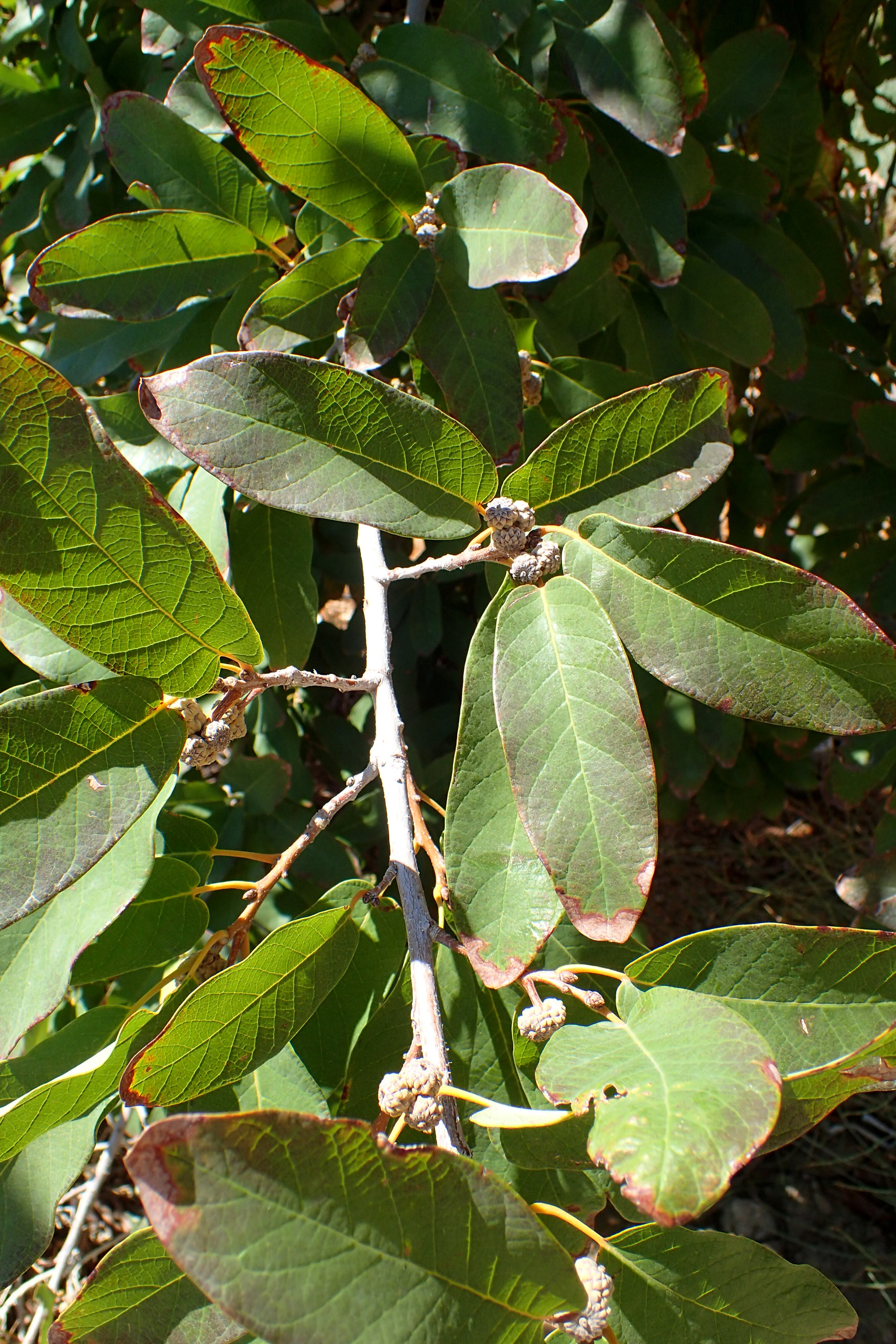

Conservation status
- Least Concern (IUCN 3.1)

Scientific classification
- Kingdom: Plantae
- Clade: Embryophytes
- Clade: Tracheophytes
- Clade: Spermatophytes
- Clade: Angiosperms
- Clade: Eudicots
- Clade: Rosids
- Order: Fagales
- Family: Fagaceae
- Genus: Quercus
- Subgenus: Quercus subg. Quercus
- Section: Quercus sect. Quercus
- Species: Q. polymorpha

Binomial name
- Quercus polymorpha Schlecht. & Cham.

Synonyms
- Quercus germana var. lemmonii Trel.; Quercus guatimalensis A.DC.; Quercus petiolaris Benth.; Quercus polymorpha f. angustifolia C.H.Mull.; Quercus turbinata Liebm.; Quercus varians M.Martens & Galeotti

= Quercus polymorpha =

Species of oak tree

Quercus polymorpha, the Mexican white oak, Monterrey oak or netleaf white oak, is a North American species of oak. It is widespread in Mexico, Guatemala, and Honduras, and known from a single population in the United States (about 30 kilometres or 19 miles north of the Río Grande in Val Verde County, Texas) but widely planted as an ornamental.

== Description ==
Quercus polymorpha is a subevergreen tree up to 20 meters (67 feet) tall. The bark is gray or brown. The leaves are elliptical or egg-shaped, up to 15 centimetres (6 inches) long, unlobed or with a few shallow rounded lobes.

== Range and habitat ==
Quercus polymorpha ranges across eastern and southern Mexico, in the Sierra Madre Oriental and Sierra Madre de Oaxaca ranges, the Chiapas Highlands of southeastern Mexico, and scattered locations on the Mexican Plateau, Trans-Mexican Volcanic Belt, and Sierra Madre Occidental. It is found in the states of Nuevo León, Tamaulipas, San Luis Potosí, Querétaro, Hidalgo, Veracruz, Puebla, Oaxaca, Chiapas, Coahuila, Guanajuato, Jalisco, Sinaloa, Michoacán, and Morelos. There is a single population in Val Verde County of southern Texas. There are scattered populations in the Guatemalan Highlands of central Guatemala, including Chiquimula, Huehuetenango, Jalapa, and Zacapa, and in western Honduras.

The species grows in a variety of habitats, including deep canyons in the Sierra Madre Oriental, riparian gallery forests, the margins of thorn scrub forest, tropical dry forests, the lower margins of montane oak–pine forests, and cloud forests. It is found from 400 to 2,100 meters elevation.
