= Quercus greggii =

Gregg oak (Quercus greggii)
- Tall Quercus greggii specimen at University of California Botanical Garden

Conservation status
- Least Concern (IUCN 3.1)

Scientific classification
- Kingdom: Plantae
- Clade: Tracheophytes
- Clade: Angiosperms
- Clade: Eudicots
- Clade: Rosids
- Order: Fagales
- Family: Fagaceae
- Genus: Quercus
- Subgenus: Quercus subg. Quercus
- Section: Quercus sect. Quercus
- Species: Q. greggii

Binomial name
- Quercus greggii (A.DC.) Trel.

Synonyms
- List: Quercus derrumbaderoensis C.H.Mull.; Quercus greggii f. subglabra C.H.Mull.; Quercus loeseneri Trel.; Quercus reticulata var. greggii A.D.C.; Quercus reticulata f. pungens C.H.Mull.; Quercus revoluta f. pungens C.H.Mull.

Species of oak tree

Quercus greggii, sometimes known as Gregg oak in horticulture, is an evergreen or semi-evergreen oak in the white oak group native to Mexico. The species is found chiefly in the Sierra Madre Oriental and Mexican Plateau in oak and pine-oak forests at around 2,000–3,300 metres (6,600–10,800 ft) in elevation. It is distinguished by small, thick, leathery leaves with densely tomentose undersides. It usually grows as a dense shrub 1-4m tall, but sometimes develops into a small tree.

== Taxonomy ==
The specific epithet greggii honors the American explorer and plant collector Josiah Gregg, who collected the type specimen (J. Gregg 380) near Saltillo, Coahuila, on August 31, 1848. Alphonse de Candolle initially described the taxon as Quercus reticulata var. greggii in 1864 and William Trelease raised it to species rank in 1922.

Within the genus Quercus, Quercus greggii is placed into the subgenus Quercus sectionQuercus, the white oak group. Names now treated as synonyms include Quercus derrumbaderoensis and Quercus loeseneri.

== Description ==
This oak is usually a shrub that grows 1-4m tall, occasionally taking tree form reaching 4-8 m in height.. The leaves are very thick, leathery and somewhat stiff with densely tomentose undersides. The leaves are dark greyish green on top and pale brown or light yellow below. They are borne on petioles 2-8mm long. The leaf shape can be quite diverse: they may be obovate, oblong, elliptic, broadly ovate, or sometimes nearly round and also may be entire, shallowly scalloped or have 2-4 teeth near the tip. The leaves are 2.5-5.3cm long, 2.4 - 3.8cm wide and can be twice as long as they are wide.The leaves are covered in trichomes, which are lost on the upper surface with age, but remain on the veins, petioles and lower surfaces and may become interwoven with time. The leaves usually have 5-8 pairs of secondary veins which may zigzag and fork as they reach the edge of the leaf. The secondary veins are impressed, which gives the leaves a wrinkled appearance.

The bark is gray and scaly. The twigs are 1.5-4mm in diameter, densely pubescent without visible lenticels.

Foliage

The wooly leaf undersides

Developing acorn

Mature bark texture

Around April, the trees produce catkins that can have approximately 18 flowers are around 3–4.5 cm long. As the plants are monoecious (producing male and female cones on the same plant), they also produce female inflorescences. The female inflorescence generally grow around 2–4 flowers and are covered in trichomes, like the leaves of the plants. Like many more commonly known oaks, Mexican oaks utilize their male and female reproductive structures to produce the acorn nuts of the plant, which can appear alone or in clusters on small peduncles stemming from the main branches. The acorns contain a seed and eventually fall from the tree to start the growth of a new Mexican oak.

== Distribution ==
Gregg oak is endemic to Mexico, chiefly in the Sierra Madre Oriental and Mexican Plateau regions. It has been observed in Coahuila, Hidalgo, Nuevo León, Oaxaca, Puebla, Querétaro, San Luis Potosí, Tamaulipas, Veracruz and Zacatecas with Michoacan being on the edge of its range.

This oak occurs at elevations of 2000-3050m.

== Cultivation ==
La Siberica is a cultivar selection of this species.
