= Quercus affinis =

Conservation status
- Least Concern (IUCN 3.1)

Scientific classification
- Kingdom: Plantae
- Clade: Embryophytes
- Clade: Tracheophytes
- Clade: Spermatophytes
- Clade: Angiosperms
- Clade: Eudicots
- Clade: Rosids
- Order: Fagales
- Family: Fagaceae
- Genus: Quercus
- Subgenus: Quercus subg. Quercus
- Section: Quercus sect. Lobatae
- Species: Q. affinis

Binomial name
- Quercus affinis Scheidw. non M.Martens & Galeotti

Synonyms
- Quercus affinis f. commutata (Liebm.) Trel.; Quercus affinis f. subintegra (A.DC.) Trel.; Quercus affinis var. typica A.Camus; Quercus commutata Liebm.; Quercus lancifolia Benth.; Quercus nitens M.Martens & Galeotti; Quercus nitens var. subintegra A.DC.

Species of oak tree

Quercus affinis is a species of oak native only to Mexico, mostly to the Sierra Madre Oriental pine-oak forests.

== Description ==
Quercus affinis is a medium-sized evergreen tree which grows up to 16 or 20 meters tall. The leaves are dark green and glossy with toothed edges. Young leaves are sometimes flushed bronze. Trees produce flowers and catkins in the spring, which by autumn mature into small, rounded acorns up to 1.5 cm long. With its laurel-like leaves it can be confused with its close relative Q. laurina, with which it easily hybridizes in the wild.

== Range and habitat ==
Quercus affinis ranges through the mountains of eastern Mexico, between 1200 and 2600 meters elevation. Its range includes the Sierra Madre Oriental of Nuevo León, Tamaulipas, San Luis Potosí, Guanajuato, Querétaro, Hidalgo, and Veracruz states, the eastern Trans-Mexican Volcanic Belt of Veracruz and Puebla, and the Sierra Madre de Oaxaca of Puebla and Oaxaca, with some outlying populations in the Sierra Madre del Sur of Guerrero.

Quercus affinis is typically found in cloud forest, frequently associated with Liquidambar styraciflua. It also found in oak forests, pine–oak forests, and pine forests. It favors shallow karstic limestone soils with acid pH.

== Conservation ==
The pine–oak forests of Mexico have been extensively logged for timber, firewood, and charcoal. Other threats include habitat loss from forest clearing for cattle pasture and agriculture.

Despite logging and loss of habitat across its range, its population is considered stable.

== Cultivation ==
It has gained the Royal Horticultural Society's Award of Garden Merit.
