= 2007 Tabasco flood =

Natural disaster in Mexico

Coordinates: 17.972°N 92.588°W

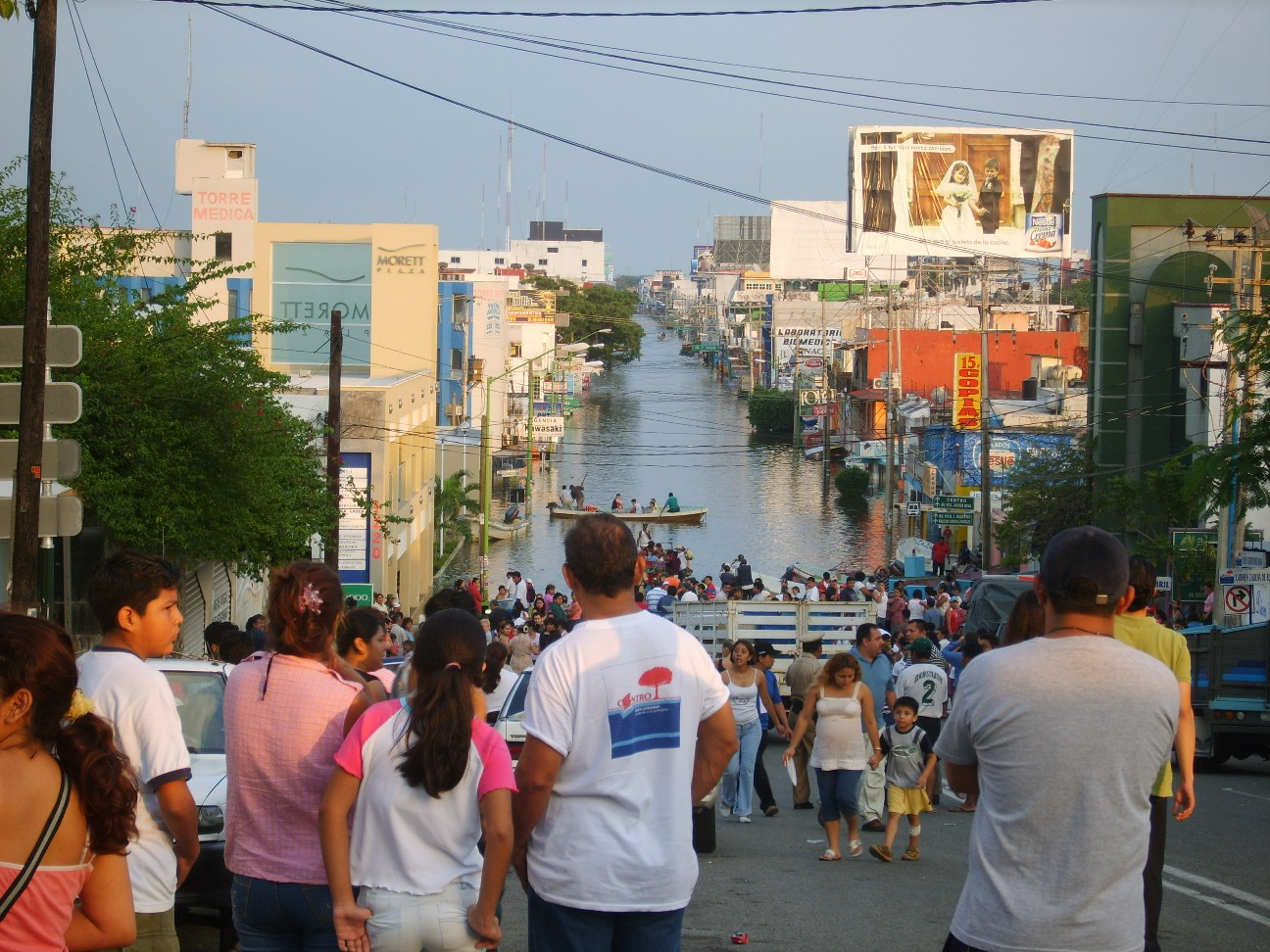
Avenida Méndez, Villahermosa, Tabasco

The 2007 Tabasco flood occurred in late October and early November 2007 in the Mexican states of Tabasco and Chiapas, in which as much as 80% of the former was left under water. At least 20,000 people were forced to seek emergency shelter. Over 1,000,000 residents were affected.

== Geography ==
Location of Tabasco within Mexico

Three rivers flow through the low-lying city of Villahermosa, and the urban landscape is marked by a number of lagoons.

The southern Mexican state of Tabasco is bordered by the states of Veracruz to the west, Chiapas to the south, and Campeche to the north-east. To the east Tabasco borders with the Petén department of Guatemala, and to the north with the Gulf of Mexico. Tabasco is in the northern half of the Isthmus of Tehuantepec. The state capital is Villahermosa.

The hydrology of Tabasco is complex. Most of the state is a wide coastal plain crossed by rivers coming from the mountains further south in Chiapas and Guatemala. The two main rivers in the region are the Río Grijalva and the Río Usumacinta, which converge before draining into the Gulf of Mexico north of Villahermosa through the wildlife-rich wetlands known as the Pantanos de Centla.

These rivers are considered mature, since they are in the lowest part of their course, and the plain they cross allows them broad, wide flows, meandering and dividing into separate branches. This is the case with the Grijalva, which separates into several branches in the central part of Tabasco (known locally as the Río Carrizal, Río Samaría and Río Mezcalapa). These three rivers converge at Villahermosa, where they recombine and again take the name Grijalva. The main branch of the Grijalva in Chiapas is dammed by the country's four largest hydroelectric plants.

== Causes of the floods ==
The Tabasco floods caused largely by the sinking of the land over the last century. The constant extraction of petroleum and gas, the construction of dams in the zone, the erosion of land and deforestation have all contributed toward making this region more flood-prone. Deforestation has allowed silt to fill in rivers thereby reducing their capacity and making floods more likely. With the onset of constant rainfall due to a low pressure system located nearby, the combination of these influences contributed to making the flood event even worse than it might otherwise have been.

Some have suggested that global warming has increased sea levels, making water regions at the low sandy zones of the Gulf of Mexico disappear. However, sea level rises due to global warming were probably still negligible in their contribution to these floods.

A number of sources point to the misuse of hydroelectric dams as a cause of the floods. Hydroelectric plants in the dams of Tabasco share the production of electricity with newer, private, more expensive gas plants. Investors complained that government owned plants cover most of the production of the electricity, lowering the price, and have put pressure on the government to lessen production on hydroelectric plants in order for them to sell more energy and raise their profit levels. This allegedly led to the dams retaining more water than they should have done.

== Impact ==
Tabasco was subject to heavy rain in late October and early November 2007, causing widespread flooding. As much as 80% of the state was under water. At least 20,000 people were forced to leave their houses in the search of emergency shelter. Over 1,000,000 residents have been affected.

The 2007 Tabasco flood not only destroyed many family houses and took away people's belongings, but also affected theaters, libraries, artistic schools and museums. One of the buildings affected was the house of the poet Carlos Pellicer Cámara, which ended up under the water. The house where the poet lived his childhood is located in Narciso Sáenz 203, in the center of Villahermosa, Tabasco. Another historical house affected is located at 620 Calle Lerdo de Tejada, in Villahermosa, close to Carlos Pellicer's house. The house once was occupied by José Gorostiza, the author of the Muerte sin fin poem, his brother, the dramatist Celestino Gorostiza, and the man of letters Andrés Iduarte.

Economic impact at national levels will be insignificant. There is important damage in the fields which is causing increases in banana and cacao prices. The flood in Tabasco will not affect the economy in Mexico as much. Guillermo Ortiz Martínez, president of the Banco de México (the central bank), agrees that Mexico will not have excessive inflation because of the Tabasco flood. But some prices of products will increase such as banana and cacao. The General Peasant Confederation informed that because of the flooding, 100% of the harvests are lost. This represents an economic damage of US$480 million. President Felipe Calderón has sent seven thousand and five hundred people to help people in Tabasco. This is because of the major damage to roads, houses, and farms.

The flood destroyed agricultural production in the state of Tabasco, the largest producer of cocoa in the country and a major source of bananas, but is not expected that losses affect international prices, experts said on Friday. Tabasco produces 80% of all Mexico's cocoa and 40% of its bananas, according to Luis Rey Carrasco Linares, an expert from the Autonomous University of Chapingo with his squad in Tabasco. The heavy rains that punished the state for more than a week occurred during the cocoa harvest, which lasts from September to December, Carrasco said. All this year's harvest is under water and was lost, he added. The floods caused profound devastation to agriculture, which is a Principal source of Income in the state. The loss will have its greatest impact for the more than 30,000 families who earn their living in the production of cocoa, Carrasco said, adding that before the flood, farmers were grappling with a plague of fungus.

"The situation is extraordinarily serious: This is one of the worst natural disasters in the history of the country" said President Felipe Calderón in a televised address on the night of 1 November 2007.

The Tabasco flood caused the loss of thousands of books from the Villahermosa central library and 78 other libraries from five different municipalities. The Grijalva River affected the infrastructure and works of the José María Pino Suárez State Library where the entire vault has much water. The water also flooded the auditorium causing widespread damage to furniture and equipment, rising to the second floor and damaging 15,000 books from the general collection.

== Chronology ==
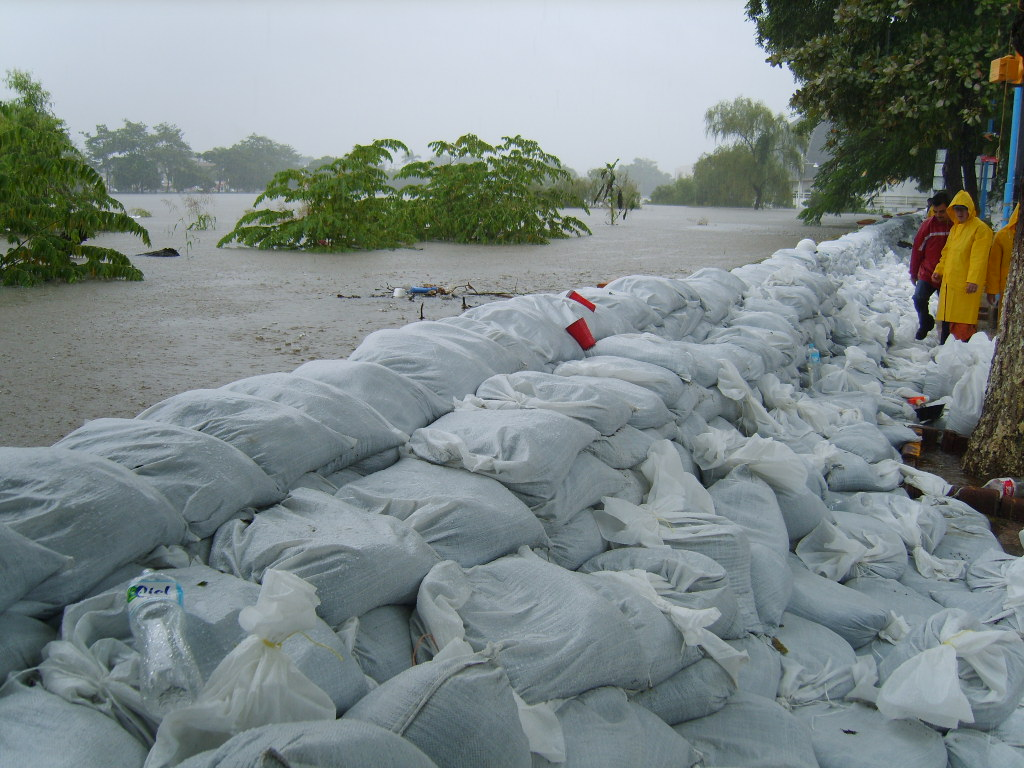
Using sandbags to try to contain the water

- 23 October 2007: An accident that occurred amid storm conditions in the Bay of Campeche necessitates the evacuation of a Pemex oil exploration platform. In the rescue operation, 23 workers' lives are lost and, days later, a major oil slick arrives on the coast of Campeche and Tabasco. Heavy rain continues to fall over the southern Gulf Coast for the remainder of the week.
- 30 October 2007: In the afternoon of 30 October, the Río Grijalva and some of its affluents begin to break their banks. Flooding alerts are broadcast over local TV and radio for the municipalities of Centro, Cunduacán, Jalapa, Jalpa de Méndez, Nacajuca and Tacotalpa. Evacuations of towns at greatest risk begins. The federal Secretariat of the Interior issues a declaration of emergency for the entire state.
- 31 October 2007: Tabasco Governor Andrés Granier announces that 70% of the state is under water and 300,000 people affected. Damage is also reported to the south in Chiapas, along with the first reports of missing people.
- 1 November 2007: Granier states that "80% of the state is probably flooded" and gave a figure of 400,000 people affected. President Felipe Calderón tours the affected area and, that evening, addresses the nation on television to report on the gravity of the situation.
- 2 November 2007: In the early morning hours, the Grijalva breaks the dykes in Villahermosa and the city's central district is ordered evacuated. A million people's homes are under water.
- 3 November 2007: With the authorities fearing looting in Villahermosa, the army is deployed at supermarkets to ensure order.
- 4 November 2007: Some shops and lorries are looted in spite of the army presence. Residents relocated to shelters complain about inadequacies in the distribution of aid.
- 5 November 2007: Food shortages are reported at the shelters. Calderón visits the area for a third time and announces a "fiscal amnesty" plan for the state including the cancellation of tax payments and electricity bills. In the evening, a landslide washes away 50 houses in the village of Juan del Grijalva on the Tabasco-Chiapas border; 70 people are reported missing.
- 6 November 2007: The water levels in both the Grijalva and the Carrizal fall significantly overnight. Pumping begins to drain the city of Villahermosa.
- 17 November 2007: Panic spreads as rumors of a river blockage at Juan del Grijalva in the Upper Grijalva river will destroy the Penitas dam and re-flood Villahermosa with greater devastation.

== Causes and prevention ==
Tabasco is one of the richest states in Mexico in terms of petroleum, however it is one of the poorest states in terms of social services and health. It has been widely claimed that the disaster could have been prevented or at least limited, but the money that was assigned to infrastructure has vanished. The National Water Commission (CONAGUA) was responsible for the construction of hydraulic repairs in the "Peñitas' ditch", which would have reduced the impact of the water in Tabasco. Authorities are making plans to avoid the repetition of this tragedy, elaborating on the existing flood management systems constructed after the floods of 1999. This hydraulic infrastructure will include the construction of borders, breakwaters and sea walls to fight the sea, as well as dredging the rivers to increase peak capacity.

== Response ==
=== National ===
Students in Guadalajara collect donations for Tabasco

The flood tragedy resulted in great national unity among people living throughout Mexico as well as an outpouring of support from abroad. Hundreds of people from all parts of Mexico made donations including those from states that were in previously similar crisis such as Hurricane Dean victims. Entertainers such as Alejandro Fernández, Thalía, members of Los Tigres del Norte, Jaguares, Hombres G, Lorena Ochoa, Místico and Miguel Bosé have also shown their support. Many Mexico football clubs, and their players, also collected significant donations.

Club	Amount	Reference
Pumas UNAM	15 tons of provisions. 2 trailers came out of CU (Ciudad Universitaria) one with 32 tons, and the other with 29 tons of provisions.	
Cruz Azul	Football players gathered provisions at La Noria	Pictures
Monterrey	Gathered 3 tons of provisions (around 90 tons where gathered from the people in Monterrey). Lent their stadium to use for shelter.	
Chivas de Guadalajara	Together with Atlas, and Tecos, gathered 75 tons of provisions through a campaign titled Firmanos tu Ayuda (We sign your help). Donated 4 houses and scheduled a game on 17 November between Chivas and Chivas USA with all the money from the entrance to be donated as well as the money from the entrance against Chiapas.	Pictures
Atlas	Together with Chivas, and Tecos, gathered 75 tons of provisions through the campaign Firmanos tu Ayuda.	Pictures
Tecos	Together with Atlas, and Chivas, gathered 75 tons of provisions through the campaign Firmanos tu Ayuda. They also sent doctors to Tabasco, and lent their stadium for the campaign.	Pictures
Veracruz	Gathered provisions at their stadium	
Tigres	Will lend their stadium	
Pachuca	Gathered provisions at their stadiums. Will donate 10% of the money gathered in their next game against Pumas.	Pictures
San Luis	Gathered provisions at their stadium and will donate money gathered at their next game.	
Chiapas	Gathered provisions and lent their stadium	
Puebla	Lent their stadium and donated all the money obtained from their game against Chivas de Guadalajara	
Monarcas Morelia	Gathered provisions and donated 30% of the money obtained at their game against Cruz Azul	
Santos	Donated half of the money obtained from the game against Tigres	
América	Helped through "Fundacion Televisa"	

Special Mention:

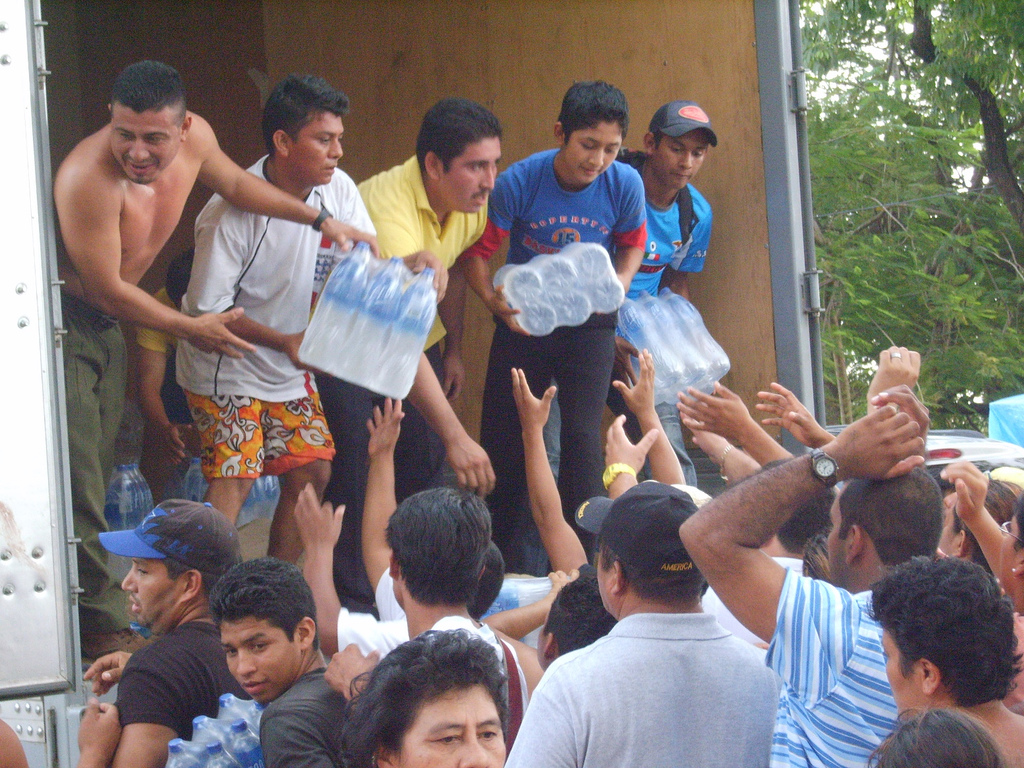
People receiving water from a rescue group

- Two players from the Mexico national team, Guillermo Ochoa from Club América and Gerardo Torrado from Cruz Azul on 11 November 2007 gathered provisions in exchange for autographs at the Martí Pedregal mall.
- Spanish club Real Madrid will give a certain percentage of the money gathered at their game against Mallorca and will provide a number in which people in Spain can make their donations. The total amount donated was off US$100,000
- Televisa donated US$5,000 for every goal scored in the Jornada 16 of the Mexico Apertura 2007 tournament. 26 goals were scored, thus the donation was of US$130,000.
- Omar Bravo from the Mexico national team and from Chivas de Guadalajara gathered provisions through a campaign titled Corazón Compartido (Shared Heart), where he personally handed out a special jersey to the first 500 fans who attended the event with 5 kilograms of provisions or more.

=== International ===
International aid donated or pledged as of 13 November 2007 3:32 PM CDT

Nation	Amount	Reference
Cuba	50 doctors on secondment	
Flemish Community (Belgium)	EUR 110,000	
Republic of Ireland	EUR 1,000,000	
Germany	EUR 250,000	
United Kingdom	10 inflatable dinghies	
Canada	CAD 500,000	
Japan	JPY 14,000,000 (US$126,000)	
United States	US$300,000	

Organization/Entity	Amount	Reference
Wal-Mart	US$600,000	
California	boats, dry suits, blankets, generators	

== Economic consequences ==
One week after the severe flooding, the capital of the state was in bankruptcy in part because flooding has affected various settlements. According to the local Chamber of Commerce, almost 15,000 establishments in downtown Villahermosa suffered losses of 100% in their infrastructure and inventories. This situation might cause a severe recession in the local economy, because many of these business beside having lost all their invested capital, have obligations with their suppliers, payments delayed with the government and workers' wages.

== Looting ==
The disappearance of persons, acts of looting, lack of supplies and skin diseases are some of the effects suffered by thousands of victims in Tabasco. Drinking water and food shortages brought on by flooded roads in Tabasco prompted several looting incidents at abandoned homes and businesses.

The worst incident took place Saturday morning when around 1,000 people overran a downtown shopping center in Tabasco, overwhelming law enforcement officials posted in the area, and making off with everything in sight, including televisions and home appliances.

Since the beginning of the disaster, many civilians denounced the existence of many vandalism groups. These groups started entering abandoned houses and also stole everything, Many special security operations have taken place along the damaged areas of Tabasco. One of the most important actions taken was proposed by Felipe Calderón that consisted to bring military troops together with federal police to the state of Tabasco. This operation was taken in order to prevent looting and vandalism.

"People are going hungry, we're aware of that," Governor Andrés Granier said on television after the looting incident, "but being hungry doesn't justify such behaviour and outright attacks."

== Floods in Tabasco observed from Space ==
The floods that had affected Tabasco were observable from the space, as seen in images from NASA. A system of low pressure was the phenomenon that unleashed strong and constant rains in southern Mexico from 28 October and for several days. The Spectrum-radiometer of Image of Moderate Resolution of the satellite Aqua of NASA took the image of the floods on 3 November 2007.
