= Juan del Grijalva, Chiapas =

Juan del Grijalva
- Location in Mexico
- Coordinates: 17°21′51″N 93°23′0″W
- Country: Mexico
- State: Chiapas
- Municipality: Ostuacan

Population (2005)
  - Total: 416

Juan del Grijalva is a small village (approx. 416 inhabitants ) in the Mexican state of Chiapas. It is part of the Municipality of Ostuacán and is located in the north end of the state on the banks of the Grijalva River, between the Peñitas Dam and the Malpaso Dam.

On November 5, 2007 a landslide from an adjacent hill fell on the Grijalva River, causing a wave of 50 meters of height that struck the town and destroyed all its buildings.

17°21′51″N, 93°23′00″W
