= Sima de las Cotorras =

- Sinkhole of Parrots
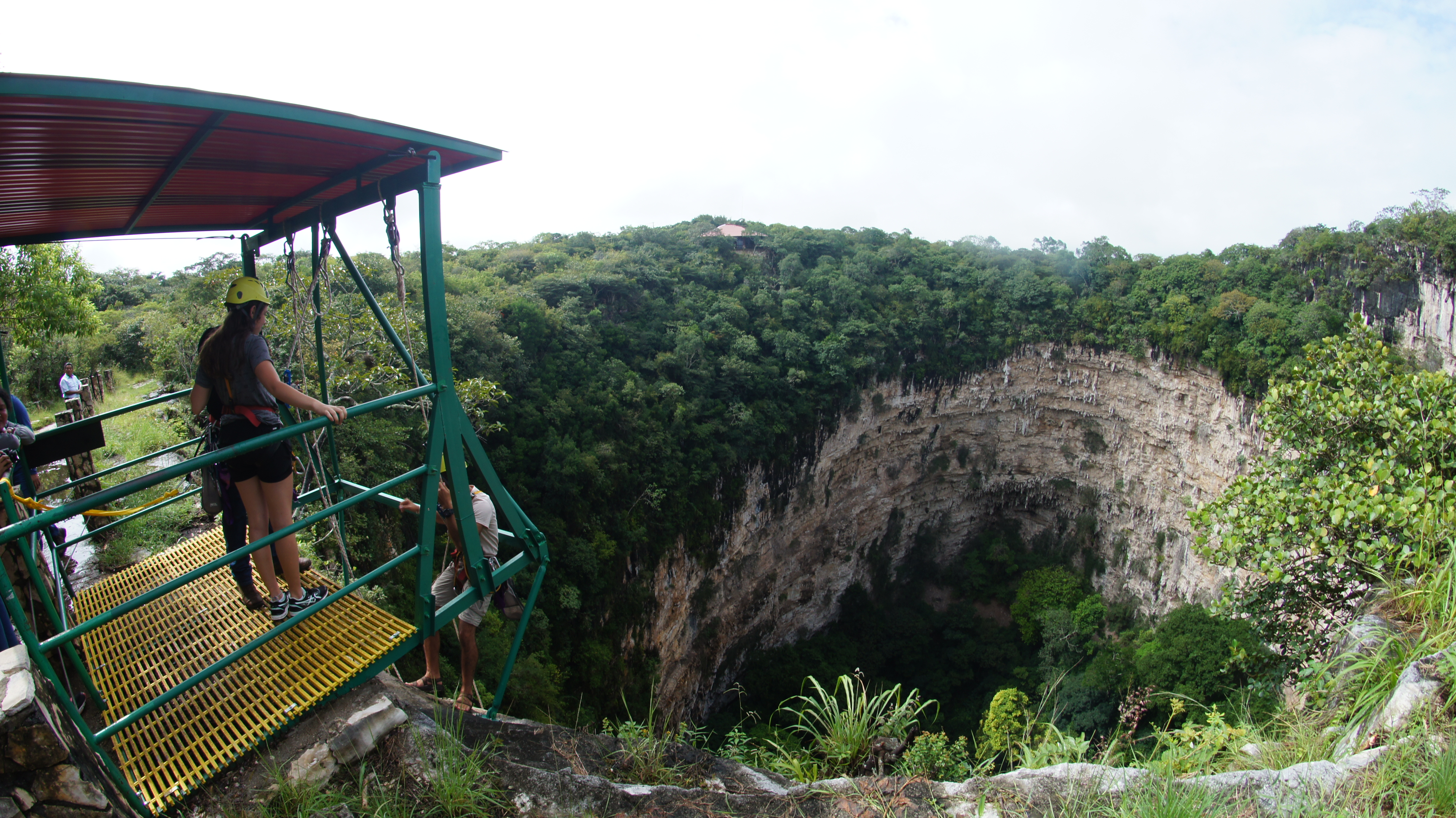
- Interactive map of Sima de las Cotorras
- Location: Ocozocoautla, Chiapas, Mexico
- Coordinates: 16°48′29″N 93°28′28″W
- Depth: 140 metres (460 ft)
- Geology: Limestone
- Hazards: Free fall
- Access: Public
- Features: Green parakeets, Ancient rock paintings

Sima de las Cotorras (in English: Sinkhole of the Parrots/Parakeets) is a sinkhole located in the El Ocote Biosphere Reserve in western Chiapas, southern Mexico. It is one of a number of sinkholes in the area, all produced by tectonic and erosive processes on the region's limestone. Although not the largest and deepest of the area's sinkholes, it is best known because of a tourism project which focuses on the thousands of Mexican green parakeets who live there most of the year, flying in and out in circular patterns.

Sima de Cotorras Ecotourism Center was established in 1985 to give local Zoque families an alternate means of generating income, preserve the local environment and give younger generations a reason to not migrate from the area. The project has built a road, a restaurant and cabins for visitors, and offers rappelling into the sinkhole as well as guided tours to see the cave paintings, the tropical vegetation at the bottom of the formation and the areas around the sinkhole rim. However, most visitors are local and visit for a day only to see the parakeets. The Center has had its problems balancing ecological concerns with keeping it economically viable.

== Location and environment ==
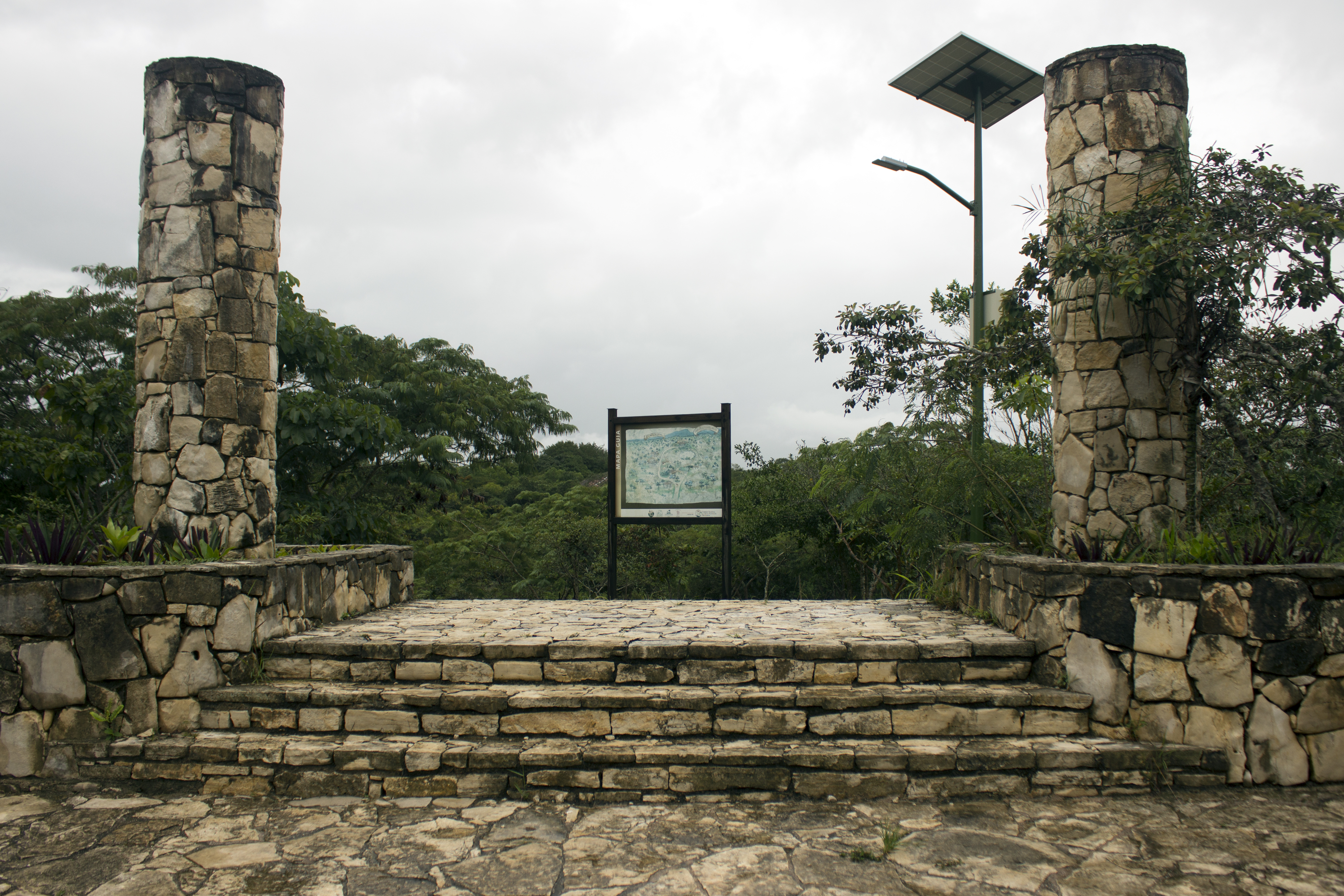
Entrance to ecotourism park

The sinkhole is part of a larger park called El Ocote Biosphere Reserve, located in the western part of the Mexican state of Chiapas, about 90 minutes from the state capital of Tuxtla Gutierrez. It belongs to the municipality of Ocozocoautla de Espinoza, about 19 km over rough roads from the town center. This part of Chiapas is dominated by the Zoque people, who call the area Coita, a Zoque word that means “place of rabbits.” The nearest community to the sinkhole is Piedra Parada, which has about 500 residents.

The climate of the area is mostly warm and humid, with a rainy season from June to October, receiving an average of 1,500mm of precipitation per year. It is in the Sierra Madre de Chiapas, at an altitude of about 820 meters above sea level. This area gets cold enough in the winter to need a light jacket.

Most of the vegetation of the area has been wiped out or severely degraded by agriculture, forestry and other human activity.

== Geology of the sinkhole ==
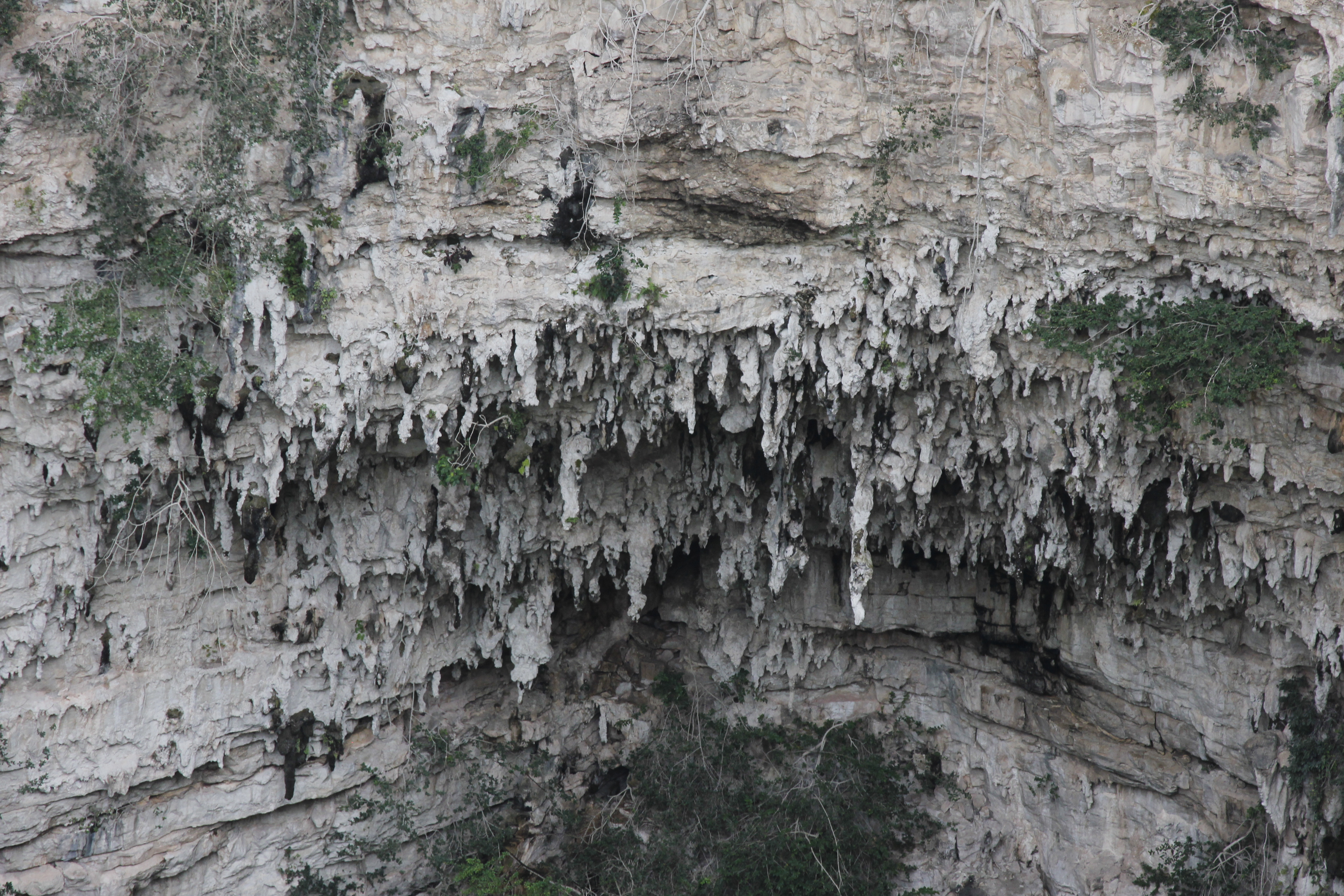
Portion of the wall of the sinkhole showing stalactites

The Sima de las Cotorras belongs to a Karst topography system, based on the folding, fracturing and erosion of limestone. This particular system is defined by its drainage system, with the La Venta River on the surface and the main underground river being El Paraíso. Despite its proximity to the Pacific, drainage is towards the Gulf of Mexico. Most of this ecological system is covered by the El Ocote Biosphere Reserve.

There are two main forces that shape the landscape. Tectonic forces from the movement of the North American plate over the Farallon and Cocos plates creates anticline folds, with a northeasterly orientation. The folding creates cracks in the relatively soft rock and water running above and below erode in and around these fractures. The two processes have created a number of formations including canyons, arches, caves, waterfalls, small pools of water and sinkholes. These same processes make the soil acidic and strewn with loose rock.

Major formations include the La Venta River Canyon, the Arch of Time (Arco del Tiempo) and El Aguacero Falls. The Sima de las Cotorras is only one of 38 sinkholes in the region and one of eight within 10 km^{2}. It is not even the largest of these, being only half the size of the Las Luchas sinkhole.

These sinkholes are vertical depressions formed by the cracking, erosion and collapse of limestone over thousands of years. The Sima de las Cotorras is 140 metres (460 ft) meters deep, and 160 metres (520 ft) in diameter, with a straight drop of 97 metres (318 ft) meters. The opening is elliptical, with the north and southwest rims elevated in relation to the rest. The low point of the rim is in the east. The process reveals the layers of rock, and about 70 metres (230 ft) meters down, stalactites and stalagmites can be seen among the layers from the surface. There are also caves within the sinkhole walls, which have also been produced by erosion. This type of sinkhole is similar to those found in the Yucatán, but in general these do not contain pooled water at the bottom.

== Biology of the sinkhole ==
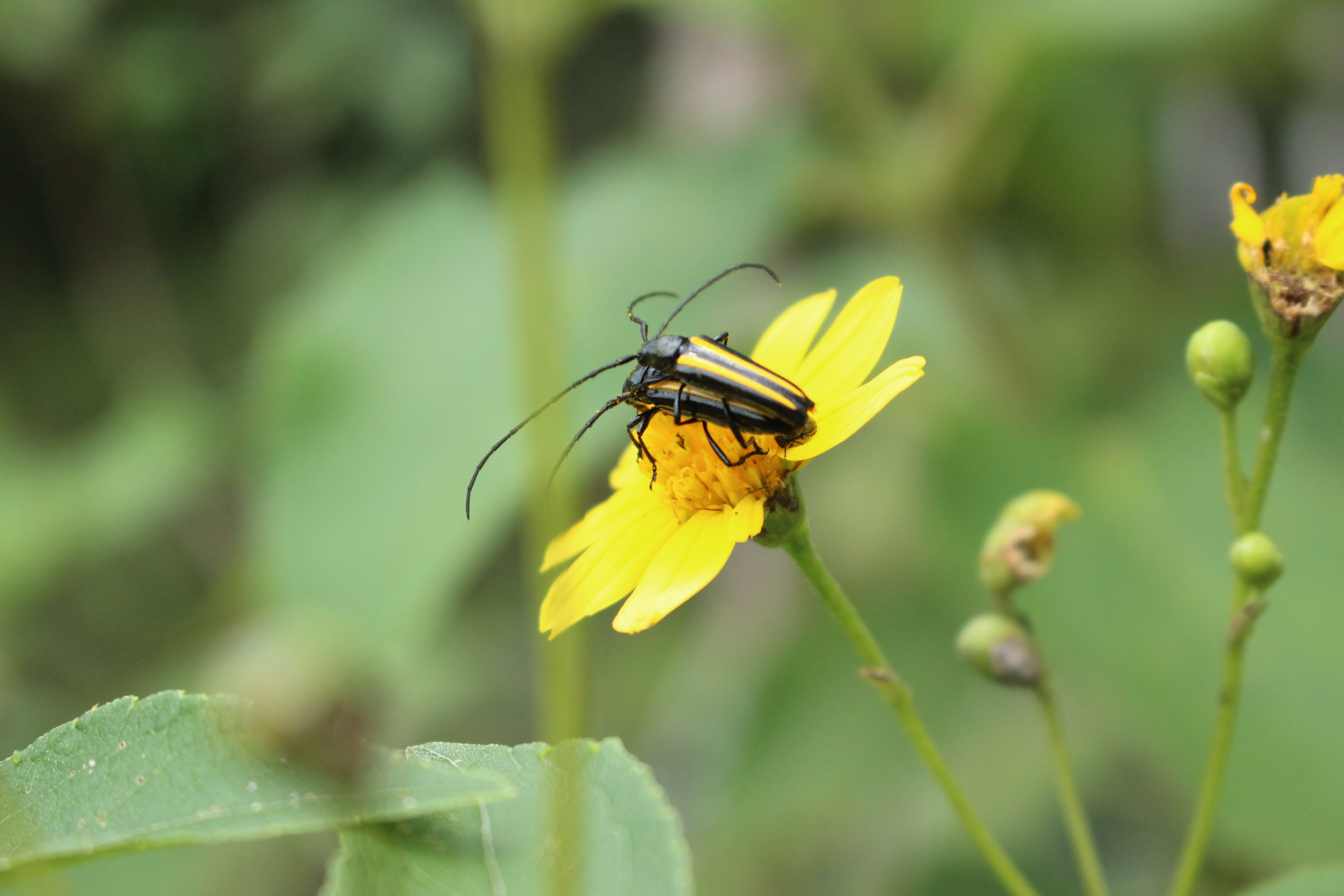
Two beetles mating on a flower on the park.

Instead the interior of the sinkhole is home to a tropical forest, whose plant and animal life is distinct from that of the surrounding ecosystem.

El Ocote is home to a number of endangered species, especially birds such as Psittacara holochlorus, Amazilia viridifons and Oporornis tolmiei, as well as other receiving special protection such as Eucometis penicillata, Lanio aurantius, Psarocolius montezuma and Colinus virginianus. Numbers and types of birds present depends on the time of year, due to migratory patterns.

The wider reserve serves as a buffer area for the microclimate of the Sima de las Cotorras. Outside the sinkhole and up to its rim, the climate is drier, mostly grassland/shrub from cattle grazing, and areas called lomería, rocky areas with limited growth, mostly shrubs, due to dense limestone. In some of the higher elevations there are still some forests. Around the sinkhole itself, there are many copal trees, Protium copal (family Burseraceae), which gave the sinkhole its original name of Sima del Copal.

The interior of the sinkhole holds and preserves more moisture. From its bottom grows a tropical deciduous rainforest microsystem with broadleafed species such as cedar, mahogany, Fabaceas espinosa and Burseraceas baja, Manilkara zapota, scrubs of the family Guaiacum and more, with trees reaching as high as 30 meters tall. The plant species here are not found outside the sinkhole.

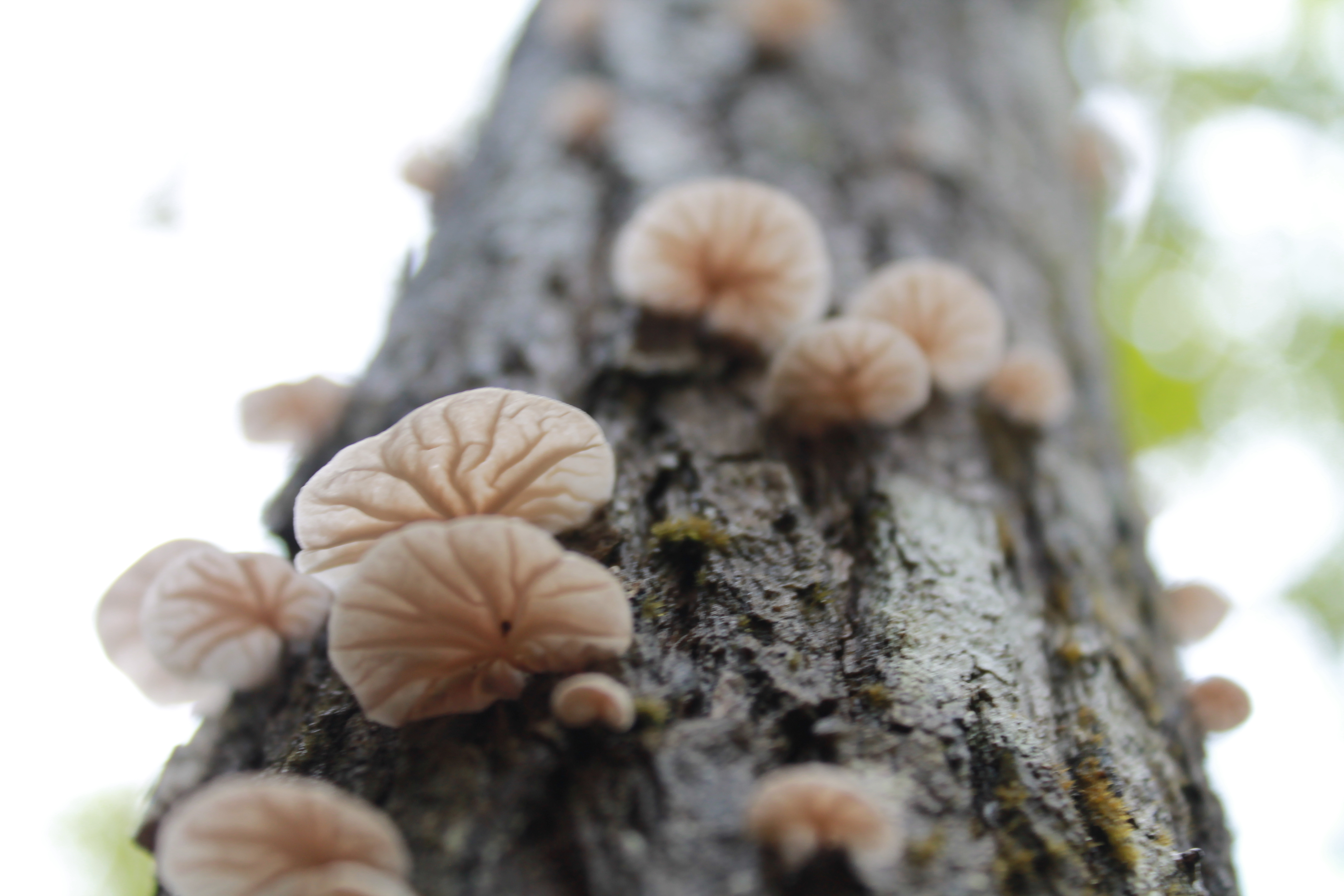
Fungi in rainy season

Common reserve fauna includes owls, foxes and coyotes, rabbits, opossums, badgers, squirrels, armadillos, Penelopina nigra, chachalacas and of course, parakeets. The park has over 80 bird species in 30 families. Eleven of these are migratory and three are endemic to the area. Seven bird species are classified as endangered by the Mexican government. Most of the bird species 35 of them, are found in the low deciduous rainforest of the sinkholes. These include species which are highly sensitive to human intrusion such as Colinus virginianus, Caprimulgus vociferous, Amazilia candida and Ortalis vetula. A number of bird species have been found in the Sima de las Cotorras area but not in the larger El Ocote park, including Bubo virginianus, Ramosomyia viridifrons, Vireo philadelphicus, Sialia sialis, Passerina versicolor and Cacicus melanicterus.

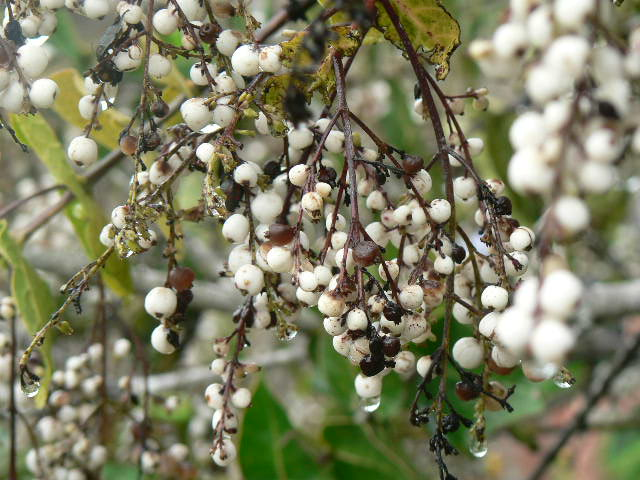
Gulambere on Sima de las cotorras.

The Sima's most famous resident is Psittacara holochlorus, the Mexican parrot, which is endangered. Chiapas is home to over 68% of Mexico's parrots (family Psittacidae). And many of Mexico's parrot species are endangered, mostly due to shrinking habitat, along with the illegal pet trade and other exploitation of the animals. There are an estimated 3,000 parrots associated with the sinkhole and they can be found there most of the year, with the exception November to January, when the weather is too cool for them. The forest of the sinkhole is also their nesting site. From the evening until the early morning, the parrots are congregated in the sinkhole forest, where the noise they make can be quite loud. The parrots’ noise will cease if a predator such as a falcon is seen nearby. The parrots leave the sinkhole to look for food, which includes from mango trees in people's backyards as far away as Tuxtla Gutierrez. They leave the sinkhole in groups, flying in circles on wind currents in order to leave and enter. Inside the sinkhole, the parrots are the most numerous kind of bird. Outside, it is dominated by small birds of the family Tyrannidae.

== Archeological site ==
Evidence of human habitation in the area goes back at least 7,500 years, with evidence of hunter/gatherers. However, there were no major pre-Hispanic settlements in this area. The area of the park was first explored and academically documented in the mid 20th century, noting local caves and archeological finds such as pottery. But documentation still remains sparse especially in comparison to other such sites in Mexico.

The significant archeological find in and around the Sima de las Cotorras are cave paintings, arrowheads, and much later pottery shards, possibly Zoque. The most important of these are the cave paintings, which number about 75. On a rock outcropping on the north wall, there is a human figure with lance, and with a sun and moon above. One of the side caves has on its roof the outlines of hands made by blowing red ochre onto the wall. Other images include circles, spirals and animals. The appearance of cave painting in such a geological formation and especially so high up the sinkhole walls makes them a rarity, and the site is under consideration by UNESCO for protective status.

== Ecological park ==
The El Ocote Biosphere Reserve was established in 1972, extendingover 8 hectares, protecting over a hundred species of birds, and dozens of mammals, reptiles and insects, some endangered. With the exception of the Sima de la Cotorras, the park has not been developed for tourism, and its formations are almost completely unknown outside of their region. The other sinkholes in the area get no tourism activity at all. The tourism activity based on the flight of the parrots has made the sinkhole relatively famous and it is now better known as the “sinkhole of the parrots” rather than its official name.

Tourism activity here began with the establishment of the Sima de Cotorras Ecotourism Center in 1985 and the building of a road from the town of Ocozocoautla to the site. The center was established to provide alternative work for the local Zoque people. Today it is run by the Tzamanguimó cooperative, which consists of a number of families all from the nearby community of Piedra Parada.

The project is also registered with the federal government as an ecotourism site, with the aim of being sustainable, providing income for local residents with minimal impact. The group welcomes researchers as well as visitors onto the site. The main challenge has been how to take advantage of the site without damaging it. The ground is unstable and highly porous. Many underground cavities are still unknown, making building risky. The largest structure on the premises is the restaurant. Built near the rim, its site was chosen because of the stability of the rock, not because it was the most aesthetically pleasing place to put the structure. Waste disposal is a main issue because of the threat of groundwater contamination, prompting several composting activities. Bringing water, electricity and more are also challenges.

By far the main attraction of the site are the parrots that fly in and out of sinkhole each day, generally leaving in the early morning and returning at night. It is also possible to rappel to the bottom of the sinkhole, as well as explore local caves and hike both in and around the sinkhole.

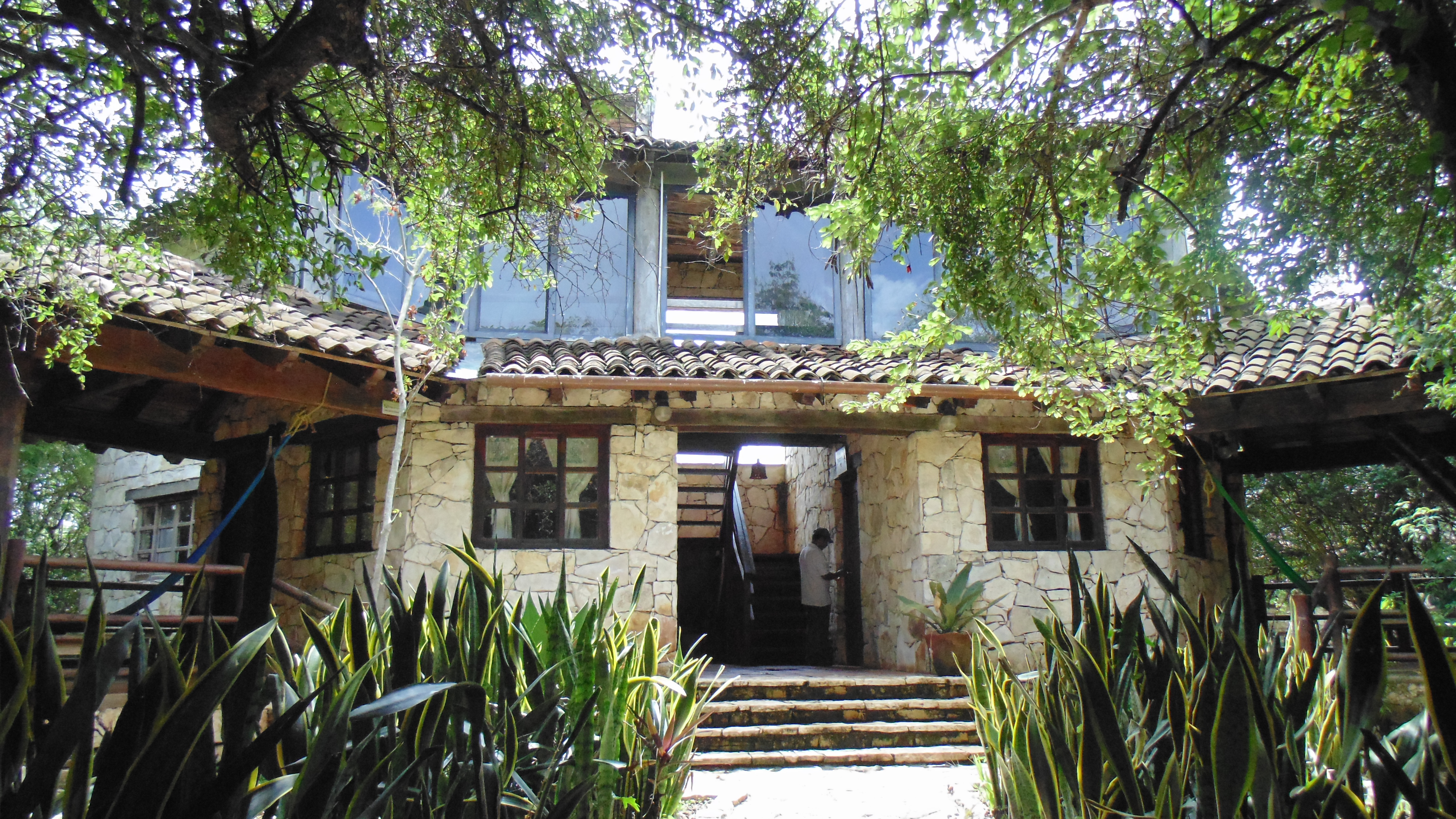
Facade of the cabins for visitors, inside the ecological park of Sima de las Cotorras.

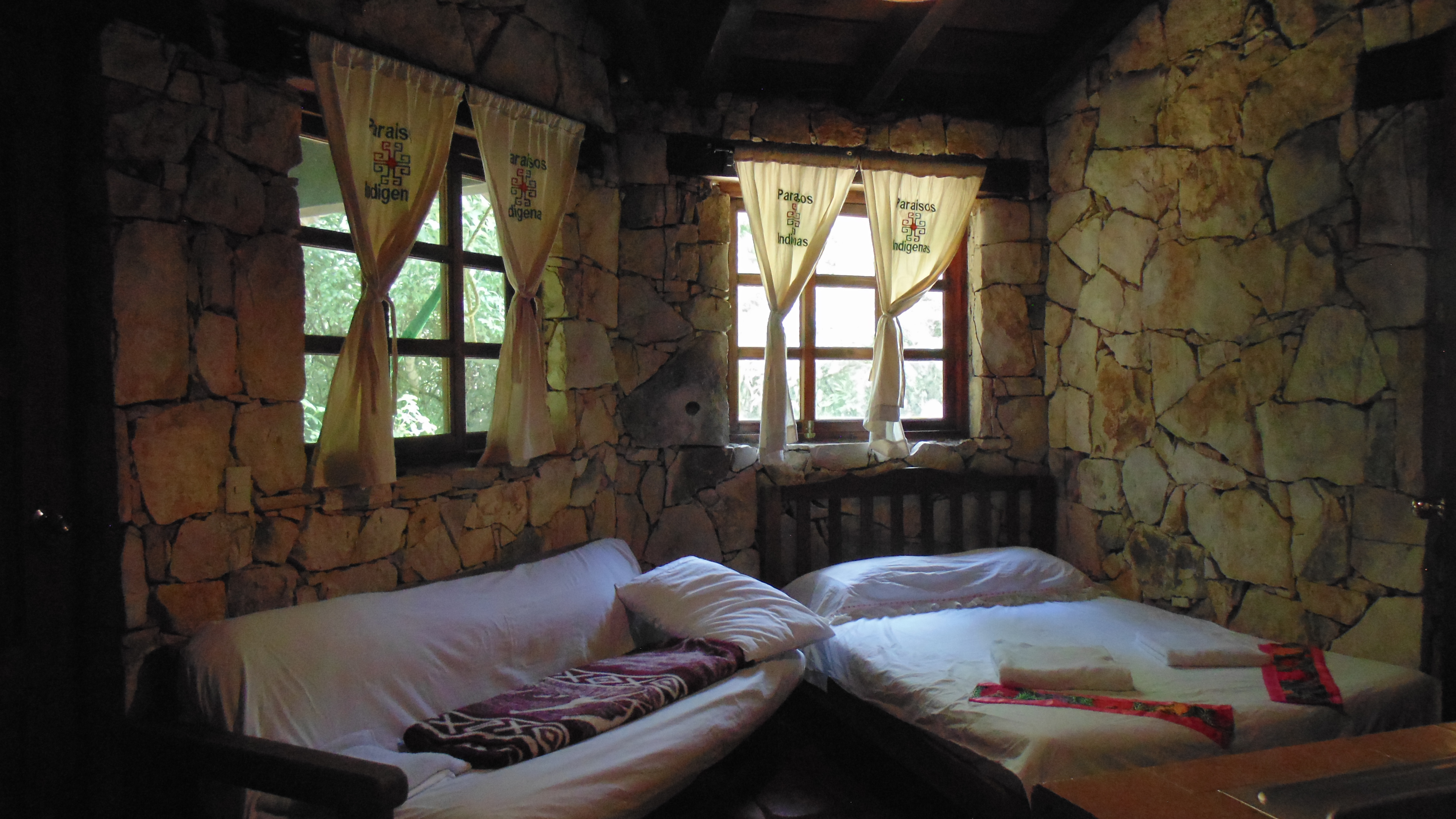
Interior overview of the cabins inside the ecological park of Sima de las Cotorras.

Where possible constructions are based on local materials to allow them to blend into the local environment. Paving and path construction is based on local rock. Pre Hispanic architecture formed the basis of the buildings on the site, including the rock foundation seen on the restaurant building. The Center has eight cabins for up to five persons each, a camping area and tours with local guides.

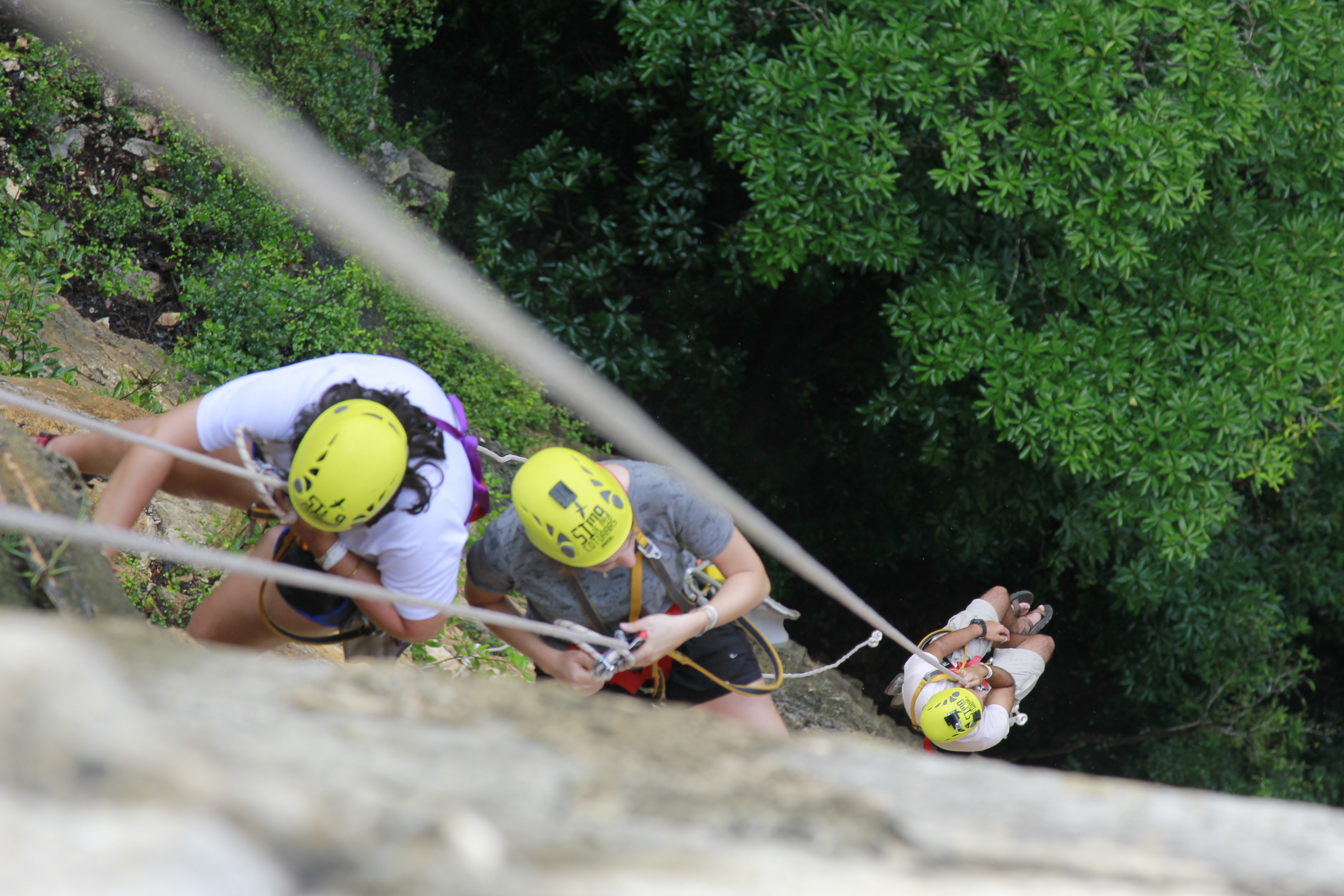
Tourists practicing rappel, descending from Sima de las Cotorras.

It has eight cabins which can house five people each. It currently has a restaurant, several cabins to house multiple people, a camping área, a path around the rim of the sinkhole, rappelling and tours to see the cave paintings and the rainforest that covers the sinkhole's floor.

The Center has provided an alternative source of work other than agriculture and for some, a means for income when before they had none. Despite this, the project has not been claimed as a great success. According to theses done at the Universidad Intercultural de Chiapas, the tourism possibilities here have not been fully exploited. As of 2016, only about 10 to 15 people per day visit the site. Most visitors come by their own cars or through local ecoadventure tourism agencies. Most tourists are between 41–60 years of age, followed by the 31-40 age bracket and those in the 18-30 year bracket. About half come from the state capital of Tuxtla Gutierrez, with about 13% from Mexico City, 12.5 from other parts of Mexico. Only about 2 percent are foreigners.

The main problems for the site are the lack of promotion and poor access. The roads leading to the site are very poor, especially the last ten km, and signage is poor or non-existent. The park is difficult to access for those with disabilities. Most visitors learn of the site through word-of-mouth, with some from television and much fewer from other media. The lack of services means that those who do come do not stay for long. Two-thirds come only to see the parrots, some will stay and eat at the restaurant, but very few stay the night.

The project over the years has received intermittent support from various government institutions such as PEMEX, the Secretary of Tourism, SEMARNAT and the Comision Nacional para el Desarrollo de los Pueblos Indígenas, in areas such as finance, customer service and construction. But these interventions have not always been helpful, with functionaries using technical jargon and dismissing local knowledge of the area. Changes in political parties has led to varying attitudes towards the project and its ecological focus, with errors being made such as cutting down trees to make way for cement electrical poles and the construction on non-composting toilets.

At its height, the Center generated about 80 to 100 jobs directly, but since the tourist demand has declined. The project is specifically geared to keep young people in the area, but they have not shown sufficient interest in its continuation. Most members of the cooperative are between 50 and 80 years of age. Only about 30% of the local population recognizes the area's intangible value, but 80% favor efforts to make the area better known. Even with sufficient interest and promotion, the area is not suited for large-scale tourism. One reason is the need to keep ecological concerns first and the other is that alternative and eco-tourism are not major attractions for most Mexicans.

== See also ==
- List of sinkholes of Mexico
