= Peñitas Dam =

- Location within Mexico
- Coordinates: 17°26′46″N 93°27′30″W
- Construction began: 1979
- Opening date: 1986

Reservoir
- Creates: Peñitas Reservoir
- Total capacity: 396,000,000 m^{3} (321,042 acre⋅ft)

Power Station
- Commission date: 1987
- Turbines: 4 x 105 MW
- Installed capacity: 420 MW
- Annual generation: 2.035 TWh

The Peñitas Dam, also known as Ángel Albino Corzo, is a dam with a hydro-electric power station on the river Rio Grijalva, 83 km south west of the city of Villahermosa, lying in the municipality of Ostuacán in the state of Chiapas in southern Mexico. The power station has an installed production effect of 420 MW from four turbines, and an annual production of 2.035 TWh.

== History ==
Construction on the dam began in 1979 and the river was diverted in October 1983. In June 1986, the dam structure was completed along with the right spillway and by July of that year, the dam began to impound its reservoir. By August, the spillway was tested; the left spillway would not be completed until July 1987. The dam's first generator was commissioned in January 1987 and the last on 15 September of the same year. Floods in 1999 and 2007 tested the limited flood protection of the dam as the Tabasco Flatlands were flooded and over one million residents were affected. The Government of Mexico has initiated a project to expand the flood capacity of the dam which was still in planning stages in 2008. Floods in November 2020 killed twenty and left 184,000 homeless in Tabasco, Chiapas, Veracruz, and Quintana Roo.

In the Rio Griljava-Mexcalapa watercourse are installed a hydro-electric power capacity of 4,750 MW with an annual capacity of almost 15 TWh. The power stations are:

- La Angostura Dam Belisario Domínguez - 900 MW, 2.03 TWh
- Chicoasén Dam Manuel Moreno Torres - 2 350 MW, 6.0 TWh
- Malpaso Dam Netzahualcóyotl - 1 080 MW, 3.0 TWh
- Peñitas Dam Angel Albino Corzo - 420 MW, 1.45 TWh
