= La Venta River =

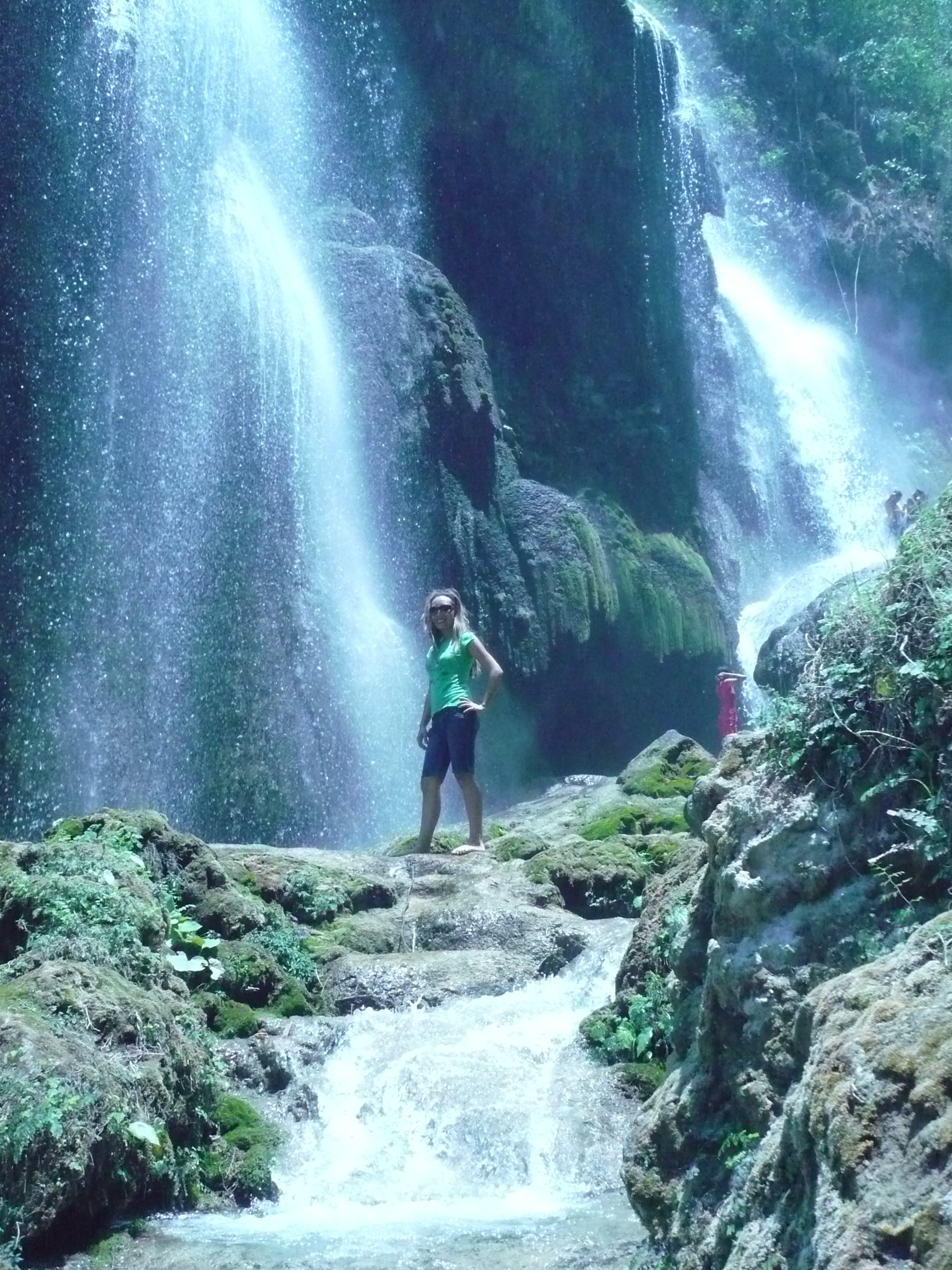
- Aguacero waterfall, La Venta canyon, Ocozocuautla, Chiapas

Location
- Country: Mexico

Physical characteristics
- Mouth
  - location: Grijalva River, now Malpaso Reservoir

The La Venta River is a river of Chiapas state in southern Mexico. It is a tributary of the Grijalva River.

The La Venta River runs through a canyon 84 km in length, with limestone canyon walls soaring up to 500 meters above the river. The porous limestone has eroded into karst landscape, with sinkholes, fissures, dolines and caverns. These include the cavern called the Arch of Time (El Arco del Tiempo), which opens directly onto the river.

The La Venta canyon is within the Selva El Ocote Biosphere Reserve.

== See also ==
- List of rivers of Mexico
