= Chiapas Bridge =

Bridge in Chiapas, Mexico

Coordinates: 17.139°N 93.593°W

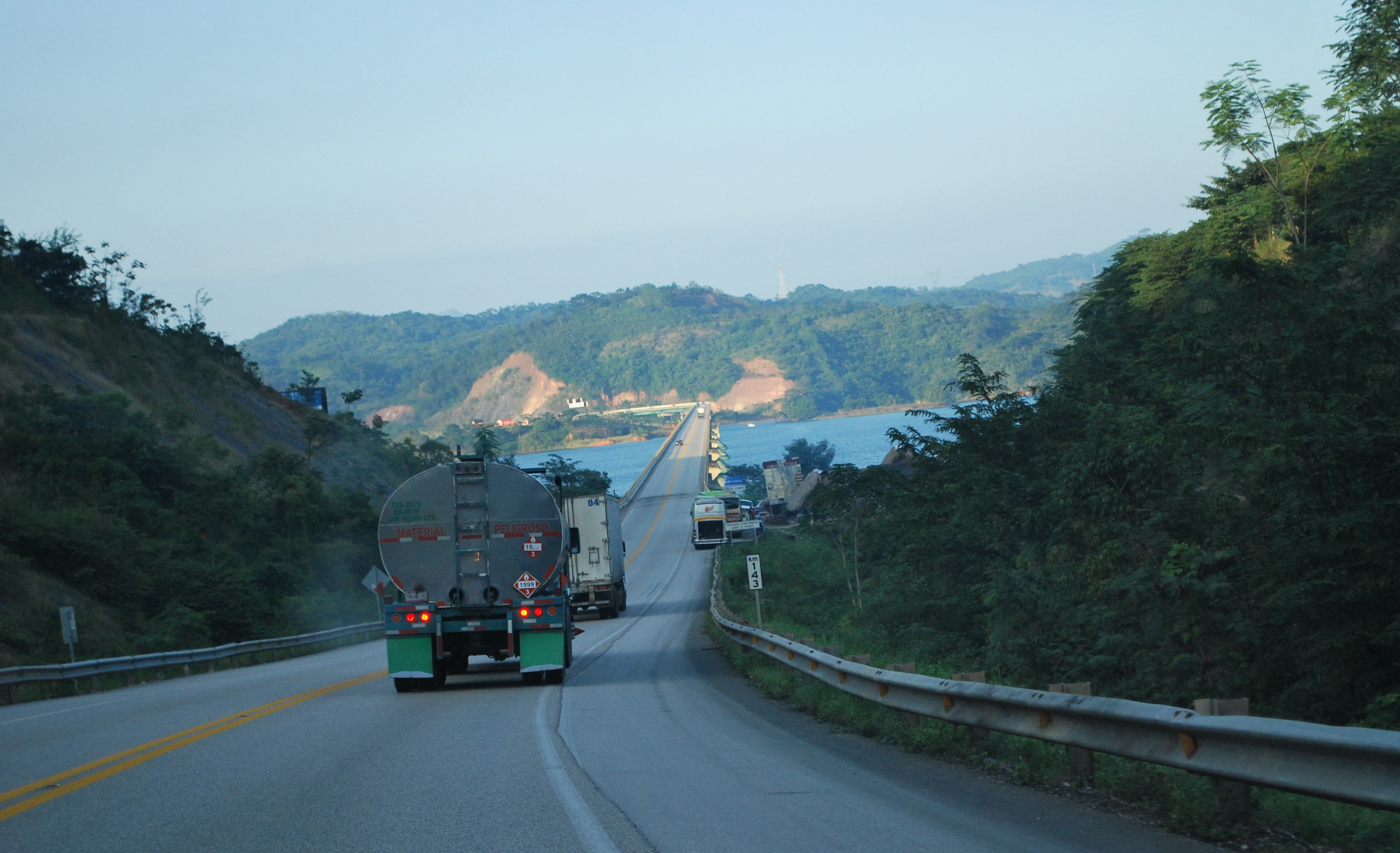
View of the Chiapas Bridge

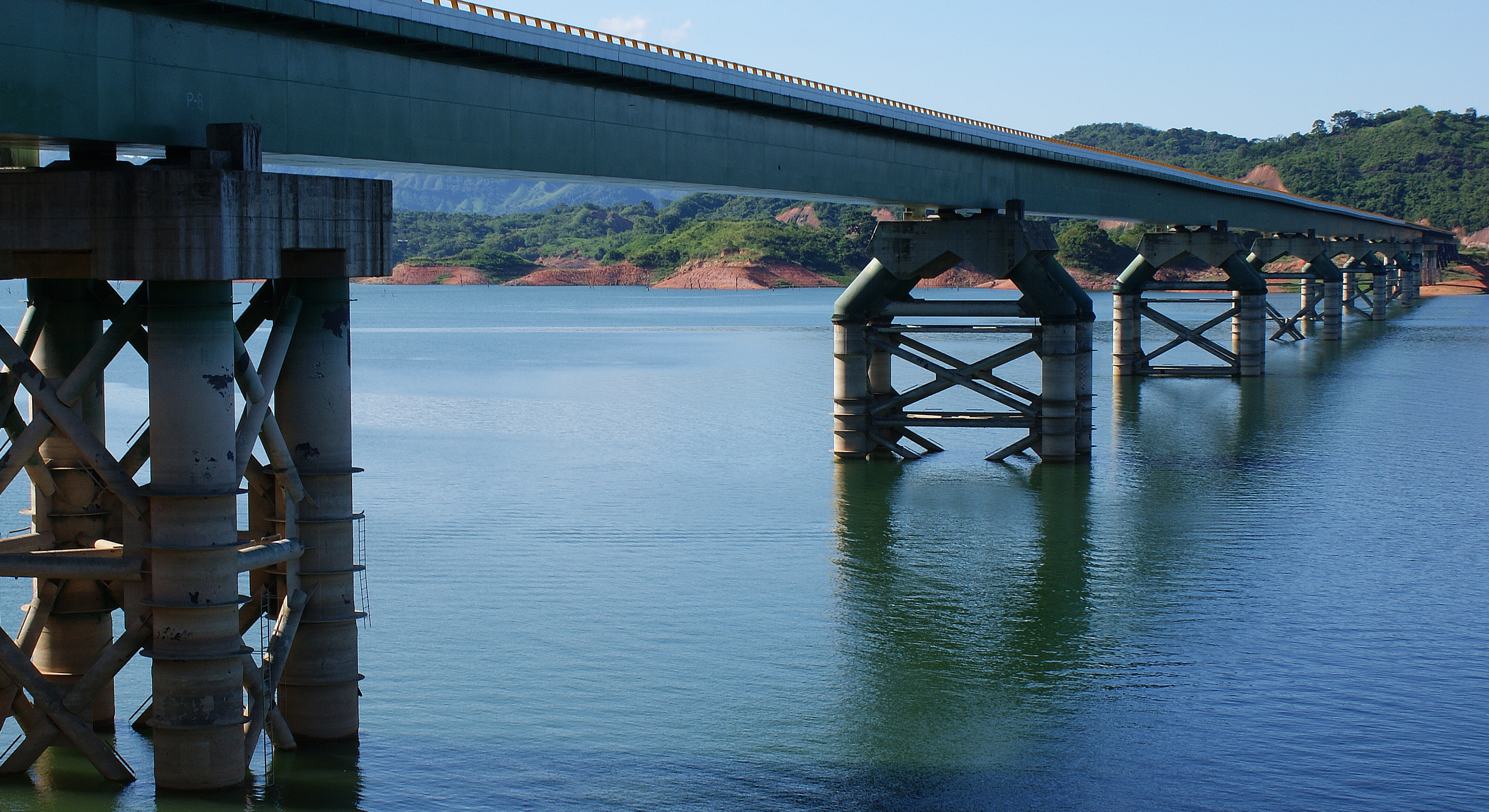
Chiapas Bridge

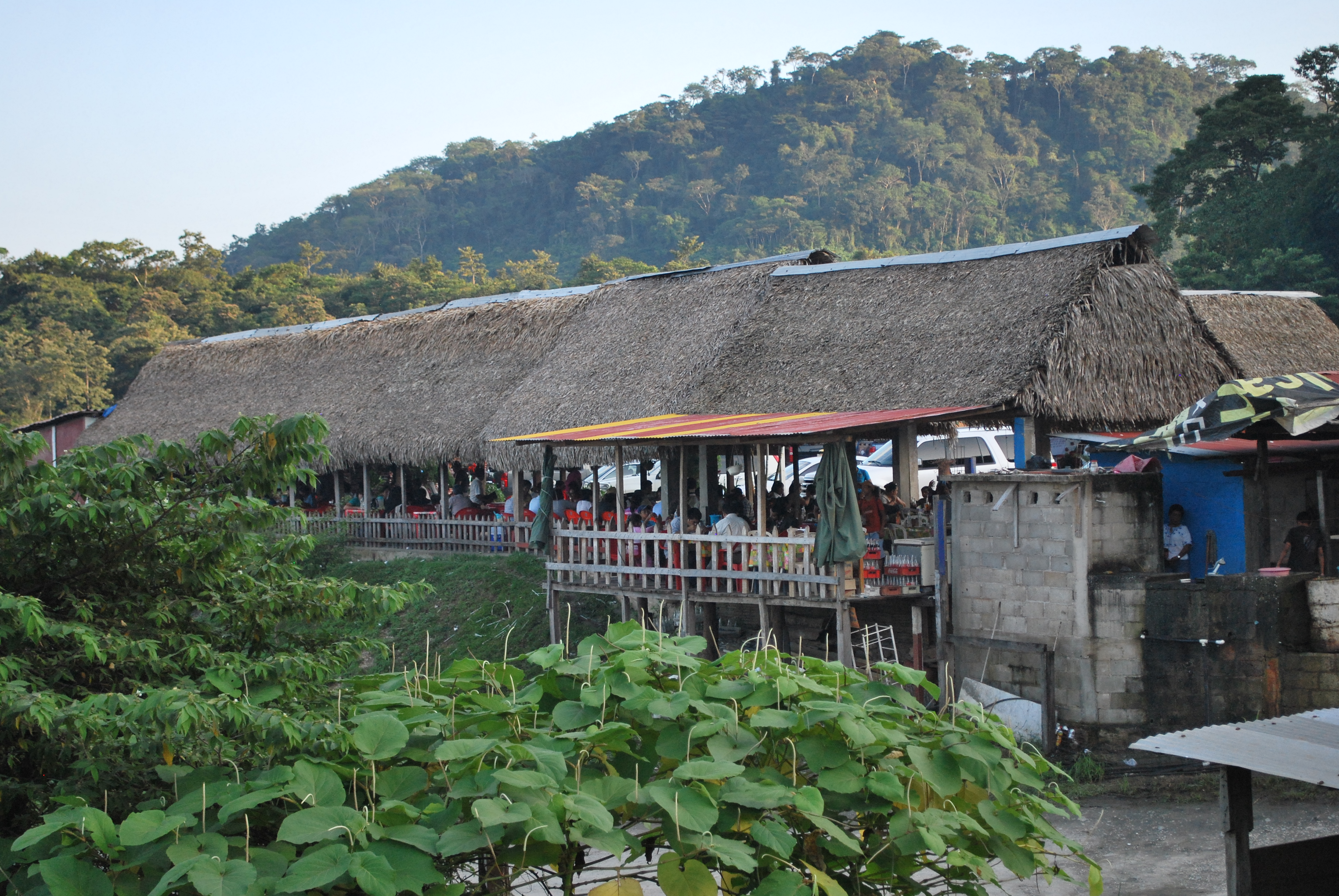
View of one of the restaurants next to the bridge

The Chiapas Bridge (Spanish: Puente Chiapas) is a steel bridge over a kilometer in length which spans the Nezahualcoyotl or Malpaso Dam in northern Chiapas, Mexico. Construction of the bridge began in 2002 and finished fourteen months later, voted the best infrastructure project in Mexico in 2004. The bridge and the highway it is part of cuts driving time from Mexico City to the state capital by 3.5 hours and makes the rural area in northern Chiapas more accessible and open to ecotourism.

== Highway ==
The bridge was built by the Secretaria de Comunicaciones y Transportes as part of an upgrade in the highway system designed to integrate the state of Chiapas more into the rest of the country. The highway links Las Choapas in southern Veracruz to Tuxtla Gutiérrez. The new road cuts 3.5 hours off the drive from Mexico City to Tuxtla Gutierrez, and the reduced the driving distance over 100 km to 861 km. It also allows the north of Chiapas near Veracruz and Tabasco to be more accessible.

== Bridge construction ==
The decision to build the bridge was made in 2002 and the project lasted fourteen months with inauguration occurring in December 2003. The bridge stretches 1,208 meters over a section of the Nezahualcoyotl or Malpaso reservoir. The bridge is ten meters wide, with eight supports, seven pillars or "jackets" and one strip of concrete fastened onto solid land. The upper part of the bridge is made of orthotropic materials with 102 metal voussoirs which weigh 8,900 tons with an average weight of eight tons per meter. The total amount of steel used s over 19,000 tons, the equivalent of four ocean platforms. It was selected as the best infrastructure project in Mexico in 2004.

== Ecotourism ==
The construction of the highway and bridge has allowed for the development of ecotourism in the area. The bridge itself is in the Ocozocoautla municipality, which has a significant population of Tzotzil people. It is also within the El Ocote Biosphere Reserve, which is mostly tall growth rainforest. This is one of the most important in southern Mexico due to the size and biological diversity. The center of this ecotourism is a center located on one side of the bridge, along the banks of the reservoir. It offers boat tours, hiking, horseback riding and camping, along with a number of restaurants for passers-by featuring fish from the area.
