= Temple of Santiago (Chiapas, Mexico) =

Temple of Santiago (or Temple of Quechula)
- Templo de Santiago (ó Templo de Quechula)
- Location: Chiapas
- Country: Mexico
- Denomination: Roman Catholic

History
- Founder(s): Fr. Bartolomé de las Casas, OP

Architecture
- Functional status: Abandoned
- Years built: Mid-1500s
- Closed: 1773

Specifications
- Length: 61 mts.
- Width: 14 mts.
- Height: 10 mts.

Administration
- Diocese: Diocese of Chiapas

The Temple of Santiago, also known as the Temple of Quechula, is an abandoned Roman Catholic church located in the Nezahualcoyotl Reservoir in Chiapas, Mexico. It was founded by Dominican friars led by Bartolomé de las Casas, the famous social reformer.

== History ==
=== Colonial times ===
In 1564, the Dominican friar and social reformer Bartolomé de las Casas and his fellow monks founded a monastery in Tecpatán, in what is now the Mexican State of Chiapas. Based on the architectural similarities, the Temple of Santiago is believed to have been constructed by the same builders. At the time, the church served a much smaller congregation than it could handle, and was designed in preparation for large population growth. Carlos Navarrete, an architect who worked on a Mexican government report of the church, told the Associated Press:

It was a church built thinking that this could be a great population center, but it never achieved that. It probably never even had a dedicated priest, only receiving visits from those from Tecpatan.

Navarrete reported that the church was abandoned during the 1773–76 smallpox epidemic. He wrote about the time of the report:

At that time, we still found the wood from the chorus loft and the roof beams. Also, a large ossuary of the victims of the plague that depopulated the area.

After its abandonment, the church was never used for ecclesiastical purposes again.

=== Submersion ===
In 1966, the Nezahualcoyotl Reservoir was completed from the construction of the Malpaso Dam, and the Temple of Santiago was completely submerged. It has reappeared periodically, at times when the reservoir water levels have dropped, the first recorded such time being in 2002. That time, the water levels were so low that the church floor was dry, and local people visited it to hold parties. In 2015, the Temple reappeared again, after water levels dropped more than 80 feet during a drought, although this time the church was still partially submerged, local fishermen began operating boat tours to the site. In 2023, it reappeared again completely.
