= Malpaso Dam =

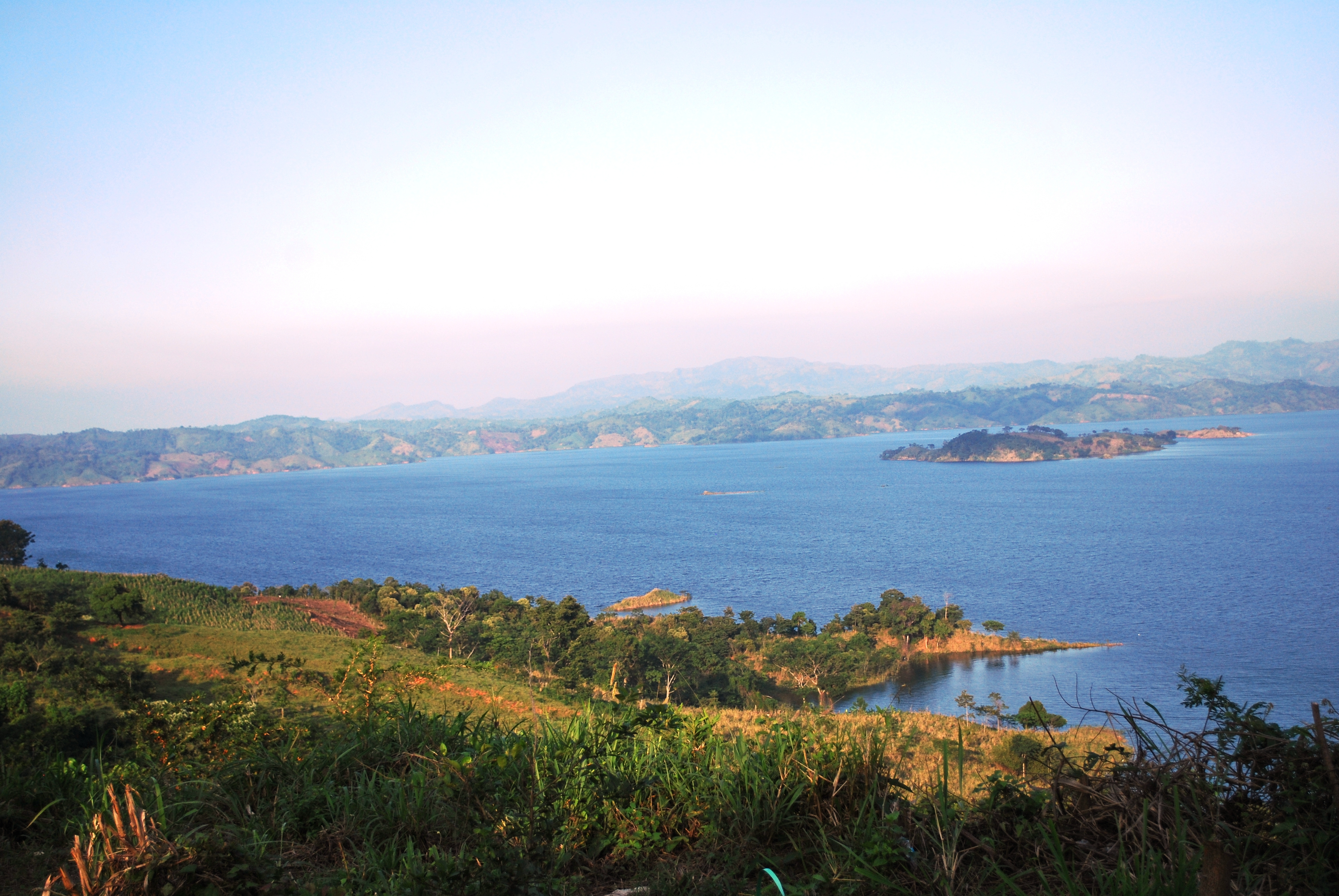
- view of the reservoir

- Location within Mexico
- Official name: Represa de Malpaso
- Country: Mexico
- Location: Tecpatán, Chiapas
- Coordinates: 17°10′43″N 93°35′54″W
- Status: In use
- Construction began: 1958
- Opening date: 1966
- Owner: Comisión Federal de Electricidad

Dam and spillways
- Type of dam: Embankment
- Impounds: Grijalva River
- Height: 137.5 m (451 ft)
- Length: 480 m (1,575 ft)

Reservoir
- Total capacity: 10,596,000,000 m^{3} (8,590,317 acre⋅ft)
- Active capacity: 9,600,000,000 m^{3} (7,782,847 acre⋅ft)
- Surface area: 381 km^{2} (147 mi^{2})

Power Station
- Commission date: 1969-1977
- Turbines: 6 x 180 MW Francis-type
- Installed capacity: 1,080 MW

The Malpaso Dam, officially known as the Nezahualcóyotl Dam, is located in the Centro region of the Mexican state of Chiapas, near the border with Tabasco and Veracruz. It was the first of several major dams built on the Grijalva River to generate hydroelectric energy and has the second largest reservoir in Mexico, after the Belisario Domínguez Dam. Construction of the dam occurred in the 1960s and flooded not only the riverbed but also hectares of rainforest and farmland, various towns and villages and archeological sites. These include the former town of Quechula, whose 16th century Dominican church will appear when water is at low levels, and the archeological site of San Isidro which contains one of only two known double Mesoamerican ball courts. Commissioning of the dam's 1,080 MW power station began in 1969 and ended in 1977. The reservoir and later construction of a federal highway has spurred ecotourism in the area.

== Reservoir and its surroundings ==
Malpaso is one of several on the Grijalva River in Chiapas, along with the Chicoasén, Peñitas, and Belisario Dominguez (La Angostura). The Nezahualcoyotl is the second largest reservoir in Mexico after the Belisario Dominguez, covering an area of 995,000 hectares and with a maximum storage capacity of 9,750 million meters cubed. The dam mostly exists to power one of the largest hydroelectric complexes in Mexico. It is managed by the Comité Técnico de Operación de Obras Hidráulicas which is made up of the Comisión Federal de Electricidad, Conagua and the Engineering Institute of the Universidad Nacional Autónoma de México (UNAM) among others.

There is an overlook set up to get a panoramic view of the reservoir and surroundings. The dam and reservoir are located in the mountainous Centro region of the state, mostly in the municipalities of Tecpatán with some in Ocozocoautla, 139 km northwest of Tuxtla Gutiérrez. The area has a hot and humid climate with most rain occurring between June and November, which are also the hottest months as well. The average annual temperature is 25C. The area ecology is mostly tall growth rainforest and most belongs to the Selva El Ocote Biosphere Reserve. The area is considered to be Zoque territory but there are communities of Tzotzils as well.

== Construction ==
Construction of the dam began in 1959 with most completed by 1964 and final containment of the reservoir completed in 1966. It was built by Cía Raudales, a consortium of seven companies. Construction was undertaken in four main phases, with the river diverted through tunnels on both sides of its normal course. The first stage built five tunnels as well as an access bridge on one side. In the second stage, the river was diverted into these tunnels by blocking its normal course to allow construction of the dam. In the third phase, the dam structure was built, finished in 1964 and the closing the tunnels was begun. In the last stage the final tunnels were closed and the reservoir completely sealed by the dam.

The resulting reservoir not only covered the rapids of this area of the Grijalva River, but also fresh water and thermal springs, rainforest, animal habitat, farmland, archeological sites and various towns and villages, with the most significant being Quechula. Quechula was a Zoque dominion when the Spanish arrived in 1524. The Dominicans built a church here, the Temple of Santiago, starting in 1564, which was submerged with the rest of the town after construction of the dam. However, each year during the dry season, at least part of this structure reappears when water levels are low. Most of the building's walls have collapsed but the wall with the bell gable remains. This first time this occurred, local residents decided to hold mass in the old town. The reappearance of the church still brings visitors to the area. The creation of the dam forced the relocation of hundreds of families in the area with most moved to a community called Nuevo Quechula.

Before the building of the dam, the area was surveyed by the Proyecto de Salvamento Arqueologico (Archeological Salvage Project) . One of the major finds from this period is the site of San Isidro with its Mesoamerican ball court in 1965. The San Isidro site is located at the former conjunction of the Grijalva and La Venta Rivers. Its ball court is significant because it is double, with a nearly square space of eighty by sixty meters, bordered by the traditional sloped walls. In the center of the space is a division making two sub-courts. Today this site is under the waters of the reservoir.

== Flood control issues ==
The area is hot and humid with large quantities of rainfall which mostly comes in from the Gulf of Mexico through the state of Tabasco. Precipitation in the area is also strongly affected by the weather phenomena of El Niño and La Niña which can significantly raise or lower reservoir levels and the amount of water which flows out of them through the dams. Malpaso is the closest large dam to the flat floodplains of Tabasco, with only the smaller Peñitas closer.

These two dams serve as a means to control flooding of the river as it heads into Tabasco state, but when reservoirs are dangerously full, it becomes necessary to release large quantities of water. This most often occurs in late summer and fall, when rains are heaviest. This water heads to the flat slow draining floodplains of Tabasco, including its capital of Villahermosa and has cause serious flooding problems. In 1970, the silting basin was severely damaged during a flood 20% less than the design capacity. Pressure fluctuations caused the stone slabs to detach from their anchor. The last major floodings related to the Malpaso dam occurred in 2007 and 2008. Unusually heavy rain not only filled the dam to over capacity, flooding about 400 towns around the area in 2007. In 2008, Twenty two communities in the dam area were flooded and when the water finally flowed freely again, major flooding occurred in Tabasco, especially in Nacajuca. In 2008, Comisión Federal de Electricidad, the dam's owner, shut down operations at the dam to complete the second stage on a canal project designed to alleviate storage in the dam's reservoir. The canal's construction occurred in three stages and it was dug through a mud slide in between the dam and the Peñitas Dam downstream. At the end of the third stage, the canal will be able to pass 3,500 m^{3}/s (123,601 cu ft/s).

== Ecotourism ==
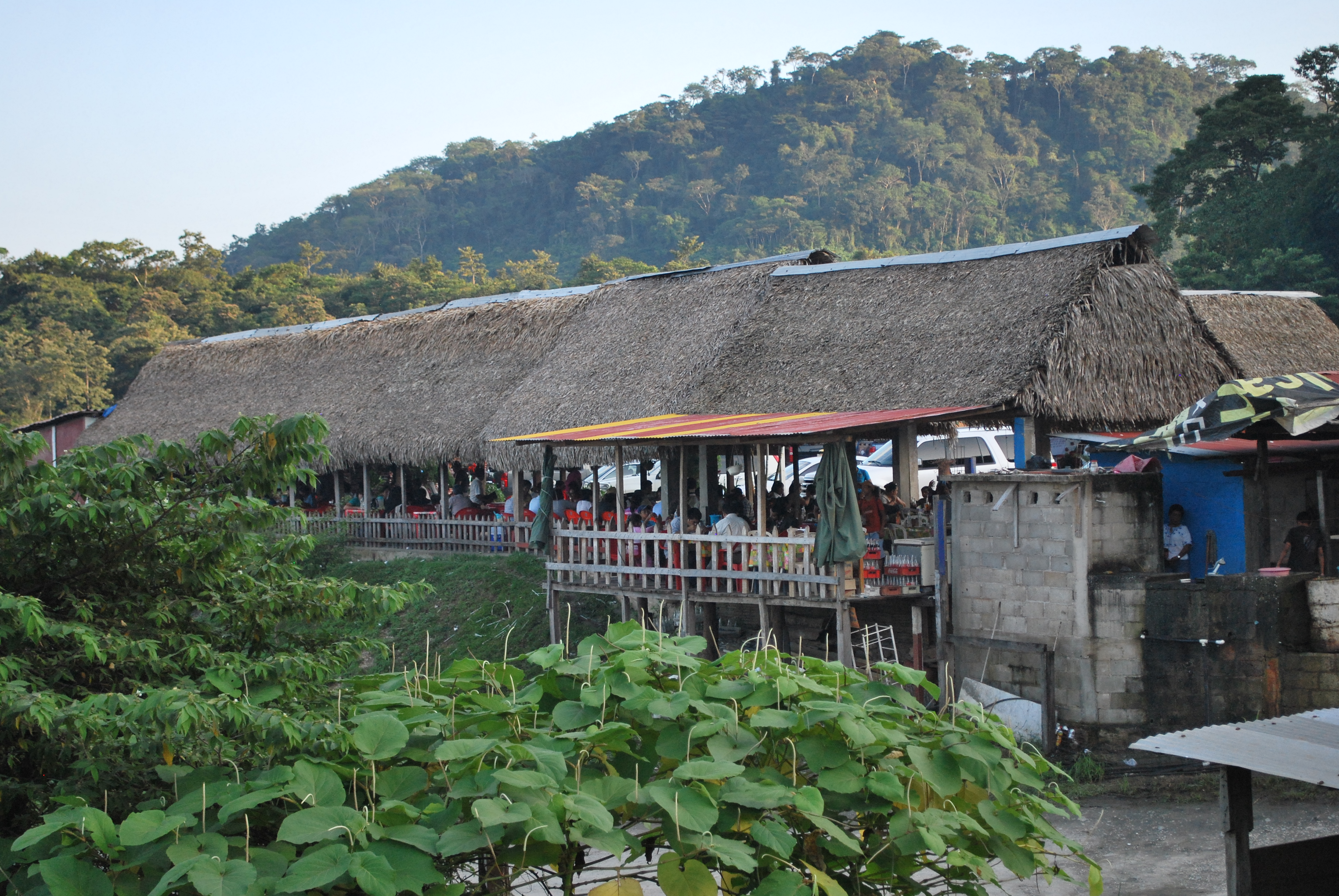
Restaurants next to the reservoir at the Chiapas bridge

The creation of the dam and later infrastructure projects has allowed for the development of an ecotourism industry in the area. Most of the reservoir is within the El Ocote Biosphere Reserve, an area of tall growth rainforest. This is one of the most important in southern Mexico due to the size and biological diversity. The federal government has invested in the development of ecotourism in the area such as Jun Jnopbentik, which is administered by eight local ejido organizations. Another attraction connected to the reservoir's river system is the La Venta Canyon, which is part of the La Venta River that feeds the reservoir and also part of the El Ocote Reserve. Next to the Chiapas Bridge, part of a major federal highway that was built in the area since the dam was constructed, there is an ecotourism center which offers boat tours, hiking, horseback riding and camping, along with a number of restaurants for passers-by featuring fish from the area.

== Chiapas Bridge ==
The Chiapas Bridge crosses over the Malpaso Dam reservoir and its part of a federal highway that connects southern Veracruz to Tuxtla Gutierrez. The bridge and highway make the dam area more accessible to tourism.

The decision to build the bridge was made in 2002 and the project lasted fourteen months with inauguration occurring in December 2003. The bridge stretches 1,208 meters over a section of the reservoir. The bridge is ten meters wide, with eight supports, seven pillars or "jackets" and one strip of concrete fastened onto solid land. The upper part of the bridge is made of orthotropic materials with 102 metal voussoirs which weigh 8,900 tons with an average weight of eight tons per meter. The total amount of steel used is over 19,000 tons, the equivalent of four ocean platforms. It was selected as the best infrastructure project in Mexico in 2004.
