= Selva El Ocote =

Biosphere reserve in Mexico

- IUCN category Ia (strict nature reserve)
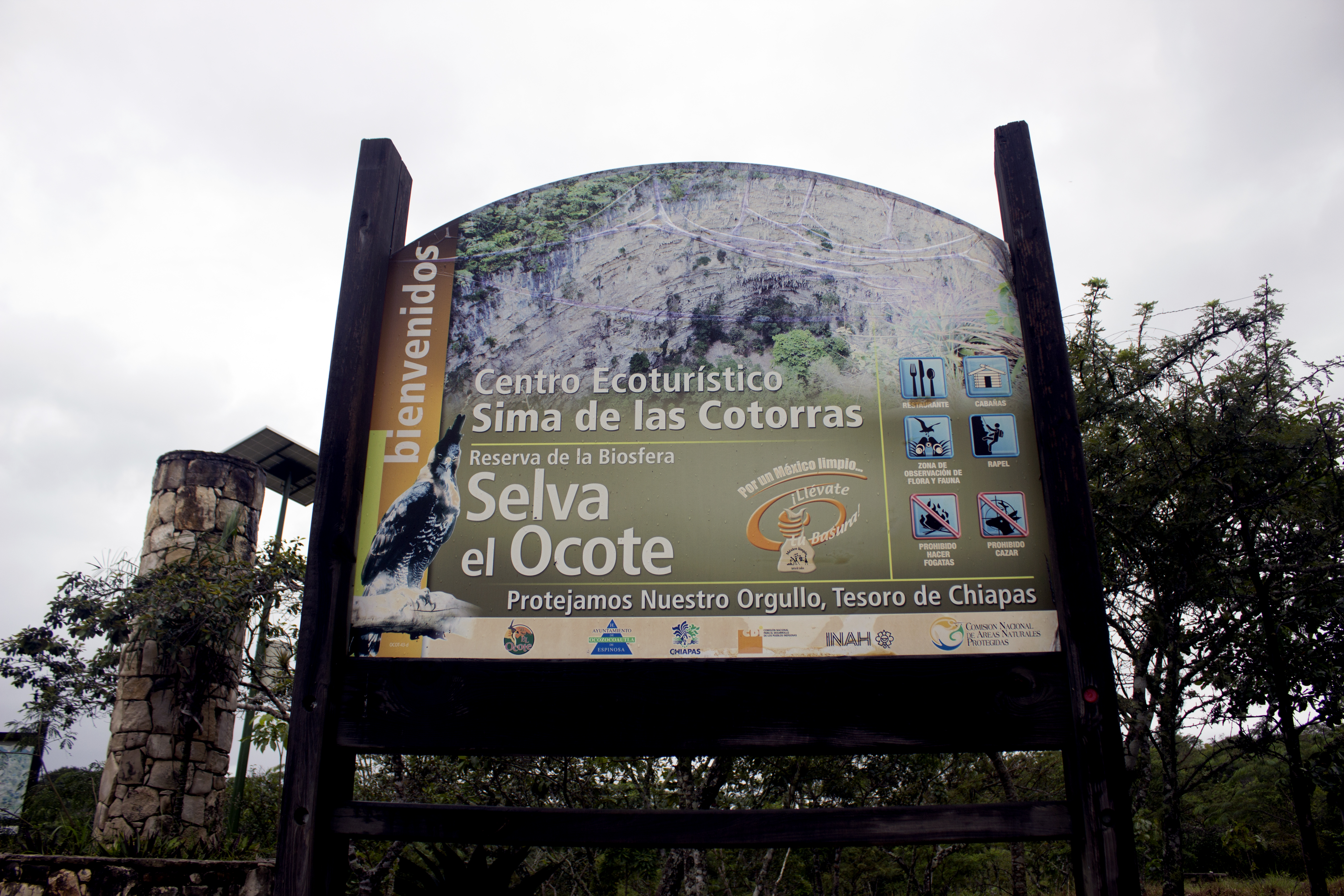
- Sign for the Selva el Ocote

- Location within Mexico
- Location: Chiapas, Mexico
- Coordinates: 17°00′06″N 93°41′57″W
- Area: 1,012.88 km^{2} (391.08 sq mi)
- Designation: biosphere reserve (national), UNESCO-MAB Biosphere Reserve (international)
- Designated: 2000 (national) 2006 (international)
- Governing body: National Commission of Natural Protected Areas

Selva El Ocote is a biosphere reserve in Mexico. It includes mid-elevation and highland rain forests and extensive caverns.

== Geography ==
It is located in the state of Chiapas, covering portions of the municipalities of Cintalapa, Ocozocoautla, Jiquipilas, and Tecpatán.

The reserve spans the La Venta River and the mountains south of Malpaso Reservoir. The mountains extend up to 1500 meters elevation. The geology includes large areas of limestone, including karstic caverns and aquifers.

== Flora and fauna ==
The reserve is in the Petén–Veracruz moist forests ecoregion. The dominant plant communities are tropical evergreen and semi-deciduous forests growing on limestone substrates.

The reserve is home to 334 species of birds. The reserve's large size makes it an important refuge for the region's birds, including the limited-range Nava's wren (Hylorchilus navai). Other native bird species include emerald-chinned hummingbird (Abeillia abeillei), sharp-shinned hawk (Accipiter striatus), roadside hawk (Buteo magnirostris), gray-lined hawk (Buteo nitidus), singing quail (Dactylortyx thoracicus), bat falcon (Falco rufigularis), Montezuma oropendola (Psarocolius montezuma), chestnut-headed oropendola (Psarocolius wagleri, and plain xenops (Xenops minutus).

== Conservation ==
The core area of the reserve was established in 2000 by the Mexican government. It covers an area of 306.49 km^{2}, and is managed as a strict nature reserve (IUCN protected area category Ia). In 2006 UNESCO designated Selva El Ocote as an international biosphere reserve, including both the core area and a larger buffer zone totaling 1012.88 km^{2}.

Economic activities in the reserve include agriculture and animal husbandry, organic coffee growing, animal husbandry, agriculture, and ecotourism.
