= Angostura Dam (Mexico) =

- Location within Mexico
- Official name: Presa Belisario Domínguez
- Country: Mexico
- Location: Venustiano Carranza, Chiapas
- Coordinates: 16°24′06″N 92°46′43″W
- Status: In use
- Construction began: 1969
- Opening date: 1976
- Owner: Comisión Federal de Electricidad

Dam and spillways
- Impounds: Grijalva River
- Height: 146 m (479 ft)

Reservoir
- Creates: Angostura Reservoir
- Total capacity: 18,200,000,000 m^{3} (14,754,980 acre⋅ft)
- Active capacity: 13,169,000,000 m^{3} (10,676,282 acre⋅ft)
- Surface area: 760 km^{2} (293 mi^{2})

Power Station
- Commission date: 1976-1978
- Turbines: 5 x 180 MW Francis turbines
- Installed capacity: 900 MW

The Angostura Dam (officially known as the Belisario Domínguez Dam) is an embankment dam and hydroelectric power station on the Grijalva River near Venustiano Carranza in Chiapas, Mexico. The dam's power plant contains 5 × 180 MW and 3 × 310 MW Francis turbine-generators. The 146-metre-tall (479-foot) dam withholds one of the largest reservoirs in Mexico, with a volume of 18,200,000,000 m^{3} (14,754,980 acre⋅ft). Initial construction on the dam began in 1969 and the foundation work in 1971. On 8 May 1974, the dam began to impound its reservoir. On 14 July 1976, the dam's first generator went online.
