= Grijalva River =

River in southeastern Mexico

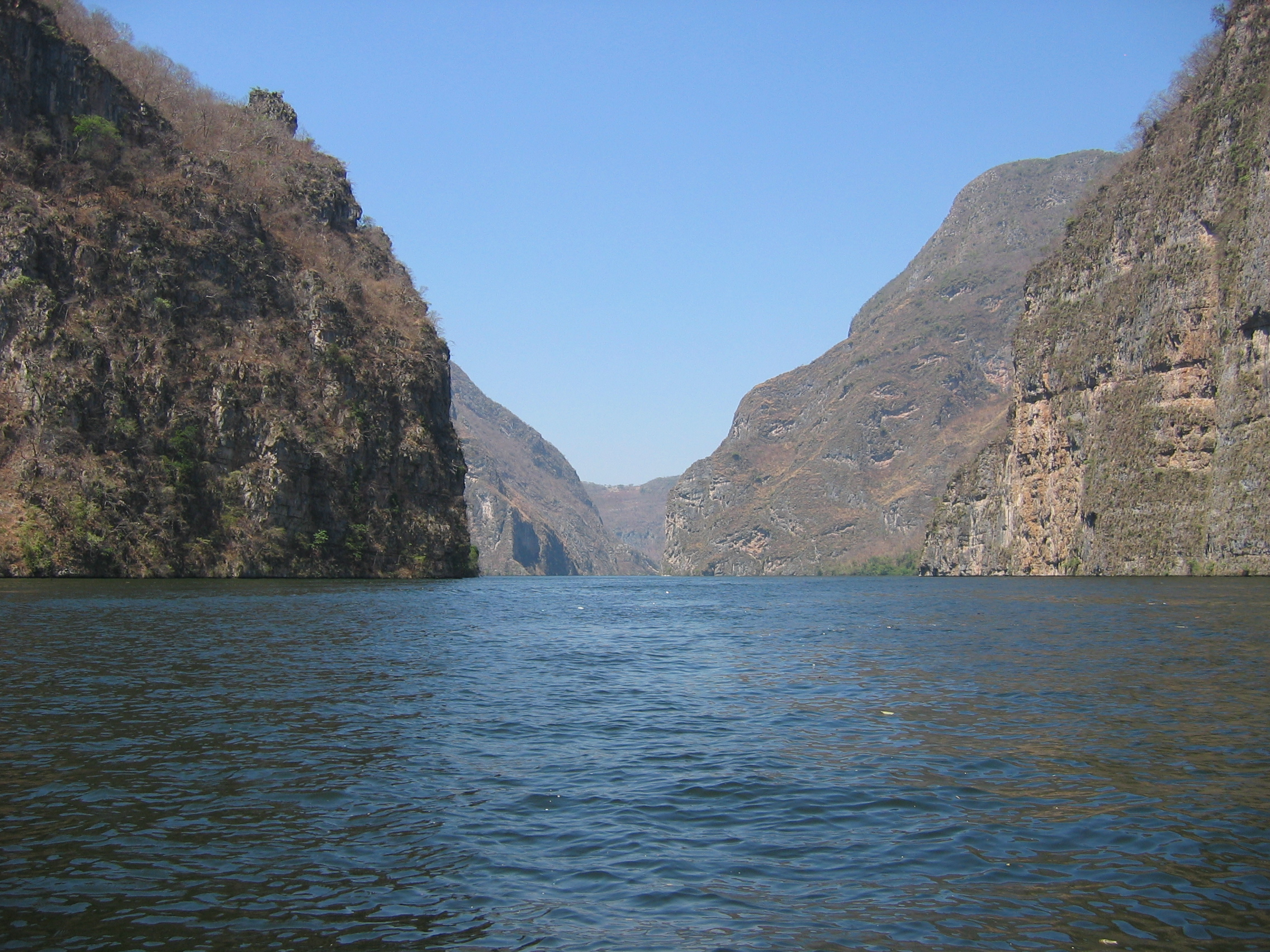
- The cliffs at Sumidero Canyon overlook the Grijalva River.
- Native name: Río Grijalva or Río Seleguá (Spanish)

Location
- Country: Guatemala; Mexico

Physical characteristics
- Mouth
  - location: Gulf of Mexico
  - coordinates: 18°36′10″N 92°41′33″W
  - elevation: 0 m (0 ft)
- Length: 480 km (300 mi)
- Basin size: 134,400 km^{2} (51,900 sq mi)
- Discharge
  - average: 3,079 m^{3}/s (108,700 cu ft/s)
  - minimum: 87 m^{3}/s (3,100 cu ft/s)
  - maximum: 6,286 m^{3}/s (222,000 cu ft/s)

Grijalva River, formerly known as Tabasco River (Spanish: Río Grijalva, known locally also as Río Grande de Chiapas, Río Grande and Mezcalapa River), is a 480 km (300 mi) long river in southeastern Mexico. It is named after Spanish conquistador Juan de Grijalva who visited the area in 1518. This river is born in the Sierra de los Cuchumatanes in the department of Huehuetenango in Guatemala, where it is known as Río Seleguá and is one of the most important rivers in that country.

The river rises from Río Grande de Chiapas in southeastern Chiapas and flows from Chiapas to the state of Tabasco through the Sumidero Canyon into the Bay of Campeche. Beginning as "Río Grande de Chiapas" or "Río Mezcalapa", later, Río Grande is stopped at the Angostura Dam (Mexico), one of the largest reservoirs in Mexico, and then its course is now named "Grijalva River". The river's drainage basin is 134,400 km^{2} (51,900 mi^{2}) in size. Because of the close connection to the Usumacinta River (the two combine, flowing into the Gulf of Mexico in a single delta), they are often regarded as a single river basin, the Grijalva-Usumacinta River. Río Grande de Chiapas rises into Sierra de los Cuchumatanes, Huehuetenango; in Guatemala receives the name "Selegua River" and also is a large river.

After flowing from Nezahualcoyotl Lake, an artificial lake created by the hydroelectric Malpaso Dam, Grijalva River turns northward and eastward, roughly paralleling the Chiapas–Tabasco state border. It flows through Villahermosa (where, in 2001, a new cable-stayed bridge was constructed to cross the river) and empties into the Gulf of Mexico, approximately 10 km (6.2 mi) northwest of Frontera. The river is navigable by shallow-draft boats for approximately 100 mi (160 km) upstream.

== Gallery ==
Juan de Grijalva, expedition in 1518. Discovery by the Europeans of the Grijalva River.

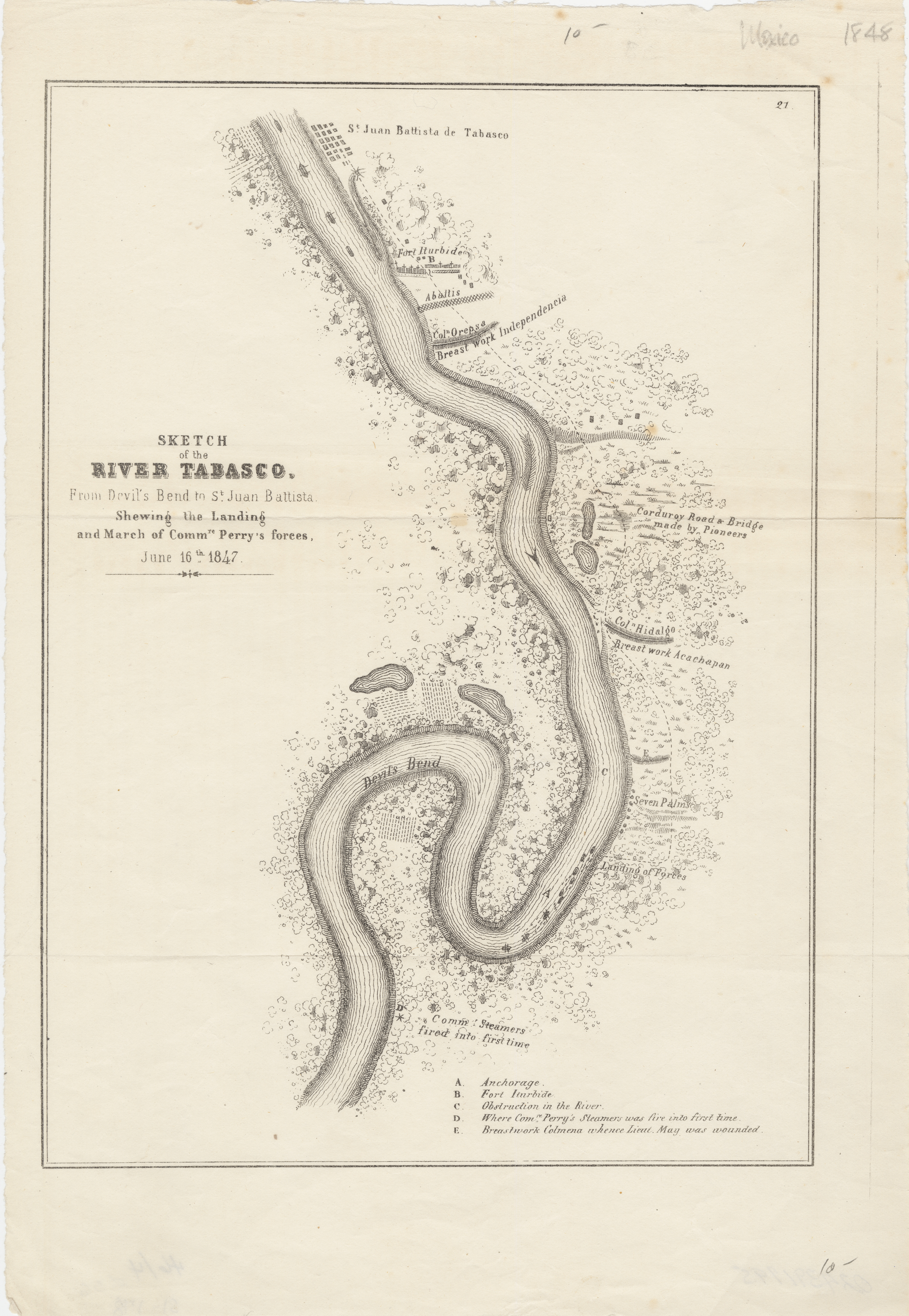
Sketch of the River Tabasco, 1847–48

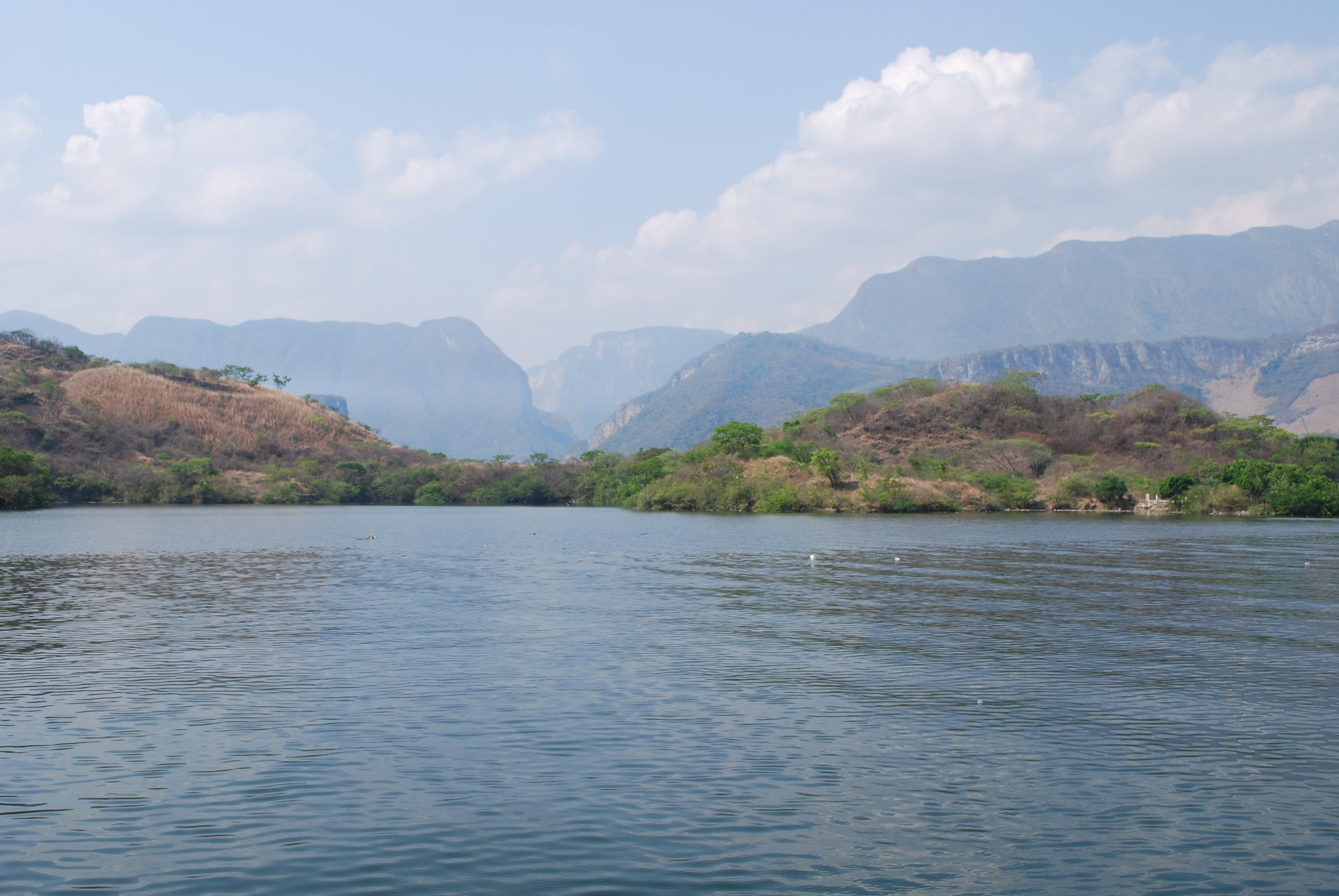

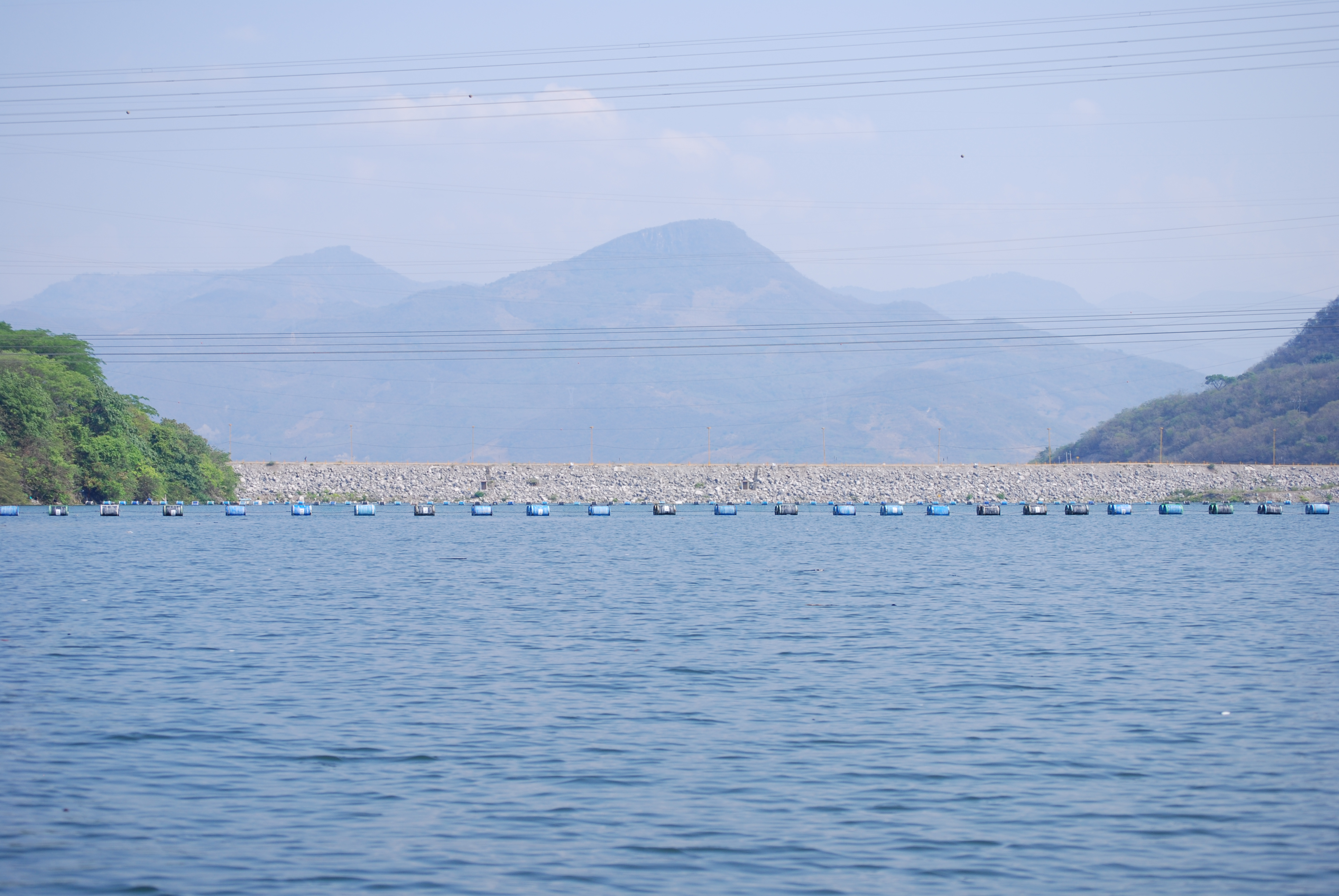
Chicoasén Dam

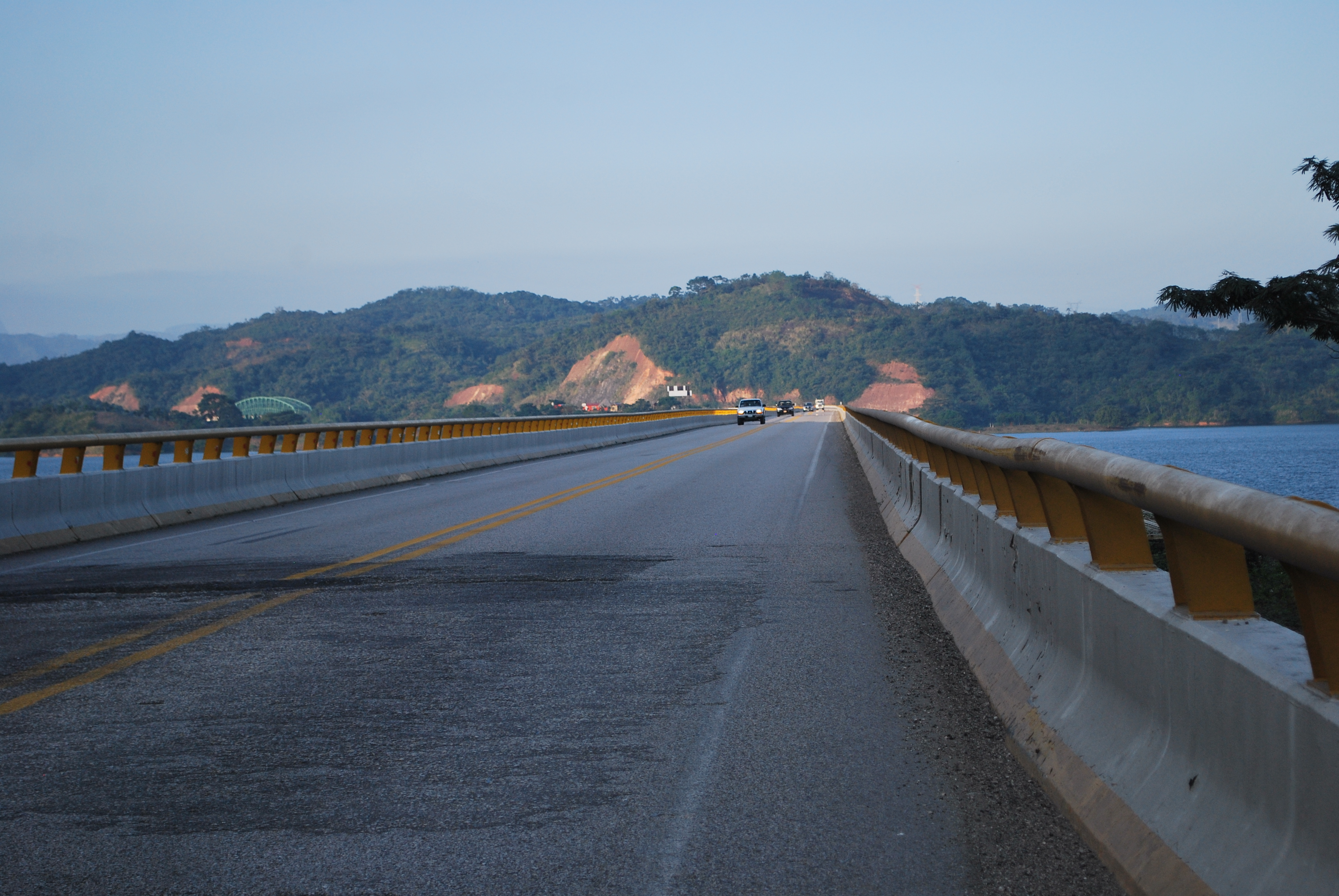
Malpaso Dam

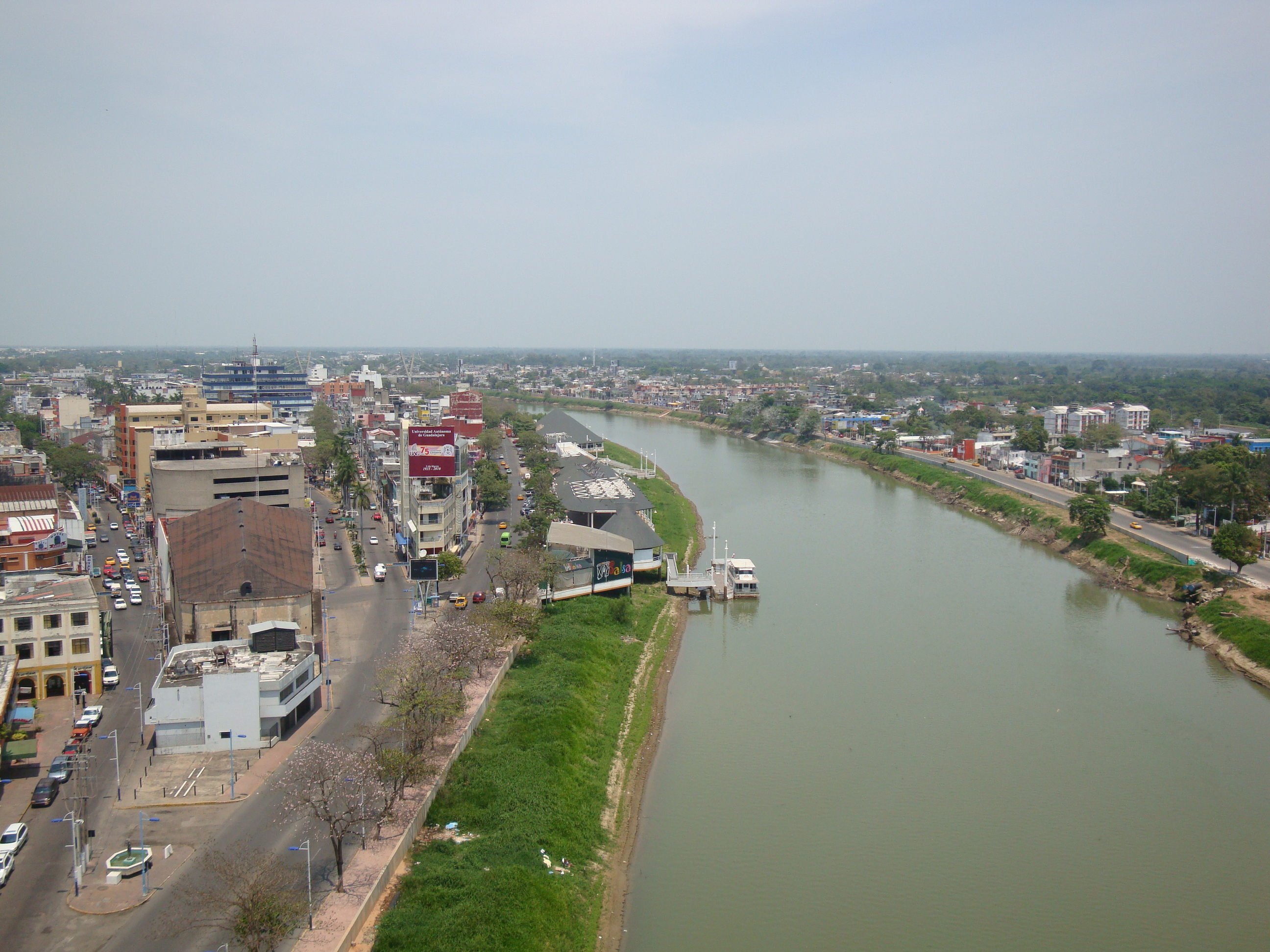
Grijalva River flowing through Villahermosa

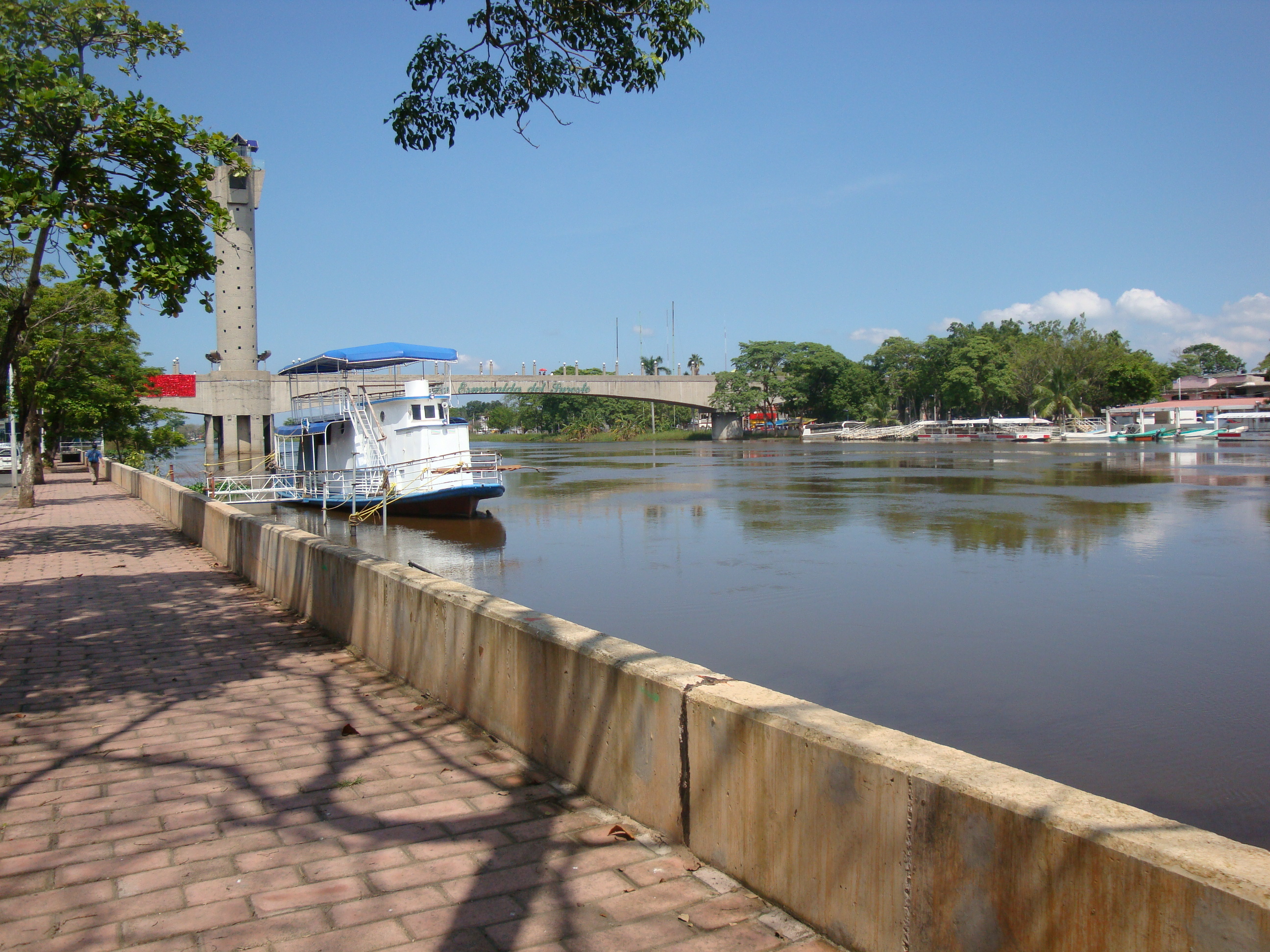

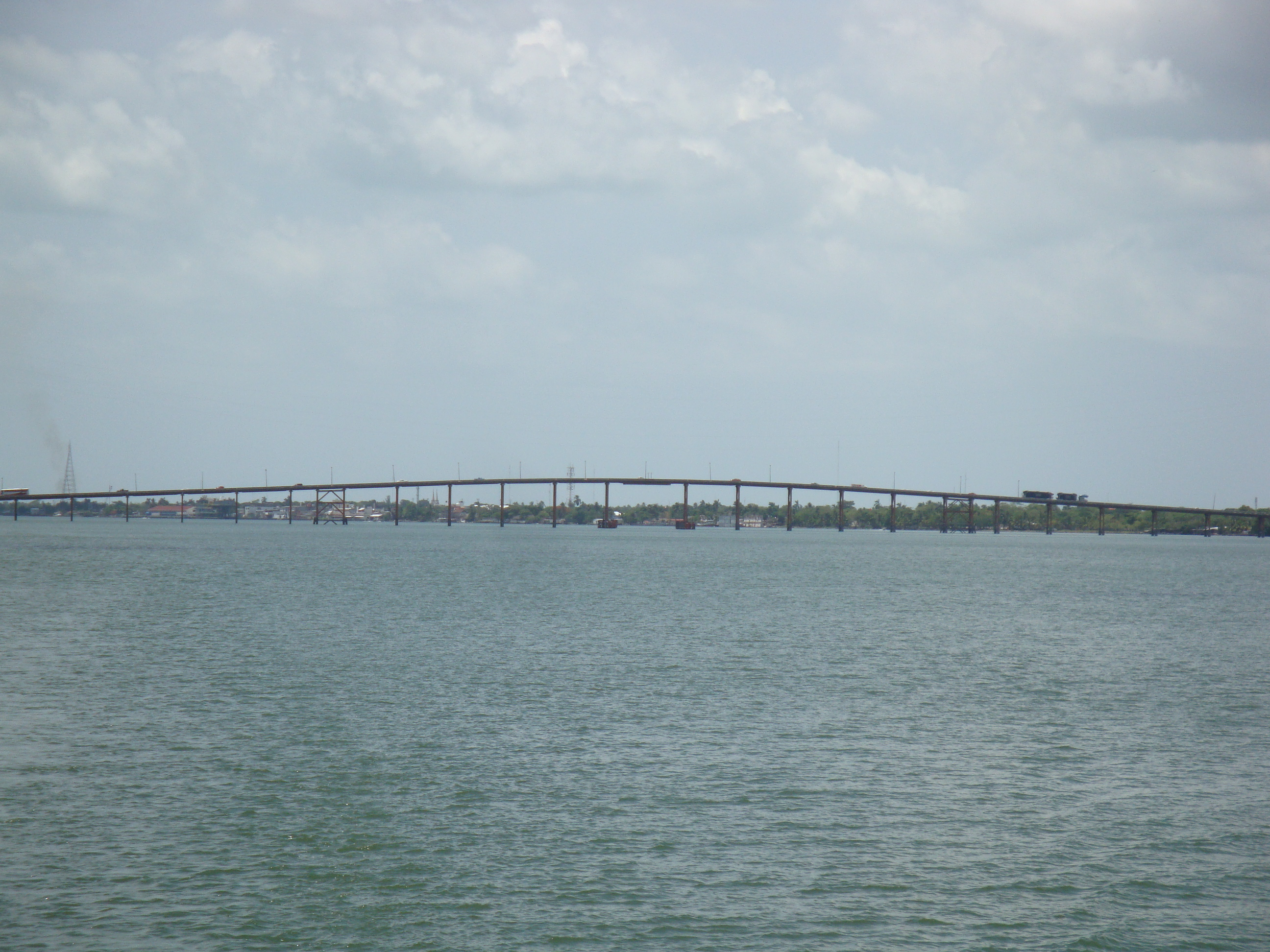
Mouth

== See also ==
- Chiapas bridge
- List of longest rivers of Mexico
