= Do Meio River =

There are several rivers named Do Meio River or Rio do Meio in Brazil:

- Do Meio River (Bahia, Atlantic Ocean tributary)
- Do Meio River (Bahia, Corrente River tributary)
- Do Meio River (Bahia, Jequié River tributary)
- Do Meio River (Bahia, Peruípe River tributary)
- Do Meio River (Braço do Norte River tributary)
- Do Meio River (Itajaí River tributary)
- Do Meio River (Paraíba)
- Do Meio River (Paraná)
- Do Meio River (Rio de Janeiro)
- Do Meio River (Rio Grande do Sul)

== See also ==
- Paraíba do Meio River, Alagoas, Brazil
