= Frades River (Bahia) =

River in Bahia, Brazil

- Location within Brazil
- Native name: Rio dos Frades (Portuguese)

Location
- Country: Brazil

Physical characteristics
- Mouth
  - location: Atlantic Ocean
  - coordinates: 16.689403°S 39.104817°W

The Frades River (Portuguese: Rio dos Frades - Friar's River) is a river in the state of Bahia, Brazil.

== Basin ==
The river has a 436 square kilometres (168 sq mi) drainage basin. Its headwaters rise in the eastern foothills of the Vista Alegre and Pinhão serras at altitudes of 400 to 500 metres (1,300 to 1,600 ft). The basin and surrounding watershed cover 2,251 square kilometres (869 sq mi) between the Caraíva River basin to the south, Jucuruçu River basin to the southeast and Buranhém River basin to the north. The Atlantic Ocean is to the east.

== Course ==
The river has a length of 115 kilometres (71 mi). Its source is the Córrego do Frade in the municipality of Guaratinga, Bahia. The córrego runs southeast to meet the Barriguda River, forming the Frades River, which runs east and then southeast to the Atlantic Ocean. The Pau Brasil National Park lies between the Frades and Buranhém rivers. The mouth of the river is protected by the 894 hectares (2,210 acres) Rio dos Frades Wildlife Refuge, and is an area of restinga salt marsh, with shrubs and thickets. There are mangroves and many bromeliads and orchids.

== See also ==
- List of rivers of Bahia

== Sources ==
- Castro, Márcia Salustiano de; Bonecker, Ana Cristina T. (May 2013), Elaboração de estudo de socioeconomia e áreas correlatas para atender as necessidades no Refúgio de Vida Silvestre do Rio dos Frades: Produto 2 (PDF), Rio de Janeiro/RJ, archived from the original (PDF) on 2016-10-23
- Unidade de Conservação: Parque Nacional Pau Brasil (in Portuguese), MMA: Ministério do Meio Ambiente
- Unidade de Conservação: Refúgio de Vida Silvestre do Rio dos Frades (in Portuguese), MMA: Ministério do Meio Ambiente
