= Pedra d'Água River =

Location
- Country: Brazil

Physical characteristics
- Source
  - location: Bahia state
- Mouth: Peixe River
  - coordinates: 11°10′S 39°50′W

The Pedra d'Água River is a river in Bahia state in eastern Brazil. It is a tributary of the Peixe River in the municipality of Queimadas.

== See also ==
- List of rivers of Bahia
