= Una River =

Una River may refer to:

- Una (Sava), a river in Bosnia and Croatia, tributary to Sava
- Una River (Pernambuco), in northeastern Brazil
- Una River (Paraíba), in northeastern Brazil
- In Bahia, eastern Brazil:
  - Una River (Itaete, Bahia), a tributary of the Paraguaçu River
  - Una River (Una, Bahia), a river that flows past the municipality of Una and empties into the Atlantic Ocean
  - Una River (Valença, Bahia), a river that flows past the municipality of Valença and empties into the Atlantic Ocean
- Una River (Rio de Janeiro), in southeastern Brazil
- D'Una River, Santa Caterina, Brazil
- Una da Aldeia River, São Paulo, Brazil

== See also ==
- Una (disambiguation)
