= Rio Verde Pequeno =

Location
- Country: Brazil

Physical characteristics
- Source
  - location: Bahia state
- Mouth: Verde Grande River
  - coordinates: 14°49′S 43°31′W

Rio Verde Pequeno (Portuguese for "little green river") It is a tributary of the Rio Verde, it demarcates the border between the States of Minas Gerais and Bahia in eastern Brazil.

== See also ==
- List of rivers of Bahia
