= Peruípe River (Braço Sul) =

Location
- Country: Brazil

Physical characteristics
- Source
  - location: Bahia state
- Mouth: Peruípe River
  - location: Ibirapuã
  - coordinates: 17°45′S 39°42′W

The Peruípe River (Braço Sul) is a river in Bahia state in eastern Brazil. It is one of two branches which form parts of the boundaries of Ibirapuã municipality before merging to form the Peruípe River.

== See also ==
- List of rivers of Bahia
