= Riachão River (Bahia) =

Location
- Country: Brazil

Physical characteristics
- Source
  - location: Bahia state
- Mouth: Preto River
  - coordinates: 11°4′S 45°25′W

The Riachão River is a river of Bahia state in eastern Brazil.

== See also ==
- List of rivers of Bahia
