= Pimenteira =

See

- Pimenteira language
- Vereda Pimenteira river
- Pimenteiras
