= Piau (disambiguation) =

Piau is a municipality in Minas Gerais, Brazil.

Piau may also refer to:

- Piau River, a river in Bahia, Brazil
- Piau (footballer), Eronildes de Souza (born 1948), Brazilian football winger
- Sandrine Piau (born 1965), French soprano

== See also ==
- Piau-Engaly, a winter sports resort in the French Pyrenees
- Piaus River, a river in Tocantins, Brazil
