= Léo Bahia (footballer, born 1986) =

Brazilian footballer

Personal information
- Full name: Leonardo Matos de Oliveira
- Date of birth: 7 January 1986 (age 40)
- Place of birth: Ibirapuã, Brazil
- Height: 1.88 m (6 ft 2 in)
- Position: Centre-back

Youth career
- 2003–2005: Cruzeiro
- 2006: São Caetano

Senior career*
Years	Team	Apps	(Gls)
2006–2007	São Caetano		
2006	→ Vitória (loan)		
2008	Marília		
2008–2009	Aljustrelense	14	(0)
2009–2010	Sertanense	20	(1)
2010–2011	Praiense	7	(0)
2011–2012	Al Rustaq		
2012	Gandzasar	1	(0)
2013	Juventus Jaraguá		
2013	São José	4	(0)
2013	Santa Cruz	2	(0)
2014	Linense	0	(0)
2014	CSA	5	(0)
2015	Audax	7	(0)
2015	Al-Markhiya SC		
2016	Al-Riffa		
2016–2017	Salam Zgharta	18	(4)
2017	Al-Qaisomah		
2017	Al-Sahel		
- * Club domestic league appearances and goals as of 30 March 2015

Leonardo Matos de Oliveira (born January 7, 1986, in Ibirapuã), commonly known as Léo Bahia, is a Brazilian footballer who plays as a central defender.
