= Santana River =

Santana River or Sant'Ana River may refer to:

- Santana River (Bahia), a tributary of the Cachoeira River
- Santana River (Espírito Santo), a tributary of the São Mateus River
- Santana River (Maranhão), a tributary of the Grajaú River
- Santana River (Mato Grosso do Sul), a tributary of the Paranaíba River
- Santana River (Minas Gerais), a tributary of the Rio Grande
- Santana River (Paraná), a tributary of the Chopim River
- Sant'Ana River (Piedade River tributary), in Paraná
- Sant'Ana River (Da Areia River tributary), in Paraná
- Santana River (Rio de Janeiro), a tributary of the Guandu River
- Santana River (East Timor), a river of East Timor
