= Carnaíba de Fora River =

Location
- Country: Brazil

Physical characteristics
- Source
  - location: Bahia state
- Mouth: Das Rãs River
  - coordinates: 13°59′S 43°22′W

The Carnaíba de Fora River is a river of Bahia state in eastern Brazil.

== See also ==
- List of rivers of Bahia
