= Preto River (Bahia, Jequié River tributary) =

Location
- Country: Brazil

Physical characteristics
- Source
  - location: Bahia state
- Mouth: Jequié River
  - coordinates: 13°39′S 39°23′W

The Preto River is a river of Bahia state in eastern Brazil. It is a tributary of the Jequié or Das Almas River.

== See also ==
- List of rivers of Bahia
