= Sapão River =

Coordinates: 11°01′16″S 45°31′39″W

Location
- Country: Brazil

Physical characteristics
- Source
  - location: Bahia state

The Sapão River is a river of Bahia state in eastern Brazil.

The Sapão is a tributary of the Preto River of Bahia.

The river basin includes part of the 707,079 hectares (1,747,230 acres) Serra Geral do Tocantins Ecological Station, a strictly protected conservation unit created in 2001 to preserve an area of cerrado.

== See also ==
- List of rivers of Bahia
