= Utinga River =

- Mouth location in Brazil
- Native name: Rio Utinga (Portuguese)

Location
- Country: Brazil

Physical characteristics
- Source
  - location: Bahia state
- Mouth
  - coordinates: 12°33′29″S 41°19′59″W

The Utinga River is a river of Bahia state in eastern Brazil. It is a tributary of the Santo Antônio River, which in turn feeds the Paraguaçu River.

The river basin includes part of the 46,000 hectares (110,000 acres) Morro do Chapéu State Park, created in 1998.

== See also ==
- List of rivers of Bahia
