= Das Pedras River (Bahia) =

Location
- Country: Brazil

Physical characteristics
- Source
  - location: Bahia state
- Mouth: Das Ondas River
  - coordinates: 12°14′S 45°17′W

The Das Pedras River is a river of Bahia state in eastern Brazil.

== See also ==
- List of rivers of Bahia
