= Correntina =

Municipality in Bahia, Brazil

- Municipality of Bahia, Brazil
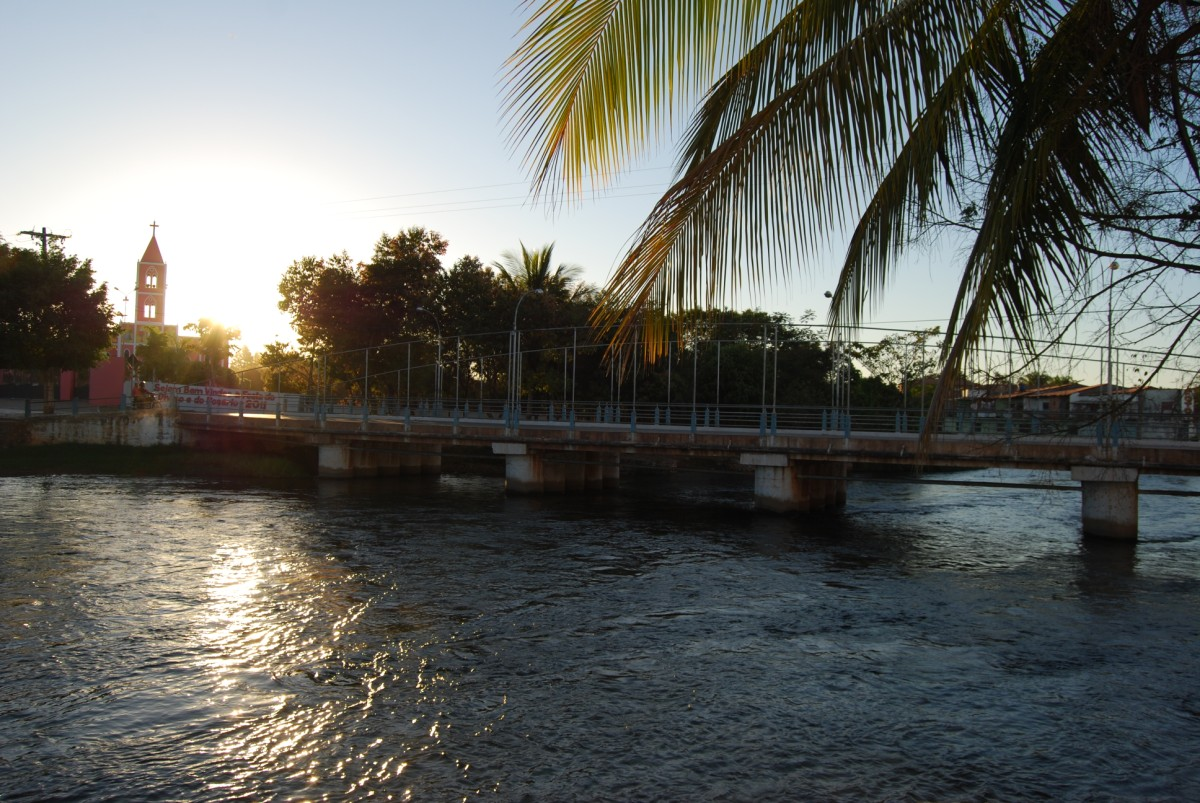
- Bridge crossing the Das Éguas River with Church of Our Lady of Gloria in the background

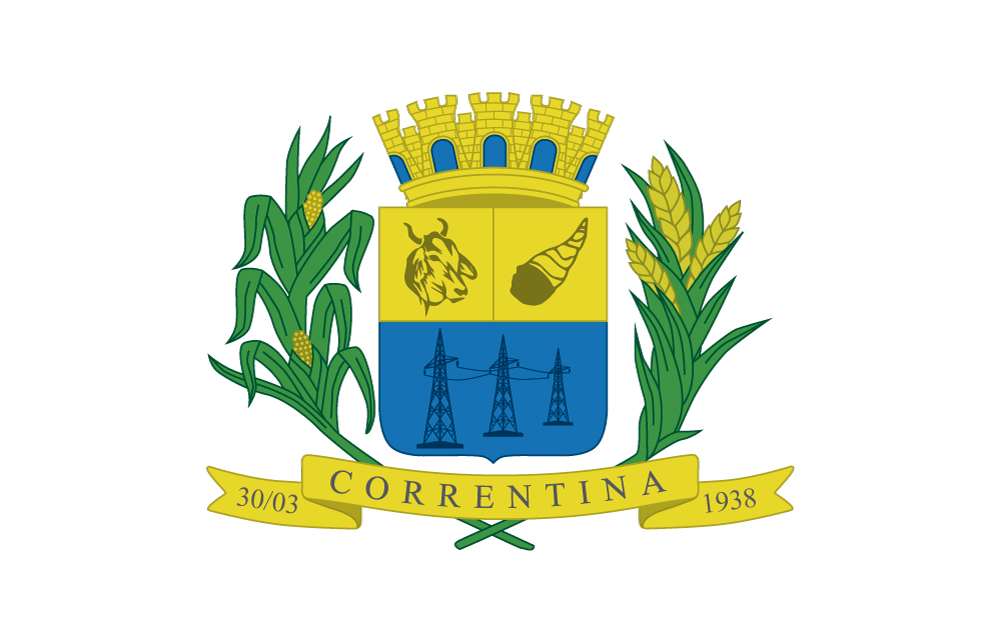
- Flag

- Location of Correntina in Bahia

- Location within Brazil Location within South America
- Coordinates: 13°20′35″S 44°38′10″W
- Country: Brazil
- Region: Northeast
- State: Bahia
- Founded: 15 May 1866

Government
  - Mayor: Walter Mariano Messias de Souza (UNIÃO) (2025–2028)
  - Vice Mayor: Cassimiro Castro e Silva (PRD) (2025–2028)

Area
  - Total: 11,504.314 km^{2} (4,441.840 sq mi)
- Elevation: 575 m (1,886 ft)

Population (2022)
  - Total: 32,457
  - Density: 2.82/km^{2} (7.3/sq mi)
- Demonym: Correntinense (Brazilian Portuguese)
- Time zone: UTC-03:00 (Brasília Time)
- Postal code: 47650-000, 47654-000
- HDI (2010): 0.603 – medium
- Website: correntina.ba.gov.br

Correntina is a municipality in the state of Bahia in Brazil, 500 km from Brasília and 980 km from Salvador. In 2020, the population was estimated at 32,191.

== History ==
Correntina was first mentioned in the dispatches of the Entradistas and Bandereirantes who visited the city in 1700 and 1790.

The Decree Federal Law of nº 311 signed by Getúlio Vargas on March 2, 1938, authorizing that the States made the territorial divisions, it was that, for the State Decree of nº 10.724, signed for the Federal interventor Landulpho Alves, in 30 of March 1938, the Village received the forum from City, under the baton of the Intendant Major Félix Joaquin de Araújo, however, they had only come to commemorate in 01 of January 1939, considering the delay in the art of if communicating.

== Geography ==
The "Correntina", "Arojado", "Saint Antonio", "Guará" and "Rio do meio" rivers run near or through Correntina, and the Island of the Ranchão lies in the Correntina river. 1,200 meters away from the central city, the "Sete Ilhas" ("Seven Islands") form an archipelago, typical of the city's natural environment.

=== Climate ===
Climate data for Correntina (1981–2010)
Month	Jan	Feb	Mar	Apr	May	Jun	Jul	Aug	Sep	Oct	Nov	Dec	Year
Mean daily maximum °C (°F)	31.0 (87.8)	31.4 (88.5)	30.9 (87.6)	31.1 (88.0)	31.3 (88.3)	30.4 (86.7)	30.6 (87.1)	31.8 (89.2)	33.6 (92.5)	34.1 (93.4)	31.8 (89.2)	30.8 (87.4)	31.6 (88.9)
Daily mean °C (°F)	24.7 (76.5)	25.0 (77.0)	24.6 (76.3)	24.5 (76.1)	23.6 (74.5)	21.9 (71.4)	22.0 (71.6)	23.2 (73.8)	25.7 (78.3)	26.7 (80.1)	25.5 (77.9)	24.8 (76.6)	24.4 (75.9)
Mean daily minimum °C (°F)	19.9 (67.8)	20.0 (68.0)	20.0 (68.0)	19.3 (66.7)	17.2 (63.0)	14.5 (58.1)	14.2 (57.6)	14.9 (58.8)	18.2 (64.8)	20.3 (68.5)	20.6 (69.1)	20.1 (68.2)	18.3 (64.9)
Average precipitation mm (inches)	130 (5.1)	104.4 (4.11)	145.5 (5.73)	62.0 (2.44)	9.0 (0.35)	0.5 (0.02)	0.3 (0.01)	2.3 (0.09)	10.2 (0.40)	74.2 (2.92)	164.7 (6.48)	220.8 (8.69)	923.9 (36.37)
Average precipitation days (≥ 1.0 mm)	9	8	11	5	1	0	0	0	2	6	12	13	67
Average relative humidity (%)	77.9	76.0	77.2	73.8	68.4	64.0	59.9	54.7	50.1	57.8	72.0	77.2	67.4
Mean monthly sunshine hours	224.4	204.0	222.4	240.5	264.8	271.5	284.0	299.2	276.4	241.8	180.6	190.3	2,899.9
Source: Instituto Nacional de Meteorologia

== Gallery ==
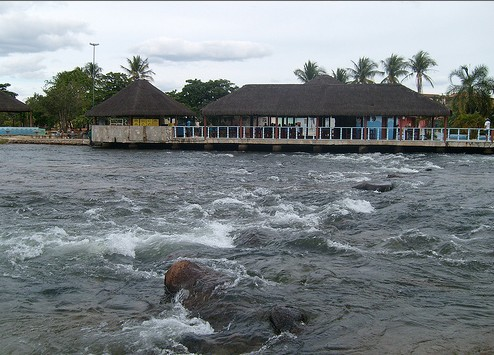
Looking towards Ranchão Island

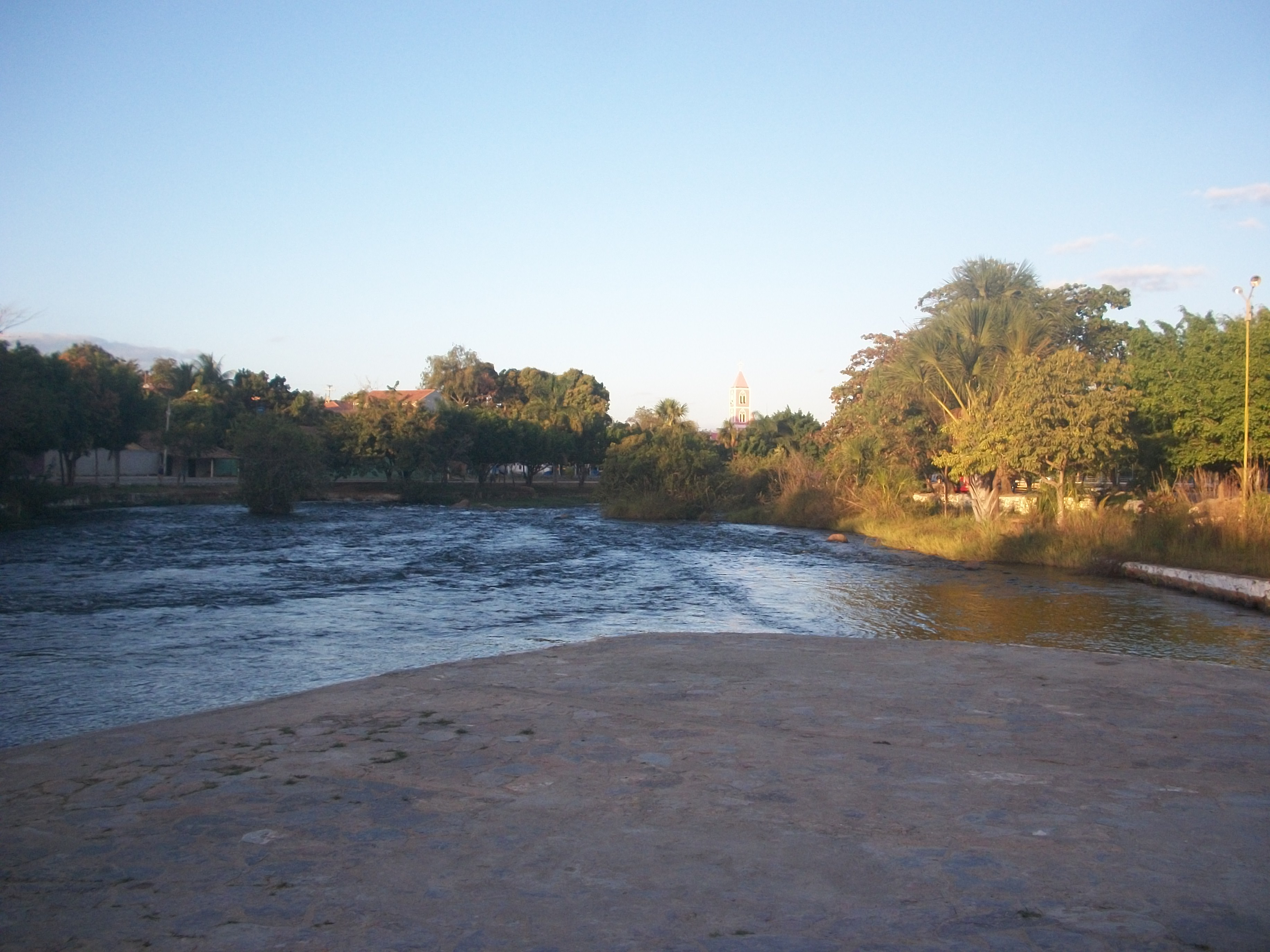
On Ranchão Island looking towards Church of Our Lady of Gloria

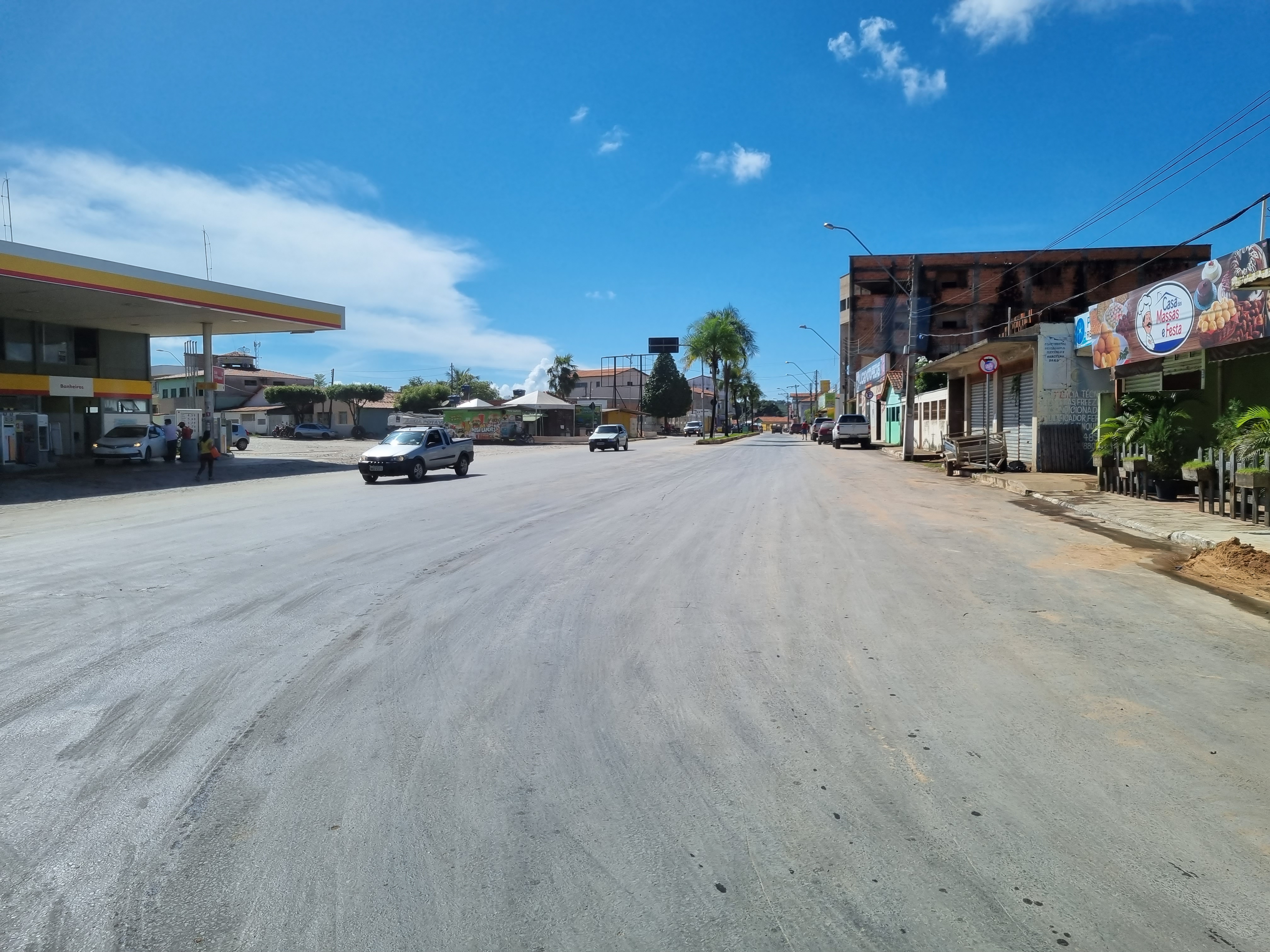
Avenue Tancredo Neves

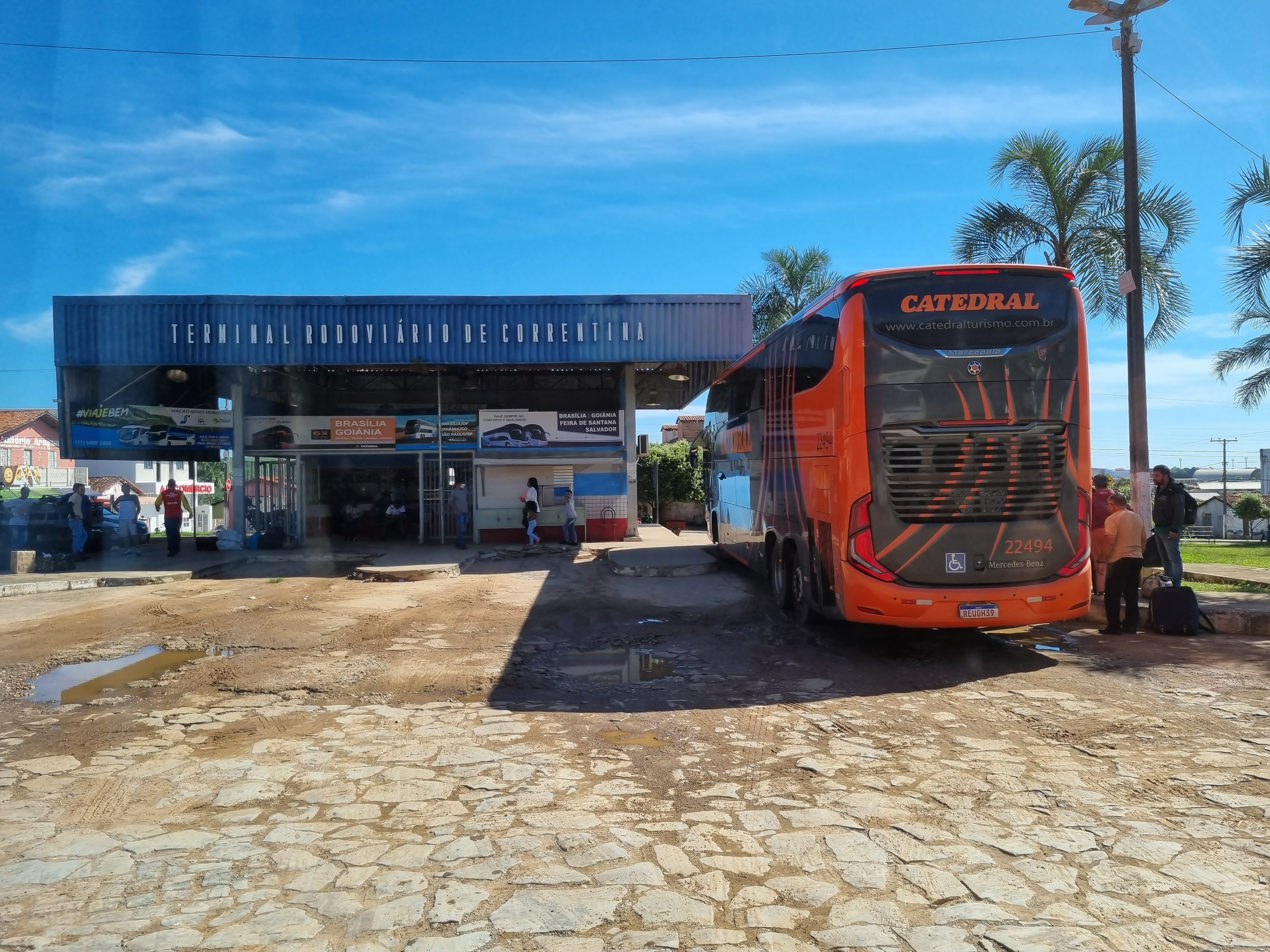
Terminal bus station

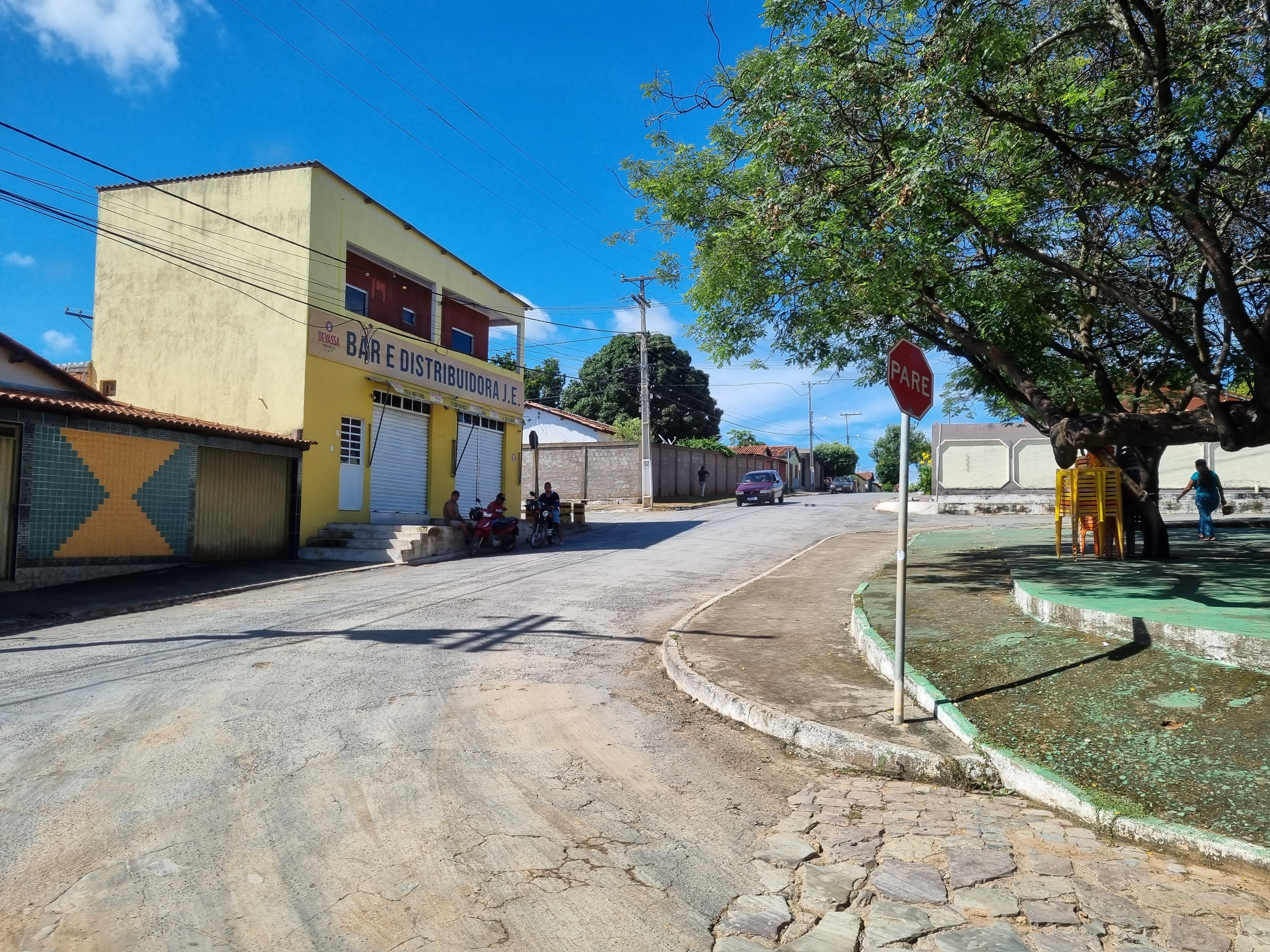
Boa Vista Road

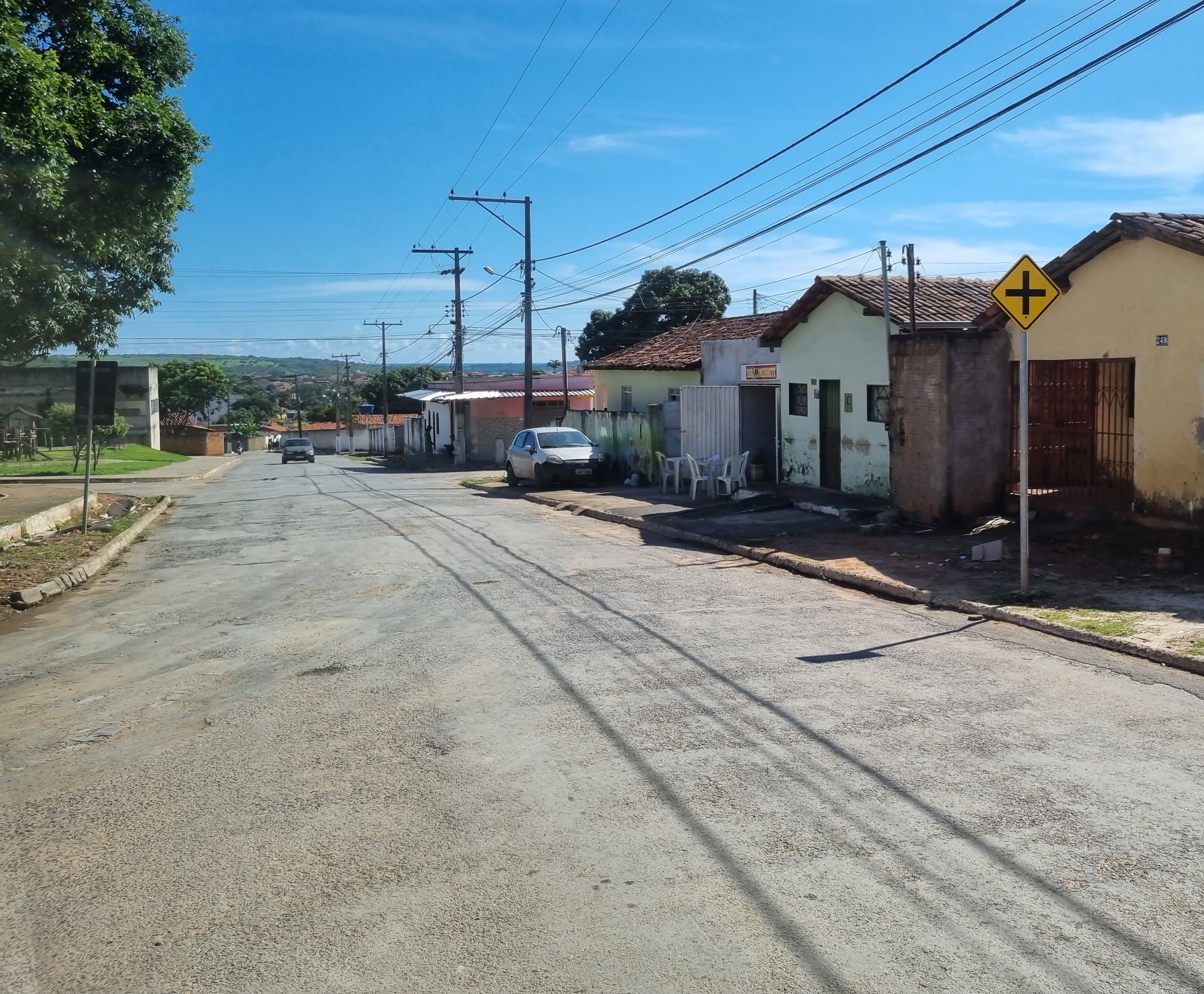
Boa Vista Road

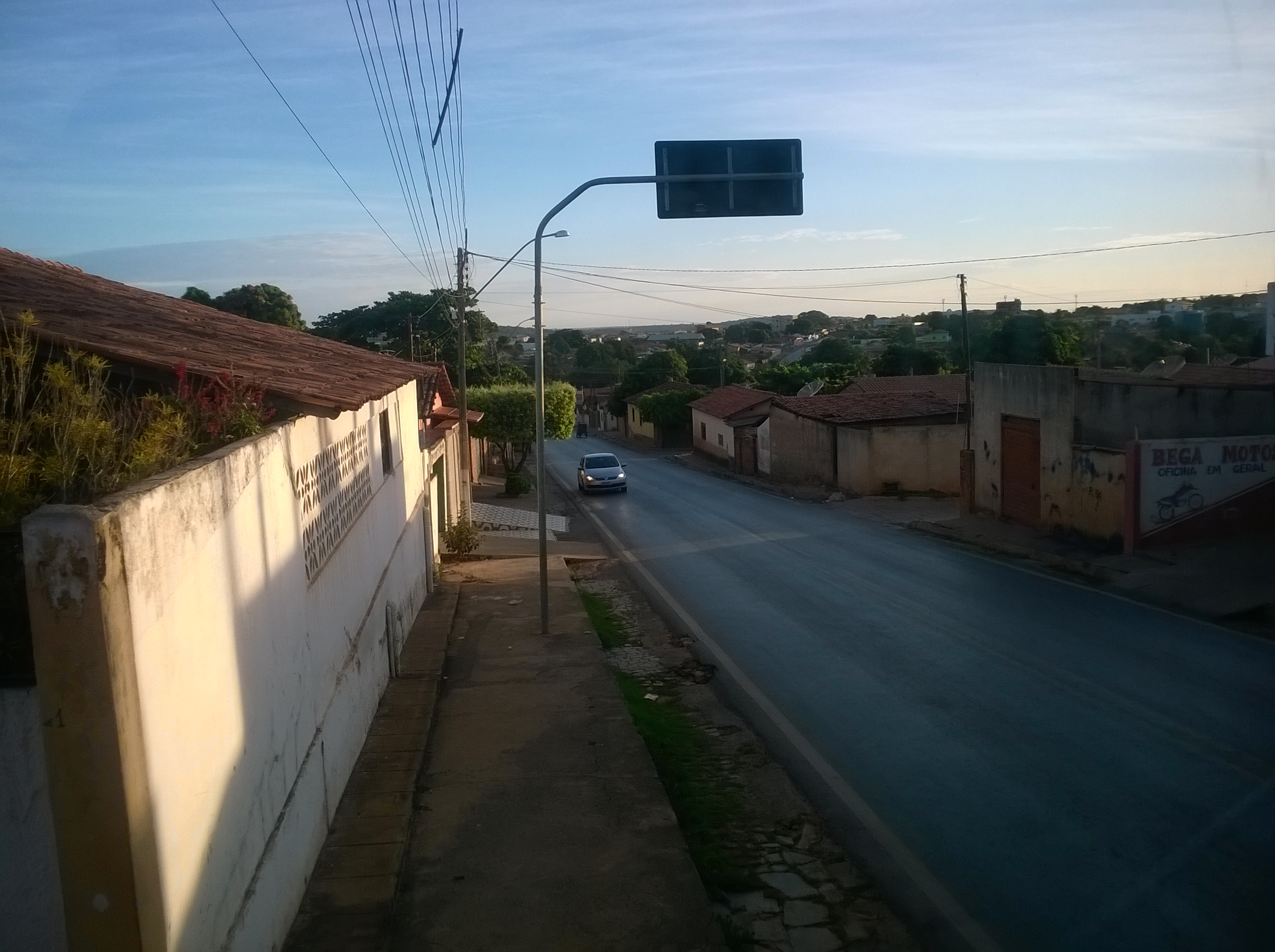
Aleixo Caetano Road

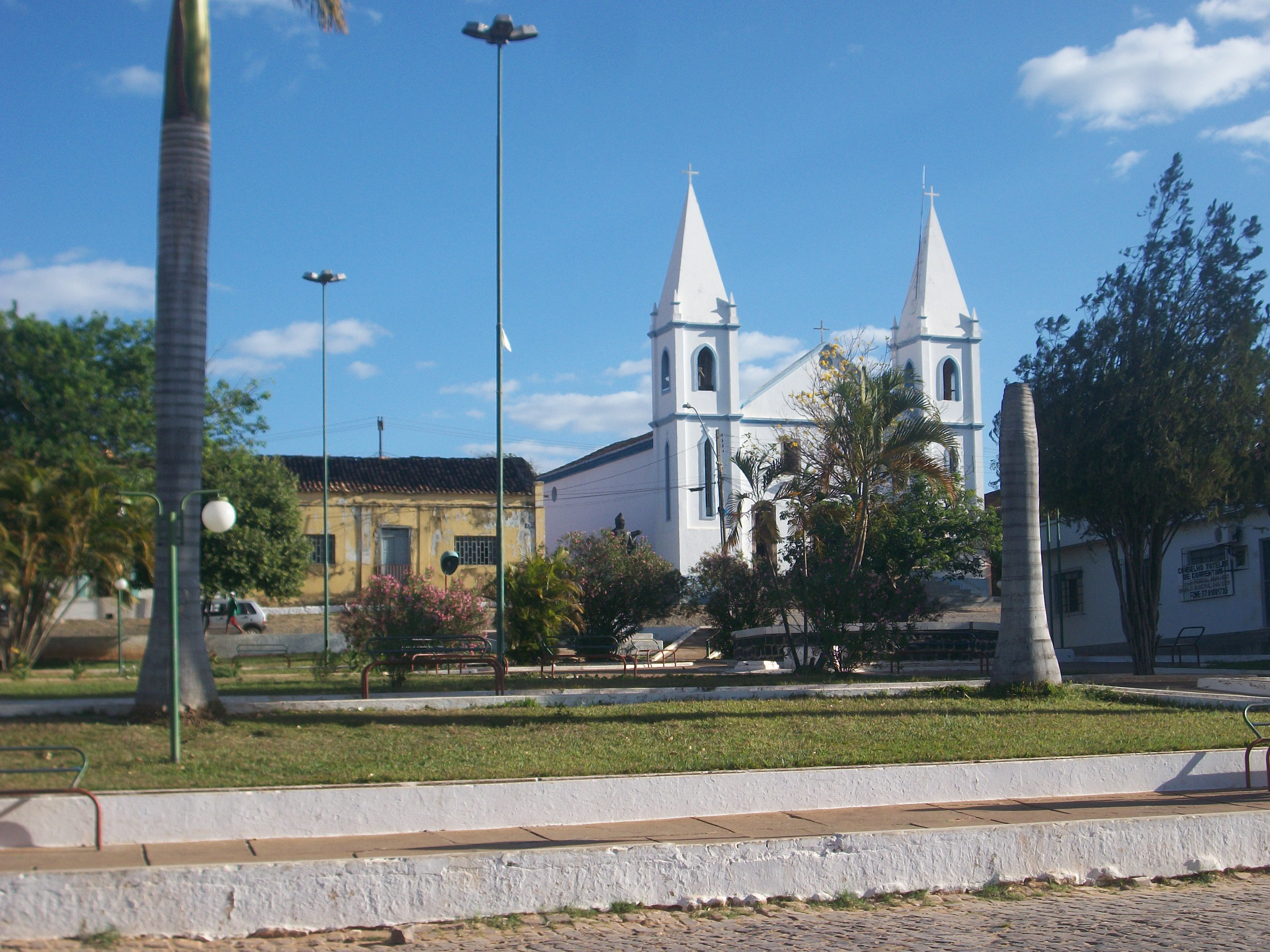
Immaculate Conception Church

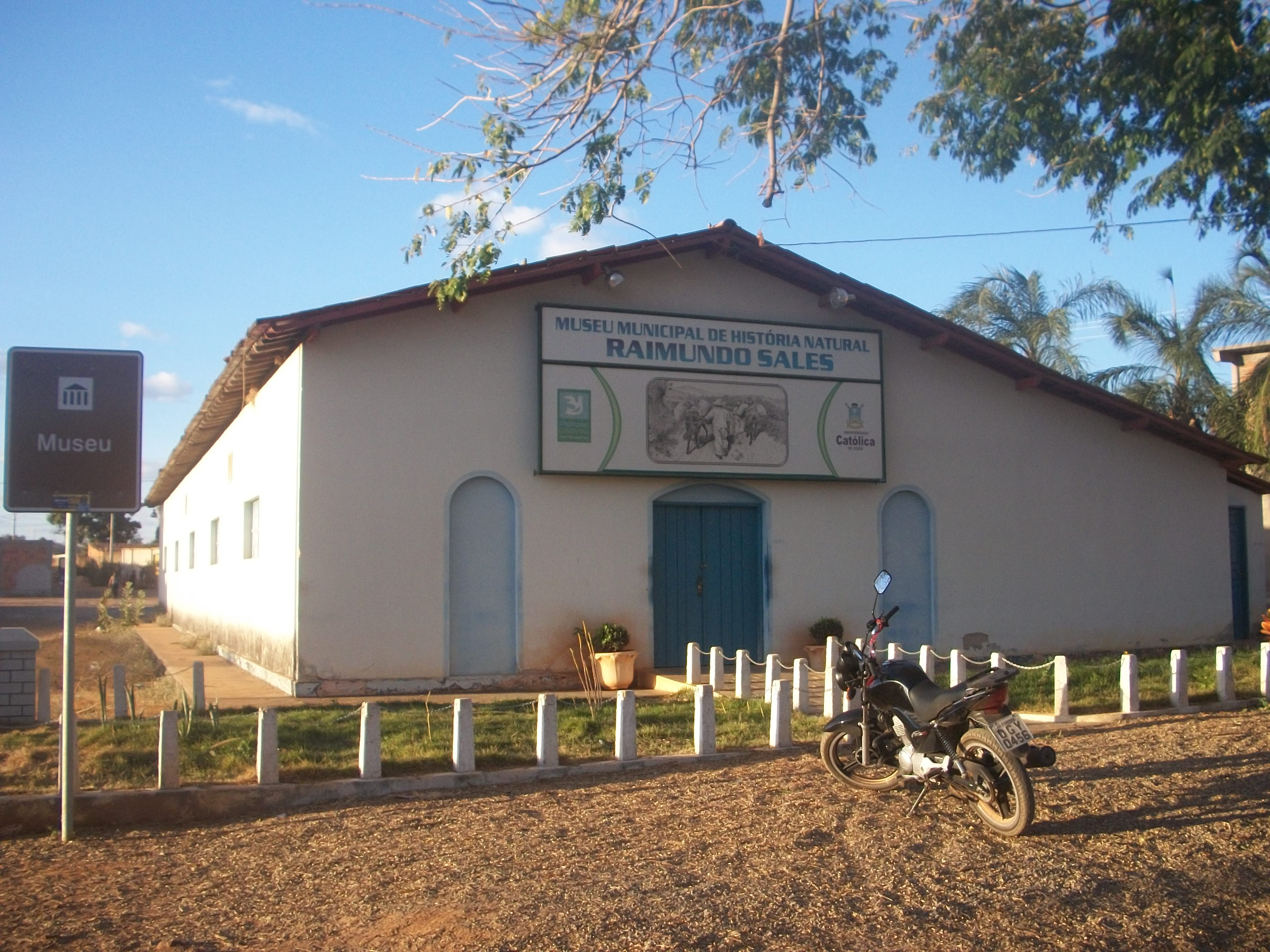
Municipal Museum of Natural History Raimundo Sales

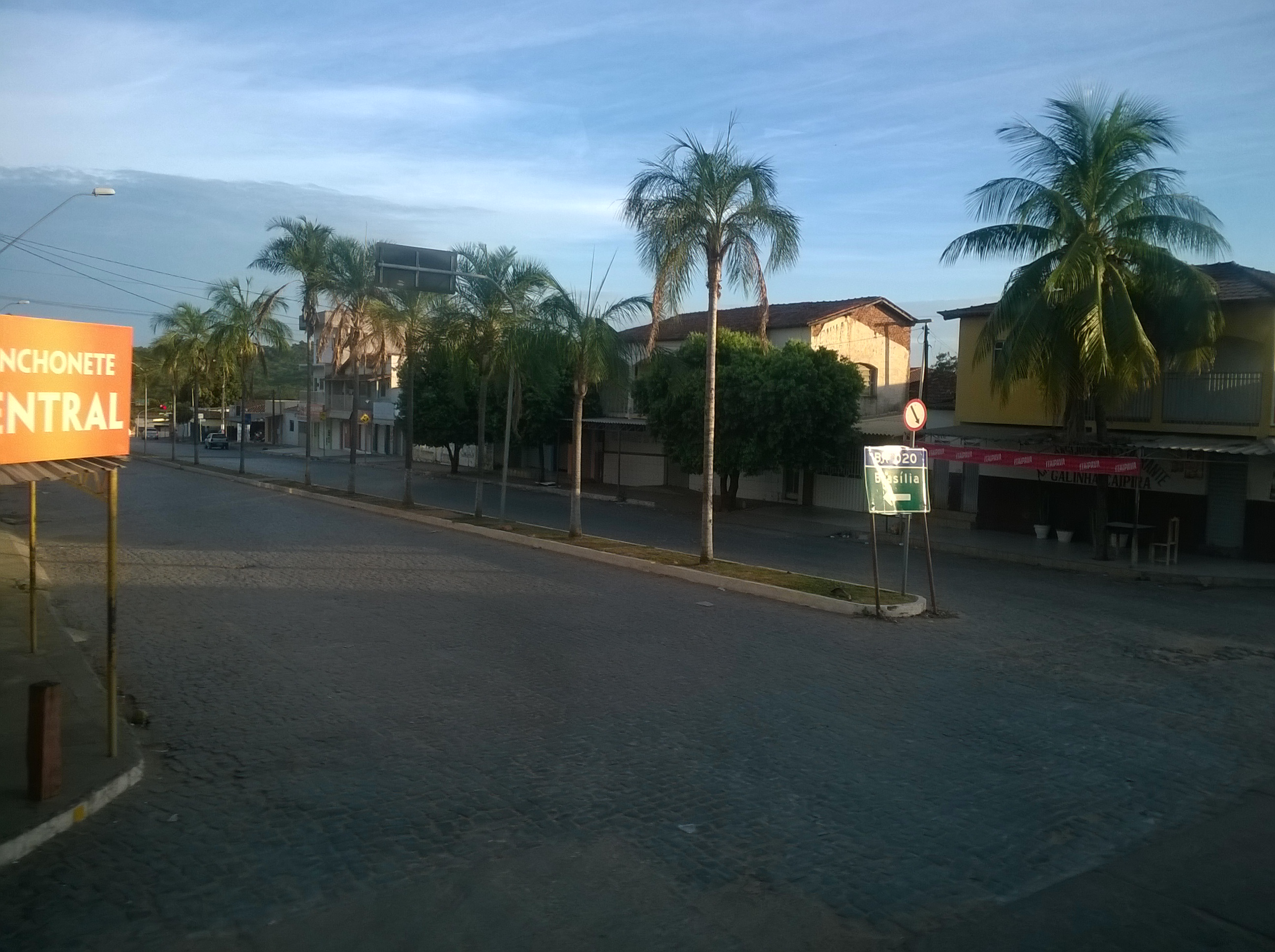
Avenue Tancredo Neves

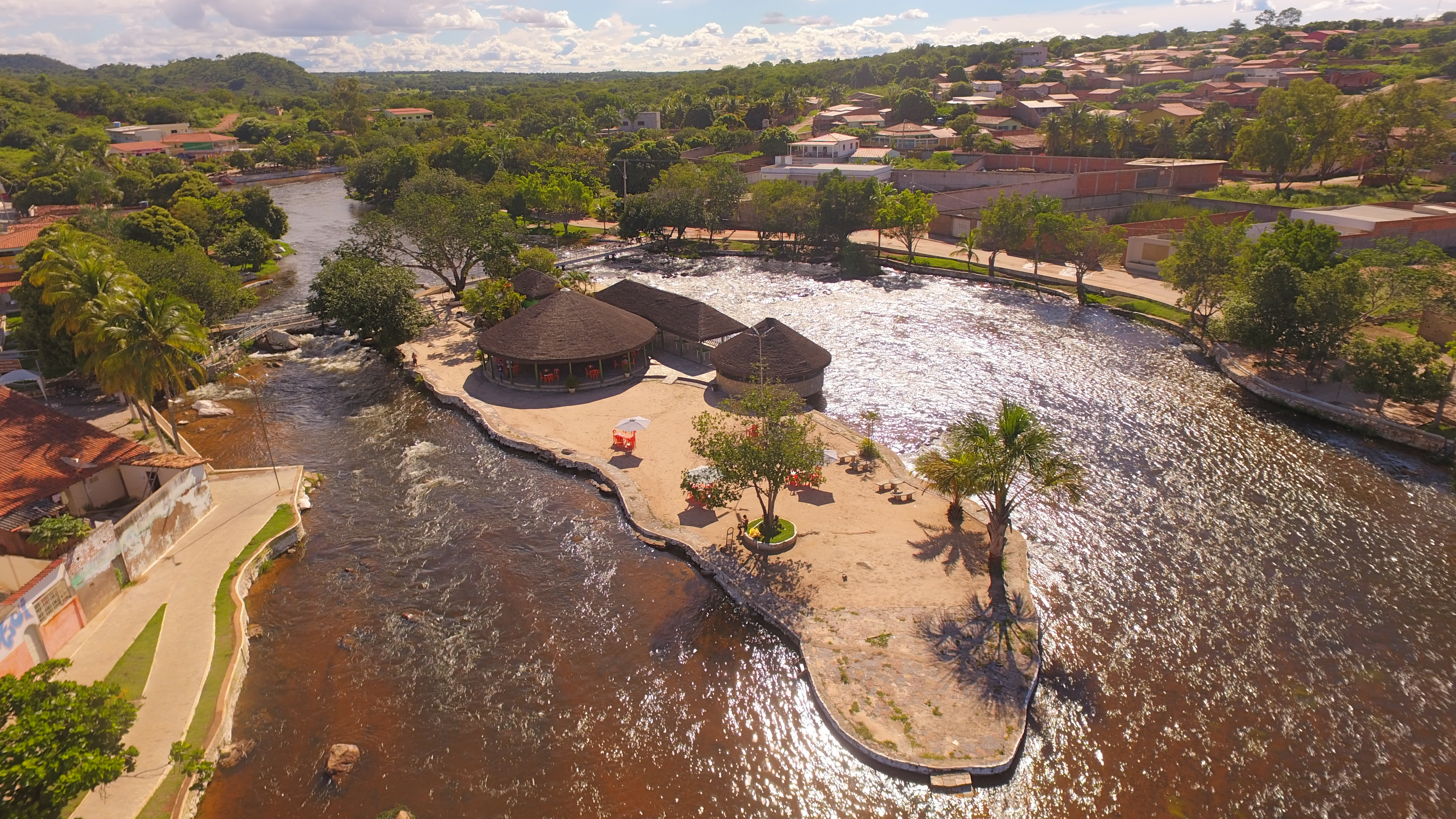
Aerial view of Ranchão Island

== See also ==
- List of municipalities in Bahia
