= Dos Porcos River (Bahia) =

Location
- Country: Brazil

Physical characteristics
- Source
  - location: Bahia state
- Mouth: Rio Grande
  - coordinates: 12°43′S 45°5′W

The Dos Porcos River is in the Bahia state of eastern Brazil.

== See also ==
- List of rivers of Bahia
