= Queimadas =

Queimadas may refer to:

- Queimadas, Bahia, a town in Bahia state, Brazil
- Queimadas, Paraíba, a town in Paraíba state, Brazil
- Queimadas, Cape Verde, a village on São Nicolau island, Cape Verde
