= Formoso River (Bahia) =

Location
- Country: Brazil

Physical characteristics
- Source
  - location: Bahia state
- Mouth: Corrente River
  - coordinates: 13°26′S 44°14′W

The Formoso River is a river of Bahia state in eastern Brazil.

== See also ==
- List of rivers of Bahia
