= Alcobaça River =

Alcobaça River may refer to:

- Alcobaça River (Brazil)
- Alcobaça River (Portugal)
