= Guará River =

Location
- Country: Brazil

Physical characteristics
- Source
  - location: Bahia state
- Mouth: Do Meio River
  - coordinates: 13°19′S 44°33′W

The Guará River is a river of Bahia state in eastern Brazil.

== See also ==
- List of rivers of Bahia
