= Sacraiú River =

Location
- Country: Brazil

Physical characteristics
- Source
  - location: Bahia state
- Mouth: Jacuípe River
  - coordinates: 11°54′S 39°27′W

The Sacraiú River is a river of Bahia state in eastern Brazil.

== See also ==
- List of rivers of Bahia
