= Carnaíba de Dentro River =

River in Bahia, Brazil

Location
- Country: Brazil

Physical characteristics
- Source
  - location: Bahia state
- Mouth: Das Rãs River
  - coordinates: 13°59′S 43°11′W

The Carnaíba de Dentro River is a river of Bahia state in eastern Brazil.

== See also ==
- List of rivers of Bahia
