= Das Balsas River (Bahia) =

Location
- Country: Brazil

Physical characteristics
- Source
  - location: Bahia state
- Mouth
  - location: Bahia
  - coordinates: 11.915040°S 45.661222°W

Basin features
- River system: Rio de Janeiro

The Das Balsas River is a river of Bahia state in eastern Brazil, a tributary of the Rio de Janeiro (Bahia).

== See also ==
- List of rivers of Bahia
