= Capivari River =

There are several rivers named Capivari River in Brazil:

- Capivari River (Bahia)
- Capivari River (Mato Grosso do Sul)
- Capivari River (Minas Gerais)
- Capivari River (Paraná)
- Capivari River (Paranapanema River)
- Capivari River (Pardo River tributary)
- Capivari River (Rio de Janeiro)
- Capivari River (Santa Catarina)
- Capivari River (Tietê River tributary)

== See also ==
- Capivara River (disambiguation)
- Capivari, a municipality in the state of São Paulo in Brazil
