= Itapicuru-Mirim River =

- Mouth location in Brazil

Location
- Country: Brazil

Physical characteristics
- Source
  - location: Bahia state
- Mouth
  - coordinates: 10°58′37″S 39°43′26″W

Basin features
- River system: Itapicuru River

The Itapicuru-Mirim River is a river of Bahia state in eastern Brazil. It is an important tributary of the Itapicuru River.

Numerous springs in the Sete Passagens State Park supply streams that contribute to the Itapicuru-Mirim River.

== See also ==
- List of rivers of Bahia
