= Rio de Janeiro (Bahia) =

Location
- Country: Brazil

Physical characteristics
- Source
  - location: Bahia state
- Mouth: Branco River
  - coordinates: 11°51′S 45°10′W

The Rio de Janeiro is a river of Bahia state in eastern Brazil.

== See also ==
- List of rivers of Bahia
