= Capivara River =

There are several rivers named Capivara River in Brazil:

- Capivara River (Araçuaí River tributary)
- Capivara River (Goiás)
- Capivara River (Paraná)
- Capivara River (Piauí)
- Capivara River (Roraima)
- Capivara River (Santa Tereza River tributary)
- Capivara River (São Paulo)
- Capivara River (Sergipe), a river of Sergipe
- Capivara River (Tocantins River tributary)

== See also ==
- Capivari River (disambiguation)
- Capivara, the Portuguese name of the rodent Capybara
- Capivaras River, Santa Catarina, Brazil
