= Peixe River (Paraguaçu River tributary) =

- Location within Brazil

Location
- Country: Brazil

Physical characteristics
- Source
  - location: Bahia state
- Mouth: Paraguaçu River
  - coordinates: 12°34′S 39°36′W

The Peixe River is a river of Bahia state in eastern Brazil.

== See also ==
- List of rivers of Bahia
