= Gavião River =

Coordinates: 14.0954°S 41.0954°W

Location
- Country: Brazil

Physical characteristics
- Source
  - location: Bahia state

The Gavião River is a river of Bahia state in eastern Brazil.

== See also ==
- List of rivers of Bahia
