= Das Ondas River =

Location
- Country: Brazil

Physical characteristics
- Source
  - location: Bahia state
- Mouth: Rio Grande
  - coordinates: 12°9′S 45°1′W

The Das Ondas River is a river of Bahia state in eastern Brazil.

== See also ==
- List of rivers of Bahia
