= Galheirão River =

Coordinates: 12°23′S 45°05′W

Location
- Country: Brazil

Physical characteristics
- Source
  - location: Bahia state

The Galheirão River is a river of Bahia state in eastern Brazil.

== See also ==
- List of rivers of Bahia
