= Maçacara River =

Location
- Country: Brazil

Physical characteristics
- Source
  - location: Bahia state
- Mouth: Itapicuru River
  - coordinates: 11°5′S 38°30′W

The Maçacara River is a river of Bahia state in eastern Brazil.

== See also ==
- List of rivers of Bahia
