= João de Tiba River =

River in Bahia, Brazil

Coordinates: 16°15′04″S 39°00′39″W

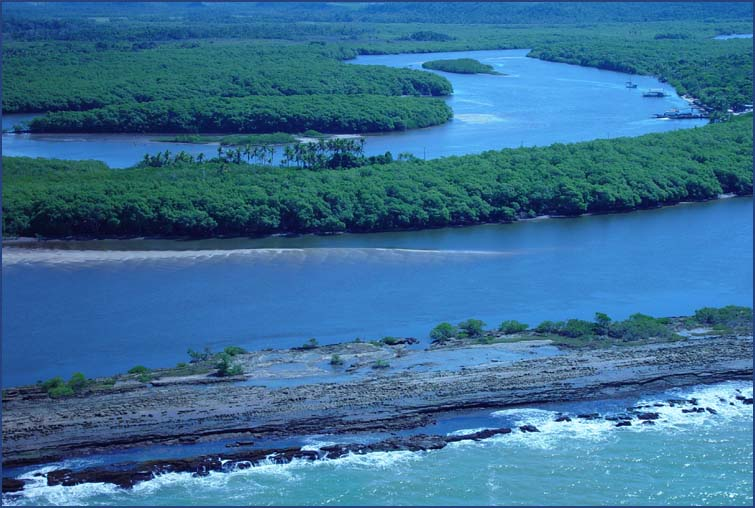

Location
- Country: Brazil

Physical characteristics
- Source
  - location: Bahia state

The João de Tiba River is a river of Bahia state in eastern Brazil.

== See also ==
- List of rivers of Bahia
