= Juazeiro River =

Coordinates: 12°29′56″S 42°38′23″W

Location
- Country: Brazil

Physical characteristics
- Source
  - location: Bahia state

The Juazeiro River is a river of Bahia state in eastern Brazil.

== See also ==
- List of rivers of Bahia
