= Santana River (Bahia) =

Location
- Country: Brazil

Physical characteristics
- Source
  - location: Bahia state
- Mouth: Cachoeira River
  - coordinates: 14°49′S 39°3′W

The Santana River is a river of Bahia state in eastern Brazil.

== See also ==
- List of rivers of Bahia
