= Pojuca River =

River in Bahia, Brazil

Coordinates: 12°35′50″S 38°01′49″W

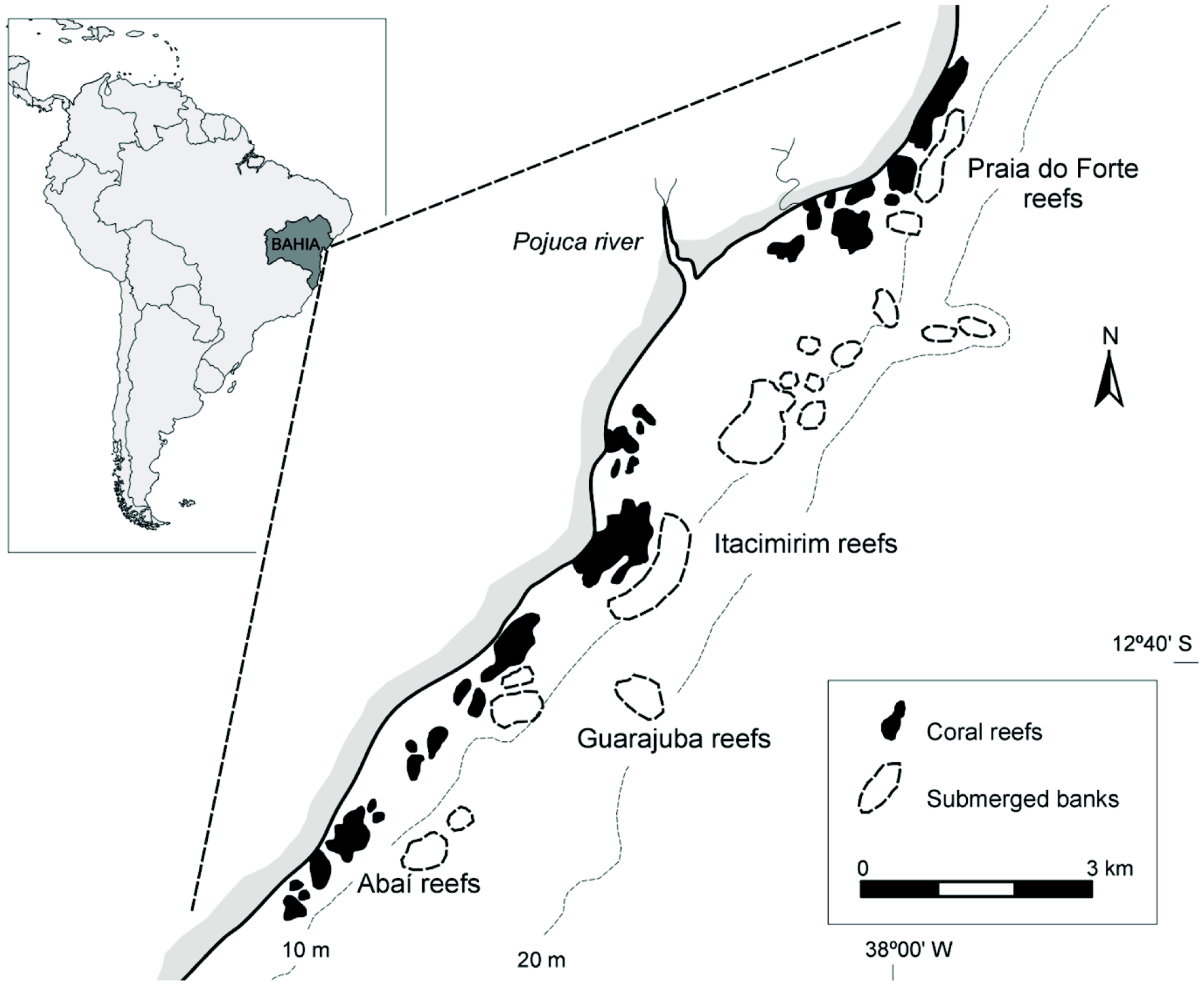

Location
- Country: Brazil

Physical characteristics
- Source
  - location: Bahia state

The Pojuca River is a river of Bahia state in eastern Brazil.

== See also ==
- List of rivers of Bahia
