= Branco River (Bahia) =

Location
- Country: Brazil

Physical characteristics
- Source
  - location: Bahia state
- Mouth: Rio Grande
  - coordinates: 12°0′S 44°56′W

The Branco River is a river of Bahia state in eastern Brazil.

== See also ==
- List of rivers of Bahia
