= Maiquinique River =

Coordinates: 15°27′57″S 39°55′29″W

Location
- Country: Brazil

Physical characteristics
- Source
  - location: Bahia state

The Maiquinique River is a river of Bahia state in eastern Brazil.

== See also ==
- List of rivers of Bahia
