= Curaçá River =

Location
- Country: Brazil

Physical characteristics
- Source
  - location: Bahia state
- Mouth: São Francisco River
  - coordinates: 9°2′S 39°58′W
- Length: 700.28 km (435.13 mi)

The Curaçá River is a river of Bahia state in eastern Brazil. Juazeiro is in reality part of a twin city called Petrolina-Juazeiro and it lies on the São Francisco River and the Curaçá River.

== See also ==
- List of rivers of Bahia
