= Pau Alto =

Pau Alto River

Location
- Country: Brazil

Physical characteristics
- Source
  - location: Bahia state
- Mouth: Atlantic Ocean
  - coordinates: 17°54′S 39°28′W

The Pau Alto River is a river of Bahia state in eastern Brazil.

== See also ==
- List of rivers of Bahia
