= Caravelas River =

River in Bahia, Brazil

- Location within Brazil
- Native name: Rio Caravelas (Portuguese)

Location
- Country: Brazil

Physical characteristics
- Mouth
  - location: Barra de Caravelas, Bahia, Brazil
  - coordinates: 17.743979°S 39.186784°W

The Caravelas River (Portuguese: Rio Caravelas) is a river that enters the Atlantic Ocean in the south of the state of Bahia, Brazil. The community of Caravelas is on the left shore of the river a few kilometres above its mouth.

The river flows through the Cassurubá Extractive Reserve, a 100,768 hectares (249,000 acres) sustainable use conservation unit that protects an area of mangroves, river and sea where shellfish are harvested.

== See also ==
- List of rivers of Bahia
