= Roda Velha River =

Coordinates: 12°27′S 45°21′W

Location
- Country: Brazil

Physical characteristics
- Source
  - location: Bahia state

The Roda Velha River is a river of Bahia state in eastern Brazil.

== See also ==
- List of rivers of Bahia
