= Santo Onofre River =

River in eastern Brazil

Coordinates: 12°11′S 43°13′W

Location
- Country: Brazil

Physical characteristics
- Source
  - location: Bahia state

The Santo Onofre River is a river of Bahia state in eastern Brazil.

== See also ==
- List of rivers of Bahia
