= Do Meio River (Bahia, Jequié River tributary) =

River of Bahia state in eastern Brazil (Jequié River)

Location
- Country: Brazil

Physical characteristics
- Source
  - location: Bahia state
- Mouth: Jequié River

The Do Meio River is a river of Bahia state in eastern Brazil. It is a tributary of the Jequié River.

== See also ==
- List of rivers of Bahia
