= Salitre River =

- Mouth location in Brazil
- Native name: Rio Salitre (Portuguese)

Location
- Country: Brazil

Physical characteristics
- Source
  - location: Bahia state
- Mouth
  - coordinates: 9°28′46″S 40°39′17″W

Basin features
- River system: São Francisco River

The Salitre River is a river of Bahia state in eastern Brazil. It is a right tributary of the São Francisco River.

The river basin includes part of the 46,000 hectares (110,000 acres) Morro do Chapéu State Park, created in 1998.

== See also ==
- List of rivers of Bahia
