= Itaguari River =

Coordinates: 14°16′50″S 44°24′41″W

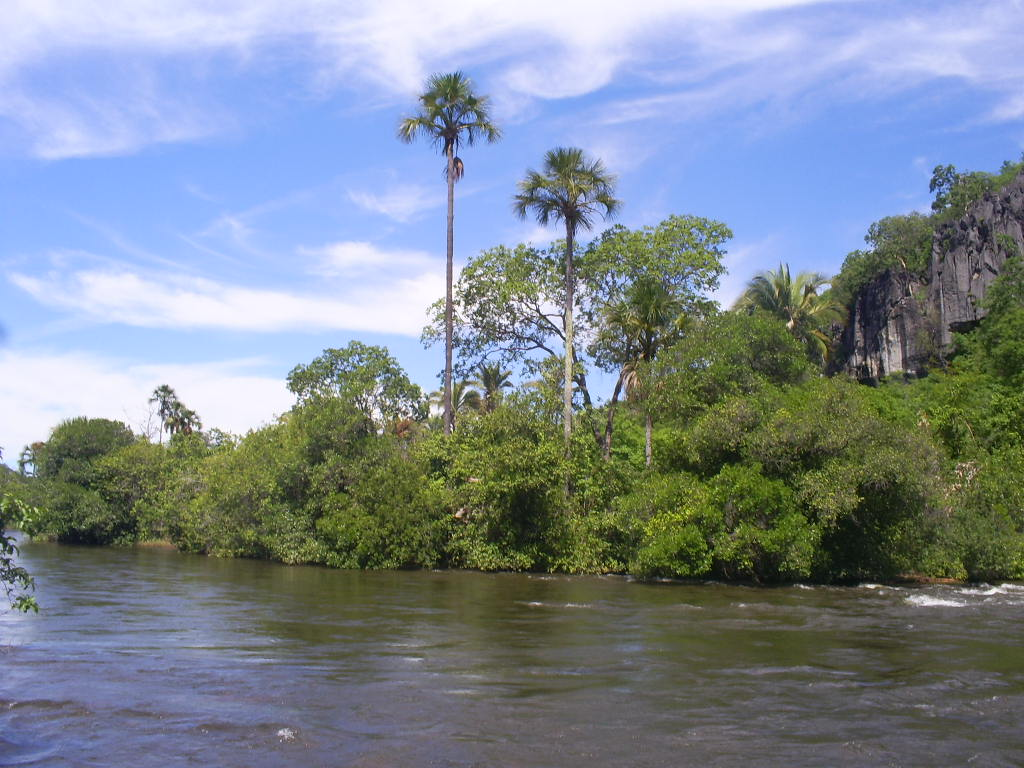

Location
- Country: Brazil

Physical characteristics
- Source
  - location: Bahia state

The Itaguari River is a river of Bahia state in eastern Brazil.

== See also ==
- List of rivers of Bahia
