= Cachoeira Grande River =

Coordinates: 13°45′S 39°08′W

Location
- Country: Brazil

Physical characteristics
- Source
  - location: Bahia state

The Cachoeira Grande River is a river of Bahia state in eastern Brazil.

== See also ==
- List of rivers of Bahia
