= Morro do Chapéu State Park =

State park in Bahia, Brazil

- Parque Estadual do Morro do Chapéu
- IUCN category II (national park)
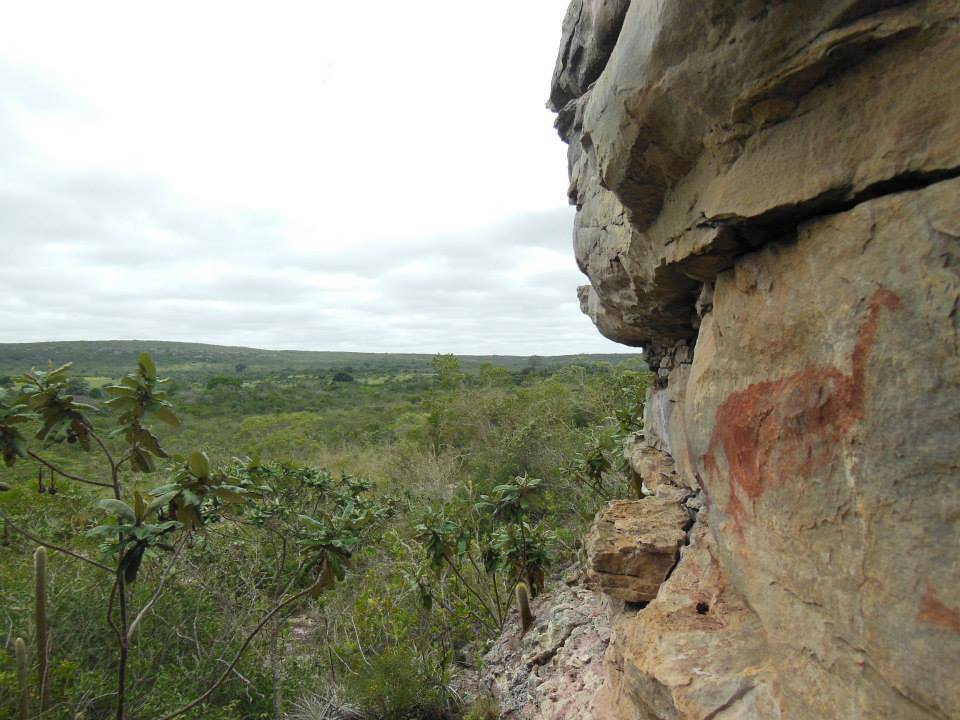
- Rock painting in the park.

- Location within Brazil
- Nearest city: Morro do Chapéu, Bahia
- Coordinates: 11°22′56″S 41°17′03″W
- Area: 46,000 ha (180 sq mi)
- Designation: State park
- Created: 17 August 1998
- Administrator: Superintendência de Desenvolvimento Florestal e Unidades de Conservação

The Morro do Chapéu State Park Portuguese: Parque Estadual do Morro do Chapéu is a state park in the state of Bahia, Brazil. It protects an area of the caatinga biome that includes interesting geological formations and prehistoric cave paintings. There have been extended delays in physically implementing the park, and an attempt was made in 2011 to cancel it.

== Location ==
The Morro do Chapéu State Park is in the municipality of Morro do Chapéu, Bahia. It has an area of 46,000 hectares (110,000 acres). The park is in a part of the Chapada Diamantina which has great scenic beauty and potential for tourism. The park contains sub-basins of the Salitre, Jacaré, Utinga and Jacuípe rivers. These in turn feed the Paraguaçu and São Francisco rivers. 543 important springs have been catalogued, and the site has potential to function as a geopark. It also contains archaeological sites with cave paintings. The paintings in the Brejões, Boa Esperança, Igrejinha and Cristal caves demand special protection.

== History ==
The Morro do Chapéu State Park was created by decree 23.682 of 12 December 1973, but no action was taken to implement the park. An event on conservation of nature sponsored by the municipality of Morro do Chapéu and the state planning department was held in 1985 and called for measures to implement the park. The Geological Service of Brazil (CPRM) presented a report in December 1995 that included plans for infrastructure and tourist sites, and gave environmental information, risk factors and speleological and archaeological studies. Based on this, the state's department of forest development reopened the question of the park's area, and commissioned a study on alternatives for the location of the park.

The Morro do Chapéu State Park was recreated by state decree 7.413 of 17 August 1998. The objectives are to protect species of rare and endangered animals, to protect vegetation in the ecotone where the cerrado and caatinga meet, and to protect archaeological sites. In 2008, at the request of the state secretariat of the environment, a team from the State University of Feira de Santana concluded a study for a new polygon to define the area of the park. As of 2011 problems had been caused by opening a road inside the park, hunting, deforestation, logging and complete lack of surveillance, particularly in the west of the park. Land owners had still not been compensated.

Decree 12.744 of 12 April 2011 extinguished the park. The state prosecutor's office quickly issued a recommendation detailing legal reasons why the park should be preserved. On 3 May 2011 Governor Jaques Wagner signed decree 12.810, which cancelled decree 12.744 and gave the Environmental Secretariat (Sema) 90 days to prepare technical environmental studies, land surveys and a proposal to regularize land ownership. As of 2016 land ownership had yet to be fully regularized.

== Environment ==
The vegetation is mainly from the caatinga biome, notably orchids, bromeliads and cacti. Areas with shrubs and herbaceous vegetation form natural gardens on rocky outcrops. There are also areas of dunes. The presence of big cats shows the high degree of conservation. Threats include deforestation, burning, sand mining, predatory hunting and squatters.

In 2012 environmentalists expressed concern about the impact of construction of wind turbines in the vicinity. The area is ideal for wind farms, with consistent strong winds channelled by the hills. However, construction of roads and tracks, and explosions to build the foundations might drive out the population of cougars. The counter-arguments advanced by the Brazilian Wind Energy Association (Abeeólica) are that there is proof that wild animals return and with modern methods that vegetation recovers fast, and the increased surveillance of the park will deter hunting, illegal logging and sand mining.

== Sources ==
- Anulado decreto que extinguiu o Parque Estadual Morro do Chapéu (in Portuguese), Ministério Público do Estado da Bahia, 3 May 2011
- Barbosa, Ademário (28 April 2011), "Breve Histórico do Parque Estadual de Morro do Chapéu - Bahia", Geografia do Piemonte (in Portuguese)
- Calheiros, Celso (11 April 2012), "Energia eólica entra em choque com a conservação na Bahia", O Eco (in Portuguese)
- Parque Estadual do Morro do Chapéu (in Portuguese), INEMA: Instituto do Meio Ambiente e Recursos Hídricos
- PES Morro do Chapéu (in Portuguese), ISA: Instituto Socioambiental
