= Saracura River =

Coordinates: 12°19′47″S 40°06′43″W

Location
- Country: Brazil

Physical characteristics
- Source
  - location: Bahia state

The Saracura River is a river of Bahia state in eastern Brazil.

== See also ==
- List of rivers of Bahia
