= Preto River (Bahia, Atlantic Ocean) =

Location
- Country: Brazil

Physical characteristics
- Source
  - location: Bahia state
- Mouth: Atlantic Ocean
  - elevation: Sea level

The Preto River is a river of Bahia state in eastern Brazil.

== See also ==
- List of rivers of Bahia
