= Pratudão River =

Coordinates: 13°55′32″S 44°54′15″W

Location
- Country: Brazil

Physical characteristics
- Source
  - location: Bahia state

The Pratudão River is a river of Bahia state in eastern Brazil.

== See also ==
- List of rivers of Bahia
