= Arrojado River =

Coordinates: 13°24′S 44°20′W

Location
- Country: Brazil

Physical characteristics
- Source
  - location: Bahia state

The Arrojado River is a river of Bahia state in eastern Brazil.

== See also ==
- List of rivers of Bahia
