= Paramirim River =

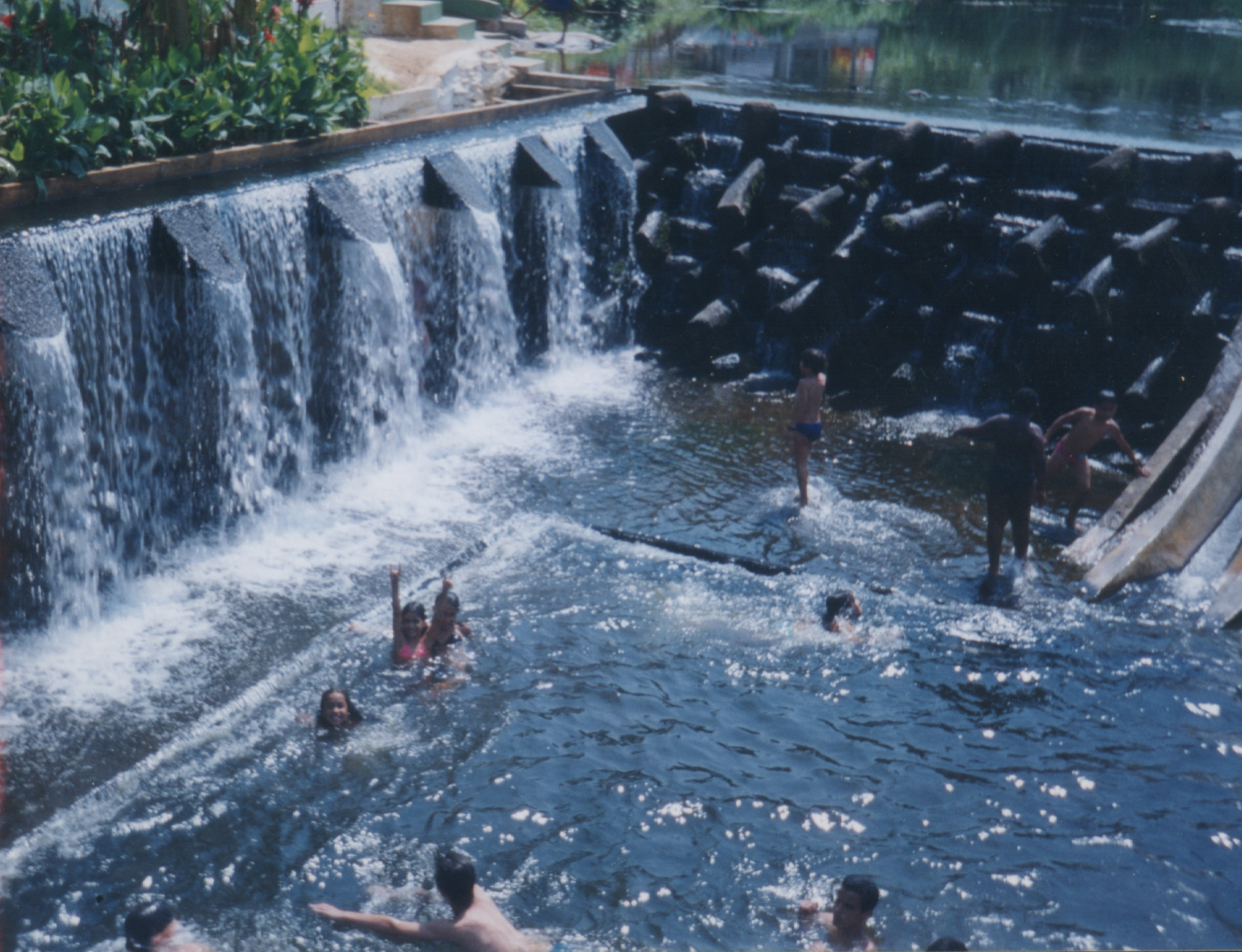

Location
- Country: Brazil

Physical characteristics
- Source
  - location: Bahia state
- Mouth: São Francisco River
  - coordinates: 11°34′S 43°18′W

The Paramirim River is a river of Bahia state in eastern Brazil.

== See also ==
- List of rivers of Bahia
