= Catolé Grande River =

Coordinates: 15°21′42″S 40°08′33″W

Location
- Country: Brazil

Physical characteristics
- Source
  - location: Bahia state

The Catolé Grande River is a river of Bahia state in eastern Brazil.

== See also ==
- List of rivers of Bahia
