= Peixe River (Itapicuru River tributary) =

River in Bahia, Brazil; tributary of Itapicuru River

Location
- Country: Brazil

Physical characteristics
- Source
  - location: Bahia state
- Mouth: Itapicuru River
  - coordinates: 10°59′S 39°40′W

The Peixe River (Itapicuru River) is a river in Bahia state in eastern Brazil. It is a tributary of the Itapicuru River in the municipality of Queimadas.

== See also ==
- List of rivers of Bahia
