= Tijuípe River =

River in Bahia, Brazil

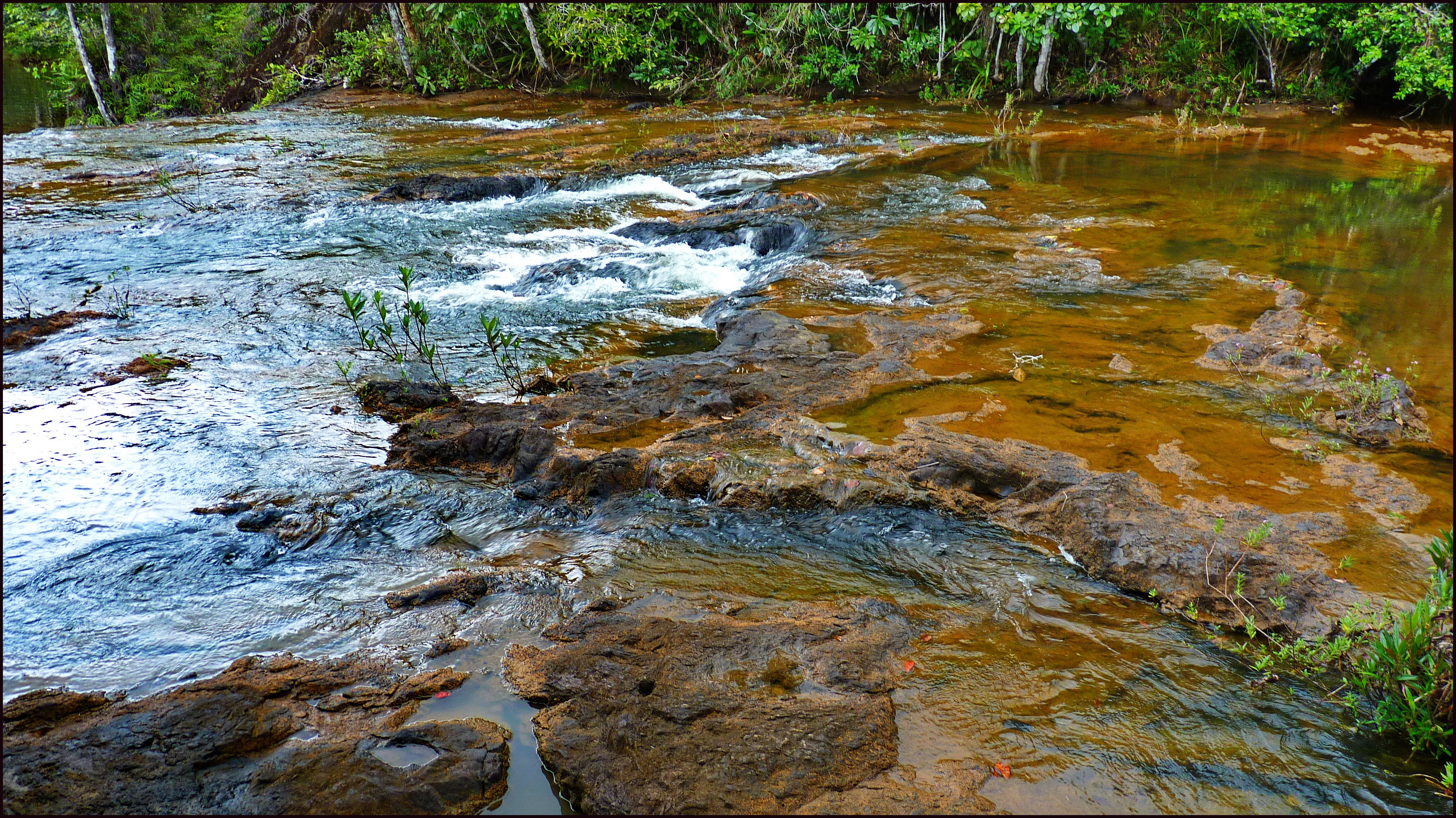

Location
- Country: Brazil

Physical characteristics
- Source
  - location: Bahia state
- Mouth: Atlantic Ocean
  - coordinates: 14°25′S 39°1′W

The Tijuípe River is a river of Bahia state in eastern Brazil.

== See also ==
- List of rivers of Bahia
