= São Desidério River =

Coordinates: 12°19′12″S 45°01′20″W

Location
- Country: Brazil

Physical characteristics
- Source
  - location: Bahia state

The São Desidério River is a river of Bahia state in eastern Brazil.

== See also ==
- List of rivers of Bahia
