= Do Frade River =

River in Bahia, Brazil

Location
- Country: Brazil

Physical characteristics
- Source
  - location: Bahia state
- Mouth: Atlantic Ocean
  - coordinates: 16°41′S 39°6′W

The Do Frade River is a river of Bahia state in eastern Brazil.

== See also ==
- List of rivers of Bahia
