= Paulista River =

Coordinates: 12°17′20″S 39°50′27″W

Location
- Country: Brazil

Physical characteristics
- Source
  - location: Bahia state

The Paulista River is a river of Bahia state in eastern Brazil.

== See also ==
- List of rivers of Bahia
