= Paratiji River =

Location
- Country: Brazil

Physical characteristics
- Source
  - location: Bahia state
- Mouth: Paraguaçu River
  - coordinates: 12°31′S 39°23′W

The Paratiji River is a river of Bahia state in eastern Brazil.

== See also ==
- List of rivers of Bahia
