= Jucurucu River =

River in Minas Gerais and Bahia states, Brazil

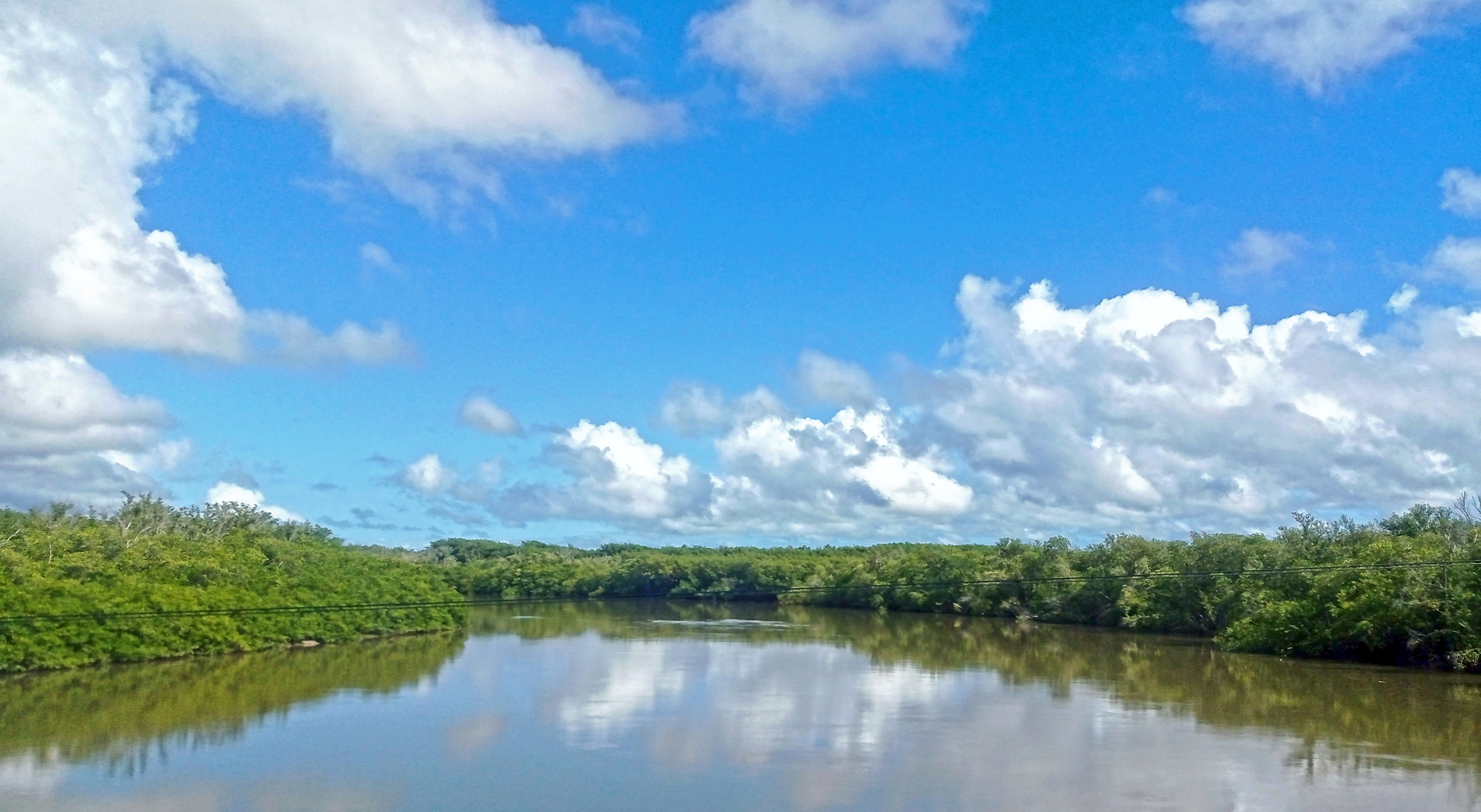

- Location within Brazil

Location
- Country: Brazil

Physical characteristics
- Source
  - location: Minas Gerais state
- Mouth: Atlantic Ocean
  - location: Bahia state
  - coordinates: 17°23′S 39°12′W

The Jucurucu River is a river flowing through the Bahia and Minas Gerais states in eastern Brazil.

== See also ==
- List of rivers of Bahia
- List of rivers of Minas Gerais
