= Itanhém River =

River in Bahia, Brazil

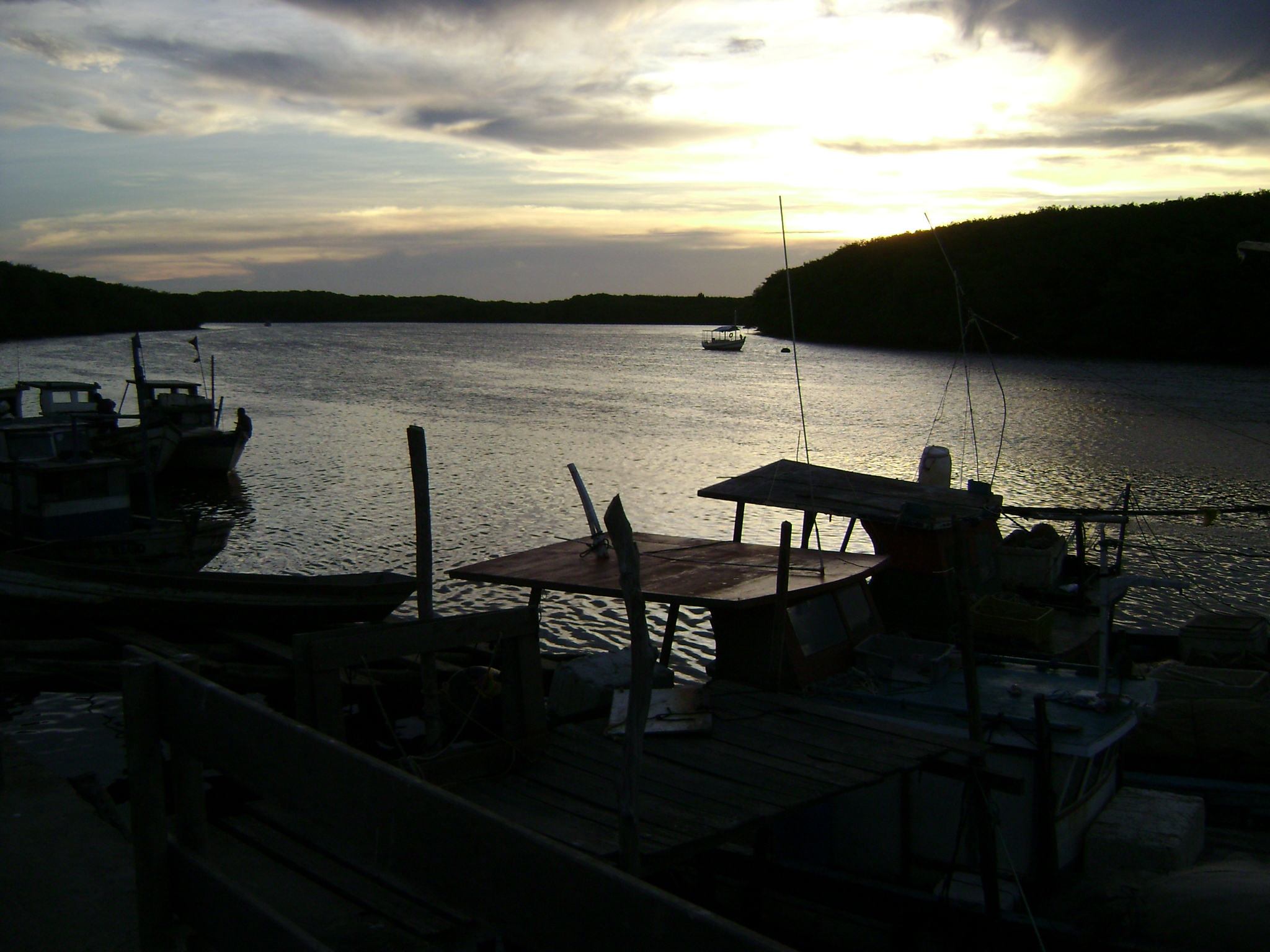

- Location within Brazil

Location
- Country: Brazil

Physical characteristics
- Source
  - location: Bahia state
- Mouth: Atlantic Ocean
  - coordinates: 17°32′S 39°12′W

The Itanhém River is a river of Bahia state in eastern Brazil. The Itanhém River, also called the Alcobaça River, cuts through the Bahia municipalities of Alcobaça and Itanhém, and flows into Barra do Itanhém Beach in Alcobaça. It is born from the Machacalis in the municipality of Fronteira dos Vales, state of Minas Gerais, and runs from west to east to the mouth of Alcobaça in Bahia, where it flows into the Atlantic Ocean. This river used to be the main access of the white colonizers originating from the Vila de Caravelas to the sertão baiano. The most common fish found in the river Itanhém are: cordata, traíra, piaú, catfish and cascudo. But there are some crustaceans like pitu and shrimp.

== See also ==
- List of rivers of Bahia
