= Rio Verde (Bahia) =

Location
- Country: Brazil

Physical characteristics
- Source
  - location: Bahia state
- Mouth: São Francisco River
  - coordinates: 10°27′S 42°19′W

Rio Verde (Portuguese for "green river") is a river of Bahia state in eastern Brazil.

== See also ==
- List of rivers of Bahia
