= Piau River =

Location
- Country: Brazil

Physical characteristics
- Source
  - location: Bahia state
- Mouth: Una River
  - coordinates: 13°22′S 39°10′W

The Piau River is a river of Bahia state in eastern Brazil. It is a tributary of the Una River.

== See also ==
- List of rivers of Bahia
