= Santo Antônio River (Bahia) =

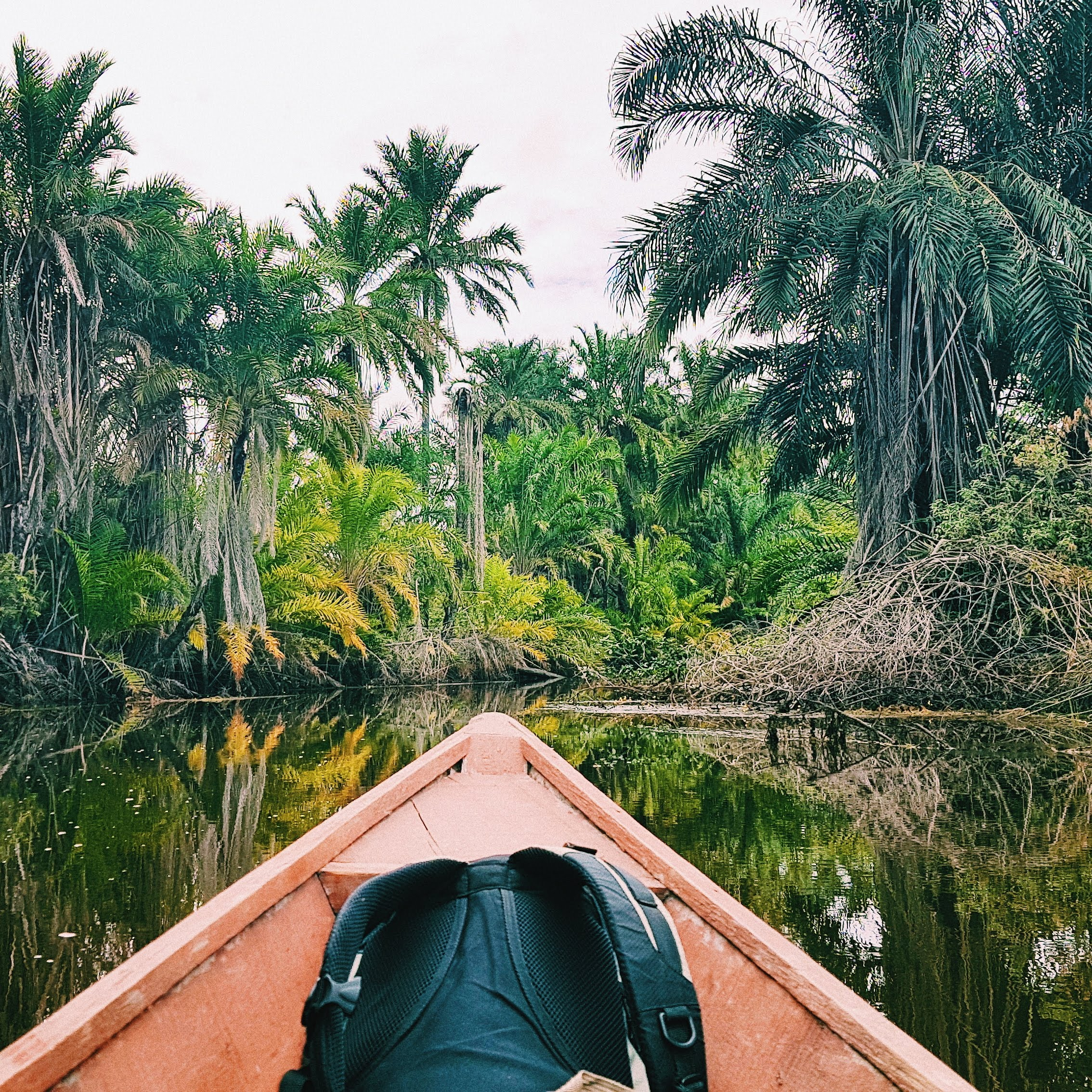

Location
- Country: Brazil

Physical characteristics
- Source
  - location: Bahia state
- Mouth
  - coordinates: 12°46′S 41°16′W

The Santo Antônio River is a river of Bahia state in eastern Brazil. It is a tributary of the Paraguaçu River.

== See also ==
- List of rivers of Bahia
