= Una River (Itaete, Bahia) =

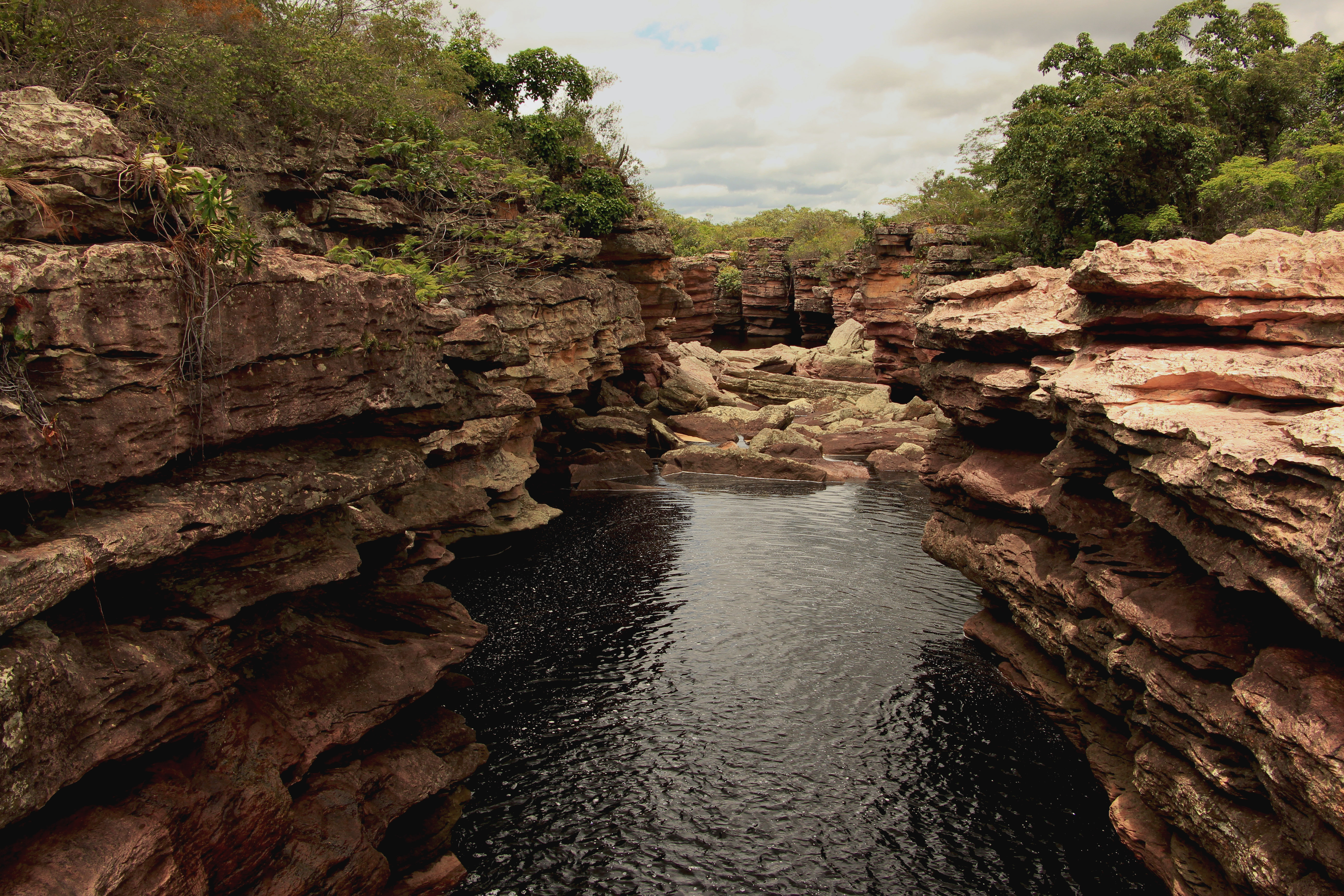

- Location within Brazil
- Native name: Rio Una (Portuguese)

Location
- Country: Brazil

Physical characteristics
- Mouth
  - coordinates: 12.924702°S 41.056007°W

Basin features
- River system: Paraguaçu River

The Una River is a river of Bahia state in eastern Brazil. It is a small river that starts in Serra Geral and flows near Iramaia (in the Centro Sul Baiano mesoregion) before discharging into the Paraguaçu River.

== See also ==
- List of rivers of Bahia
