= Capivari River (Bahia) =

Location
- Country: Brazil

Physical characteristics
- Source
  - location: Bahia state
- Mouth: Paraguaçu River
  - coordinates: 12°31′S 39°56′W

The Capivari River is a river of Bahia state in eastern Brazil.

== See also ==
- List of rivers of Bahia
