= Caraíva River =

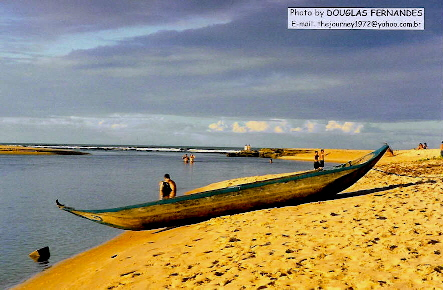

- Location within Brazil

Location
- Country: Brazil

Physical characteristics
- Source
  - location: Bahia state
- Mouth
  - location: Caraíva, Porto Seguro, Bahia
  - coordinates: 16.799722°S 39.144167°W

The Caraíva River is a river of Bahia state in eastern Brazil.

There are mangroves in good condition at the mouth of the river, which empties into the sea in the Corumbau Marine Extractive Reserve, a protected fishing area of 89,597 hectares (221,400 acres).

== See also ==
- List of rivers of Bahia
