= List of rivers of Bahia =

List of rivers in Bahia (Brazilian State).

The list is arranged by drainage basin from north to south, with respective tributaries indented under each larger stream's name and ordered from downstream to upstream. All rivers in Bahia drain to the Atlantic Ocean.

== By Drainage Basin ==
=== São Francisco Basin ===
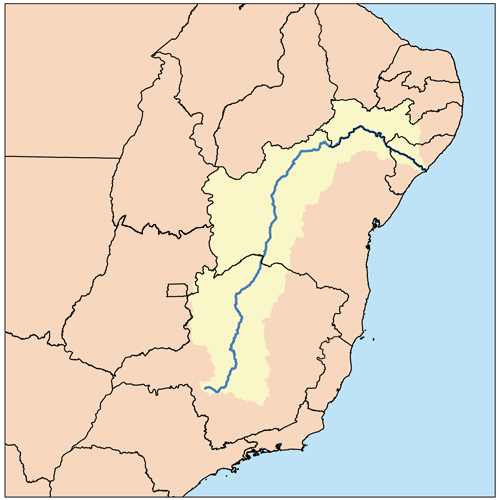
Map of the São Francisco basin

- São Francisco River
  - Curaçá River
  - Salitre River
  - Jacaré River
  - Vereda Pimenteira
  - Verde River
  - Grande River
    - Preto River
      - Do Ouro River
      - Riachão River
      - Sapão River
    - Branco River
      - Rio de Janeiro
        - Das Balsas River
    - Das Ondas River
      - Das Pedras River
    - São Desidério River
    - Das Fêmeas River
      - Galheirão River
      - Roda Velha River
    - Das Porcos River
  - Paramirim River
    - Juazeiro River
  - Santo Onofre River
  - Corrente River
    - Das Éguas River (Correntina River)
      - Arrojado River
    - Do Meio River
      - Guará River
    - Formoso River
      - Pratudão River
  - Das Rãs River
    - Carnaíba de Dentro River
    - Carnaíba de Fora River
  - Carinhanha River
    - Itaguari River
  - Verde Grande River
    - Verde Pequeno River

=== Atlantic Coast ===
- Vaza-Barris River
- Real River
- Itapicuru River
  - Maçacara River
  - Cariaçã River
  - Jacuriaí River
  - Peixe River
    - Pedra d'Água River
  - Itapicuru-Açu River
  - Itapicuru-Mirim River
- Pojuca River
- Jacuípe River
  - Sacraiú River
- Paraguaçu River
  - Paratiji River
  - Peixe River
    - Paulista River
  - Capivari River
    - Saracura River
  - Santo Antônio River
    - Utinga River
  - Una River
- Das Almas River (Jequiriçá River)
- Una River
  - Piau River
- Jequié River
  - Preto River
- Cachoeira Grande River
- De Contas River
  - Gongogi River
  - Jacaré River
  - Gavião River
  - Brumado River
- Tijuípe River
- Almada River
- Cachoeira River (Do Engenho River)
  - Itacanoeira River
  - Santana River
  - Colônia River
- Una River
- Pardo River
  - Maiquinique River
  - Catolé Grande River
- Jequitinhonha River (the Rio Grande do Belmonte)
- João de Tiba River
- Buranhém River
- Do Frade River
- Caraíva River
- Jucurucu River
- Itanhaém River (Alcobaça River)
- Caravelas River
- Peruípe River
  - Peruípe River (Braço Norte)
  - Peruípe River (Braço Sul)
    - Do Meio River
- Pau Alto River
- Mucuri River

== Alphabetically ==
- Almada River
- Das Almas River (Jequiriçá River)
- Arrojado River
- Das Balsas River
- Branco River
- Brumado River
- Buranhém River
- Cachoeira River (Do Engenho River)
- Cachoeira Grande River
- Capivari River
- Caraíva River
- Caravelas River
- Cariaçã River
- Carinhanha River
- Carnaíba de Dentro River
- Carnaíba de Fora River
- Catolé Grande River
- Colônia River
- De Contas River
- Corrente River
- Curaçá River
- Das Éguas River (Correntina River)
- Das Fêmeas River
- Do Frade River
- Formoso River
- Galheirão River
- Gavião River
- Gongogi River
- Grande River
- Guará River
- Itacanoeira River
- Itaguari River
- Itanhém River
- Itapicuru River
- Itapicuru-Açu River
- Itapicuru-Mirim River
- Jacaré River
- Jacaré River
- Jacuípe River
- Jacuriaí River
- Jequié River
- Jequitinhonha River
- João de Tiba River
- Juazeiro River
- Jucurucu River
- Maçacara River
- Maiquinique River
- Do Meio River
- Do Meio River
- Do Meio River
- Mucuri River
- Das Ondas River
- Do Ouro River
- Paraguaçu River
- Paramirim River
- Paratiji River
- Pardo River
- Pau Alto River
- Paulista River
- Pedra d'Água River
- Das Pedras River
- Peixe River
- Peixe River
- Peruípe River
- Peruípe River (Braço Norte)
- Peruípe River (Braço Sul)
- Piau River
- Pojuca River
- Das Porcos River
- Pratudão River
- Preto River
- Preto River
- Das Rãs River
- Real River
- Riachão River
- Rio de Janeiro
- Roda Velha River
- Sacraiú River
- Salitre River
- Santana River
- Santo Antônio River
- Santo Onofre River
- São Desidério River
- São Francisco River
- Sapão River
- Saracura River
- Tijuípe River
- Una River
- Una River
- Una River
- Utinga River
- Vaza-Barris River
- Verde Grande River
- Verde Pequeno River
- Verde River
- Vereda Pimenteira
