= Rio Verde Grande =

- Mouth location in Brazil

Location
- Country: Brazil

Physical characteristics
- Source
  - location: Minas Gerais
- Mouth
  - coordinates: 14°33′42″S 43°52′35″W

Rio Verde Grande (Portuguese for "big green river") is a river of Minas Gerais state in eastern Brazil, that forms the boundary with Bahia state in its lowest reaches. It is a tributary of the São Francisco River.

The Caminho dos Gerais State Park protects the sources of the Verde Pequeno River, a tributary of the Rio Verde Grande, which in turn is a tributary of the São Francisco River.

== See also ==
- List of rivers of Minas Gerais
- List of rivers of Bahia

== Sources ==
- Lucas, Fernando (27 April 2007), "Parque Estadual Caminhos dos Gerais prestes a se tornar realidade", Jornal da Serra Geral (in Portuguese), archived from the original on 2017-01-31
