= Jacuípe River (Bahia) =

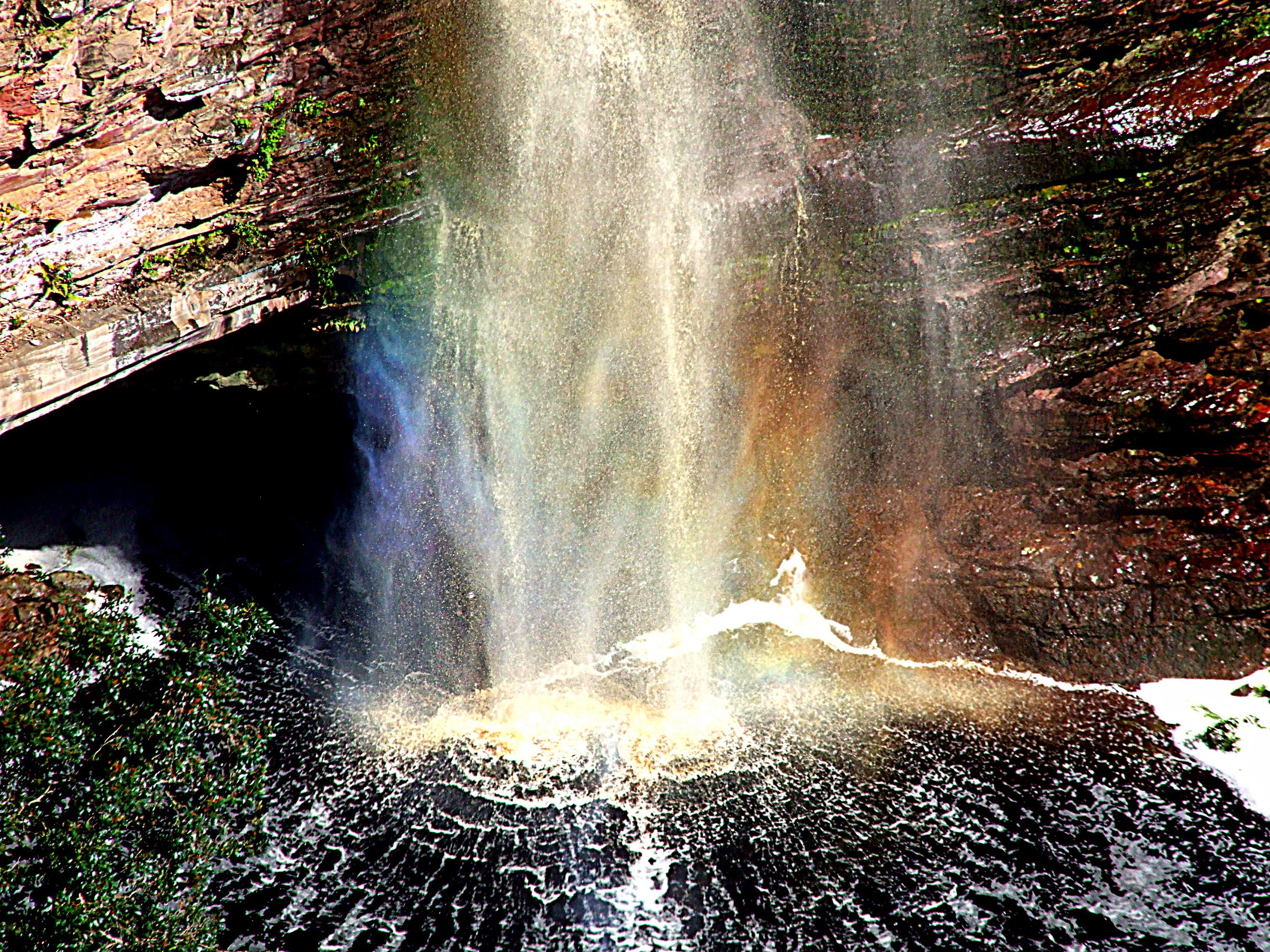
- Source of the river

- Mouth location in Brazil

Location
- Country: Brazil

Physical characteristics
- Source
  - location: Bahia state
- Mouth
  - coordinates: 12°23′58″S 39°01′05″W

The Jacuípe River is a river of Bahia state in eastern Brazil. It is a tributary of the Paraguaçu River,

The upper river basin includes part of the 46,000 hectares (110,000 acres) Morro do Chapéu State Park, created in 1998.

== See also ==
- List of rivers of Bahia
