= Do Meio River (Bahia, Corrente River tributary) =

Location
- Country: Brazil

Physical characteristics
- Source
  - location: Bahia state
- Mouth: Corrente River
  - coordinates: 13°20′S 44°34′W

The Do Meio River is a river of Bahia state in eastern Brazil. It is a tributary of the Corrente River.

== See also ==
- List of rivers of Bahia
