= Itapicuru-Açu River =

Coordinates: 10°55′05″S 39°51′20″W

Location
- Country: Brazil

Physical characteristics
- Source
  - location: Bahia state

The Itapicuru-Açu River is a river of Bahia state in eastern Brazil.

== See also ==
- List of rivers of Bahia
