= Una River (Valença, Bahia) =

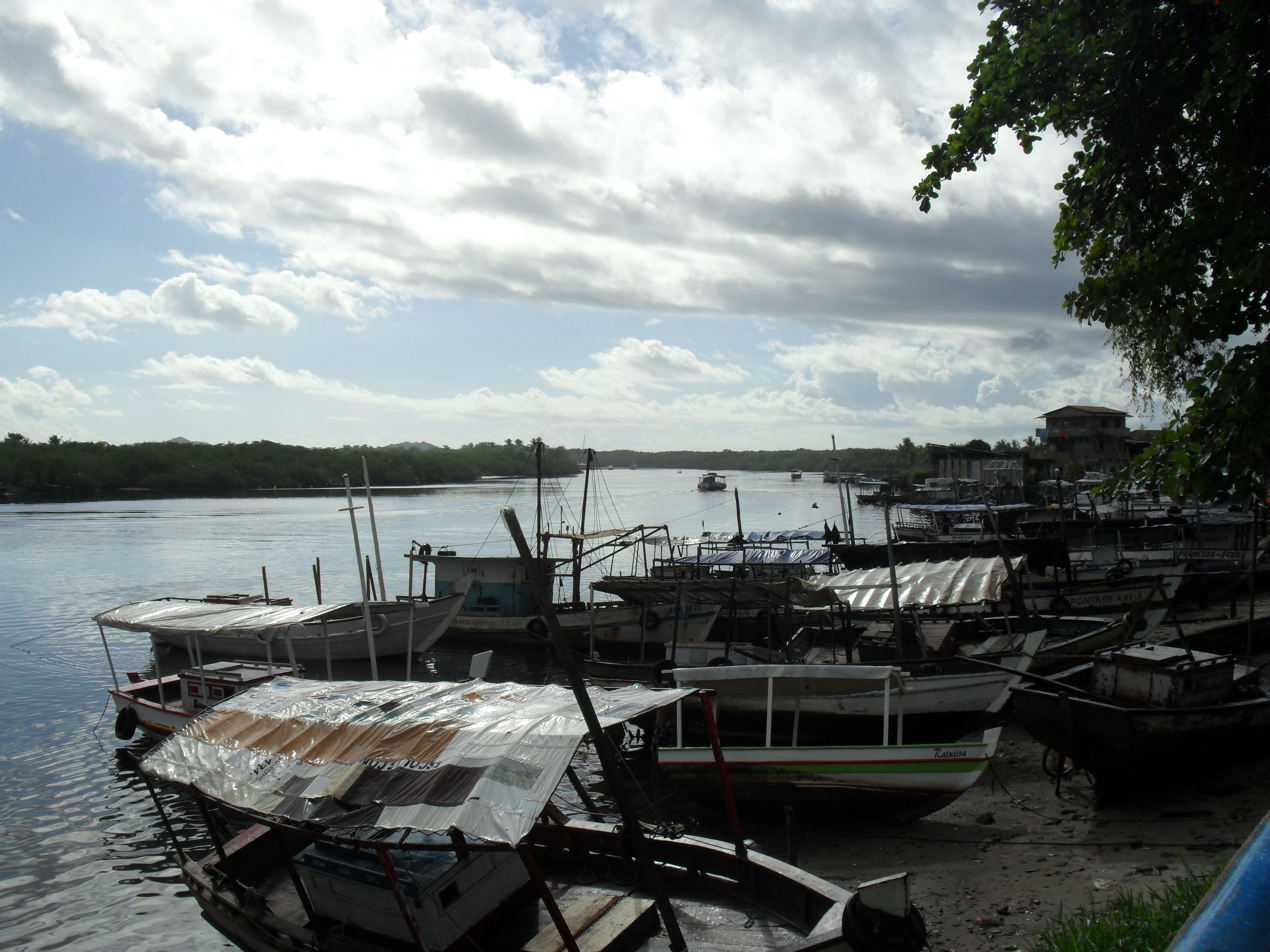

- Location within Brazil
- Native name: Rio Una (Portuguese)

Location
- Country: Brazil

Physical characteristics
- Mouth
  - location: Atlantic Ocean
  - coordinates: 13.379495°S 39.045277°W

Basin features
- River system: Una River

The Una River is a river of Bahia state in eastern Brazil. It discharges into the Atlantic Ocean after flowing past the town of Valença. The mouth of the river, in the form of a delta, contains 26 islands, the largest of which is Tinharé, where the Morro de São Paulo is located.

== See also ==
- List of rivers of Bahia
