= Queimadas, Bahia =

Municipality of Bahia, Brazil

Coordinates: 10°58′40″S 39°37′26″W

Queimadas
- Municipality
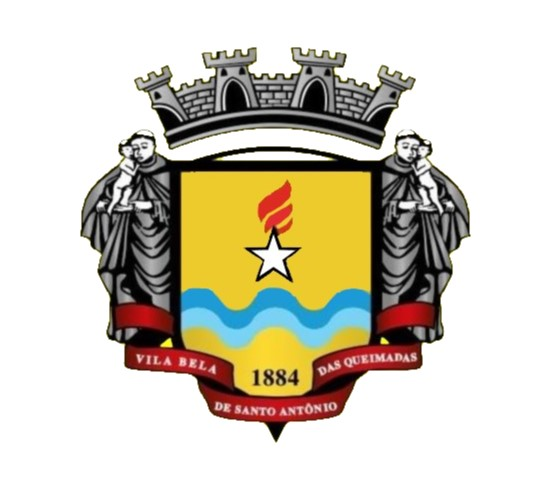
- Flag Coat of arms
- Interactive map of Queimadas
- Country: Brazil
- Region: Nordeste
- State: Bahia

Population (2020)
  - Total: 25,433
- Time zone: UTC−3 (BRT)

Queimadas is a municipality in the state of Bahia in the North-East region of Brazil. The city is located at a distance of approximately 300 km from the state capital, Salvador, and situated at a latitude of 10º58'42" south and a longitude of 39º37'35" west, with an altitude of 295 meters. Its estimated population in 2020 was 25,433 inhabitants. It has an area of 2,011,060 km², according to data from the Brazilian Institute of Geography and Statistics (IBGE).

== History ==
It is located in the polygon of droughts on the right bank of the Itapicuru-açu river, in lands of the immeasurable sesmarias of Casa da Ponte, there were the farms “As Queimadas”, both owned by Isabel Maria Guedes de Brito, heir to these immense territories. The same territories of Isabel gave rise to the municipality of Queimadas.

The denomination of the farms derives from the fact that there are large fires in the caatinga to clear swiddens, a habit practiced by the Indians and followed by the colonizers. The frequent coivaras ended up forever marking the place that later gave its name to the village, the parish, the village, the city and the county.

But as soon as the settlement of the farms began, facilitated by the concessions that the owner made to those who wanted to settle there, as soon as the chapel appeared around which the camp was formed, the name Queimadas gained a complement, becoming known as Santo Antônio das Queimadas - becoming the patron saint of the city.

Later elevated to Vila Bela de Santo Antonio das Queimadas and today just Queimadas, it was emancipated on June 20, 1884, being yet another centenary city in the northeastern backlands of Bahia. The toponym was enriched with the name of the Saint who was part of the town's life at all stages of its history.

The invocation of Saint Anthony did not happen by chance, according to the legend that was transmitted from generation to generation with the strength of the faith of simple and gullible souls. They say that the image appeared, inexplicably, under a tree in the place where, one hundred and ninety-four years ago, the chapel was built. The farmer picked it up so many times that the image disappeared from its rich jacaranda niche and reappeared in the same place where they had first found it. The case was taken as a miracle and the news spread, dragging followers who started to revere the place of the apparition. There was no longer any doubt: Santo Antônio indicated that a church should be built there, which was done. And so, in the year of grace 1815, the works were completed, and on June 13 of the same year, Santo Antônio was enthroned and elevated to the status of patron saint of the nascent village.

A curious fact is that the same image, formerly a symbol of devotion, was tried and convicted in Água Fria for the crime of homicide, after an individual appeared dead in front of the Church. The little church built on the property of Isabel Maria Guedes de Brito still exists today in its original form, although, from time to time, attempts have been made to distort its primitive characteristics.

Queimadas is a city of enormous historical and cultural diversity, a resting place for military troops on their way to the city of Canudos, land of former colonels of the Old Republic (1889–1930). Queimadas is today a city of popular festivities and people who, through art, rescue the culture of the Brazilian, Northeastern, Bahian and Queimadas people.

== See also ==
- List of municipalities in Bahia
