= Preto River (Bahia, Grande River tributary) =

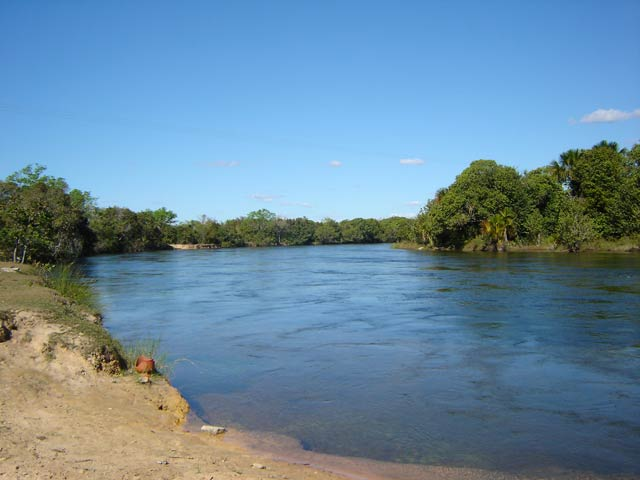

- Location within Brazil
- Native name: Rio Preto (Portuguese)

Location
- Country: Brazil

Physical characteristics
- Source
  - location: Bahia state
- Mouth: Rio Grande
  - coordinates: 11°21′09″S 43°50′14″W

Basin features
- River system: Rio Grande

The Preto River, a tributary of the Rio Grande, is a river of Bahia state in eastern Brazil.

The river basin includes part of the 707,079 hectares (1,747,230 acres) Serra Geral do Tocantins Ecological Station, a strictly protected conservation unit created in 2001 to preserve an area of cerrado.

== See also ==
- List of rivers of Bahia
