= Das Almas River (Bahia) =

- Location within Brazil
- Native name: Rio das Almas (Portuguese)

Location
- Country: Brazil

Physical characteristics
- Mouth
  - location: Atlantic Ocean: Cairu, Bahia
  - coordinates: 13.481349°S 39.065276°W

The Das Almas River (Portuguese: Rio das Alman), or Jequié River (Portuguese: Rio Jequié) is a river in the state of Bahia, Brazil. It empties into the Atlantic Ocean.

The Wenceslau Guimarães Ecological Station was created in 1997 to protect the headwaters of the Das Almas River.

== See also ==
- List of rivers of Bahia
