= Corrente River (Bahia) =

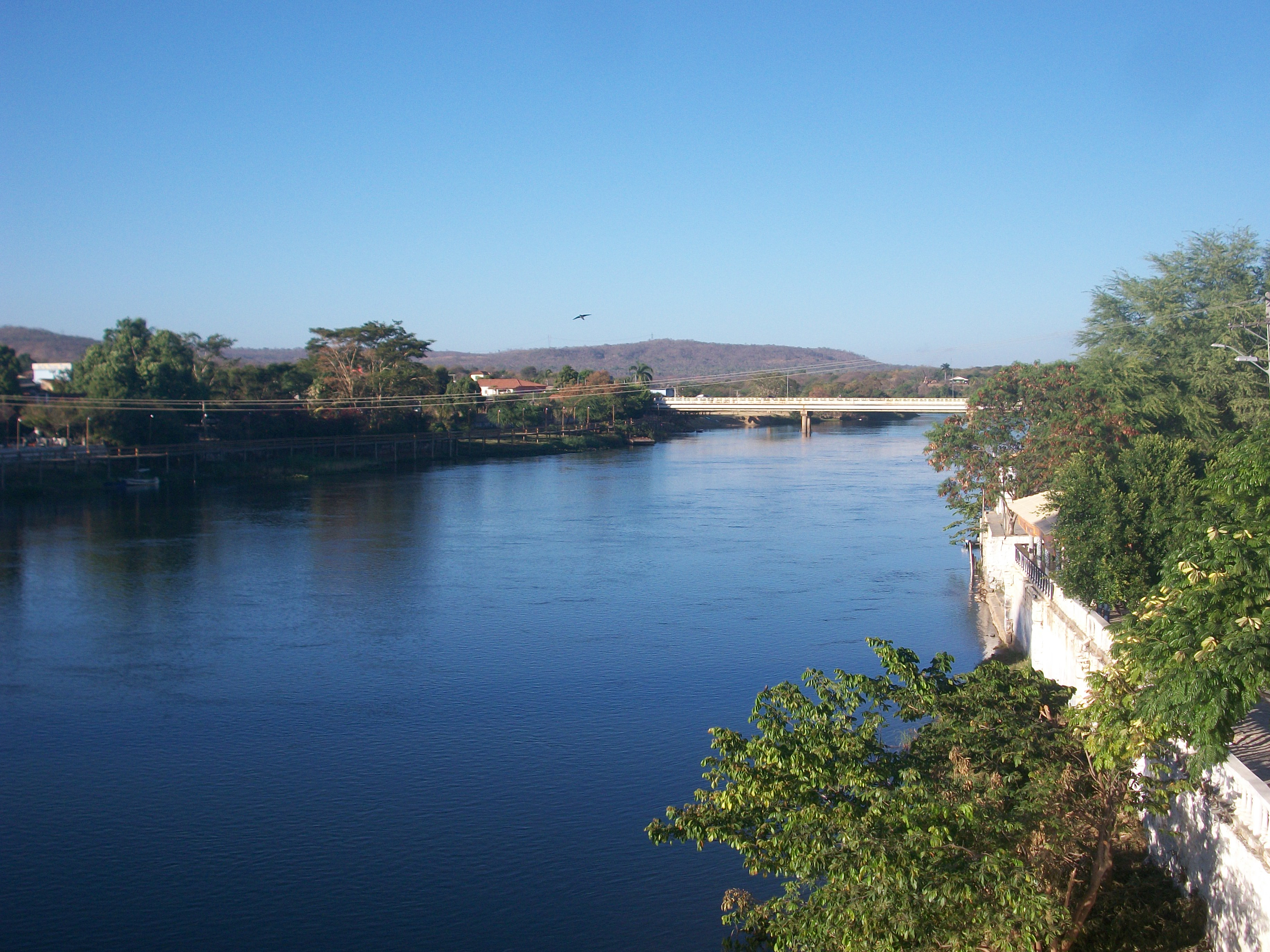

Location
- Country: Brazil

Physical characteristics
- Source
  - location: Bahia state
- Mouth: São Francisco River
  - coordinates: 13°8′S 43°28′W

The Corrente River is a river of Bahia state in eastern Brazil.

== See also ==
- List of rivers of Bahia
