= Cachoeira River (Bahia) =

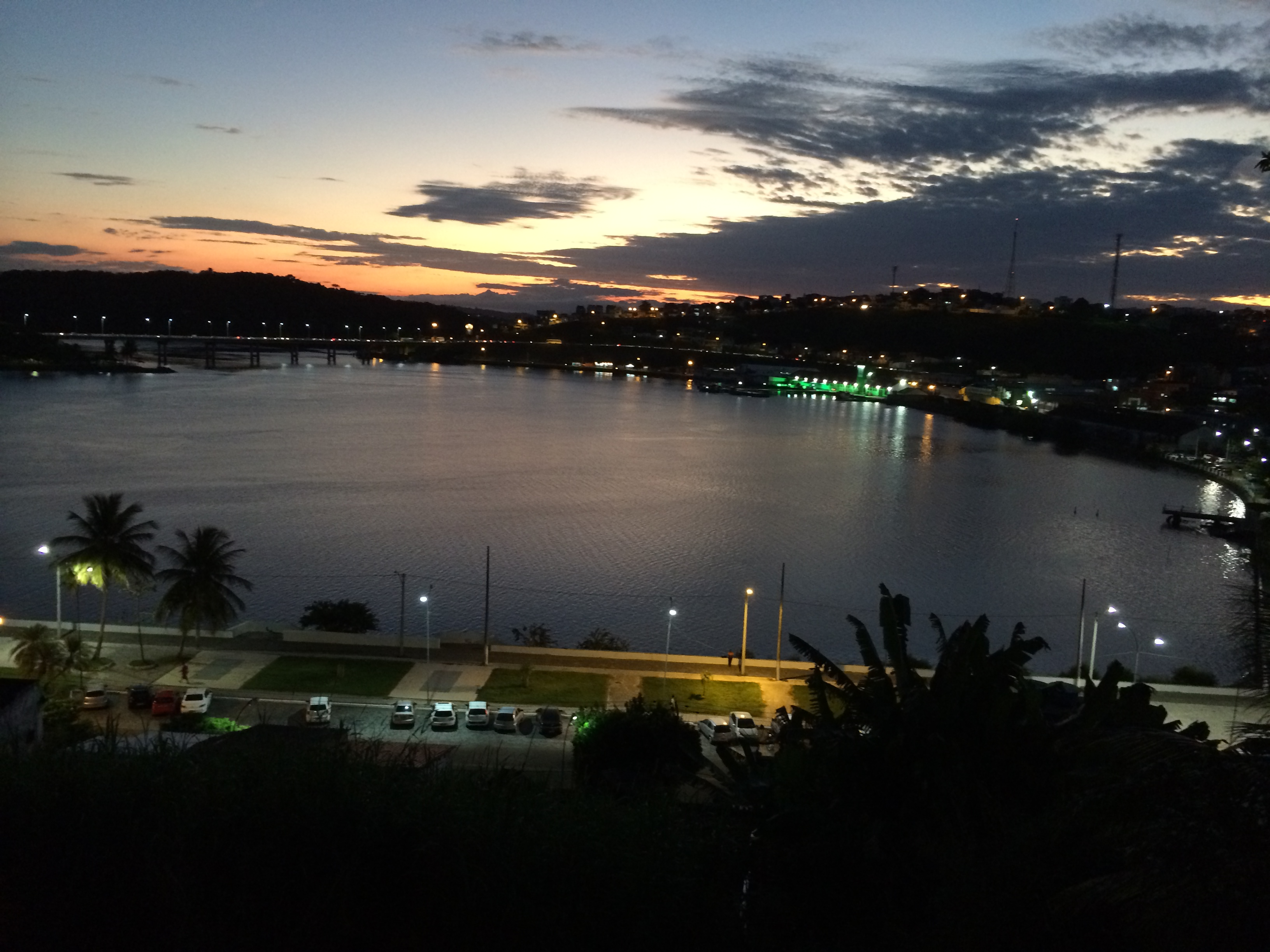

- Location within Brazil

Location
- Country: Brazil

Physical characteristics
- Source
  - location: Bahia state
- Mouth: Atlantic Ocean
  - coordinates: 14°49′S 39°3′W

The Cachoeira River is a river of Bahia state in eastern Brazil.

== See also ==
- List of rivers of Bahia
