= Rio Grande (Bahia) =

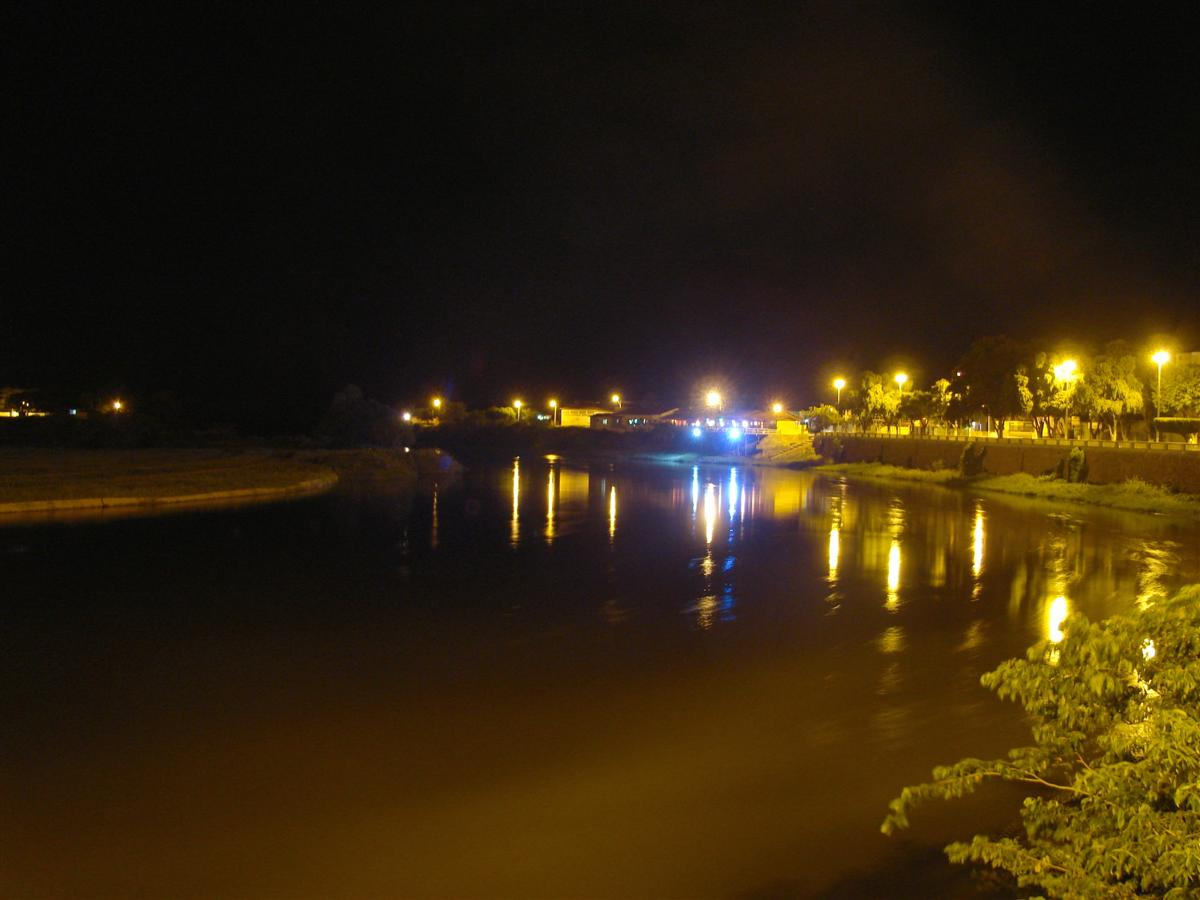
- View of the Rio Grande in Barreiras, Bahia

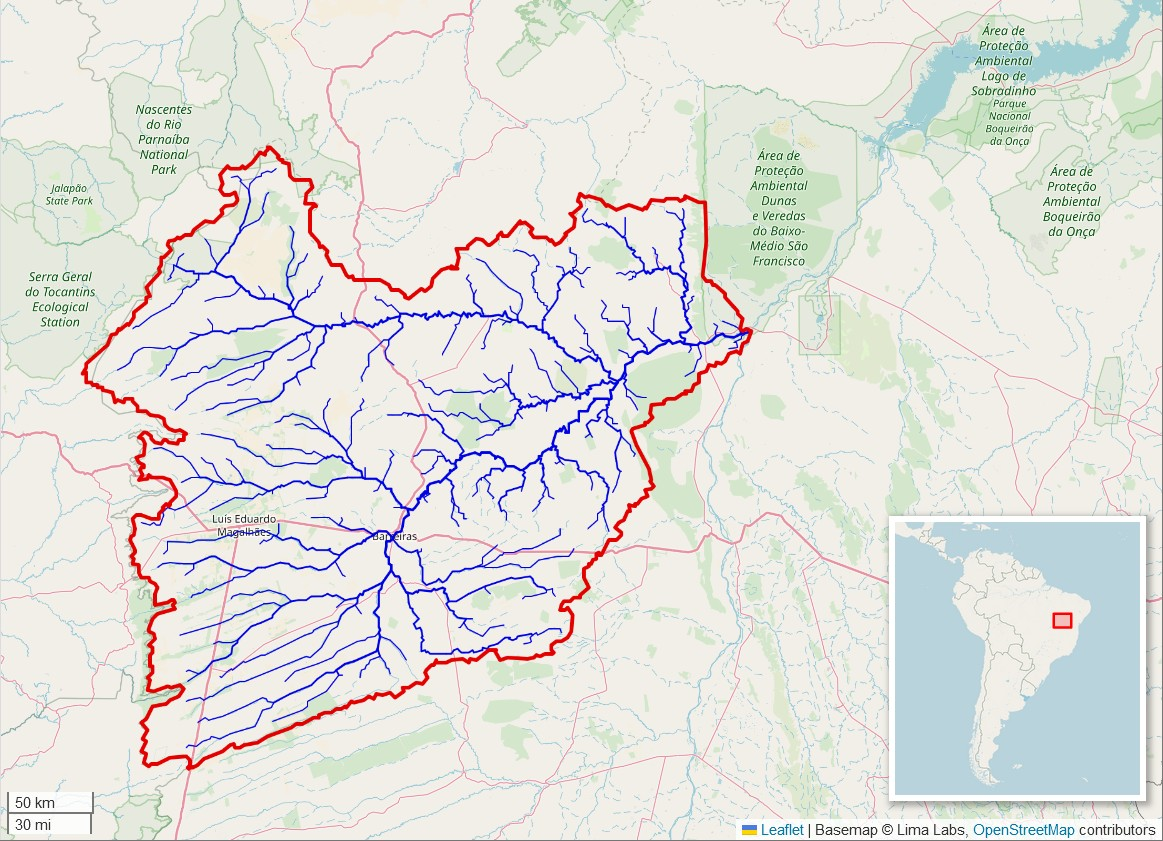
- Rio Grande watershed (Interactive map)

Location
- Country: Brazil

Physical characteristics
- Source
  - location: Bahia state
- Mouth: São Francisco River
  - coordinates: 11°5′S 43°9′W

Rio Grande (Portuguese for "great river") is a river of Bahia state in eastern Brazil. It is a tributary of the São Francisco River.

== See also ==
- List of rivers of Bahia
