= List of rivers of the Americas by coastline =

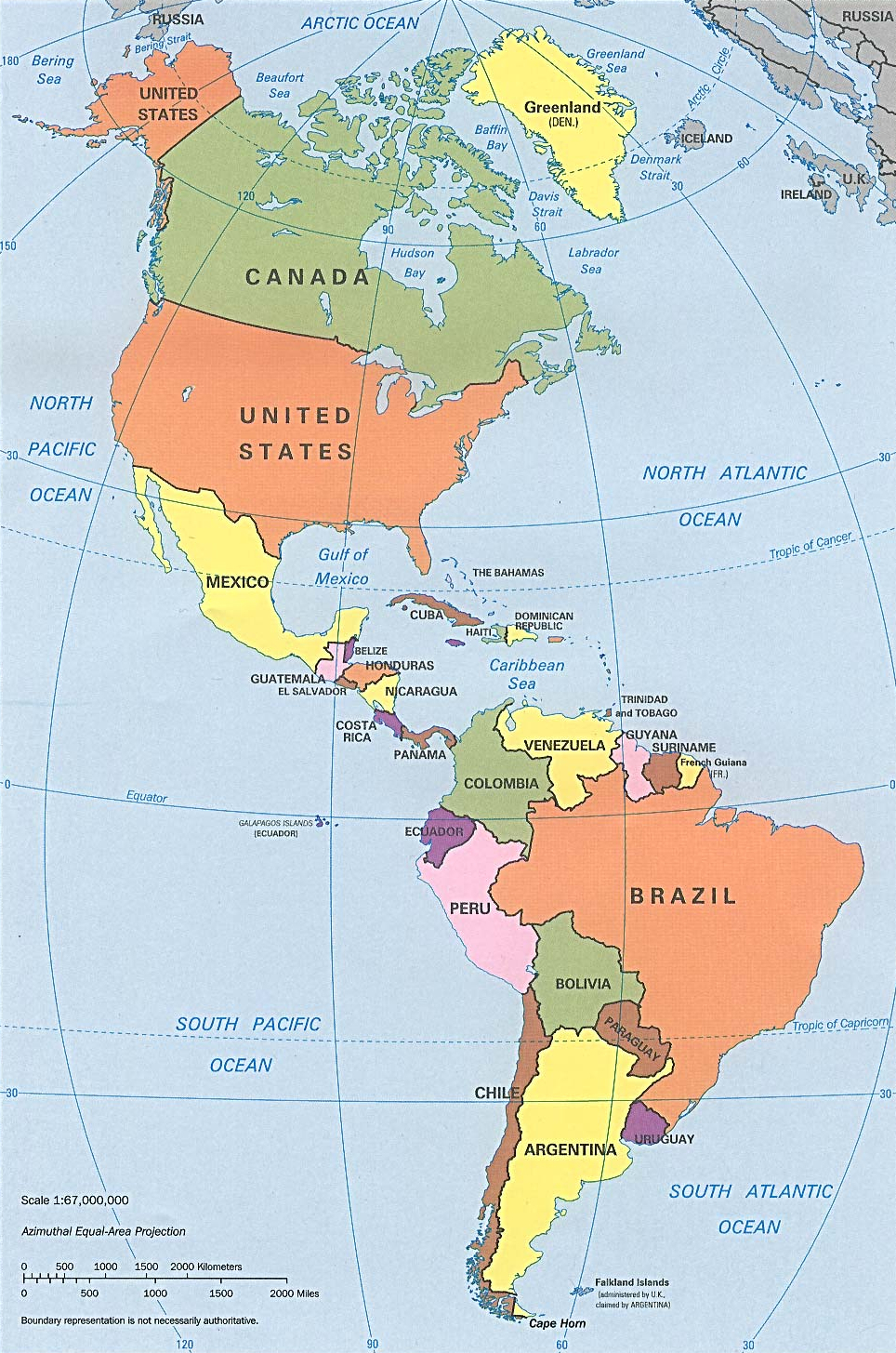
Americas

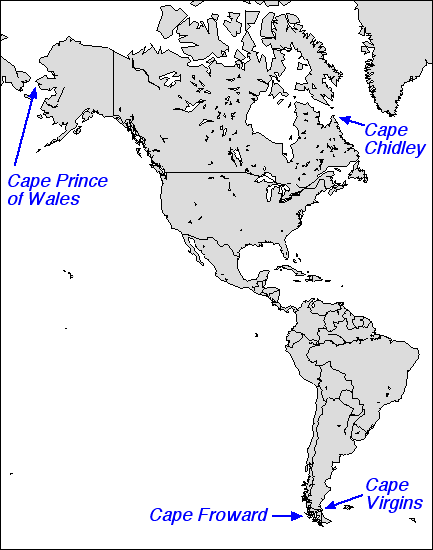
Capes in the Americas

This list of rivers of the Americas by coastline includes the major coastal rivers of the Americas arranged by country. A link to a map of rivers with known coordinates is listed at right. The ocean coasts are demarcated as follows:

- Arctic Ocean coast (including Hudson Bay) from Cape Prince of Wales east to Cape Chidley
- Atlantic Ocean coast from Cape Chidley south to Cape Virgins
- Pacific Ocean coast from Cape Prince of Wales south to Cape Virgins
- Endorheic basin coast (drainage basins not reaching oceans)

This is a counterpart to the primarily alphabetical List of rivers of the Americas and other lists of rivers of countries, although only rivers which reach the ocean are included here, not tributaries.

== Arctic Ocean coast ==
Arctic Ocean

In the Americas, only the United States, Canada, and Greenland have rivers on the Arctic Ocean coast. Greenland is surrounded by the Barents Sea (part of the Arctic Ocean), the Greenland Sea (often described as part of the Arctic Ocean), Baffin Bay to the west (marginal sea of the Arctic Ocean), the Labrador Sea to the south (part of the Arctic Ocean), and directly to the Arctic Ocean to the north. The following is a list of rivers flowing into the Arctic Ocean. The province and country where the mouth is located are included.

List of rivers flowing into the Arctic Ocean
| Name | State or Province (mouth) | Country (mouth) | Route to Arctic Ocean | coordinate (mouth) |
|---|---|---|---|---|
| Mackenzie | Northwest Territories | Canada | Beaufort Sea | 68°56′23″N 136°10′22″W |
| Chesterfield Inlet | Nunavut | Canada | Hudson Bay | 63°32′24″N 091°04′48″W |
| Dawson Inlet | Nunavut | Canada | Hudson Bay | 61°50′00″N 93°25′00″W |
| Maguse River | Nunavut | Canada | Hudson Bay | 61°17′N 094°05′W |
| Tha-anne River | Nunavut | Canada | Hudson Bay | 60°31′00″N 94°38′00″W |
| Thlewiaza River | Nunavut | Canada | Hudson Bay | 60°28′59″N 94°40′0″W |
| Nanook River | Nunavut | Canada | Hadley Bay, Viscount Melville Sound | 71°36′00″N 107°46′59″W |
| Caribou River | Manitoba | Canada | Hudson Bay | 59°19′30″N 94°44′07″W |
| Seal River | Manitoba | Canada | Hudson Bay | 59°4′19″N 94°47′56″W |
| North Knife River | Manitoba | Canada | Hudson Bay | 58°57′01″N 94°36′47″W |
| South Knife River | Manitoba | Canada | Hudson Bay | 58°53′55″N 94°35′56″W |
| Churchill River | Manitoba | Canada | Hudson Bay | 58°47′45″N 94°12′15″W |
| Nelson River | Manitoba | Canada | Hudson Bay | 57°5′5″N 92°30′8″W |
| Firth River | Alaska | US | Beaufort Sea | 69°33′00″N 139°30′00″W |
| Kongakut River | Alaska | US | Beaufort Sea | 69°46′35″N 141°42′16″W |
| Aichilik River | Alaska | US | Beaufort Sea | 69°50′24″N 141°07′34″W |
| Jago River | Alaska | US | direct | 70°06′34″N 143°18′23″W |
| Okpilak River | Alaska | US | direct | 70°04′40″N 144°03′09″W |
| Hulahula River | Alaska | US | direct | 70°03′54″N 144°04′57″W |
| Sadlerochit River | Alaska | US | Camden Bay, Beaufort Sea | 70°01′22″N 144°26′08″W |
| Canning River | Alaska | US | Camden Bay, Beaufort Sea | 70°04′42″N 145°33′56″W |
| Shaviovik River | Alaska | US | direct | 70°12′16″N 147°16′50″W |
| Kadleroshilik River | Alaska | US | Foggy Island Bay, Beaufort Sea | 70°12′26″N 147°36′27″W |
| Kuparuk River | Alaska | US | Beaufort Sea | 70°25′28″N 148°52′15″W |
| Colville River | Alaska | US | direct | 70°26′46″N 150°21′28″W |
| Fish Creek | Alaska | US | | |
| Ikpikpuk River | Alaska | US | Smith Bay, Beaufort Sea | 70°49′25″N 154°18′09″W |
| Topagoruk River | Alaska | US | Admiralty Bay | 70°45′24″N 155°55′35″W |
| Meade River | Alaska | US | Beaufort Sea | 70°54′12″N 155°57′27″W |
| Kuk River | Alaska | US | Chukchi Sea | 70°36′29″N 160°06′40″W |
| Utukok River | Alaska | US | Chukchi Sea | 70°02′49″N 162°27′26″W |
| Kokolik River | Alaska | US | Chukchi Sea | 69°46′15″N 162°59′48″W |
| Kukpowruk River | Alaska | US | Chukchi Sea | 69°36′57″N 163°01′06″W |
| Pitmegea River | Alaska | US | Chukchi Sea | 68°54′53″N 164°37′32″W |
| Kukpuk River | Alaska | US | Chukchi Sea | 68°24′57″N 166°22′37″W |
| Kivalina River | Alaska | US | Kivalina Lagoon | 67°49′03″N 164°40′46″W |
| Albany River | Ontario | Canada | James Bay | 52°17′00″N 81°30′59″W |
| Severn River | Ontario | Canada | Hudson Bay | 55°59′N 87°38′W |
| Horton River | Northwest Territories | Canada | | 69°56′01″N 126°48′10″W |
| Back River | Northwest Territories | Canada | | 67°16′00″N 95°15′00″W |
| Thomsen River | Northwest Territories | Canada | Castel Bay, Viscount Melville Sound | 73°59′41″N 119°43′27″W |
| Wolf River | Nunavut | Canada | Expedition Fjord, Strand Bay, Sverdrup Channel | 79°23′00″N 91°07′00″W |
| Børglum Elv | | Greenland | | 82°11′00″N 30°20′00″W |
| Minturn Elv | | Greenland | Baffin Bay | 78°48′07″N 69°17′47″W |

== Atlantic Ocean coast ==
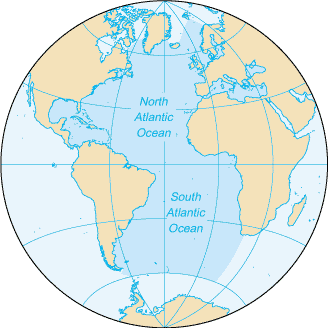
Area of the Atlantic Ocean

The Atlantic Ocean has irregular coasts indented by numerous bays, gulfs and seas. These include the Baltic Sea, Black Sea, Caribbean Sea, Davis Strait, Denmark Strait, part of the Drake Passage, Gulf of Mexico, Labrador Sea, Mediterranean Sea, North Sea, Norwegian Sea, almost all of the Scotia Sea, and other tributary water bodies. Including these marginal seas the coast line of the Atlantic measures 111,866 km (69,510 mi) compared to 135,663 km (84,297 mi) for the Pacific.

The rivers in the following sections flow into the Atlantic Ocean, unless indicated otherwise. The rivers of Cuba and several other countries flow into the Caribbean Sea which connects to the Atlantic Ocean. Some rivers also flow into the Gulf of Mexico before the water reaches the main Atlantic Ocean. A few of the major, notable rivers flowing into the Caribbean and Gulf of Mexico are included below. These lists contain rivers with Wikipedia articles and a few other well-documented rivers.

=== Argentina, Atlantic Ocean coast ===
Coastal rivers of Argentina with mouth on the Atlantic Ocean coast
| Name | Country (mouth) | Coordinate (mouth) |
|---|---|---|
| Río de la Plata | Argentina | 35°40′S 55°47′W |
| Paraná | Argentina, Uruguay | 34°0′5″S 58°23′37″W |
| Quequén Grande River | Argentina | 38°30′33″S 58°44′03″W |
| Sauce Grande River | Argentina | 38°59′34″S 61°05′47″W |
| Arroyo Napostá | Argentina | 38°47′31″S 62°14′18″W |
| Rio Sauce Chico | Argentina | 38°47′00″S 62°18′00″W |
| Colorado River | Argentina | 39°42′54.39″S 62°7′52.43″W |
| Río Negro | Argentina | 41°01′50″S 62°47′23″W |
| Chubut River | Argentina | 43°20′32″S 65°03′18″W |
| Deseado River | Argentina | 47°45′39″S 65°53′56″W |
| Santa Cruz River | Argentina | 50°08′S 68°21′W |
| Coig River | Argentina | 50°57′00″S 69°10′00″W |
| Gallegos River | Argentina | 51°35′40″S 68°58′30″W |
| Rio Grande | Argentina | 53°48′00″S 67°41′00″W |
| Fuego River | Argentina | 54°00′17.9″S 67°37′12.8″W |
| Rio Grande | Argentina | 53°47′21″S 67°40′56″W |

=== Bahamas, Caribbean Sea, Atlantic Ocean coast ===
While there are many tidal creeks in The Bahamas, the Goose River is the only river (24°21′N 78°06′W). Its mouth is on the Caribbean Sea.

=== Barbados, Caribbean Sea, Atlantic Ocean coast ===
The following rivers in Barbados flow to the Atlantic Ocean.

- Bruce Vale River, Saint Andrew Parish, 13°14′59″N 59°33′29″W
- Joes River, Saint Joseph Parish, 13°13′00″N 59°32′00″W
- Long Pond River, Saint Andrew Parish, 13°15′06″N 59°33′20″W

The following rivers in Barbados flow to the Caribbean Sea.

- Constitution River, Saint Michael Parish, 13°05′44″N 59°37′03″W
- Indian River, Saint Michael Parish, 13°06′38″N 59°37′35″W

=== Belize, Caribbean Sea, Atlantic Ocean coast ===
All coastal rivers in Belize drain to the Caribbean Sea before going into the Atlantic Ocean.

=== Brazil, Atlantic Ocean coast ===
Rivers of Brazil where the mouth is on the Atlantic Coast
| Name | State (mouth) | Coordinates |
|---|---|---|
| Amazon River | Amapá | 0°42′28″N 50°5′22″W |
| Araguari River | Amapá | 1.25°N 49.916667°W |
| Macari River | Amapá | 1°52′N 50°31′W |
| Flechal River | Amapá | 2°8′N 50°42′W |
| Calçoene River | Amapá | 2°30′25″N 50°49′15″W |
| São Francisco River | Bahia | 10°29′59″S 36°23′44″W |
| Mucuri River | Bahia | 18°05′37″S 39°32′49″W |
| Peruípe River | Bahia | 17°54′S 39°21′W |
| Caravelas River | Bahia | 17.743979°S 39.186784°W |
| Itanhaém River | Bahia | 17°32′S 39°12′W |
| Jucurucu River | Bahia | 17°23′S 39°12′W |
| Caraíva River | Bahia | 16°47′59″S 39°08′39″W |
| Frades River | Bahia | 16°41′22″S 39°06′17″W |
| Buranhém River | Bahia | 16°27′24″S 39°03′54″W |
| João de Tiba River | Bahia | 16°15′04″S 39°00′39″W |
| Jequitinhonha River | Bahia | 15°51′00″S 38°51′27″W |
| Pardo River | Bahia | 15°39′S 38°57′W |
| Una River | Bahia | 15°13′47″S 39°00′00″W |
| Almada River | Bahia | 14°46′31″S 39°03′06″W |
| Tijuípe River | Bahia | 14°25′S 39°1′W |
| Jequiriçá River | Bahia | 13°13′S 38°56′W |
| Pojuca River | Bahia | 12°35′50″S 38°01′49″W |
| Itapicuru River | Bahia | 11°47′S 37°32′W |
| Real River | Bahia | 11°27′S 37°21′W |
| Vaza-Barris River | Bahia | 11°10′17″S 37°09′49″W |
| Sergipe River | Sergipe | 10°57′40″S 37°02′0″W |
| Japaratuba River | Sergipe | 10°44′30″S 36°51′02″W |
| São Francisco River | Sergipe | 10°29′59″S 36°23′44″W |
| Coruripe River | Alagoas | 10°09′30″S 36°09′03″W |
| Jequiá River (Alagoas) | Alagoas | 10°02′57″S 36°01′51″W |
| São Miguel River | Alagoas | 9°51′S 35°54′W |
| Prataji River | Alagoas | 9°34′S 35°39′W |
| Meirim River | Alagoas | 9°32′51″S 35°37′07″W |
| Tatuamunha River | Alagoas | 9°14′S 35°21′W |
| Manguaba River | Alagoas | 9°9′S 35°18′W |
| Salgado River | Alagoas | 9°4′S 35°14′W |
| Mundaú River | Pernambuco | 8°54′S 35°9′W |
| Una River | Pernambuco | 8°51′40″S 35°07′48″W |
| Sirinhaém River | Pernambuco | 8°36′40″S 35°02′45″W |
| Ipojuca River | Pernambuco | 8°24′39″S 34°58′04″W |
| Jaboatão River | Pernambuco | 8°13′31″S 34°55′35″W |
| Goiana River | Pernambuco | 7°33′11″S 34°49′58″W |
| Guaju River | Pernambuco | 6°29′16″S 34°58′06″W |
| Gurupí River | Pará | 1°07′01″S 46°03′18″W |
| Parnaíba River | Piauí | 2°45′01″S 41°49′15″W |

=== Canada, Atlantic Ocean coast ===
Canadian coastal river basins flow towards either the Arctic Ocean, Atlantic Ocean, or Pacific Ocean. The major Canadian rivers with their mouth on the Atlantic Ocean coast are included in the list below. The Province where the mouth is located is also given.

- Bald Head River, Newfoundland and Labrador, 47°19′23″N 52°44′32″W
- Barrington River, Nova Scotia, 43°34′3.3″N 65°34′42.7″W
- LaHave River, Nova Scotia, 44°22′2.1″N 64°28′47.1″W
- Mersey River, Nova Scotia, 44°2′59.1″N 64°44′20.8″W
- Saint John, New Brunswick, Bay of Fundy45°16′N 66°4′W
- St. Lawrence River, Quebec, 49°30′N 64°30′W
- St. Mary's River, Nova Scotia, 45°6′19.4″N 61°57′54.7″W

=== Colombia, Caribbean Sea, Atlantic Ocean coast ===
Colombian rivers with their mouth on the Caribbean Sea, Atlantic Ocean coast include:

- Magdalena River, Colombia, Caribbean Sea, 11°7′0″N 74°51′0″W

=== Costa Rica, Atlantic Ocean coast ===
All Costa Rican drainage basins flow to either the Caribbean Sea or the Pacific Ocean.

=== Cuba, Caribbean Sea, Atlantic Ocean coast ===
All Cuban coastal rivers have their mouth on the Caribbean Sea, including the following major river:

- Cauto River, Caribbean Sea20°32′57″N 77°14′30″W

=== Dominican Republic, Caribbean Sea, Atlantic Ocean coast ===
The following rivers of the Dominican Republic have their mouth on the Atlantic Ocean:

- Dajabón River, 19°42′07″N 71°45′31″W
- Yaque del Norte River, 19°50′24″N 71°41′13″W

=== French Guiana, Atlantic Ocean coast ===
Rivers of French Guiana where the mouth is on the Atlantic Ocean coast include the following:

- Approuague, 4°41′01″N 51°57′41″W
- Counamama (near Iracoubo), 5°32′42″N 53°17′25″W
- Kourou, 5°9′10″N 52°37′45″W
- Mahury, 4°52′09″N 52°14′08″W
- Maroni, 5°44′45″N 53°58′06″W
- Mana, 5°43′44″N 53°50′17″W
- Oyapock, 04°14′08″N 51°36′53″W
- Rivière de Cayenne, 4°55′23″N 52°20′56″W
- Sinnamary, 5°26′14″N 52°59′47″W

=== Guyana, Atlantic Ocean coast ===
Rivers of Guyana where the mouth is on the Atlantic Ocean coast include the following:

- Abary River, 6°33′N 57°44′W
- Berbice River, 6°17′N 57°32′W
- Courantyne River, 5°57′N 57°06′W
- Demerara River, 6.8121°N 58.1701°W
- Essequibo River, 7°02′N 58°27′W
- Mahaica River, 6°43′N 57°55′W
- Mahaicony River, 6°34′N 57°48′W
- Moruka River, 7°40′08″N 58°46′55″W
- Pomeroon River, 7°37′N 58°45′W
- Waini River, 8°23′25″N 59°50′14″W

=== Haiti, Caribbean Sea, Atlantic Ocean coast ===
Coastal rivers of Haiti have their mouths on the Caribbean Sea, including:

- Artibonite River, Caribbean Sea, 19.25°N 72.783333°W

=== Honduras, Caribbean Sea, Atlantic Ocean coast ===
Coastal rivers of Honduras flow into either the Caribbean Sea or Pacific Ocean.

=== Mexico, Atlantic Ocean coast ===
Coastal rivers of Mexico include Pacific Ocean coastal rivers and the following river with its mouth on the Gulf of Mexico.

- Rio Grande, United States, Mexico, Gulf of Mexico, 25°57′22″N 97°8′43″W

=== Nicaragua, Caribbean Sea, Atlantic Ocean coast ===
Coastal rivers of Nicaragua with their mouth on the Caribbean Sea, Atlantic Ocean include:

- Coco River, 15°00′N 83°08′W
- Escondido River, 12°05′12″N 83°44′57″W
- Indio River, 10°56′31″N 83°43′11″W
- Kukalaya River, 13°39′08″N 83°37′11″W
- Kukra River, 11.9°N 83.816667°W
- Kurinwás River, 12°47′33″N 83°39′18″W
- Layasiksa River, 13°38′56″N 83°36′54″W
- Maíz River, 11°17′34″N 83°52′28″W
- Prinzapolka River, 13°24′21″N 83°34′02″W
- Punta Gorda River, 11°30′32″N 83°46′26″W
- Río Grande de Matagalpa, 12°54′N 83°32′W
- San Juan River, 10°56′23″N 83°41′54″W
- Ulang River, 14°27′00″N 83°14′00″W
- Wawa River, 14°13′38″N 83°34′43″W
- Wawasang River, 12°33′15″N 83°44′47″W

=== Panama, Caribbean Sea, Atlantic Ocean coast ===
Coastal rivers in Panama have their mouth on either the Caribbean Sea in the Atlantic or the Pacific Ocean. Some of the rivers with their mouth on the Caribbean Sea include:

- Chagres River (Panama Canal), 9°19′N 80°0′W
- Calovebora River, 8.78794°N 81.212462°W
- Sixaola River, 9°34′20″N 82°33′54″W

=== Suriname, Atlantic Ocean coast ===
Coastal rivers of Suriname where the mouth is on the Atlantic Ocean coast include:

- Coppename River, 5°48′00″N 55°55′00″W
- Courantyne River, 5°57′18″N 57°04′46″W
- Maroni River, 5°44′45″N 53°58′06″W
- Nickerie River, 5°57′28″N 56°59′21″W
- Saramacca River, 5°51′00″N 55°53′00″W
- Suriname River, 5°55′37″N 55°09′37″W

=== United States, Atlantic Ocean coast ===
The U.S. coastal rivers where the mouth is on the Atlantic Ocean coast include:

U.S. Atlantic Ocean coastal rivers
| Name | State (mouth) | route to Atlantic | Coordinates (mouth) |
|---|---|---|---|
| Connecticut River | Connecticut | Long Island Sound | 41°16′20″N 72°20′03″W |
| Delaware River | Delaware | Delaware Bay | 39°25′13″N 75°31′11″W |
| St. Marys River | Florida | | 30°43′23″N 81°29′41″W |
| Nassau River | Florida | | 30°30′48″N 81°26′20″W |
| Fort George River | Florida | | 30.4394064°N 81.4242539°W |
| St. Johns River | Florida | | 30°24′05″N 81°24′3″W |
| Matanzas River | Florida | | 29°54′50″N 81°17′01″W |
| Halifax River | Florida | | 29°04′25″N 80°55′22″W |
| Indian River North | Florida | | 27.83°N 80.45°W |
| Indian River | Florida | | 27°50′N 80°27′W |
| St. Lucie River | Florida | | 27°10′10″N 80°11′09″W |
| Loxahatchee River | Florida | | 26°56′57.9″N 80°6′25.8″W |
| Hillsboro River | Florida | | 27°56′31″N 82°27′29″W |
| Stranahan River | Florida | | 26.1020314°N 80.1192112°W |
| Oleta River | Florida | | 25°56′N 80°08′W |
| Little River | Florida | Biscayne Bay | 25°51′03″N 80°11′27″W |
| Miami River | Florida | | 25°46′14″N 80°11′06″W |
| Savannah River | Georgia, South Carolina | | 32°02′16″N 80°51′00″W |
| Bull River | Georgia | | 31°58′48″N 80°55′41″W |
| Halfmoon River | Georgia | | 31.95966°N 80.94205°W |
| Wilmington River | Georgia | | 31°55′16″N 80°56′15″W |
| Odingsell River | Georgia | | 31°51′34″N 81°00′24″W |
| Ogeechee | Georgia | | 31°50′1″N 81°1′39″W |
| Bear River | Georgia | | 31°43′35″N 81°09′08″W |
| Medway River | Georgia | St. Catherines Sound | 31°43′00″N 81°10′38″W |
| North Newport River | Georgia | | 31°41′50″N 81°10′57″W |
| South Newport River | Georgia | | 31°33′17″N 81°11′40″W |
| Sapelo River | Georgia | | 31°32′11″N 81°16′37″W |
| Mud River | Georgia | | 31°32′07″N 81°14′31″W |
| Duplin River | Georgia | | 31°24′52″N 81°18′00″W |
| North River | Georgia | | 31°24′05″N 81°20′45″W |
| South River | Georgia | | 31°22′02″N 81°18′35″W |
| Altamaha River | Georgia | | 31°18′57″N 81°17′5″W |
| Hampton River | Georgia | | 31°12′57″N 81°18′21″W |
| Frederica River | Georgia | | 31°12′10″N 81°24′07″W |
| Mackay River | Georgia | | 31°09′26″N 81°25′48″W |
| Brunswick River | Georgia | | 31°07′13″N 81°25′35″W |
| Little Satilla River | Georgia | | 31°02′12″N 81°27′07″W |
| Satilla River | Georgia | | 30°59′1″N 81°27′29″W |
| Cumberland River | Georgia | | 30°53′32″N 81°30′21″W |
| St. Marys River | Georgia | | 30°43′23″N 81°29′41″W |
| Mississippi River | Louisiana | Gulf of Mexico | 29°09′04″N 89°15′12″W |
| Kennebec River | Maine | Gulf of Maine | 43°44′06″N 69°46′26″W |
| Piscataqua River | Maine | Gulf of Main/ Portsmouth Harbor | 43°3′22″N 70°42′11″W |
| Mousam River | Maine | | 43°20′40″N 70°30′54″W |
| Potomac River | Maryland, Virginia | Chesapeake Bay | 37°59′57″N 76°14′59″W |
| Susquehanna River | Maryland | Chesapeake Bay | 39°32′35″N 76°04′32″W |
| Hudson River | New York, New Jersey | Upper New York Bay | 40°41′48″N 74°01′42″W |
| Cape Fear River | North Carolina | | 33°53′08″N 078°00′46″W |
| North Landing River | North Carolina | Chesapeak Bay | 36°35′43″N 76°03′35″W |
| Pamlico River | North Carolina | Pamlico Sound | 35°19′6″N 76°25′58″W |
| Little River | South Carolina | | 33°50′45″N 78°32′49″W |
| Pee Dee River | South Carolina | Winyah Bay | 34°43′16″N 79°52′54″W |
| Santee River | South Carolina | | 33°07′48.96″N 79°15′31.73″W |
| Wando River | South Carolina | Charleston Harbor | 32°48′58″N 79°54′40″W |
| Cooper River | South Carolina | | 32°45′43″N 79°54′14″W |
| Ashley River | South Carolina | | 32°45′46″N 79°55′44″W |
| Stono River | South Carolina | | 32°38′13″N 80°00′54″W |
| Kiawah River | South Carolina | | 32°38′21″N 80°01′15″W |
| Edisto River | South Carolina | | 32°39′16″N 80°23′17″W |
| Ashepoo River | South Carolina | | 32°29′25″N 80°25′25″W |
| Combahee River | South Carolina | | 32°30′31″N 80°30′34″W |
| Coosaw River | South Carolina | | 32°29′01″N 80°28′29″W |
| Morgan River (Gut) | South Carolina | | 32°27′10″N 80°28′22″W |
| Story River (Gut) | South Carolina | | 32°19′59″N 80°31′01″W |
| Beaufort River | South Carolina | | 32°16′22″N 80°39′32″W |
| Broad River | South Carolina | | 32°17′41″N 80°42′17″W |
| May River | South Carolina | | 32.1971497°N 80.7895529°W |
| New River | South Carolina | | 32.0732667°N 80.8706658°W |
| Wright River | South Carolina | | 32.0496565°N 80.9076109°W |
| Cockle Creek | Virginia | North of Chesapeake Bay | 37°54′54″N 75°26′39″W |
| Machipongo River | Virginia | North of Chesapeake Bay | 37°33′17″N 75°47′54″W |

=== Uruguay, Atlantic Ocean coast ===
Coastal rivers of Uruguay where the mouth is on the Atlantic Ocean coast include:

- Chuí Stream, Uruguay and Brazil, 33°44′37″S 53°22′09″W
- Río de la Plata, Uruguay, 35°40′S 55°47′W
- Uruguay River, Uruguay and Argentina, 34°12′S 58°18′W

=== Venezuela, Atlantic Ocean coast ===
Coastal rivers of Venezuela have their mouth on either the Atlantic Ocean or the Caribbean Sea. The Orinoco River flows into the Delta Amacuro at its mouth. The Delta empties into the Gulf of Paría and the Atlantic Ocean. Venezuelan rivers with their mouth on the Atlantic Ocean coast include:

- Orinoco River, Venezuela and Colombia, 8°37′N 62°15′W
- Tocuyo River, 11°03′29″N 68°20′16″W
- Unare River, 10°05′20″N 65°11′12″W

== Pacific Ocean coast ==
Coastal rivers in the following sections by country have their mouth on the Pacific Ocean coast.

=== Canada, Pacific Ocean coast ===
Canadian rivers flowing into the Pacific Ocean include the following:

- Fraser River, British Columbia, 49°10′40″N 123°12′45″W
- Skeena River, British Columbia, 54°8′15″N 130°5′40″W

=== Chile, Pacific Ocean coast ===
The coastal rivers (Río) in Chile that have their mouth on the Pacific Ocean include:

- Aconcagua River, 32°54′54″S 71°30′30″W
- Bío-Bío River, 36°48′50″S 73°10′14″W
- Cautín River, 38.7533°S 72.9806°W
- Elqui River, 29°53′40″S 71°16′30″W
- Itata River, 36°23′04″S 72°52′07″W
- Loa River, 21°25′48″S 70°03′27″W
- Maipo River, 33°36′40″S 71°37′50″W
- Maule River, 35°19′00″S 72°24′30″W
- Maullín River, 41°35′49″S 73°39′31″W
- Palena River, 43°46′04″S 72°58′33″W
- Reñihue River, 42°26′30″S 72°46′34″W
- Río Bueno River, 40°14′41″S 73°42′50″W
- Toltén River, 39°15′04″S 73°13′24″W
- Valdivia River, 39°52′44″S 73°23′05″W
- Yelcho River, 42°57′22″S 72°45′03″W

=== Colombia, Pacific Ocean Coast ===
map of rivers in Colombia

Coastal rivers in Colombia flow into the Pacific Ocean or Caribbean Sea. Rivers flowing into the Pacific Ocean include the following:

- Anchicayá River, 3°32′00″N 76°52′03″W
- Baudó River, 4.96759°N 77.333961°W
- Dagua River, 3°51′41″N 77°03′55″W
- Guapi River, 2°38′33″N 77°54′41″W
- Iscuandé River, 2.619951°N 78.065831°W
- Mira River (Colombia and Ecuador), 1°36′00″N 79°01′00″W
- Naya River, 3°18′30″N 77°29′11″W
- Patía River, 2°15′36″N 78°40′47″W
- Tapaje River, 2°38′42″N 78°06′51″W
- San Juan River, 4°02′42″N 77°26′29″W
- San Juan de Micay River, 3.197401°N 77.508713°W
- Sanquianga River, 2°39′00″N 78°19′00″W
- Yurumanguí River, 3°24′49″N 77°21′26″W

=== Costa Rica, Pacific Ocean Coast ===
- Abangares River, 10°08′37″N 85°04′37″W
- Aranjuez River, 9°59′09″N 84°49′07″W
- Barranca River, 9°57′32″N 84°44′15″W
- Coto Colorado River, 8°32′55″N 83°08′20″W
- Río Ceibo, 9°06′13″N 83°23′07″W
- Chacuaco River
- Claro River (Costa Rica), 8°27′55″N 83°35′30″W
- Colón River
- Conte River, 8°37′29″N 83°25′39″W
- Diamante River (Costa Rica)
- Guacimal River, 10°01′32″N 84°53′57″W
- Jaba River (Costa Rica), 8°53′15″N 83°01′47″W
- Jesús María River, 9°51′49″N 84°41′50″W
- Lagarto River, 10°03′23″N 84°56′30″W
- Limón River (Costa Rica)
- Naranjo River (Costa Rica), 10°47′46″N 85°40′48″W
- Nosara River, 9°57′59″N 85°40′38″W
- La Palma River, 10°10′00″N 85°05′00″W
- Negro River (Costa Rica)
- Pirris River, 9°29′31″N 84°19′59″W
- Rincón River, 8°41′14″N 83°28′44″W
- Riyito River (Costa Rica)
- Savegre River, 9°20′48″N 84°01′53″W
- Sierpe River, 8°49′N 83°34′W
- Síngrí River, 8°59′05″N 83°07′03″W
- Tamarindo River, Costa Rica, 10°18′26″N 85°50′25″W
- Tárcoles River, 9°47′11″N 84°38′28″W
- Tempisque River, Gulf of Nicoya, 10°9′20″N 85°13′12″W
- Térraba River, 9°01′56″N 83°37′36″W
- Tigre River (Costa Rica), 8°34′03″N 83°19′36″W
- Volcán River (Costa Rica), 9°07′48″N 83°24′47″W

=== Ecuador, Pacific Ocean Coast ===
- Arenillas River, 3°24′40″S 80°01′44″W
- Balao River, 2°52′47″S 79°50′45″W
- Cañar River, 2°39′28″S 79°45′57″W
- Cayapas River, 1°13′50″N 79°02′43″W
- Coaque River, 0°01′00″N 80°06′00″W
- Chone River, 0°35′14″S 080°25′07″W
- Cojimies River, 0°15′43″N 79°56′37″W
- Esmeraldas River, 0°54′14″N 79°39′27″W
- Guayas River, Gulf of Guayaquil, 2°39′05″S 79°54′33″W
- Jama River, 0°09′49″S 80°15′59″W
- Jipijapa River, 1°21′05″S 80°44′04″W
- Jubones River, 3°10′18″S 79°55′36″W
- Mira River (Ecuador and Colombia border), 1°36′00″N 79°01′00″W
- Muisne River, 0°37′42″N 80°02′31″W
- Portoviejo River, 0°47′58″S 80°31′22″W
- Zarumilla River (Peru and Ecuador border), 3°26′27″S 80°13′19″W

=== El Salvador, Pacific Ocean Coast ===
- Banderas River, 13°32′N 89°43′W
- Cara Sucia River, 13°45′37″N 90°02′10″W
- Comalapa River, 13°25′00″N 89°10′00″W
- Copinula River, 13°37′57″N 89°50′36″W
- Goascorán River, 13°24′38″N 87°49′08″W
- Río Grande de San Miguel, 13°14′00″N 88°22′00″W
- El Guayabo River, 13°16′00″N 88°50′01″W
- Jalponga River, 13°22′00″N 88°57′00″W
- Jiboa River, 13°21′32″N 89°02′16″W
- Lempa River, 13°15′17″N 88°49′38″W
- El Molino River, 13°15′47″N 88°27′00″W
- Paz River, 13°46′16″N 90°10′57″W
- El Potrero River,
- Pululuya River, 13°33′N 89°42′W
- Sensunapan River, 13°35′54″N 89°50′15″W
- Sirama River, 13°27′34″N 87°47′52″W

=== Guatemala, Pacific Ocean Coast ===
The coastal rivers in Guatemala with their mouth on the Pacific Ocean coast include:

- Acomé River, 13°55′02″N 91°05′18″W
- Achiguate River, 13°54′55″N 90°54′29″W
- Coyolate River, 13°57′14″N 91°18′41″W
- Icán River, 14°07′30″N 91°39′55″W
- Lempa River, 13°15′17″N 88°49′38″W
- Los Esclavos River, 13°50′20″N 90°19′46″W
- Madre Vieja River, 14°00′14″N 91°25′49″W
- María Linda River, 13°56′32″N 90°42′31″W
- Nahualate River, 14°02′45″N 91°32′18″W
- Naranjo River, 14°30′31″N 92°11′07″W
- Ocosito River, 14°26′09″N 92°05′37″W
- Paso Hondo River, 14°43′06″N 92°05′50″W
- Paz River, 13°46′16″N 90°10′57″W
- Samalá River, 14°11′31″N 91°47′08″W
- Suchiate River (Guatemala and Mexico), 14°31′53″N 92°13′41″W

=== Honduras, Pacific Ocean Coast ===
- Choluteca River, 13°05′29″N 87°22′24″W
- Goascorán River, 13°24′38″N 87°49′08″W
- Lempa River, 13°15′17″N 88°49′38″W
- Nacaome River, 13°25′09″N 87°35′25″W
- Río Negro, 13°02′00″N 87°08′00″W

=== Mexico, Pacific Ocean Coast ===
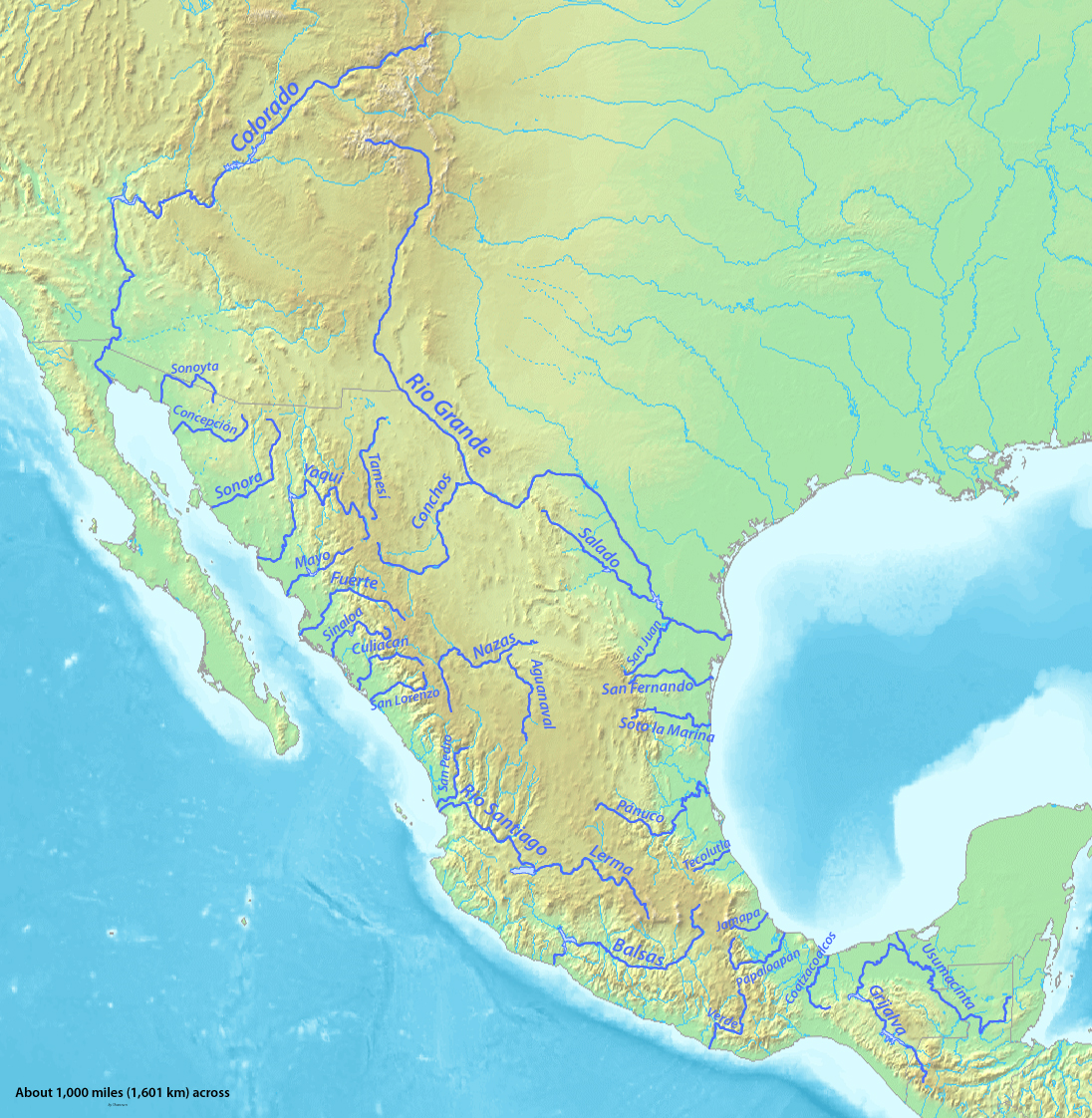
Major rivers in Mexico

Rivers of Mexico that have their mouth on the Pacific Ocean coast include the following. The river's name, as well as Mexican State and coordinates where the mouth of the river is located are listed where known.

Mexican Pacific Ocean coastal rivers
| Name | State (mouth) | Coordinates |
|---|---|---|
| Acaponeta River | Nayarit | 22°22′36″N 105°38′11″W |
| Ameca River | Jalisco | 20°40′21″N 105°16′52″W |
| Armería River | Colima | 18°52′55″N 103°57′07″W |
| Atoyac River | Guerrero | 17°56′24″N 102°08′13″W |
| Balsas River | Michoacán | 17°56′22″N 102°08′14″W |
| Baluarte River | Sinaloa | 22°50′27″N 106°01′57″W |
| Chacala River | Mexico | 19°09′02″N 104°35′20″W |
| Coalcomán River | Michoacán | 18°14′06″N 103°14′21″W |
| Colorado River | Baja California | 31°54′00″N 114°57′03″W |
| Colotepec River | Oaxaca | 15°48′34″N 97°01′27″W |
| Concepción River | Chiapas | 15°19′56″N 92°31′46″W |
| Copalita River | Oaxaca | 15°47′12″N 96°03′00″W |
| Culiacán River | Sinaloa | 24°29′32″N 107°43′55″W |
| Del Rosario River | Baja California | 32°20′00″N 117°03′00″W |
| Fuerte River | Sinaloa | 25°48′N 109°25′W |
| Mátape River | Sonora | 28°17′00″N 110°41′00″W |
| Mayo River | Sonora | 26°44′08″N 109°48′01″W |
| Ometepec River | Guerrero | 16°32′57″N 98°35′02″W |
| Papagayo River | Guerrero | 16°41′05″N 99°36′38″W |
| Piaxtla River | Sinaloa | 23°42′18″N 106°48′16″W |
| Presidio River | Sinaloa | 23°05′39″N 106°17′27″W |
| Purificación River | Jalisco | 19°18′07″N 104°53′52″W |
| Río Grande de Santiago | Nayarit | 21°38′00″N 105°26′43″W |
| Río Santa Rosalía | Baja California Sur | 26°54′N 111°59′W |
| Río Verde | Oaxaca | 16°25′23″N 94°52′56″W |
| San Antonio River | Chiapas | 14°48′12″N 92°13′06″W |
| San Lorenzo River | Sonora | 28°24′52″N 110°14′13″W |
| San Pedro Mezquital River | Nayarit | 21°56′22″N 105°21′01″W |
| San Vicente River | Baja California | 31°15′46″N 116°22′41″W |
| Sinaloa River | Sinaloa | 25°17′00″N 108°29′39″W |
| Sonora River | Sonora | 28°51′12″N 111°59′27″W |
| Sonoyta River | Sonora | 31°16′07″N 113°19′07″W |
| Suchiate River | Chiapas | 14°31′56″N 92°13′44″W |
| Teacapan Estuary | Sinaloa | 22°32′50″N 105°45′00″W |
| Tehuantepec River | Oaxaca | 16°11′16″N 95°08′45″W |
| Tomatlán River | Jalisco | 19°50′30″N 105°22′20″W |
| Tijuana River | Baja California | 32°33′06″N 117°07′38″W |
| Tuxpan River | Jalisco | 19°15′48″N 103°30′25″W |
| Yaqui River | Sonora | 27°40′02″N 110°36′43″W |

=== Nicaragua, Pacific Ocean Coast ===
- Río Brito, 11°20′39″N 85°58′45″W
- Rio Casares
- Río Escalante, Nicaragua, 11°31′09″N 86°10′20″W
- Estero Real, Chinandega, 12°55′14″N 87°21′47″W
- Río Negro, 13°02′00″N 87°08′00″W
- Río el Tamarindo, León, 12°12′47″N 86°45′46″W
- Río Tecolapa, Nicaragua, 11°43′16″N 86°26′29″W

=== Panama, Pacific Ocean Coast ===
The mouth of the following rivers in Panama are at the Pacific Ocean:

- Rio Anton, 8°18′04″N 80°15′46″W
- Bahia de Parita, 8°21′32″N 80°27′07″W
- Rio Cabra, 9°01′16″N 79°21′08″W
- Rio Caimito, 8°52′33″N 79°42′13″W
- Rio Cate, 7°43′09″N 81°14′51″W
- Rio Chame, 8°33′38″N 79°50′22″W
- Rio Chepo (Bayano River), 8°59′53″N 79°06′49″W
- Rio Chiriquí Viejo, 8°19′39″N 82°42′07″W
- Rio Chorcha, 8°17′24″N 82°17′10″W
- Rio Colorado, 8°18′45″N 82°46′03″W
- Rio Congo, 8°24′58″N 78°22′08″W
- Rio Corotú, 8°45′22″N 78°42′49″W
- Rio Duablo, 8°19′47″N 82°41′14″W
- Estero de Ajo, 8°20′27″N 82°08′51″W
- Rio Farallon, 8°21′00″N 80°08′37″W
- Rio Fonseca, 8°12′27″N 82°00′15″W
- Rio Grande, 9°01′N 79°37′W
- Rio Guanábano, 8°14′37″N 82°52′23″W
- Rio Jaqué, 7°30′00″N 78°03′00″W
- Rio La Villa, 7°59′47″N 80°23′15″W
- Las Vueltas
- Rio Lovaina, 7°56′37″N 81°36′58″W
- Rio Mariato, 7°37′02″N 80°59′13″W
- Rio Pacora, 9°01′18″N 79°16′47″W
- Rio Palo Blanco, 8°17′56″N 82°48′33″W
- Palo Seco, 7°36′30″N 80°58′34″W
- Rio Pavo, 7°21′30″N 80°54′00″W
- Rio Platanal, 8°19′06″N 78°11′19″W
- Puerto Pocrí (tidal creek), 7°42′00″N 80°07′00″W
- Rio Rabo de Puerco, 8°16′36″N 82°51′24″W
- Rio Sabanas, 8°25′05″N 78°05′17″W
- Rio Sambú, 8°04′37″N 78°18′08″W
- Rio San Bártolo, 8°17′02″N 82°50′51″W
- Rio San Pablo, 7°51′13″N 81°11′01″W
- Rio San Felix, 8°09′51″N 81°50′39″W
- Rio San Juan, 8°11′52″N 81°58′05″W
- Rio San Pedro, 8°49′31″N 81°32′39″W
- Rio Santa Maria, 8°05′21″N 80°29′07″W
- Rio Santiago, 8°10′52″N 81°45′40″W
- Rio Suay, 7°44′52″N 81°02′23″W
- Rio Tabasara, 8°01′39″N 81°41′51″W
- Rio Tuira, 8°19′10″N 78°18′31″W
- Rio Varadero, 7°17′13″N 80°55′27″W

=== Peru, Pacific Ocean Coast ===
The following coastal rivers in Peru have their mouth on the Pacific Ocean Coast:

- Acarí River, 15°39′34″S 74°38′33″W
- Atico, 16°03′16″S 73°37′04″W
- Cañete River, 13°07′46″S 76°24′06″W
- Caplina River, 18°14′00″S 70°33′00″W
- Caravelí River, 16°03′40″S 73°16′25″W
- Casma River, 9°26′58″S 78°22′57″W
- Chamán River, 7°12′15″S 79°39′58″W
- Chancay River (Lambayeque), 11°36′53″S 77°15′00″W
- Chancay River (Huaral), 11°36′40″S 77°14′46″W
- Chao River, 8°36′01″S 78°42′58″W
- Chaparra River, 15°55′18″S 74°07′21″W
- Chicama River, 7°56′21″S 79°16′59″W
- Chillón River, 11°56′24″S 77°08′19″W
- Chira River, 4°54′S 81°08′W
- Colca River, 16°37′52″S 72°45′51″W
- Culebras River, 9°56′14″S 78°13′32″W
- Fortaleza River, 10°38′54″S 77°51′39″W
- Grande River (Rio Nazca), 14°59′43″S 75°27′16″W
- Huaura River, 11°05′05″S 77°37′43″W
- Huarmey River, 10°05′40″S 78°10′00″W
- Ica River, 14°52′15″S 75°33′43″W
- Rio Indio Muerto or Chala, 15°48′00″S 74°14′00″W
- Jequetepeque River, 7°19′56″S 79°35′29″W
- Lacramarca River, 8°53′12″S 78°18′57″W
- Rio Locumba, 17°55′03″S 70°57′53″W
- Lurín River, 12°16′30″S 76°54′13″W
- Mala River, 12°40′27″S 76°39′26″W
- Moche River, 8°09′40″S 79°02′11″W
- Motupe River, 06°31′27″S 080°07′16″W
- Nepeña River, 9°13′08″S 78°22′06″W
- Ocoña River, 16°27′07″S 73°06′43″W
- Olmos River, 6°11′16″S 79°55′54″W
- Omas River, 12°45′17″S 76°29′25″W
- Osmore River or Moquegua or Ilo, 17°43′0″S 71°20′0″W
- Pativilca River, 10°44′15″S 77°47′32″W
- Pisco River, 13°40′36″S 76°12′52″W
- Piura River, 5°46′20″S 80°52′07″W
- Rímac River, 11°56′50″S 76°42′29″W
- Sama River, 18°09′50″S 70°40′26″W
- Rio San Juan
- Santa River, 8°57′57″S 78°38′05″W
- Supe River, 10°50′50″S 77°42′45″W
- Tambo River
- Quebrada Topara, 13°19′23″S 76°14′33″W
- Tumbes River, 3°30′S 80°27′W
- Virú River, 8°29′05″S 78°52′33″W
- Vitor River, 16°37′13″S 72°18′13″W
- Yauca River, 15°41′52″S 74°32′16″W
- Zaña River, 7°05′10″S 79°43′05″W
- Zarumilla River, 3.4408°S 80.2219°W

=== United States, Pacific Ocean coast ===
The following coastal rivers of the United States have their mouth on the Pacific Ocean:

U.S. Pacific Ocean coastal rivers
| Name | State (mouth) | route to Pacific | Coordinates (mouth) |
|---|---|---|---|
| Yukon River | Alaska | | 62°35′55″N 164°48′00″W |
| Nome River | Alaska | Norton Sound, Bering Sea | 64°53′06″N 165°14′05″W |
| Kuskokwim River | Alaska | Kuskokwim Bay, Bering Sea | 60°04′59″N 162°20′02″W |
| Bering River | Alaska | Gulf of Alaska | 60°09′59″N 144°14′59″W |
| Nushagak River | Alaska | Nushagak Bay | 58°47′58″N 158°37′57″W |
| Peaceful River | Alaska | Bering Sea | 52°49′31″N 173°10′56″E |
| Joshua Green River | Alaska | Bristol Bay, Bering Sea | 55°23′30″N 162°29′10″W |
| Meshik River | Alaska | Bristol Bay, Bering Sea | 56°48′32″N 158°39′46″W |
| Seal River | Alaska | Gulf of Alaska | 60°02′27″N 143°30′40″W |
| Yahtse River | Alaska | | 59°51′48″N 141°23′36″W |
| Copper River | Alaska | Copper Bay | 60°23′19″N 144°57′39″W |
| Karluk River | Alaska | Shelikof Strait | 57°34′18″N 154°27′44″W |
| Aniakchak River | Alaska | Aniakchak Bay | 56°45′49″N 157°29′43″W |
| Situk River | Alaska | | 59°26′07″N 139°32′48″W |
| Alsek River | Alaska | Dry Bay, Gulf of Alaska | 59°7′40″N 138°37′14″W |
| Russian River | California | | 38°27′2″N 123°7′46″W |
| Sacramento River | California | Sacramento–San Joaquin River Delta, San Francisco Bay | 38°03′48″N 121°51′10″W |
| San Joaquin River | California | Suisun Bay, San Francisco Bay | 38°04′00″N 121°51′04″W |
| San Diego River | California | | 32°45′37″N 117°12′45″W |
| Santa Margarita River | California | | 33°13′55″N 117°24′58″W |
| Santa Ana River | California | | 33°37′41″N 117°57′31″W |
| San Luis Rey River | California | | 33°12′08″N 117°23′32″W |
| San Gabriel River | California | | 33°44′33″N 118°06′56″W |
| Los Angeles River | California | | 33°45′23″N 118°11′20″W |
| Santa Clara River | California | | 34°14′07″N 119°15′49″W |
| Santa Ynez River | California | | 34°41′31″N 120°36′7″W |
| Santa Maria River | California | | 34°58′15″N 120°39′01″W |
| Salinas River | California | Monterey Bay | 36°44′58″N 121°48′13″W |
| Pajaro River | California | Monterey Bay | 36°51′00″N 121°48′35″W |
| San Lorenzo River | California | Monterey Bay | 36°57′51″N 122°00′45″W |
| Navarro River | California | | 39°11′32″N 123°45′40″W |
| Noyo River | California | | 39°25′40″N 123°48′33″W |
| Mattole River | California | | 40°18′08″N 124°21′14″W |
| Eel River | California | | 40°38′29″N 124°18′44″W |
| Mad River | California | | 40°56′31″N 124°8′6″W |
| Redwood Creek (Humboldt County) | California | | 41°17′32″N 124°05′31″W |
| Redwood Creek (Marin County) | California | | 37°51′35″N 122°34′40″W |
| Klamath River | California | | 41°32′49″N 124°5′0″W |
| Smith River | California | | 41°56′10″N 124°12′12″W |
| Columbia | Oregon | | 46°14′39″N 124°3′29″W |
| Larson Creek | Oregon | | |
| Short Creek | Oregon | | |
| Baughman Creek | Oregon | | 45°27′25″N 123°58′07″W |
| Fall Creek | Oregon | | |
| Hodgdon Creek | Oregon | | 45°26′11″N 123°57′01″W |
| O'Hara Creek | Oregon | | 45°25′51″N 123°56′45″W |
| Rice Creek | Oregon | | 45°25′36″N 123°56′18″W |
| Yager Creek | Oregon | | 45°24′52″N 123°56′01″W |
| Whiskey Creek | Oregon | | |
| Austin Creek | Oregon | | 45°49′09″N 123°57′54″W |
| Hathaway Creek | Oregon | | 45°22′27″N 123°57′30″W |
| Jackson Creek | Oregon | | |
| Jackson Creek | Oregon | | |
| Cape Creek | Oregon | | 44°08′03″N 124°07′25″W |
| Rover Creek | Oregon | | 45°19′41″N 123°58′05″W |
| Allen Creek | Oregon | | 45°19′02″N 123°57′48″W |
| Sand Creek | Oregon | | |
| Miles Creek | Oregon | | 45°14′06″N 123°58′14″W |
| Nestucca River | Oregon | | 45°11′03″N 123°57′26″W |
| Commons Creek | Oregon | | 45°08′27″N 123°58′19″W |
| Neskowin Creek | Oregon | | 45°05′59″N 123°59′13″W |
| Chitwood Creek | Oregon | | 45°04′31″N 124°00′26″W |
| Cliff Creek | Oregon | | 45°04′15″N 124°00′27″W |
| Salmon River | Oregon | | 45°02′48″N 124°00′22″W |
| Logan Creek | Oregon | | 45°00′31″N 124°00′34″W |
| D River | Oregon | | 44°58′02″N 124°01′06″W |
| Agnes Creek | Oregon | | 44°57′34″N 124°01′17″W |
| Baldy Creek | Oregon | | 44°56′29″N 124°01′28″W |
| Siletz River | Oregon | | 44°54′12″N 124°00′41″W |
| Schoolhouse Creek | Oregon | | |
| Fogarty Creek | Oregon | | 44°50′20″N 124°03′14″W |
| Deadhorse Creek | Oregon | | 44°47′16″N 124°03′55″W |
| Rocky Creek | Oregon | | 42°43′22″N 124°28′03″W |
| Dope Creek | Oregon | | 44°45′01″N 124°03′54″W |
| Miner Creek | Oregon | | 42°11′42″N 124°22′18″W |
| Johnson Creek | Oregon | | |
| Spencer Creek | Oregon | | |
| Wade Creek | Oregon | | 44°42′56″N 124°03′41″W |
| Coal Creek | Oregon | | |
| Moolack Creek | Oregon | | 44°42′11″N 124°03′49″W |
| Schooner Creek | Oregon | | 44°41′18″N 124°04′09″W |
| Little Creek | Oregon | | |
| Yaquina River | Oregon | | 44°36′44″N 124°01′04″W |
| Henderson Creek | Oregon | | |
| Grant Creek | Oregon | | |
| Moore Creek | Oregon | | 44°34′19″N 124°04′11″W |
| Thiel Creek | Oregon | | |
| Lost Creek | Oregon | | |
| Beaver Creek | Oregon | | |
| Deer Creek | Oregon | | |
| Hill Creek | Oregon | | |
| Little Creek | Oregon | | |
| Squaw Creek | Oregon | | |
| Collins Creek | Oregon | | |
| Fox Creek | Oregon | | |
| Buckley Creek | Oregon | | 44°27′44″N 124°04′58″W |
| Alsea River | Oregon | | 44°25′21″N 124°04′51″W |
| Little Creek | Oregon | | 44°23′33″N 124°05′21″W |
| Reynolds Creek | Oregon | | 44°22′26″N 124°05′29″W |
| Vingie Creek | Oregon | | 44°20′25″N 124°05′57″W |
| Starr Creek | Oregon | | 44°19′54″N 124°06′06″W |
| Mitchell Creek | Oregon | | 44°19′31″N 124°06′16″W |
| Yachats River | Oregon | | 44°18′30″N 124°06′28″W |
| North Cape Creek | Oregon | | 44°17′27″N 124°06′42″W |
| Cape Creek | Oregon | | 44°08′03″N 124°07′25″W |
| Gwynn Creek | Oregon | | 44°16′13″N 124°06′39″W |
| Cummins Creek | Oregon | | 42°29′24″N 124°25′09″W |
| Nancy Creek | Oregon | | |
| Bob Creek | Oregon | | 44°14′38″N 124°06′42″W |
| Agate Creek | Oregon | | 44°14′05″N 124°06′34″W |
| Tenmile Creek | Oregon | | 44°13′31″N 124°06′39″W |
| Tokatee Creek | Oregon | | |
| Nancy Creek | Oregon | | 44°15′24″N 124°06′39″W |
| Rock Creek | Oregon | | |
| Big Creek | Oregon | | 44°10′35″N 124°06′53″W |
| China Creek | Oregon | | 42°10′27″N 124°21′46″W |
| Blowout Creek | Oregon | | 44°09′25″N 124°07′04″W |
| Cape Creek | Oregon | | 44°08′03″N 124°07′25″W |
| Horse Creek | Oregon | | |
| Berry Creek | Oregon | | |
| Siuslaw River | Oregon | | 44°01′01″N 124°08′14″W |
| Siltcoos River | Oregon | | 43°52′25″N 124°09′14″W |
| Tahkenitch Creek | Oregon | | 43°48′53″N 124°09′58″W |
| Threemile Creek | Oregon | | |
| Umpqua River | Oregon | | 43°40′09″N 124°12′18″W |
| Tenmile Creek | Oregon | | 43°33′42″N 124°13′55″W |
| Coos River | Oregon | | 43°21′45″N 124°10′25″W |
| Coquille River | Oregon | | 43°07′25″N 124°25′48″W |
| Tupper Creek | Oregon | | 43°06′45″N 124°25′58″W |
| Johnson Creek | Oregon | | |
| Crooked Creek | Oregon | | |
| China Creek | Oregon | | |
| Twomile Creek | Oregon | | 43°02′39″N 124°26′33″W |
| New River | Oregon | | 43°00′02″N 124°27′30″W |
| Sixes River | Oregon | | 42°51′13″N 124°32′38″W |
| Elk River | Oregon | | 42°47′35″N 124°31′32″W |
| Gold Run Creek | Oregon | | |
| Hubbard Creek | Oregon | | |
| Rocky Creek | Oregon | | |
| Rocky Point Creek | Oregon | | |
| Retz Creek | Oregon | | |
| Brush Creek | Oregon | | |
| Reinhart Creek | Oregon | | |
| Mussel Creek | Oregon | | |
| O'Brien Creek | Oregon | | |
| Euchre Creek | Oregon | | |
| Greggs Creek | Oregon | | |
| Parker Creek | Oregon | | |
| Rogue River | Oregon | | 42°25′21″N 124°25′45″W |
| Sand Creek | Oregon | | |
| Burnt Hill Creek | Oregon | | |
| Whiskey Creek | Oregon | | |
| Hooskanaden Creek | Oregon | | 42°12′48″N 124°22′43″W |
| Miner Creek | Oregon | | |
| Wridge Creek | Oregon | | |
| Dunning Creek | Oregon | | |
| Horse Prairie Creek | Oregon | | 42°11′07″N 124°21′53″W |
| Spruce Creek | Oregon | | |
| China Creek | Oregon | | |
| Thomas Creek | Oregon | | 42°09′56″N 124°21′42″W |
| Bruces Bones Creek | Oregon | | 42°09′37″N 124°21′41″W |
| Whalehead Creek | Oregon | | 42°08′36″N 124°21′24″W |
| Coon Creek | Oregon | | |
| Bowman Creek | Oregon | | 42°08′11″N 124°21′12″W |
| House Rock Creek | Oregon | | 42°06′49″N 124°21′04″W |
| Lone Ranch Creek | Oregon | | 42°06′01″N 124°20′45″W |
| Ram Creek | Oregon | | 42°05′53″N 124°20′31″W |
| Taylor Creek | Oregon | | |
| Shy Creek | Oregon | | 42°04′36″N 124°19′14″W |
| Harris Creek | Oregon | | 42°04′06″N 124°18′57″W |
| Eiler Creek | Oregon | | 42°03′49″N 124°18′14″W |
| Ransom Creek | Oregon | | 42°03′39″N 124°18′09″W |
| Macklyn Creek | Oregon | | 42°02′57″N 124°17′34″W |
| Chetco River | Oregon | | 42°02′43″N 124°16′14″W |
| Tuttle Creek | Oregon | | 42°02′34″N 124°15′59″W |
| Stack Creek | Oregon | | 42°01′53″N 124°15′15″W |
| O'Loughlin Gulch | Oregon | | |
| Johnson Creek | Oregon | | |
| McVey Creek | Oregon | | 44°05′49″N 123°40′15″W |
| Cooley Creek | Oregon | | |
| Winchuck River | Oregon | | 42°00′18″N 124°12′55″W |
| Necanicum River | Oregon | | 46°0′41″N 123°55′39″W |
| Nehalem River | Oregon | | 45°39′29″N 123°56′04″W |
| Miami River | Oregon | | 45°33′35″N 123°53′37″W |
| Kilchis River | Oregon | | 45°29′46″N 123°51′53″W |
| Wilson River | Oregon | | 45°28′44″N 123°53′24″W |
| Trask River | Oregon | | 45°28′13″N 123°52′57″W |
| Tillamook River | Oregon | | 45°29′15″N 123°54′06″W |
| Waatch River | Washington State | | 48°20′37″N 124°40′31″W |
| Sooes River | Washington State | | 48°19′27″N 124°39′27″W |
| Ozette River | Washington State | | 48°10′53″N 124°42′34″W |
| Quillayute River | Washington State | | 47°54′30″N 124°38′32″W |
| Goodman Creek | Washington State | | 47°49′21″N 124°30′45″W |
| Hoh River | Washington State | | 47°44′58″N 124°26′21″W |
| Kalaloch Creek | Washington State | | 47°36′25″N 124°22′35″W |
| Queets River | Washington State | | 47°32′40″N 124°21′22″W |
| Raft River | Washington State | | 47°27′42″N 124°20′34″W |
| Quinault River | Washington State | | 47°20′58″N 124°17′59″W |
| Moclips River | Washington State | | 47°14′52″N 124°13′10″W |
| Joe Creek | Washington State | | |
| Copalis River | Washington State | | 47°7′34″N 124°10′47″W |
| Willapa River | Washington State | Willapa Bay | 46°42′27″N 123°51′02″W |

== Endorheic basins ==
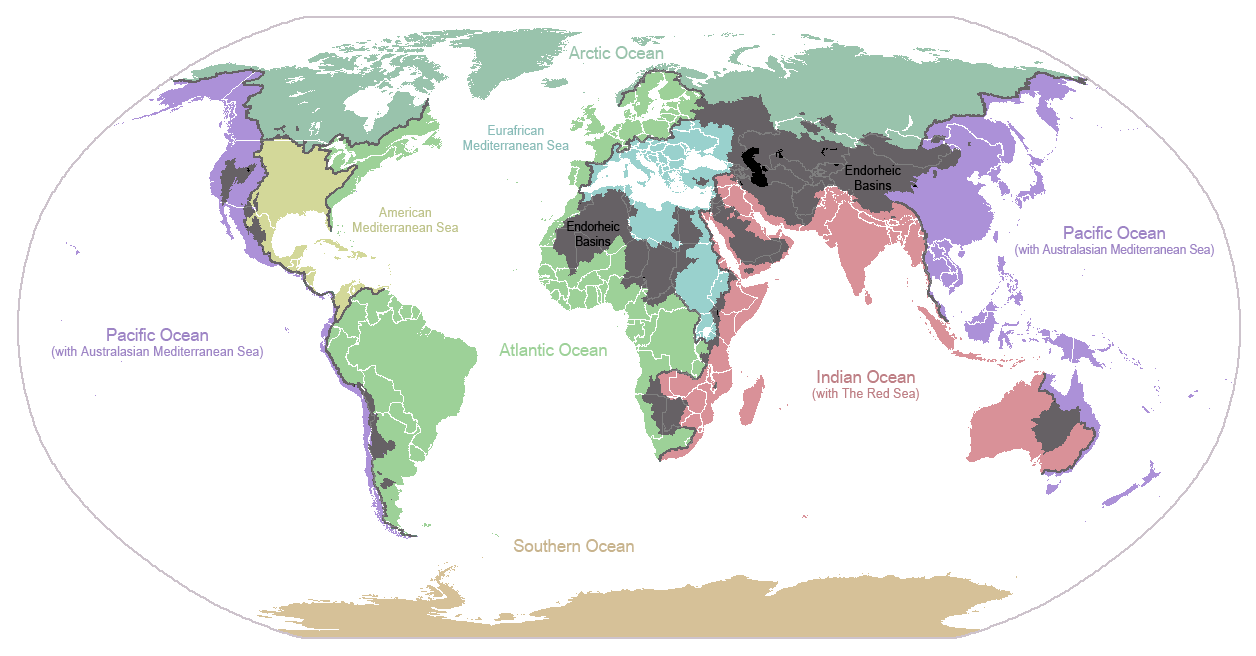
Major endorheic basins of the world. Basins are shown in dark gray; major endorheic lakes are shown in black. Colored regions represent the major drainage patterns of the continents to the oceans (non-endorheic). Continental divides are indicated by dark lines.

There are Endorheic basins in several regions of the Americas. Rivers in these basins do not reach the oceans. The largest endorheic basin is the Great Basin (209,162 mi^{2} (541,730 km^{2})) in North America. There are also several endorheic basins in South America, including the Altiplano Basin (59,528 mi^{2} (154,180 km^{2})).

== See also ==
- Arctic#Arctic waters
- Geography of North America
- Geography of South America
