= List of rivers of El Salvador =

This is a list of rivers in El Salvador.

El Salvador has 58 river basins which all drain to the Pacific Ocean. The total amount of water discharged into the Pacific is 19 million m^{3} in a normal year. Additionally, there are several endorheic basins linked to a lake. Coatepeque Lake is the largest endorheic basin in the country.

== By drainage basin ==
This list is arranged by drainage basin, with respective tributaries indented under each larger stream's name.

=== Pacific Ocean ===
- Banderas River
- Cara Sucia River
- Comalapa River
- Copinula River
- El Guayabo River
- El Molino River
- El Potrero River
- Goascorán River
- Jalponga River
- Jiboa River
- Lempa River
  - Acelhuate River
  - Ostúa River
  - Sumpul River
  - Torola River
- Paz River
- Pululuya River
- Río Grande de San Miguel
- Sensunapan River
- Sirama River

== See also ==
- List of rivers of the Americas by coastline
