= Toabré =

Toabré may refer to:

- Toabré, Burkina Faso
- Toabré, Panama
- Toabré River, Panama

== See also ==
- Toab (disambiguation)
