= Monagrillo =

Monagrillo may refer to:

- Monagrillo (corregimiento)
- Monagrillo (archaeological site)
