= Mamoní River =

Mamoni River

Location
- Country: Panama

Physical characteristics
- Mouth
  - location: 9°7′54″N 79°3′35″W

The Mamoni River is a river of Panama.

The Mamoní runs along the Pacora in eastern Panama, draining east then turning south to join the Chepo River just southeast of the town of Chepo.

The Mamoní can be divided into three with the upper Mamoní and the lower Mamoní separated by the Mamoní gorge.

== See also ==
- List of rivers of Panama
