= David River =

David River may refer to:

- David River (Yamaska River tributary), on the border of the Centre-du-Québec and Montérégie regions in Quebec, Canada
- David River (Panama)
