= Black panther =

Variant of leopard and jaguar

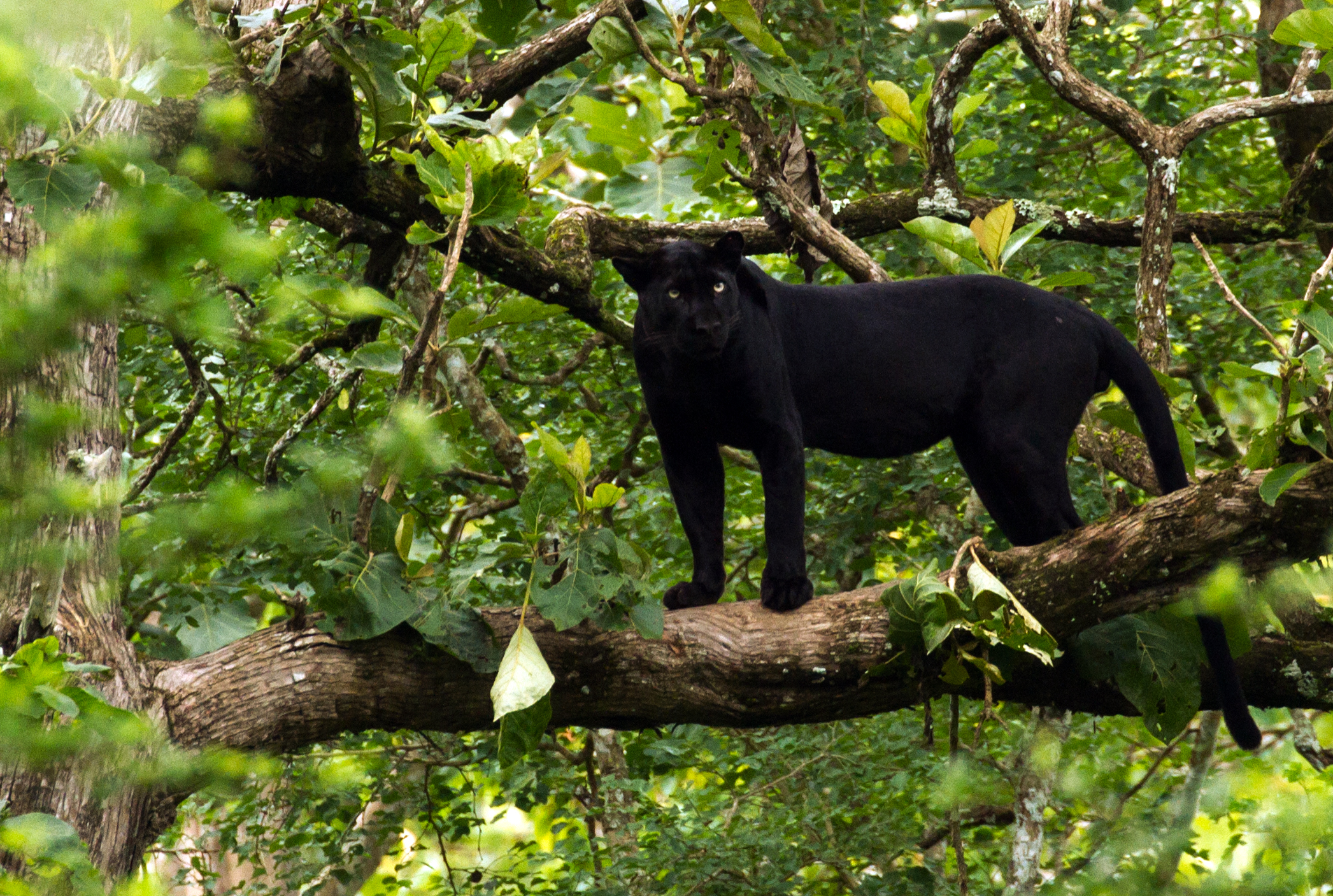
A melanistic Indian leopard in Nagarhole National Park, Karnataka

A black panther is the melanistic colour variant of the leopard (Panthera pardus) and the jaguar (Panthera onca). Black panthers of both species have excess black pigments, but their typical rosettes are also present. They have been documented mostly in tropical forests, with black leopards in Africa and Asia, and black jaguars in Central and South America. Melanism is caused by a recessive allele in the leopard, and by a dominant allele in the jaguar.

== Leopard ==
A melanistic leopard at Out of Africa Wildlife Park in Camp Verde, Arizona

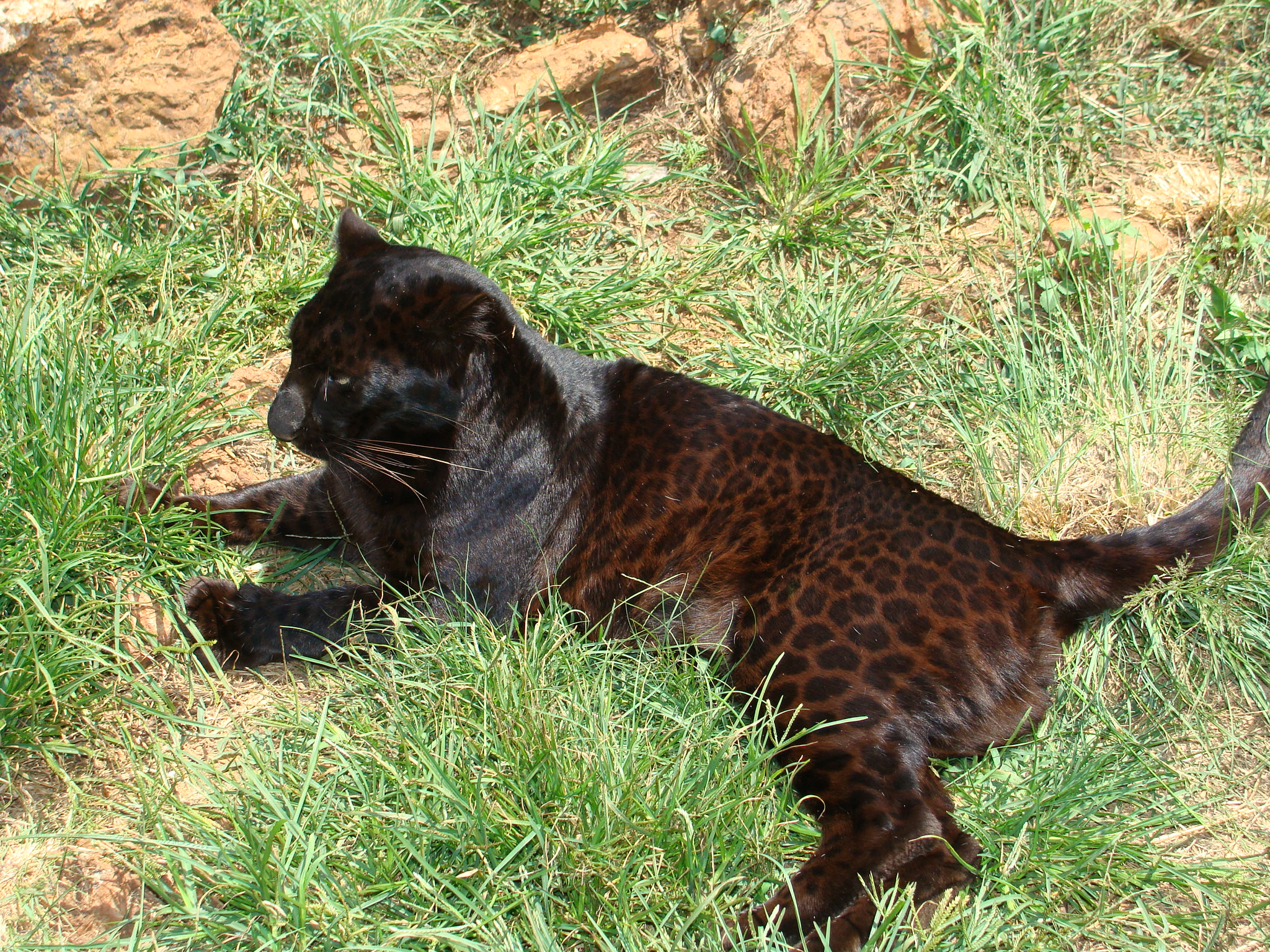
Particularly prominent rosettes on a female black leopard at the Rhino and Lion Nature Reserve in Kromdraai

In 1788, Jean-Claude Delamétherie described a black leopard that was kept in the Tower of London and had been brought from Bengal. In 1794, Friedrich Albrecht Anton Meyer proposed the scientific name Felis fusca for this cat, the Indian leopard (P. p. fusca). In 1809, Georges Cuvier described a black leopard kept in the Ménagerie du Jardin des plantes that had been brought from Java. Cuvier proposed the name Felis melas, the Javan leopard (P. p. melas). By the late 19th century, the occurrence of black and spotted leopard cubs in the same litter had been repeatedly recorded in India. Black leopards were thought to be more common in Travancore and in the hills of southern India than in other parts of the country. Black leopards were also frequently encountered in southern Myanmar. By 1929, the Natural History Museum, London had skins of black leopards collected in South Africa, Nepal, Assam and Kanara in India. Black leopards were thought to be common on the Malay Peninsula and on Java.

A black African leopard (P. p. pardus) was sighted in the alpine zone of Mount Kenya in the winter of 1989–1990. In Kenya's Laikipia County, a black leopard was photographed by a camera trap in 2007; in 2018, a female subadult black leopard was repeatedly recorded together with a spotted leopard about 50 km (31 mi) farther east in a grassland.

In India's Western Ghats, black leopards were sighted and photographed in 2010 and 2012 in the Kas Plateau Reserved Forest, and in Bhadra Wildlife Sanctuary in 2012. In 2015, a dead black leopard was found on a highway near Satara in Maharashtra. In May 2012, a black leopard was photographed at an elevation of 4,300 m (14,100 ft) in Nepal's Kanchenjunga Conservation Area.

At least one black leopard was photographed in mixed deciduous forest in Thailand's Kaeng Krachan National Park during a one-year-long camera trapping survey from 2003 to 2004. In 2009, black leopards were photographed more often than spotted leopards in Kui Buri National Park. Most leopards recorded at 16 sites south of the Kra Isthmus between 1996 and 2009 were black, indicating a near-fixation of melanism in Peninsular Malaysia. In 2019, a black individual was photographed outside a protected area in Jeli District. Both black and spotted leopards were recorded in Gunung Gede Pangrango National Park in West Java between 2005 and 2017.

Frequency of melanism appears to be approximately 11% over the leopard's range. Data on the distribution of leopard populations indicates that melanism occurs in five subspecies in the wild: the Indian leopard, Javan leopard, African leopard, Indochinese leopard (P. p. delacouri) and Sri Lankan leopard (P. p. kotiya). Based on records from camera traps, melanistic leopards occur foremost in tropical and subtropical moist broadleaf forests.

Melanism in the leopard is conferred by a recessive allele. It is thought that melanism confers a selective advantage under certain conditions since it is more common in regions of dense forest, where light levels are lower. Preliminary studies also suggest that melanism might be linked to beneficial mutations in the immune system. The typical spots and rosettes are present but hidden due to the excess melanin.

The taxonomic status of captive black leopards and the extent of hybridization between the Javan leopard and other leopard subspecies is uncertain. Therefore, coordinated breeding programs for black leopards do not exist in European and North American zoos. Black leopards occupy space needed for breeding endangered leopard subspecies and are not included within the North American Species Survival Plan. A black Amur leopard (P. p. orientalis) was exhibited at the San Diego Zoo in 2017.

A pseudo-melanistic leopard has a normal background color, but the spots are more densely packed than normal, and merge to obscure the golden-brown background color. Any spots on the flanks and limbs that have not merged into the mass of swirls and stripes are unusually small and discrete, rather than forming rosettes. The face and underparts are paler and dappled, like those of ordinary spotted leopards.

== Jaguar ==
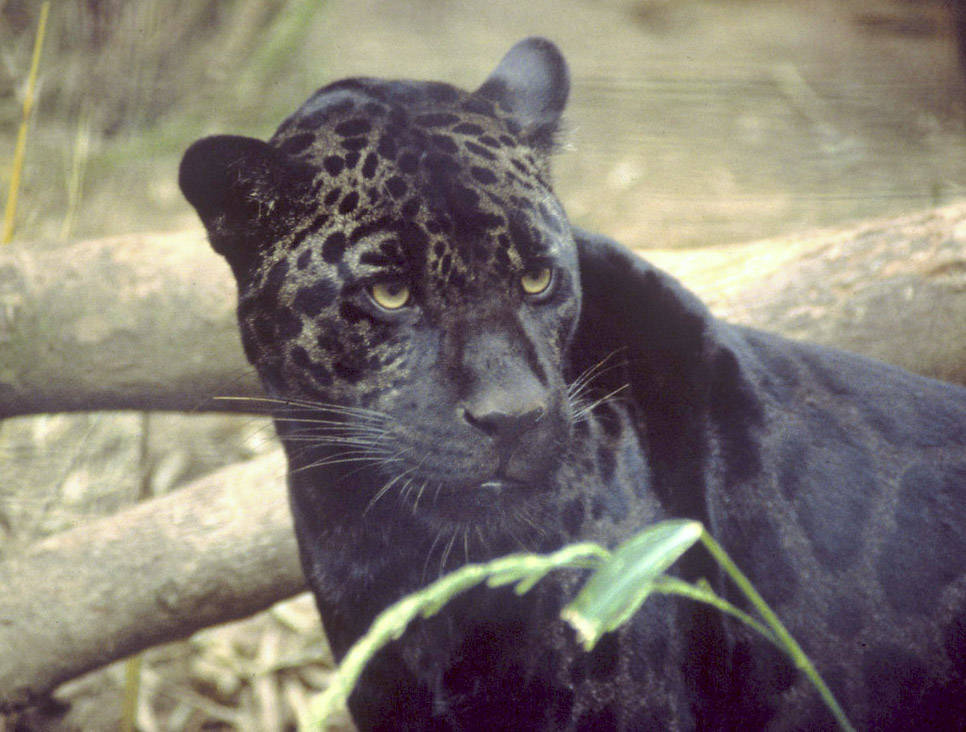
A melanistic jaguar with visible rosettes

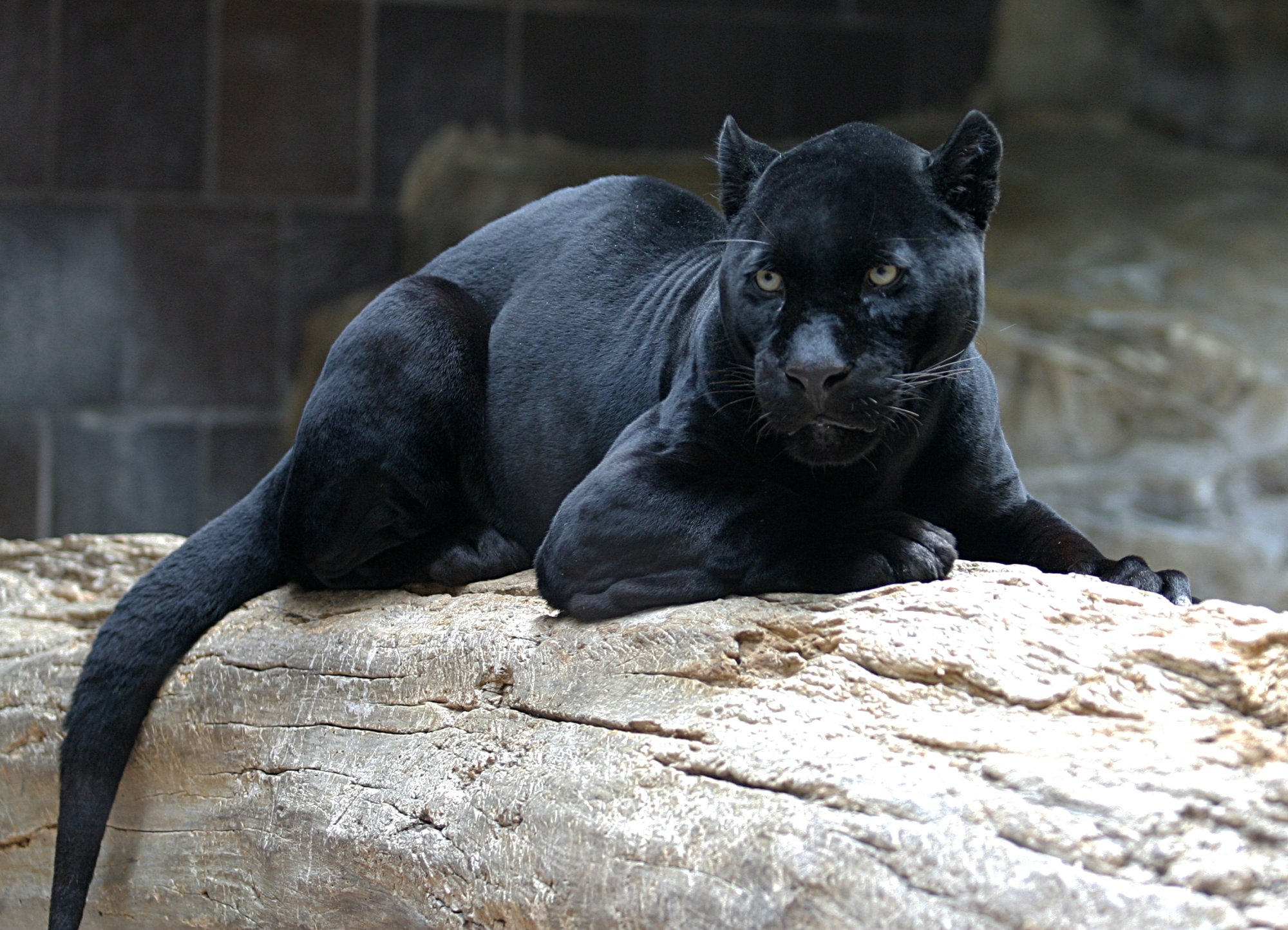
A melanistic jaguar at the Henry Doorly Zoo

In 1801, Félix de Azara described a black jaguar observed by local people near the Paraná River in Paraguay. In 2004, a female black jaguar was recorded in Mexico's Sierra Madre Occidental. In 2009, a black jaguar was photographed by a camera trap for the first time in Costa Rica's Alberto Manuel Brenes Biological Reserve. In Barbilla National Park, black jaguars were recorded in 2013. In the mountains of the Cordillera de Talamanca, 104 records of jaguars were obtained between 2010 and 2019; 26 of them showed melanistic jaguars. In eastern Panama, black jaguars were repeatedly photographed in the Mamoní River Valley between 2016 and 2018, mostly in primary forest. Five black jaguars have been monitored in the Várzea forest of Mamirauá Sustainable Development Reserve in the Brazilian State of Amazonas between 2003 and 2018. Black jaguars were also recorded in the Brazilian Pará state.

Melanism in the jaguar is caused by deletions in the melanocortin 1 receptor gene and conferred by a dominant allele.

== Cougar ==
There is no authenticated case of a truly melanistic cougar. No specimen has been photographed or killed in the wild, nor has it ever been bred in captivity. Unconfirmed sightings known as the "North American black panther" are currently attributed to errors in species identification by non-experts, and by the mimetic exaggeration of size.

In Florida, a few melanistic bobcats have been captured; these have apparently been mistaken for Florida panthers; two bobcats captured in Martin County in 1939 and 1940 appear black in photographs and descriptions.

== See also ==
- Black cat
- Black tiger
- White panther
- Bagheera, a black leopard in Rudyard Kipling's 1894 short story collection The Jungle Book
