= Banderas =

Banderas may refer to:

== People ==
- Alberto Del Rio (Alberto Banderas), Mexican professional wrestler
- Antonio Banderas (born 1960), Spanish actor
- Josh Banderas (born 1995), American football player
- Julie Banderas, American television news correspondent and weekend anchor for the Fox News Channel
- Marco Banderas, Uruguayan-Spanish porn actor
- Ricky Banderas, Puerto Rican professional wrestler

== Places ==
- Bahía de Banderas, a bay and a municipality in Mexico
- Banderas River, a river in El Salvador
- Banderas (TransMilenio), a mass transit station in Bogotá, Colombia

== Music ==
- Banderas (duo), a British female pop duo
- Banderas, a 2016 album by L'Algérino
