= Situk River =

River in Alaska, United States of America

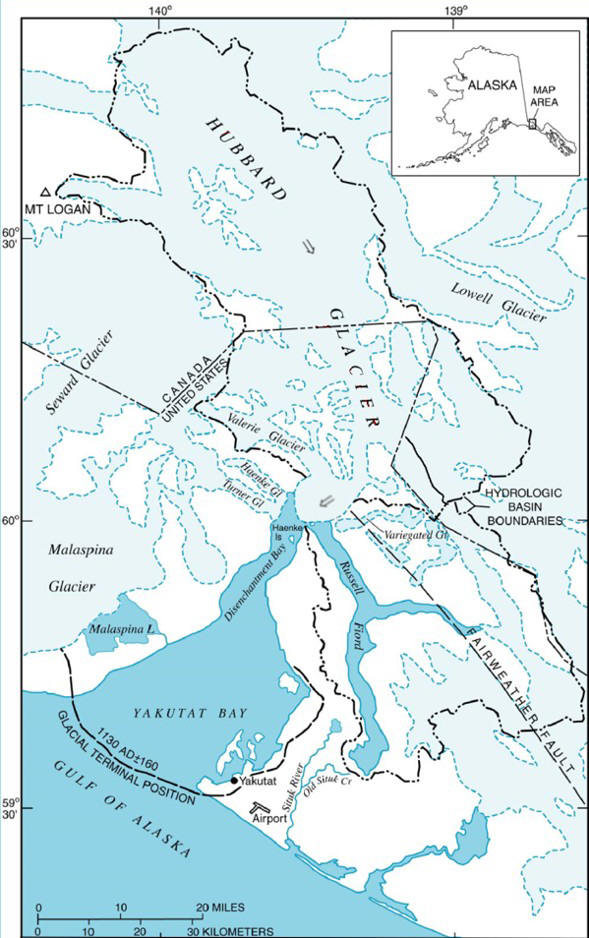
- The Situk River drains is south of the Prince William Sound.

- Location of mouth

Location
- Country: United States
- State: Alaska
- County: Yakutat

Physical characteristics
- Source
  - location: Situk Lake
  - coordinates: 59°37′57″N 139°24′38″W
- Mouth
  - location: Gulf of Alaska, Pacific Ocean
  - coordinates: 59°26′07″N 139°32′48″W
  - elevation: 0 ft (0 m)

The Situk River in the Gulf of Alaska Watershed drains a portion of Yakutat City and Borough, Alaska. The Alaskan natives name was reported as R(eka) Sita or Sitak River by Captain Tebenkov (1852, map 7), Imperial Russian Navy (IRN). It was spelled Situk by E. J. Glave in 1890, and See-tuck by Lieutenant Commander J. F. Moser, U.S. Navy (USN), in 1901.

The Situk River is highly regarded fly fishing destination by many, with anglers traveling to Yakutat specifically to fish this river. Spring steelhead trout, sockeye salmon, and coho salmon can be caught here. Access is from the upper crossing on Dangerous River Road or from a second road that accesses the river near the ocean mouth. All day float trips between these two access points can be arranged from the many fishing lodges in Yakutat.

== See also ==
- List of rivers of the Americas by coastline
