= Toab =

Toab may refer to:

- Toab, Orkney, Scotland
- Toab, Shetland, Scotland

== See also ==
- Tetraoctylammonium bromide (TOAB)
- Toabré (disambiguation)
