= Nombre de Dios River =

River in Panama

Location
- Country: Panama

The Nombre de Dios River is a river of Panama. It is 3 kilometers long and is in the Colón subregion of Panama.

== See also ==
- List of rivers of Panama
