= List of rivers of Panama =

This is a list of rivers in Panama.

== By drainage basin ==
This list is arranged by drainage basin, with respective tributaries indented under each larger stream's name.

=== Caribbean Sea, Atlantic Ocean ===
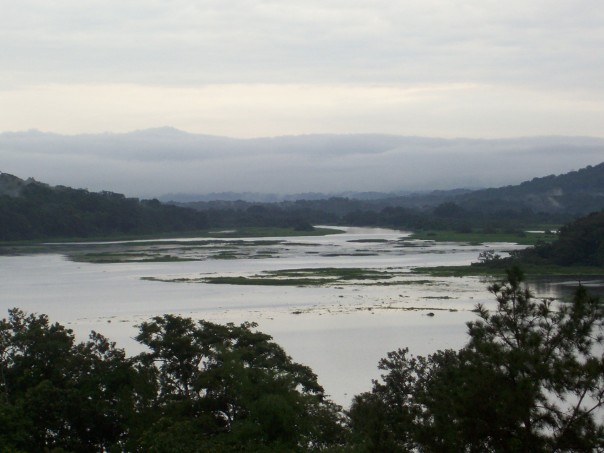
The Chagres River as seen from the Rainforest Resort in Gamboa, Panama

- Sixaola River
  - Yorkin River
- San Carlos River
- Changuinola River
  - Sini River
  - Teribe River
  - Tigre River
  - Quebrada El Mono
  - Quebrada Carbon
  - Quebrada Junco
- Guariviara River
- Cricamola River
- 60km information gap
- Calovebora River
- 75km information gap
- Cocle del Norte River
  - Toabré River
- Miguel de La Borda
- Indio River
- Lagarto
- Chagres River
  - Gatún River
- Cascajal River (associated to Portobelo)
- Nombre de Dios River
- Mandinga
  - Cangandi River
- 200km information gap to the Colombian border.

=== Pacific Ocean ===
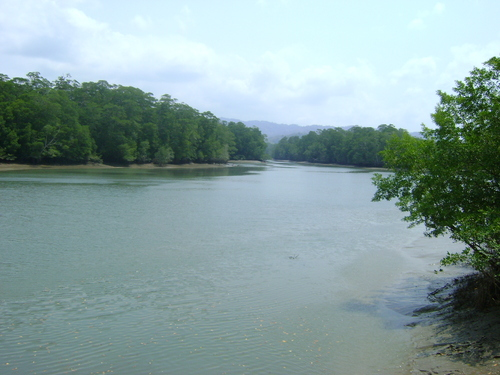
Chucunaque River is the longest river in Panama

- Guanábano
- Corotú
- Rabo de Puerco
- San Bártolo
- Palo Blanco
- Colorado
- Chiriquí Viejo River
- Duablo
- Platanal
  - Río Chico
    - Piedra
  - Chiriquí Nuevo River
    - David River
      - Majagua River
    - Caldera River
- Chorcha
- Las Vueltas
- Estero de Ajo
- Fonseca
- San Juan
  - Jocoy
- San Felix River
  - Piedra
- Santiago
- Tabasara River
- Lobaina
- Cate
- San Pablo River
  - Cobre River
- San Pedro
  - Río Martín Grande
  - Piña
  - Ponuga
- Suay
- Mariato
- Palo Seco
- a further lot of minor rivers in the Azuero Peninsula
- La Villa River
- Parita
- Santa Maria River
- Pocrí
- Grande River
  - Chico River
  - Caño
  - Cocle del Sur River
  - Rio Hondo
- Anton River
- Farallon
- Chame
- Caimito
- Cabra
- Pacora River
- Chepo River (Bayano River)
  - Mamoní River
- Congo River
  - Santa Barbara
- Sabanas River
  - Lara River
- Tuira River
  - Chucunaque River
    - Río Chico
  - Balsas River
- Sambú River
- Jaqué River

=== Coiba Island ===
the island has 5 rivers flowing separately into the Pacific Ocean.

== See also ==
- List of rivers of the Americas by coastline
