= San Felix River =

- Location of mouth
- Native name: Río San Félix (Spanish)

Location
- Country: Panama

Physical characteristics
- Mouth
  - coordinates: 8°09′42″N 81°50′45″W

The San Félix River (Río San Félix) is a river of Panama.

== See also ==
- List of rivers of Panama
- List of rivers of the Americas by coastline
