= Santa María River (Panama) =

River in Panama

- Location of mouth

Location
- Country: Panama

Physical characteristics
- Mouth
  - coordinates: 8°05′27″N 80°29′00″W

The Santa María River is a river of Panama. The river runs approximately 148 kilometers. The Santa María River's headwaters are located in the district of Santa Fe, Veraguas. The mouth of the river is in the Gulf of Parita in Panama's Herrera Province.

== See also ==
- List of rivers of Panama
