= Cascajal River =

- Location of mouth

Location
- Country: Panama

The Cascajal River is a river of Panama.

== See also ==
- List of rivers of Panama
