= Piaxtla River =

River in Mexico

- Location of mouth

Location
- Country: Mexico
- State: Sinaloa

Physical characteristics
- Mouth
  - location: Pacific Ocean
  - coordinates: 23°42′18″N 106°48′16″W
  - elevation: Sea level
- Length: 220 km (140 mi)
- Basin size: 11,473 km^{2} (4,430 sq mi)

The Piaxtla River is a short coastal river of the northwest area of Mexico that flows into the Pacific Ocean, it has a length of 220 km and drains a basin of 11,473 km².

== See also ==
- List of rivers of Mexico
- List of rivers of the Americas by coastline
