= Cocle del Sur River =

River in Coclé Province, Panama

- Cocle del Sur River (Provincia de Coclé)

Location
- Country: Panama
- Province: Coclé

Physical characteristics
- Source
  - location: 8°38′28″N 80°26′50″W
- Mouth
  - location: 8°28′22″N 80°25′52″W

The Cocle del Sur River is a river in the Coclé Province of Panama.

The river rises near Llano Grande and runs south, past La Pintada and Santa Maria before joining the Rio Zarati.

== See also ==
- List of rivers of Panama
