= Río Santa Rosalía =

River in Mexico

- Location of mout

Location
- Country: Mexico
- State: Baja California Sur

Physical characteristics
- Mouth
  - location: Gulf of California
  - coordinates: 26°54′N 111°59′W

Modern-day Río Santa Rosalía in the Mexican state of Baja California Sur was originally named Río Santa Rosalía de Mulegé, the same name given to the Spanish mission in the town of Mulegé. The river empties into the Gulf of California. The name of the river has been shortened to Río Santa Rosalía, and likewise the name of the town has been reduced to simply "Mulegé." Another city grew about 30 miles north of Mulegé because of a large copper mining operation. This city borrowed the name Santa Rosalía and it is likely for this reason that "Santa Rosalía de" was dropped from the name Mulegé.

== See also ==
- List of rivers of Mexico
- List of rivers of the Americas by coastline
