= Tabasara River =

River in Panama

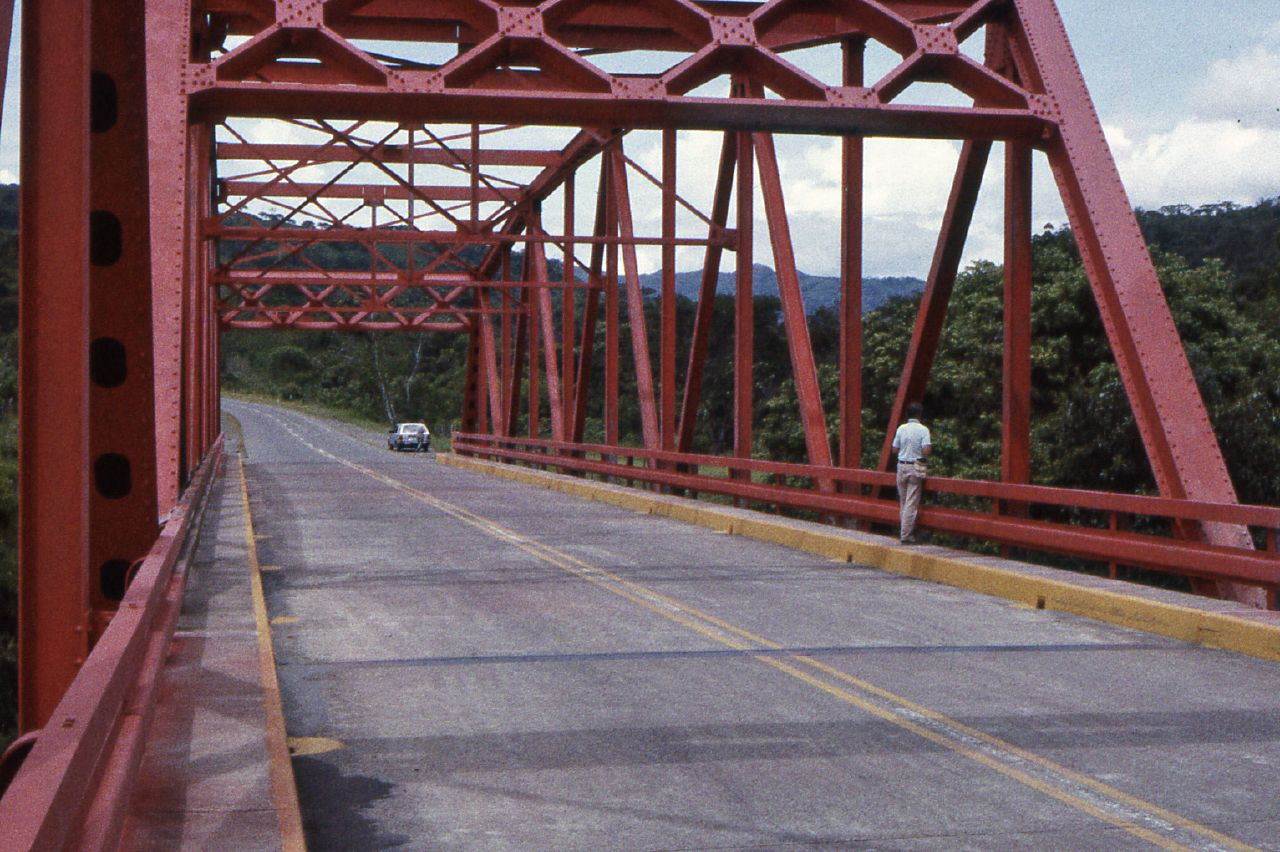

- Location of mouth
- Native name: Rio Tabasara (Spanish)

Location
- Country: Panama

Physical characteristics
- Mouth
  - coordinates: 8°01′43″N 81°42′02″W

The Tabasara River is a river of Panama. The Barro Blanco dam, a gravity dam, was built on the Tabasara river. It began generating in 2017.

== See also ==
- List of rivers of Panama
- List of rivers of the Americas by coastline
