= Lara River =

Location
- Country: Panama

The Lara River is a river of Panama.

== See also ==
- List of rivers of Panama
