= Monagrillo (archaeological site) =

Archaeological site in Herrera, Panama

Coordinates: 7.9934°N 80.4444°W

Monagrillo (also known as He-5) is an archaeological site in south-central Panama with ceramics that have been shown by radiocarbon dating to have an occupation range of about 2500 BC—1200 BC. The site is important because it provides the earliest example of ceramics in Central America along with one of the earliest examples of maize agriculture in the region. The site lies along Panama's most fruitful seacoast. and reached a maximum living area of 1.4 ha

== Setting in Parita Bay ==
The site lies along or very near the modern shoreline of Parita Bay, on the Pacific side of Panama near the base of the Azuero Peninsula. It is 5 km northeast of Chitré, the capital of Herrera Province. It sits 1.5 km south of the Parita River on a strip of land that juts into what is today a salt flat.

The shallow, silt-filled Parita Bay forms the northwest corner of the Gulf of Panama. Large populations of mollusks, crustaceans, and fish thrive in the bay’s modern mud flats and have done so for the past 7000 years, according to archaeological evidence. Mangroves line the shore which is backed by low-lying swamps, marshes, and salt flats. Plains then encircle much of this low area and extend inland 20 to 30 km. Major river systems with wide floodplains cut through the plains and discharge into the bay.

Nearby archaeological sites include Cerro Mangote, Cueva de los Ladrones, Aguadulce Shelter, Zapotal, and Sarigual.

== Site Description ==
Monagrillo measures 210 m by 85 m and “consists of two low, parallel ridges separated by a central trough." The ridges contain archaeological deposits averaging 2 m in height along the main axis.

== History of Research ==
Matthew W. Stirling discovered and tested the site in 1948, and Gordon R. Willey and Charles R. McGimsey followed with major excavations in 1952. Approximately 435 sq m were excavated during the 1948 and 1952 field seasons. In 1975, Anthony J. Ranere excavated a 1 m by 2 m cut from the site’s south ridge and a 2 m by 2 m cut from the north ridge.

== Interpretation ==
Findings by Ranere in 1975 support conclusions of Willey and McGimsey 23 years earlier that during initial occupation, the site was situated along the active shoreline of Parita Bay. Water-worn potsherds of the lowest layers indicate that both ridges were subject to flooding during spring tides, suggesting that occupation was not initially year-round. Later, the modern coastline “was established through the buildup of an offshore bar”, and the ridges of the site became surrounded by a water-filled lagoon. Hearths, post-holes, and pits became common, and shell, bone, pottery, charcoal, and stone tools became more concentrated, suggesting a more permanent occupation once the ridges were safe from flooding. Ranere and Hansell (1978) also argue that the abandonment of the site by its occupants later coincides with the lagoon’s being silted in and its conversion into a salt flat. Placement of Monagrillo maximized access to aquatic resources; whereas terrestrial resources may have been accessed through small camp sites on the plains (such as the Aguadulce Shelter) or in the foothills (such as La Cueva de los Ladrones).

=== Ceramics and Stone Tools ===
Emphasizing open bowls and neckless jars, Monagrillo phase pottery is simple, somewhat crude, and poorly fired. The ceramics are monochrome. Decoration, when it occurs, generally reflects ‘plastic’ techniques confined to “a rather primitive-looking meander-incising” occasionally combined with “excising in scroll patterns”. The oldest ceramics were reliably dated to around 2500 BCE. Monagrillo pottery continues to be the oldest known pottery in Panama as well as in all of Central America.

Ferdon (1955) reports that other artifacts, which all consist of stone, are also simple. Stone choppers and scrapers are crude percussion flaked specimens, while their grinding stones reveal little or no shaping before use. The heavy reliance in stone tools on naturally-shaped cobbles is a trait clearly surviving from the earlier and preceramic Cerro Mangote culture as reported on by McGimsey in 1956. Given the presence of shell, it is surprising that there is a total absence of shell artifacts.

=== Faunal remains ===
Occupants of Monagrillo relied heavily upon aquatic food sources. Shell representing “mud flat and/or sandy, shallow-water species” was found in large quantities, but it “tended to occur in concentrated lenses rather than in an evenly distributed fashion”. Oysters were initially dominant, but when “the silt-burdened lagoon floor was formed,” surrounding conditions became favorable for the proliferation of clams. These became more common in the cultural layer. Later, the lagoon became silted in and oysters became common in the bay. The frequency of oysters again surpassed that of clams in the diets of the occupants. Whereas only 37 fish vertebrae and 50 crab claws were reported following early excavations, fieldwork in 1975 recovered thousands of “small sardine-sized” fish vertebrae and “hundreds upon hundreds” of crab claws. It has been suggested that the site’s occupants used fine-meshed nets and watercraft. Recovered in the 1975 excavations were 97 mammal bones. White-tailed deer (Odocoileus) accounted for 70% of the mammal remains, while collared peccary (Tayassu tajacu), agouti (Dasyprocta punctata), cottontail rabbit (Sivilagus sp.), and armadillo (Dayspus sp.) were also present. While animal protein was mostly acquired through aquatic sources, deer also provided a significant amount.

=== Floral remains ===
Some plant remains have also been recovered from Monagrillo, resulting in an important late discovery. Large quantities of charred plant remains were found, consisting largely of wood charcoal, but also including a few fragments of palm nuts. During the 1975 excavations, Ranere’s team searched carefully for remains of maize, but none were found. However, it argued that the presence of cobbles with grinding edges suggests that occupants did process and consume plant foods. In 1998, Piperno and Holst reported that phytoliths and pollen were not recovered from Monagrillo. However, an edge-ground cobble recently recovered “from just beneath the surface” contained maize and starch grains resembling manioc. A different edge-ground cobble recovered from 20–30 cm below the surface “yielded palm phytoliths and a starch grain characteristic of maize”. These admittedly limited results seem to indicate the presence of maize and possibly manioc at Monagrillo, something that had previously been elusive to researchers.
