= Gatún River =

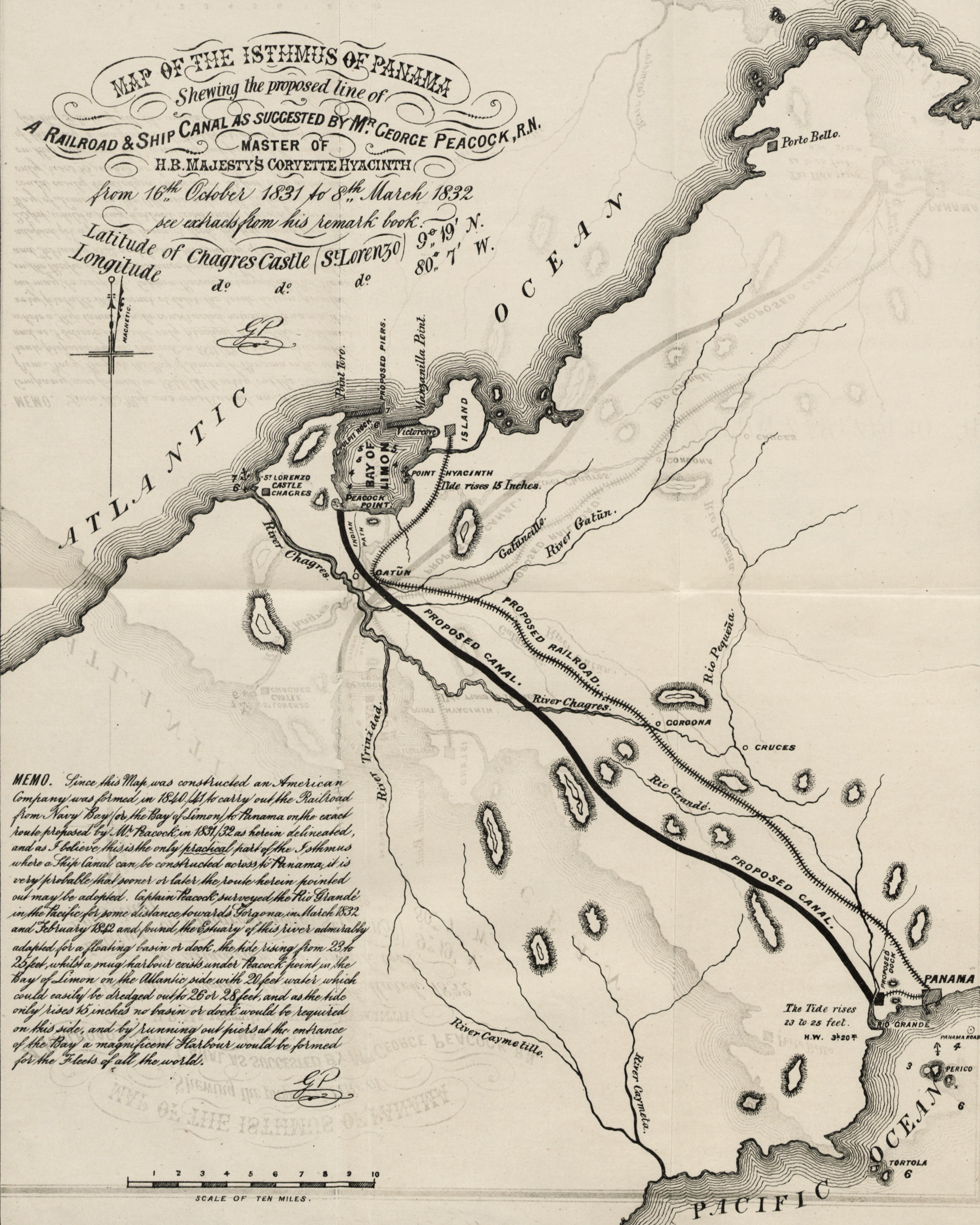
- Original course of the Gatún River before construction of the canal

Location
- Country: Panama

Physical characteristics
- Mouth
  - location: Gatun Lake

Basin features
- Bridges: The Gatún River Bridge (located on the Trans-Isthmian Highway)

The Gatún River is a river of Panama. It is one of the feeders of the summit section (Gatun Lake).

== Geography ==
Flowing from the watersheds of Colón, the Gatún River boats eight tributaries and crosses through the Trans-Isthmian Highway and Don Alberto Motta Highway.

== See also ==
- List of rivers of Panama
