= Peaceful River (Alaska) =

River in Alaska, the United States of America

- Location of the mouth of the Peaceful River in Alaska

Location
- Country: United States of America
- State: Alaska
- Region: North America
- District: Aleutians West

Physical characteristics
- Source: North Pass
  - location: Attu Island, Aleutians West, United States of America
  - coordinates: 52°50′43″N 173°05′50″E
- Mouth: Pacific Ocean
  - location: Attu Station, Alaska, United States of America
  - coordinates: 52°49′31″N 173°10′56″E
  - elevation: 0 m (0 ft)
- Length: 8 km (5.0 mi)approx.

Basin features
- Tributaries
  - left: Hardy Creek

The Peaceful River is a remote stream located on the east side of Attu Island, Alaska that was named by the United States Army during its occupation of the island in World War II. The stream originates from its headwaters at North Pass and flows eastward from there, eventually crossing under Attu Airfield where shortly thereafter it discharges into the Pacific Ocean. The river is a known habitat for multiple bird and fish species native to Attu island. In 1983 a nest of black-backed wagtails was discovered under a dilapidated wooden bridge on the river. This, along with another nest discovered on Attu, represented the first successful nesting records for the subspecies in Alaska. The Peaceful River is also a known habitat for various species of salmon. A survey conducted on the island determined that pink salmon were the dominant species in the river with 33,042 fish being observed in the river. The survey also revealed that salmon productivity could increase if culverts are maintained and concrete debris is removed from the river.
