= La Villa River =

River in Panama

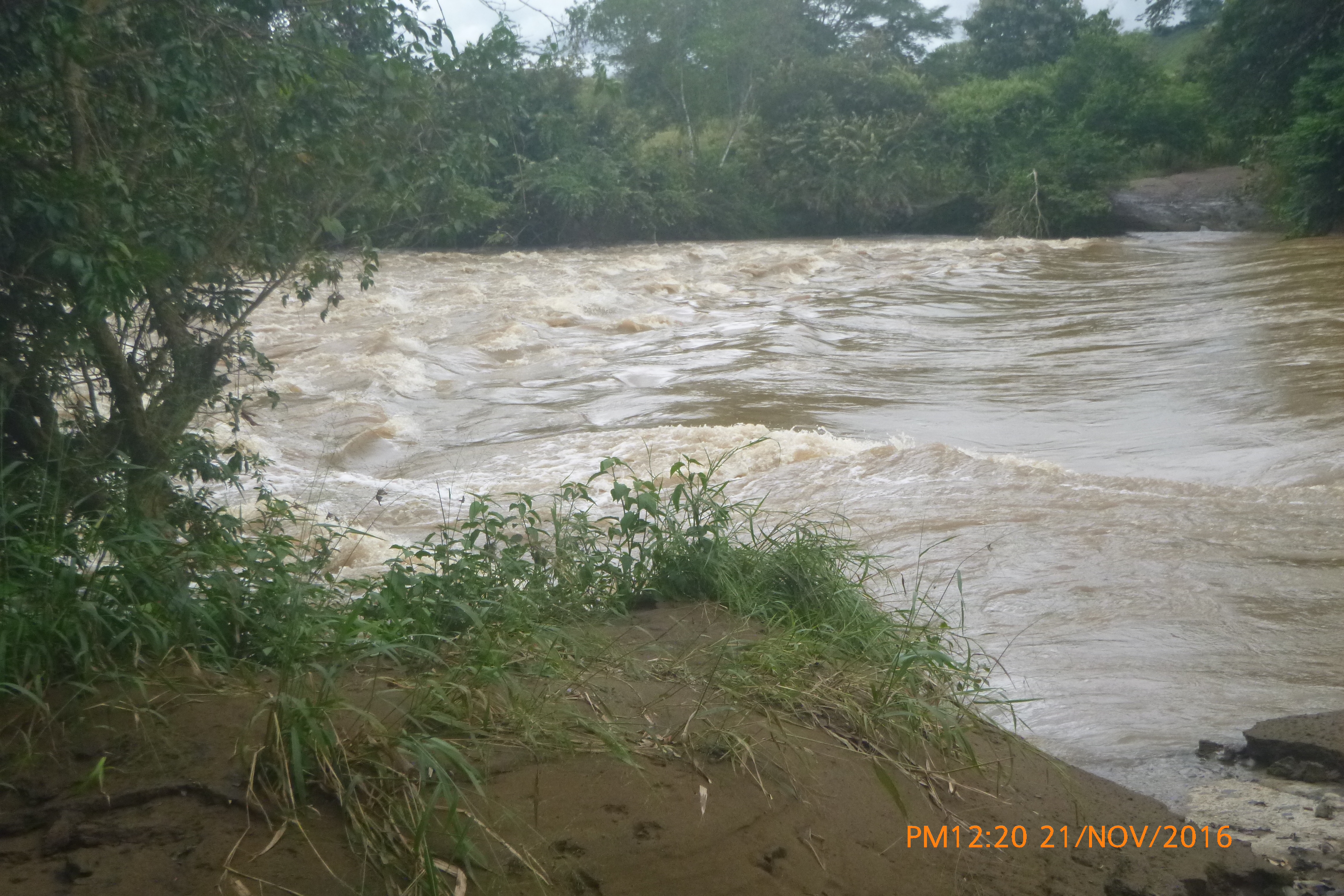

- Location of mouth

Location
- Country: Panama
- Province: Los Santos Province, Herrera Province

Physical characteristics
- Mouth
  - coordinates: 7°59′47″N 80°23′15″W
- Length: 150 km (93 mi)

La Villa River is a river of Panama, in the province of Los Santos in the peninsula of Azuero. It arises in the province of Herrera in a national park, the Montuoso. It forms the border between Herrera and Los Santos and is an important source of drinking water for both provinces. The water also is used for irrigation. The La Villa River is 150 kilometres (93 mi) long. La Villa de Los Santos is at the left edge of the river.

== See also ==
- List of rivers of Panama
