= Grande River (Panama) =

River in Panama

Grande River (Panama) Rio Grande
- Location of mouth

Location
- Country: Panama
- Province: Coclé Province

Physical characteristics
- Mouth
  - location: Gulf of Panama−Pacific Ocean
  - elevation: sea level

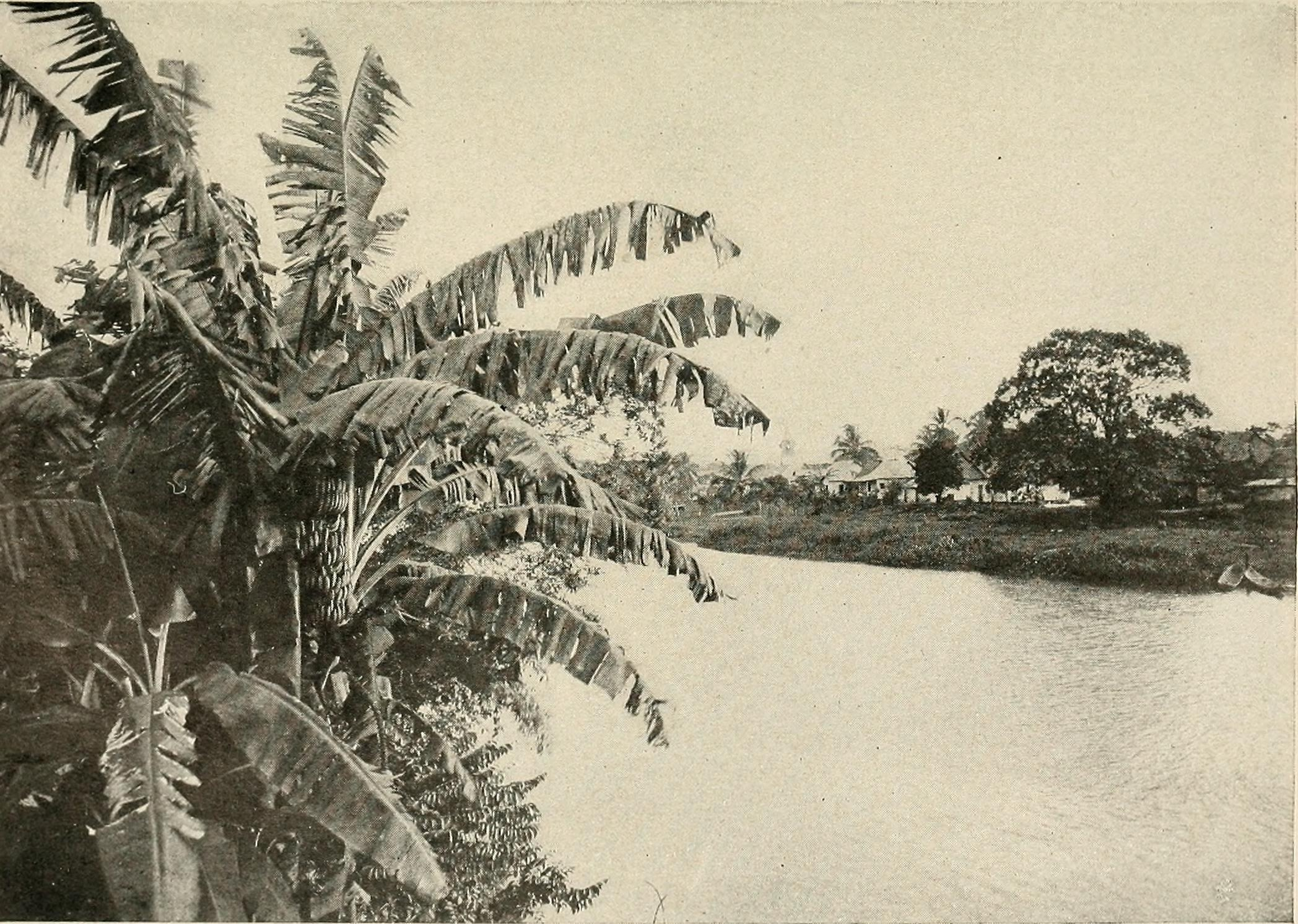

The Rio Grande (Panama) is a river in Coclé Province in Panama.

Its river mouth is at the Gulf of Panama on the Pacific Coast of Panama.

== See also ==
- Gulf of Panama topics
- List of rivers of Panama
- List of rivers of the Americas by coastline
