= San Pablo River (Panama) =

River in Panama

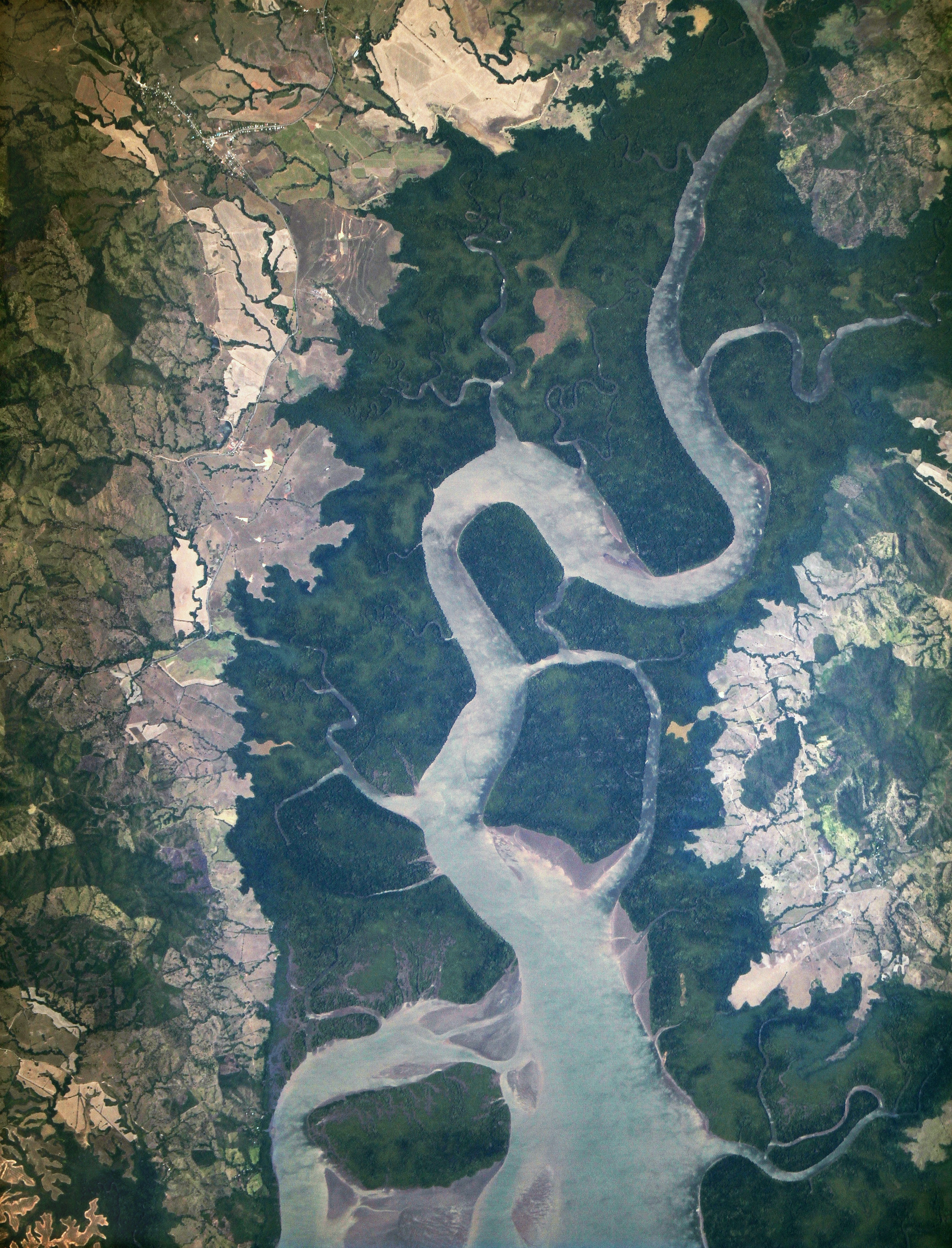
- Rio San Pablo

- Location of mouth
- Native name: Rio San Pablo (Spanish)

Location
- Country: Panama

Physical characteristics
- Mouth
  - location: Gulf of Montijo, Pacific Ocean
  - coordinates: 7°51′13″N 81°11′01″W

The San Pablo River (Panama) is a river of Panama. It feeds into the Gulf of Montijo.

== See also ==
- List of rivers of Panama
