= Sambú River =

River in Panama

- Location of mouth
- Native name: Rio Sambú (Spanish)

Location
- Country: Panama

Physical characteristics
- Mouth
  - coordinates: 8°04′59″N 78°17′50″W

The Sambú River is a river of Panama.

== See also ==
- List of rivers of Panama
