= Gulf of Parita =

Coordinates: 08°07′59″N 80°28′00″W

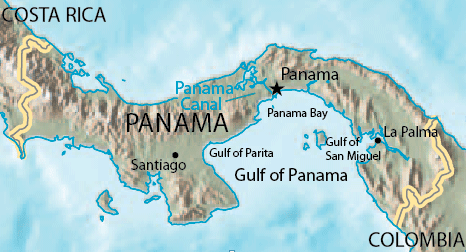
Gulf of Parita in the western Gulf of Panama

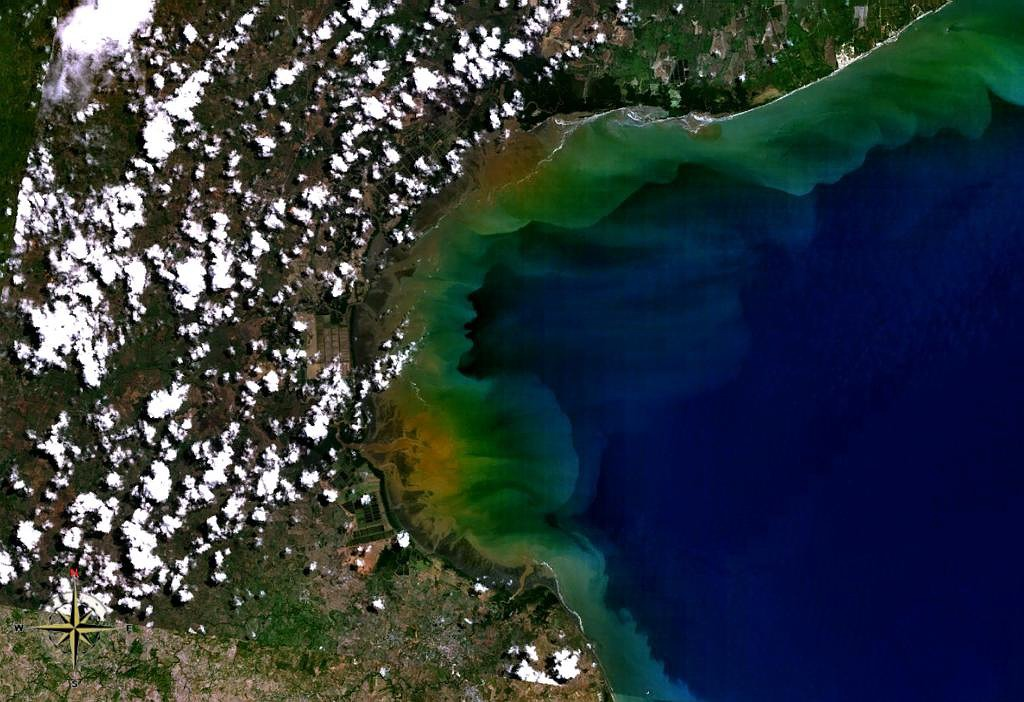
Gulf of Parita seen from space, showing extent of coastal mudflats

Gulf of Parita or Parita Bay (Spanish: Golfo de Parita, Bahía Parita) is a large gulf or bay off the coast of Herrera Province, in Panama. It forms the western section of the Gulf of Panama, and is located between Puerto Obaldia, Coclé and the mouth of the Rio Grande.

== Environment ==
The bay is the second most important site for migratory waders in Panama. A site encompassing some 15,000 ha of the bay’s tidal mudflats, as well as mangroves near the mouth of the Rio Grande, has been designated an Important Bird Area (IBA) by BirdLife International because it supports significant wintering populations of western sandpipers and short-billed dowitchers. Other wader species using the site include willet and Hudsonian whimbrel. It is also the only known breeding site for black-necked stilts in the country. American crocodiles are present.

== See also ==
- Gulf of Panama topics
- Panamanian coasts of the Pacific Ocean
