= Toabré River =

Location
- Country: Panama

The Toabré River is a river of Panama.

== See also ==
- List of rivers of Panama
