= Toabré, Burkina Faso =

Toabré
- Location in Burkina Faso
- Coordinates: 13°13′N 0°14′W
- Country: Burkina Faso
- Region: Est Region
- Province: Gnagna Province
- Department: Manni Department

Population (2019)
  - Total: 1,886

Toabré is a village in the Manni Department of Gnagna Province in eastern Burkina Faso.

Population
| Year | Pop. | ±% |
|---|---|---|
| 1985 | 633 | — |
| 2006 | 1,262 | +99.4% |
| 2019 | 1,886 | +49.4% |
