= David River (Panama) =

Location
- Country: Panama

The David River is a river of Panama, running through the Chiriquí Province. It is part of the hydrological system of the region and is a geographical feature surrounding the city of David.

== See also ==
- List of rivers of Panama
