= Calovebora River =

River in Panama

Rio Calovebora
- Location of mouth

Location
- Country: Panama

Physical characteristics
- Mouth
  - coordinates: 8.78794°N 81.212462°W

Rio Calovebora is a river on the Caribbean coast of Panama.

== See also ==
- List of rivers of Panama
