= Sabanas River =

- Location of mouth
- Native name: Rio Sabanas (Spanish)

Location
- Country: Panama

Physical characteristics
- Mouth
  - coordinates: 8°25′05″N 78°05′17″W

The Sabanas River is a river of Panama.

== See also ==
- List of rivers of Panama
