= Congo River (Panama) =

Location
- Country: Panama

The Congo River (Panama) is a river in Panama.

== See also ==
- List of rivers of Panama
