= Pacora River =

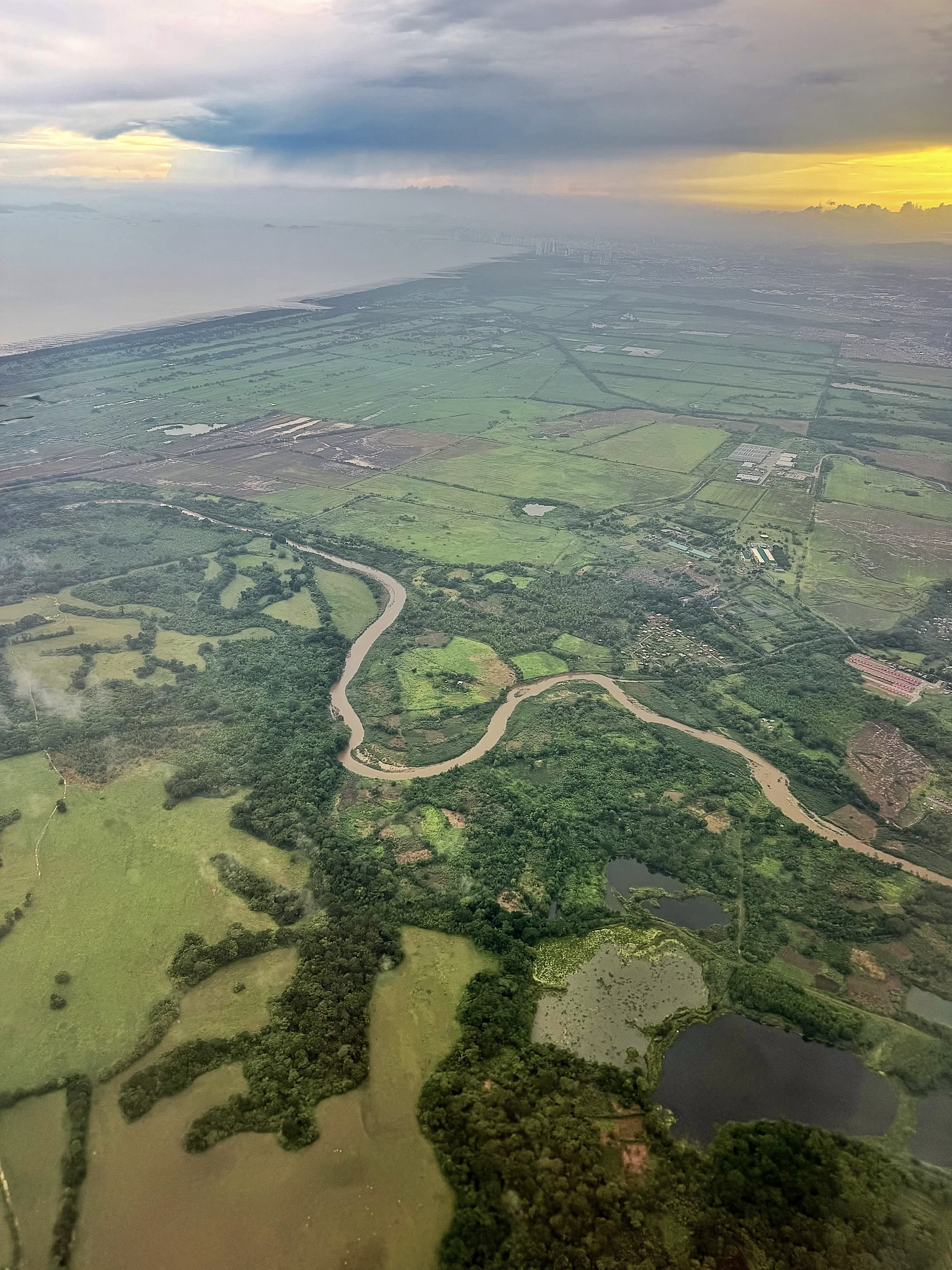
- Aerial view of the Pacora River

- Location of mouth

Location
- Country: Panama
- Province: Panamá Province
- District: Panamá District

Physical characteristics
- Source
  - location: Pacora and San Martín, Highlands of eastern Panamá Province
- Mouth
  - location: Bay of Panama
  - coordinates: 9°01′35″N 79°17′12″W
- Length: 48 km (30 mi)
- Basin size: 367.53 km^{2}
- Discharge
  - average: 11.1 m^{3}/s

The Pacora River (Spanish: Río Pacora) is a river in Panama, east of Panama City. It flows for 48 km through the eastern part of Panamá District before emptying into the Bay of Panama.

The basin supplies drinking water to several hundred thousand residents of eastern Panama City while also supporting agriculture, cattle ranching, and ecotourism.

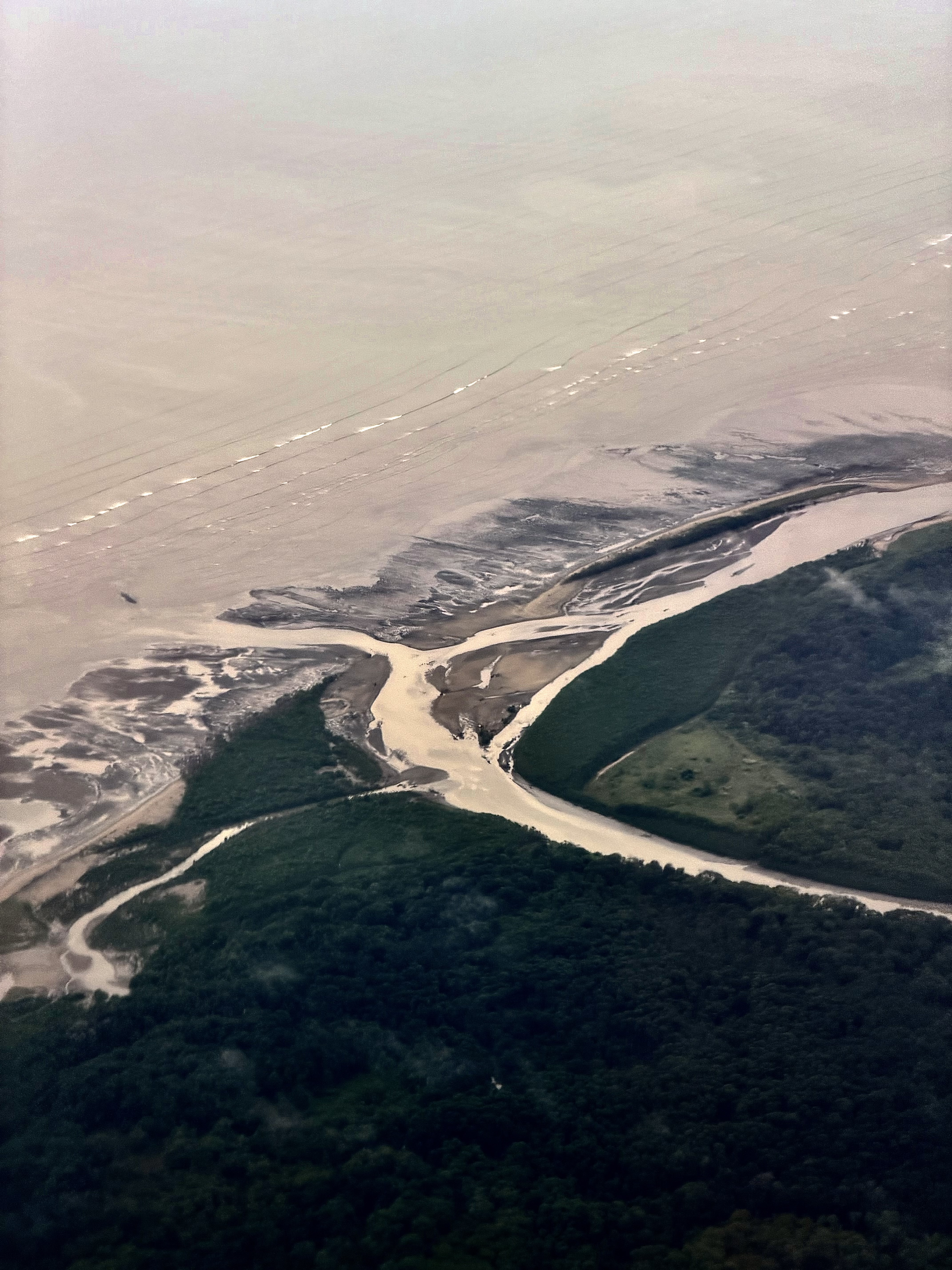
Mouth of the Pacora River

== Course ==
The Pacora rises in the hilly interior of eastern Panamá Province and flows generally southward toward the Pacific coast. Its main tributaries are the Tataré, Cabobré, Utivé, and Indio rivers. In its middle and upper reaches, the river passes through forested hills before opening out into the agricultural lowlands around the town of Pacora, continuing through the corregimientos of Pacora, San Martín, and Las Garzas, and finally reaching the Bay of Panama at the eastern edge of the Panama City metropolitan area.

== Hydrology and water quality ==
The Pacora basin receives approximately 2,750 mm of rainfall a year and the river carries an average flow of about 11.1 m^{3}/s, though this varies considerably between the rainy season (May–December) and the dry season.

== Ecology ==
The Pacora basin lies within eastern Panama's Pacific Slope and is represented by humid Eastern Panamanian montane forests, premontane humid forest, and tropical humid forest life zones. A 2020–2021 icthyological survey of the river recorded specimens of the vulnerable, range-restricted cichlid species like Isthmoheros tuyrensis in the middle and lower basin, extending the species' known distribution roughly 20 km west of previously recorded localities in the Bayano River basin. The Pacora is the only urban river basin in the Pacific side of Central America known to support a population of this species.

The same survey found the river's forest cover averaged about 53% along its course, rising to as much as 90% in the upper basin, and identified the river as also supporting the more widespread cichlid Andinoacara coeruleopunctatus alongside introduced Nile tilapia. A Geographic information system (GIS) land-use study from 1992 to 2019 found that deforestation from cattle pasture was the largest land-cover change in the basin, with the greatest losses of forest occurring between 2009 and 2019. The basin's urban footprint grew roughly tenfold over the same period, from about 260 hectares to more than 2,400 hectares.

== History ==
The river, town, and lower valley of Pacora take their name from the abundance of a native palm known locally as the pácora. The area is among the oldest continuously settled communities in Panama. In the early 1580s a community of several hundred formerly enslaved Africans, led by the maroon leader Antón Mandinga, settled along the river after reaching a peace agreement with Spanish colonial authorities in 1581, following years of conflict in the nearby Bayano region, named after Bayano.

A Spanish colonial-era account of the area described a river descending from nearby mountains through Spanish-owned farms growing citrus, figs, pineapples, plantains, guavas, and avocados. The settlement of Pacora was formally established on May 30, 1582, and its parish church, dedicated to the Immaculate Conception, was built in 1791. During the nineteenth century, under the union with Gran Colombia and later Colombia, Pacora was organized as its own district of fertile plains noted for cattle and horse raising, before being downgraded to a corregimiento of Panamá District by Ordinance 23 of 1892. The modern corregimiento of Pacora, one of eleven within Panamá District, was constituted in its present form on July 20, 1927.

== Human use and environmental pressures ==
The Pacora is one of Panama's officially designated priority river basins because of its role as a source of drinking water for the eastern side of the Panama City metropolitan area, treated at facilities including the Centenario plant in Pacora. A 2026 legislative field visit by the National Assembly's Population, Environment, and Development Commission reported that nearly 400,000 people depend heavily on water from the basin, and highlighted pollution from pig farms and untreated waste in communities such as Las Garzas, San Martín, and San Miguel as an emerging threat comparable to earlier contamination problems linked to swine farming in the Azuero Peninsula.

Local communities have also raised concerns over the informal extraction of sand and gravel from the riverbed. The river's beaches, natural pools, waterfalls, and whitewater stretches near the town of San Miguel are used for swimming, tubing, and recreational kayaking. Its ecotourism potential has been recognized in the Panama City Resilience Strategy, which recommends training local tour guides and promoting the basin's biodiversity as a source of income for nearby communities. A 2008 European Union-funded management plan for the basin, developed under the PREVDA regional program, has not been renewed or replaced by a current integrated management plan for the river.

== See also ==
- List of rivers of Panama
- Cueva people
