= Jalponga River =

River in El Salvador

- Location of mouth
- Native name: Rio Jalponga (Spanish)

Location
- Country: El Salvador
- Department: La Paz

Physical characteristics
- Mouth
  - coordinates: 13°22′00″N 88°57′00″W

Jalponga River is a river in La Paz Department, El Salvador.
