= Copinula River =

River in El Salvador

Copinula
- Location of mouth
- Native name: Rio Copinula (Spanish)

Location
- Country: El Salvador

Physical characteristics
- Source
  - location: Sonsonate
  - coordinates: 13°40′50″N 89°50′12″W
- Mouth
  - location: Sonsonate
  - coordinates: 13°37′57″N 89°50′36″W

Copinula River (Rio Copinula) is a medium stream in the Sonsonate department of El Salvador, which has moderate to large quantities of fresh water year round, especially from early May through October.

A stream with a similar name, Copinulapa River (Rio Copinulapa), is also located in El Salvador, near the municipality of Nombre de Jesús in the Chalatenango department. This stream is a tributary of the Lempa River at 14°00′06″N 88°42′36″W.
