= Chepo River =

River in Panama

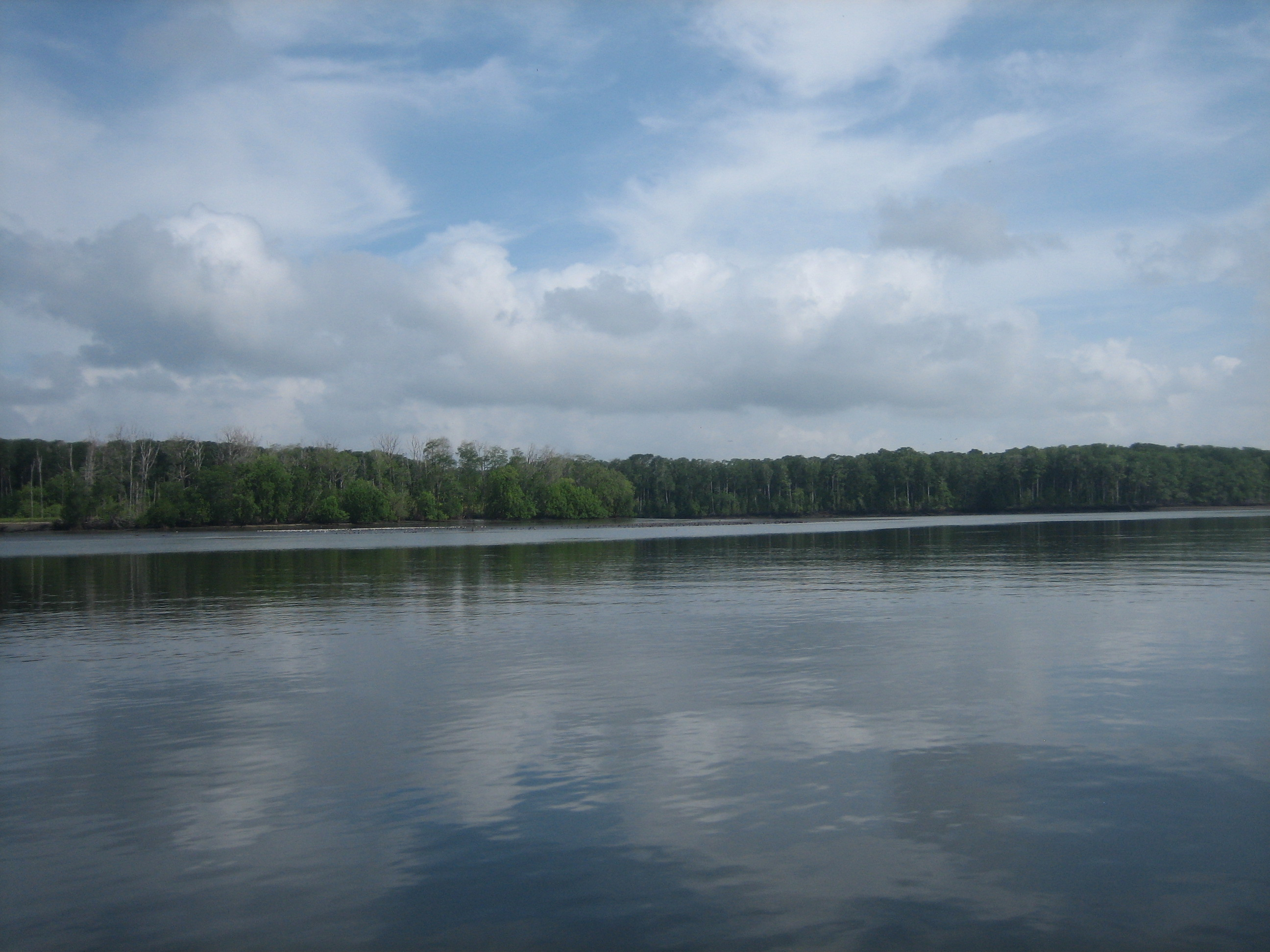

- Location of mouth

Location
- Country: Panama

Physical characteristics
- Mouth
  - coordinates: 8°59′53″N 79°06′49″W

The Chepo River is a river of Panama in the Chepo District of Panama Province. It drains into the Pacific Ocean.

== Course ==
The uppermost reaches of the Chepo are alternately called the Bayano River after the construction of the Bayano Dam that resulted in the 350-square-kilometre (140 mi^{2}) lake reservoir. The headwaters of the Chepo encompass watercourses running south from the San Blas Range near the Caribbean along with other rivers draining parts of the Majé and Darien Mountains.

The Mamoni River is a major tributary farther downstream.

Measuring 206 kilometres (128 mi) in length, the Chepo-Bayano is the third longest river of Panama.

Coquira, in the lower reaches, is the main riverine port.

== See also ==
- List of rivers of Panama
