= Sirama River =

River in El Salvador

- Location of mouth
- Native name: Rio Sirama (Spanish)

Location
- Country: El Salvador
- District: La Unión Department

Physical characteristics
- Mouth
  - coordinates: 13°27′34″N 87°47′52″W

Sirama River is a river of El Salvador.
