= Pululuya River =

River in El Salvador

- Location of mouth
- Native name: Rio Pululuva (Spanish)

Location
- Country: El Salvador
- District: Sonsonate

Physical characteristics
- Mouth
  - location: Pacific Ocean
  - coordinates: 13°33′N 89°42′W

Pululuya River (Spanish: Rio Pululuya) is a river located in the southern part of the Sonsonate Department of El Salvador. Precipitations along the river are suitable for municipal water, irrigation, and water wells.
