= Sensunapan River =

River in El Salvador

- Location of mouth
- Native name: Río Sensunapán (Spanish)

Location
- Country: El Salvador
- District: Sonsonate

Physical characteristics
- Mouth
  - location: Pacific Ocean
  - coordinates: 13°35′54″N 89°50′15″W
  - elevation: Sea level

Sensunapan River is a river in Sonsonate District, El Salvador.
