= Banderas River =

River in El Salvador

- Location of mouth
- Native name: Rio Banderas (Spanish)

Location
- Country: El Salvador
- Department: Ahuachapán, Sonsonate

Physical characteristics
- Mouth
  - coordinates: 13°32′N 89°43′W

Banderas River (Spanish: Rio Banderas) is a river located in the southern part of the Ahuachapán Department of El Salvador. Precipitations along the river are suitable for municipal water, irrigation, and water wells.
