= List of rivers of Costa Rica =

This is a list of rivers in Costa Rica.

== By drainage basin ==
This list is arranged by drainage basin, with respective tributaries indented under each larger stream's name.

=== Caribbean Sea ===
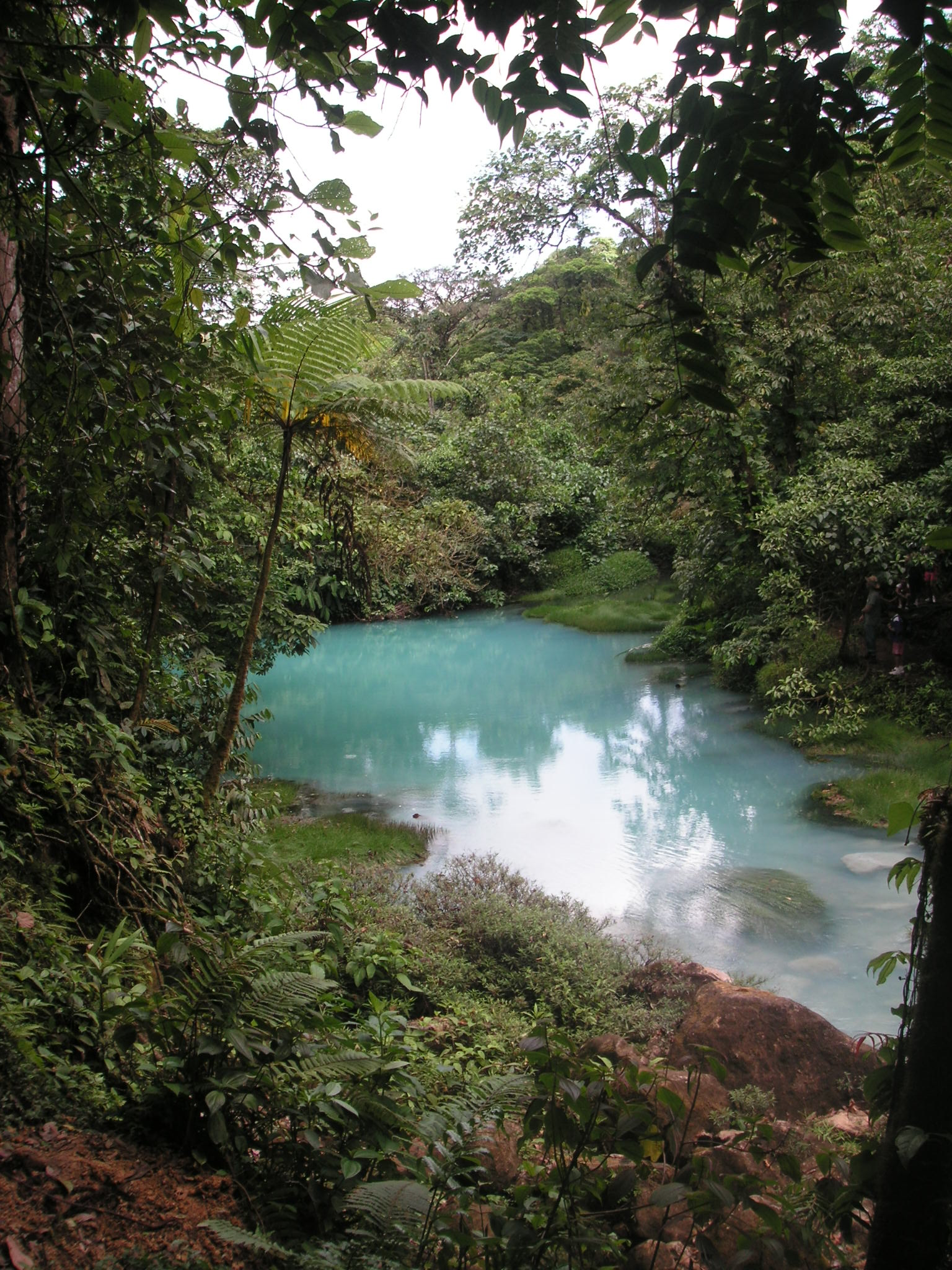
The Rio Celeste (sky blue river) at Tenorio Volcano National Park in Costa Rica.

- San Juan River
  - Colorado River (distributary)
    - Chirripó River
  - Sarapiquí River
    - Toro River
    - Sucio River
  - San Carlos River
    - Arenal River
  - Pocosol River
  - Lake Nicaragua (Nicaragua)
    - Frío River
      - Sabogal River
      - Celeste River (Buenavista River)
    - Zapote River
    - Niño River (Pizote River)
    - Sapoá River
- Suerte River
- Tortuguero River
- Reventazón River
  - Parismina River
    - Jiménez River
  - Atirro River
  - Pejibaye River
  - Orosí River
- Pacuare River
- Matina River
  - Chirripó Duchi River (Chirripó Atlañtico River)
- Banano River
- Estrella River
- Sixaola River
  - Yorkin River
  - Uren River
  - Lari River
  - Coen River
  - Telire River

=== Pacific Ocean ===
- Tamarindo River
- Nosara River
- Tempisque River
  - Bebedero River
    - Cañas River
    - Piedras River
    - Corobicí River
      - Tenorio River
  - Cañas River
  - Salto River
  - Liberia River
  - Colorado River
- Abangares River
- Lagarto River
- Guacimal River
- Aranjuez River
- Barranca River
- Jesús María River
- Tárcoles River
- Pirris River
- Naranjo River
- Savegre River
- Térraba River
  - Coto Brus River
  - General River
    - Chirripó Pacifico River
- Sierpe River
- Coto Colorado River
- Río Ceibo
- Chacuaco River
- Claro River (Costa Rica)
- Colón River
- Conte River
- Diamante River (Costa Rica)
- Jaba River (Costa Rica)
- La Palma River
- Limón River (Costa Rica)
- Negro River (Costa Rica)
- Rincón River
- Riyito River (Costa Rica)
- Síngrí River
- Tigre River (Costa Rica)
- Volcán River

== See also ==
- Water resources management in Costa Rica
- List of rivers of the Americas by coastline
