= Tenorio =

Tenorio or Tenório is a surname of Spanish origin and may refer to:

== People ==
- Tenorio (surname)
- Tenorio, pseudonym of French writer Antoine Blondin

== Places ==
- Tenório, municipality in the state of Paraíba in Brazil
- Tenorio River, river in Costa Rica
- Tenorio Rock, rock in Antarctica
- Tenorio Volcano, volcano in Costa Rica

== Other ==
- Don Juan Tenorio, an 1844 play written by José Zorrilla
