= Cañas River =

Cañas River may refer to:

- Cañas River (Mexico)
- Cañas River (Bebedero River tributary), in Costa Rica and Nicaragua
- Cañas River (Juana Diaz, Puerto Rico)
- Cañas River (Mayagüez, Puerto Rico)
- Cañas River (Naranjito, Puerto Rico)
- Cañas River (Ponce, Puerto Rico)
- Cañas River (Sabana Grande, Puerto Rico)
- Cañas River (Tempisque River tributary)

== See also ==
- Canas (disambiguation)
- Canoas River (disambiguation)
- Río Cañas (disambiguation)
