= Canas =

Canas or Cañas may refer to:

== Places ==
- Canas (Lycia), a town of ancient Lycia, now in Turkey
- Canas province, Peru
- Canas, Ponce, Puerto Rico
  - Canas Urbano
- Canas, São Paulo, Brazil
- Canas de Senhorim, Nelas, Portugal
- Cañas (canton), Guanacaste province, Costa Rica
- Cañas, La Rioja, Spain
- Cañas, Los Santos, Panama
- Villar de Cañas, Cuenca, Spain
- Cannes (Occitan: Canas), France
- Amatlán de Cañas, Nayarit, Mexico

== Other uses ==
- Cañas (surname)
- Cañas River (disambiguation)
