= Hurricane children =

Characters from Talamancan mythology

The hurricane children are characters from Talamancan mythology of the Bribri and Cabécar, indigenous peoples of the southern Caribbean part of Costa Rica. They are children of the family of thunder, Talá Yakela and his wife Ágata, the first family that Sibö, the major deity of the Bribri, formed to live on earth. They are playful children whose voices were heard like thunder. They ran in circular form from right to left at high speeds that unleashed winds, until completing their game. In Bribri mythology they are responsible for unleashing the storms, hurricanes and winds.

== Names ==
The four hurricane children are the following:

- Óbena: He is the firstborn of the thunder family. He guides his brothers, the hurricane children, to hide from Itsö the day he ate his mother Agata, after deceiving them by helping them with firewood.
- Able: The second brother of hurricane children. His participation in history is very discreet, nothing different from his other brothers is detailed.
- Dilé: The third brother. He accompanies Óbena to collect firewood the day Itsö killed and devoured his mother Agata.
- Sérike or Yaba Bataskú: The youngest of the brothers. He stands out for being the most naughty of the hurricane children. He caresses and breaks the clouds to create downpours. It is he who gives the idea of taking revenge on Sakabiali after she killed their mother.

== Myths ==
=== Itsö ate Ágata ===
The stories tell that one day Itsö ate Ágata, Talá Yakela's wife, whom he devoured little by little. Ágata was pregnant with Sérike, the hurricane. Yakela would go out and hunt the evil spirits, everything that represents the negative energies monsters and snakes. Ágata was always alone with her children in the house while her husband was out hunting. One day, he gathered his whole family and told them to stay in the house and not to go outside because there were many evil spirits around the palenque and they would be in danger.

One day, Dilé and Óbena went out to look for firewood, because they had run out. They met Itsö, who did them the favor of cutting and loading them with firewood. In gratitude, they let Itsö rest for a while in their house and chat with them. He claimed to be an awapa (shaman), so he checks Agata to remove the lice from her hair. However, this was only an excuse to suck Ágata's blood and flesh, leaving only the skeleton where Serike's fetus was restless, moving from side to side. When Dilé and Óbena saw what had happened, they hid, immobile and nervous, climbing a tree while Itsö tried to climb to eat them, sucking the wind to pull them. Afterwards, exhausted and without achieving his goal, he left for his home. One day later Talá Yakela returns home, and upon seeing what happened, he patiently collected fibers from tree bark and medicinal leaves. With these precious materials he managed to reconstitute all the parts of Ágata's body, so she could give birth to Sérike .

The next day, Talá Yakela took his blowgun and fired at the immense sea, where Itsö slept, which was covered with black clouds. He decides to go to Talá Yakela's house, where he was surprised to see Ágata alive, and even more beautiful. There, they forced him to dig a hole in the ground and light a fire in which he was caught in the middle of the hot stones and roasted to death. Talá Yakela emptied mud, water and clay into the campfire and steam sprouted, from one eye of Itsö, a beautiful butterfly with owl eyes that fluttered with its wings, and from the other eye a beautiful owl flew out, calling jööüü, jööüü, singing in fright. The moral of the story is that the good and the bad are preserved within each person or animal.

=== Story of the Sun Lord and the Hurricane Children ===
Every day the Sun Lord goes to bed very tired, for his great work. As soon as the Sun Lord begins to appear and show the first rays, the Hurricane Children begin to look for it to lift it, because it always costs a lot, turns and covers with the clouds up, but the Hurricane Children always find it, and the first to see it is always the youngest, Yaba Batásku Sérike. Together they grab and stretch the whiskers (which are those first rays of light in the morning), and so they finish lifting it, every day.

=== Hurricane Children and Sakabiali ===
Sibö needed the help of a brave, strong, responsible person with authority to be a leader who made decisions and who was in charge of ruling on earth; So he chose Talá Yakela, father of the Hurricane Children. Ágata, their mother, was in charge of the duties of the home and caring for the children. They listened to multiple stories of their uncle Olóbasá, who told in each of them the importance of staying together in the house of not going out at night, loving, caring and protecting the works of Sibö. Due to their great curiosity, the Hurricane Children escape from their home to know the world; This is why his mother searches for them for a long time without any success and decides to continue with his work.

On their trip around the world, the children meet the Sun Lord, who is their uncle and who as such advises them to stop playing so much and to return home to their mother's side; however, the children stay playing for a few more days and then make the decision to return. When the Hurricane Children return home they do not find their mother, but discover a handful of bones. At that time the children heard an echo that comes from the skeleton and was similar to the voice of their mother. Ágata, through the echo, expresses to her children the sadness she felt for his abandonment and disobedience; but he also tells them how happy she feels to have them back at home and asks them as her last advice, to be good, obedient, kind and respectful children.

The children asked their mother's skeleton about what happened, to which the voice answered meticulously that the person who killed her is Sakabiali, the lady of the mountain, who made her run behind a deer through all the paths, hillsides and mountains, up and down, barking like a dog all day until sunset, until in a well-squeezed passage she waited for her and hit her with a piece of stick and then sucked all her blood and ate all her flesh.

After the children heard the story they left in search of Sakabiali. She was hidden in a huge lagoon in a place called Janeu, by the Telire river basin, in Talamanca. Upon arrival, the children found the Dululba snake, responsible for devouring all those who commit incest. They decided to play for a while, and afterwards, one of the children remembered that Sakabiali liked spicy chili peppers. They put a piece on a hook and managed to lure her out.

The lady of the mountain confessed that she killed their mother because nobody took care of her, and she was very hungry; so the children convince her to show them how she killed her, tricking her and killing her in the same way she killed her mother.

Once the children leave, they find their uncle again, Lord Sun and he rebukes them for their actions and advises them to learn to live together and practice good deeds; To obey the rules of the family and not destroy.

== Bibliography ==
- Jara Murillo, Carla Victoria: Diccionario de Mitología Bribri (1st edition). San José. CR EUCR. ISBN 978-9977-67-738-5.
- Jara, CV (1997). The place of time. Stories and other oral traditions of the Bribri people. San José, Costa Rica. Editorial of the University of Costa Rica. Rodrigo Facio University City.
