= Káchabuké =

Character from Talamancan mythology

Káchabuké (literally "achiote [red] frog") is a character from Talamancan mythology. It is a frog that Sibö involves in the creation of the magical Duluítami tree, which gives rise to the sea and other water sources.

== Myth ==
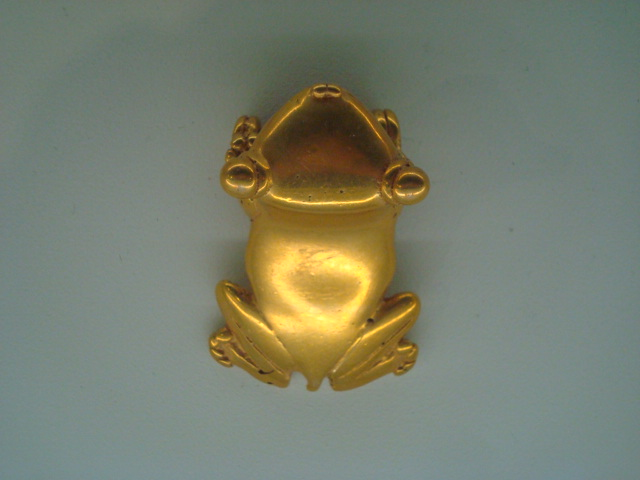
Gold pendant in the shape of a frog. c. 700-1550 CE. Currently in the Museo del Oro Precolombino, San José, Costa Rica.

After the death of Bulumia, Sibö wrapped her body in bijagua leaves and brought it to the ground. Upon arrival, Sibö searched for an assistant to take care of Bulumia's corpse.

He found Káchabuké the poisonous frog and placed him on her belly. Sibö told him to stand guard over the body of Bulumia for four days and not to move from there. Sibö said that if anything happened to the body it would be Káchabuké's responsibility. The frog felt proud to be the one chosen to take care of the corpse, but he could not sleep well at night because the noise coming from the belly was similar to ocean waves, and his loneliness caused him to become frightened. The days passed and Káchabuké had not eaten anything which caused him great hunger. Sibö sent a bumblebee for the frog to catch and eat, but he could not catch it. The bumblebee collided with some trees and landed, and the frog rushed to catch it. As soon as he jumped, Káchabuké heard a wind and ran back to the corpse, but he was too late; the belly was detached from the corpse and the fetus, a small tree called Duluítami, had emerged.

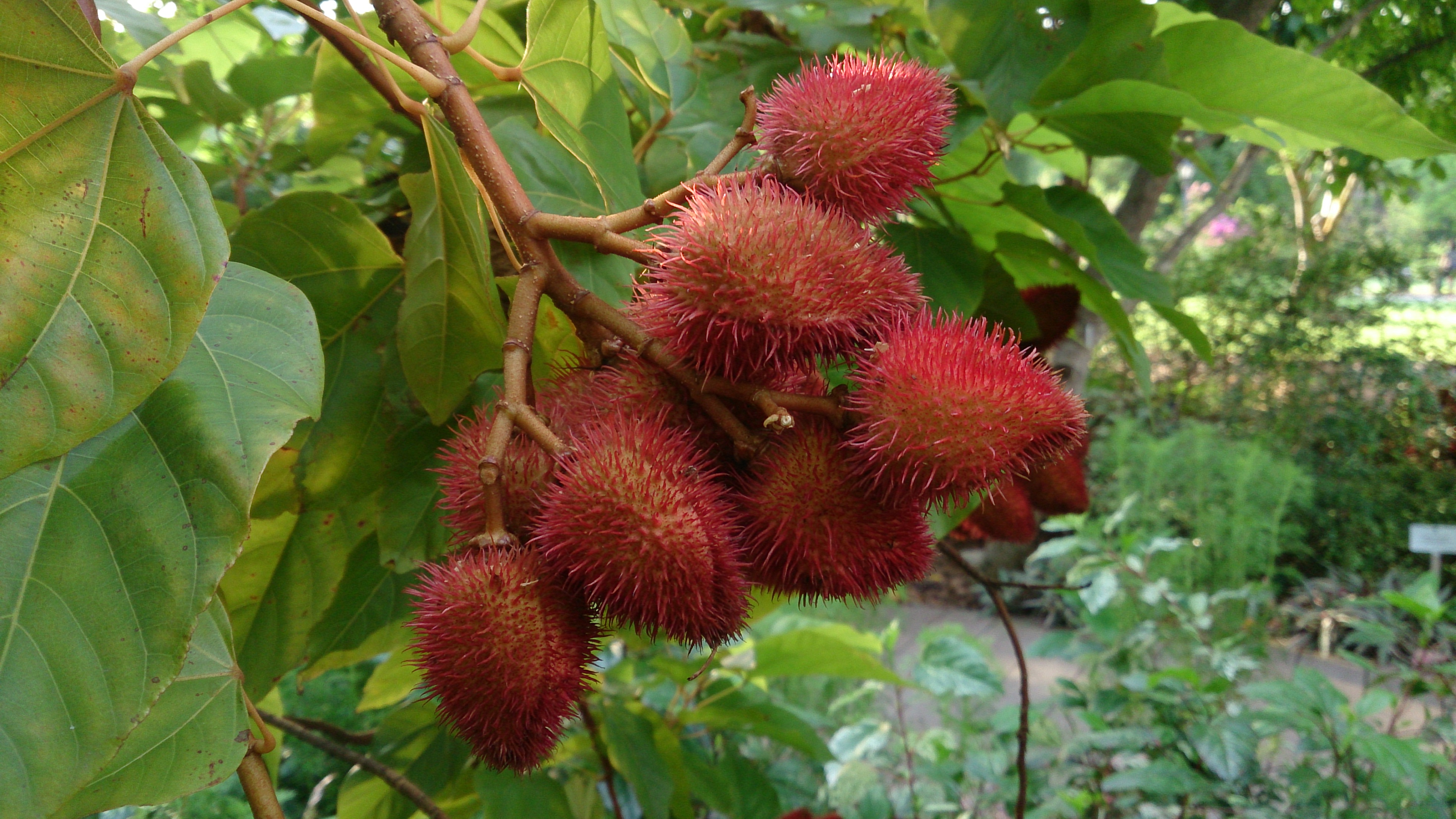
Achiote fruits (Bixa orellana)

The next day Sibö came looking for the little frog and Duluítami was playing. Sibö said "Why did not you do what I told you?" The frog explained that he was very hungry and tried to grab the bumblebee. To punish Káchabuké, Sibö placed him in a tree and turned him into the achiote fruit (Bixa orellana).

== Bibliography ==
- Fernández, Severiano (2011). El banquete de Sibo. Limón. Fundación Naíri.
