= Río Cañas (disambiguation) =

Río Cañas is a river in Ponce, Puerto Rico. It is a tributary of the Río Matilde.

Río Cañas may also refer to:

== Rivers ==
- Río Cañas (Aguada, Puerto Rico), a tributary of the Río Culebrinas
- Río Cañas (Caguas, Puerto Rico), a tributary of the Río Grande de Loiza
- Río Cañas (Juana Diaz, Puerto Rico), a river reaching the Caribbean Sea
- Río Cañas (Mayagüez, Puerto Rico), a tributary of the Río Grande de Añasco
- Río Cañas (Naranjito, Puerto Rico), a tributary of the Río de la Plata
- Río Cañas (Sabana Grande, Puerto Rico), a tributary of the Río Loco

== Places ==
- Río Cañas, Añasco, Puerto Rico, a barrio
- Río Cañas, Caguas, Puerto Rico, a barrio
- Río Cañas, Las Marías, Puerto Rico, a barrio
- Río Cañas Abajo, Juana Díaz, Puerto Rico, a barrio
- Río Cañas Abajo, Mayagüez, Puerto Rico, a barrio
- Río Cañas Arriba, Juana Díaz, Puerto Rico, a barrio
- Río Cañas Arriba, Mayagüez, Puerto Rico, a barrio

== See also ==
- Cañas River (disambiguation)
- Canoas River (disambiguation)
