= Dechibeta Hot Springs =

Dechibeta Hot Springs are hot springs in the Cabecar people's indigenous territory at Valle de la Estrella, Talamanca Range, a province of Limón, Costa Rica. Its approximate geographical location is at 9°43′43.57″N 83°9′20.00″W. Hot springs found here reach temperatures of 55 degrees Celsius in some points.

Little biological research has been done in this area where North American and South American flora overlaps.
