= Corobicí River =

River in Costa Rica

The Corobicí River, or the Rio Corobicí, in Costa Rica is a tributary of the Tempisque River. Originating from the southern slopes of the Tenorio Volcano in the Guanacaste Mountains, the river flows southerly, descending through tropical dry forest and pastures before joining the Tenorio River which winds its way to the Bebedero River and the Tempisque among the mangroves.

Rafting is a tourist attraction on the Corobicí.
