= Suerte =

Suerte is Spanish for "luck".

It may refer to:

- Suerte River, a river in Costa Rica
- Señor Suerte, alias used by Marvel comic characters

== Songs ==
- "Whenever, Wherever" (Suerte), Spanish version of the 2001 Shakira song
- "Lucky" (Jason Mraz and Colbie Caillat song) (Suerte), a Spanish version of the 2009 song by Jason Mraz featuring Ximena Sariñana
- "Suerte", a 2012 single by Paty Cantú from Corazón Bipolar
