= Piedras River =

Piedras River may refer to:

- Piedras River (San Juan, Puerto Rico)
- Piedras River (Utuado, Puerto Rico)
- Piedras River (Costa Rica)
- Piedras River (Peru)
