= Talamancan mythology =

Talamancan mythology includes the traditional beliefs of the Bribri and Cabécar peoples, two groups of indigenous peoples in Costa Rica living in the Talamanca region. These peoples speak two different but closely related languages, and from a cultural point of view, constitute a single community. With some exceptions, they share the same religious beliefs, the same stories, the same ritual songs, etc.

== Mythological figures ==
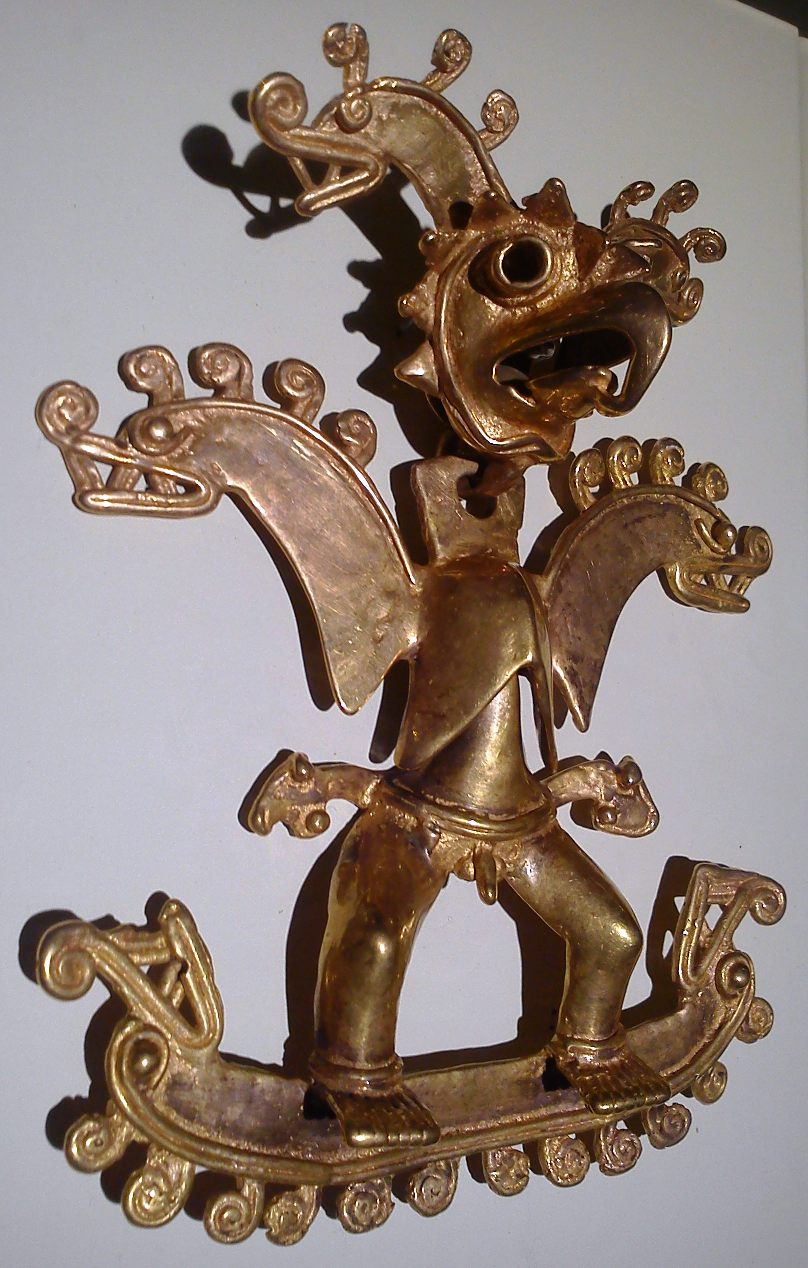
Gold figure of Sibú with head of an eagle. Pre-Columbian Gold Museum, San José, Costa Rica.

- Sibú or Sibö - primary deity, creator of the Earth and humans, Wak (owner/guardian) of the indigenous people.
- Shulákama or Shula'kma - King of the Serpents. Venomous snakes are considered his arrows.
- Itso' - helper or peón of Sibú
- Sórkura or SórkuLa - grandfather (in some sources, grand-uncle) of Sibú
- Sìitami - mother of Sibú
- Sibökõmõ - father of Sibú
- Nãmãitãmĩ, also called Tapir - Sibú's sister, mother of Irìria
- Irìria, also called Sulára, la Niña Tierra, or tapir girl - Sibú's niece
- Sulá - father of Irìria, lord of the underworld
- Bikakra - grandmother of Irìria
- Tsuru' - Sibú's wife, goddess of cacao
- Bulumia - Sibú's cousin, wife of Shulákama
- Sérke - Wak of the Animals, personification of the wind
- Duarö - servant of Sérke, who protects animals if people kill unnecessarily
- MnuLtmi, also Duluitami - female personification of the Sea
- ChbekoL - a giant snake that ate people who broke the laws against incest
- Dukur Bulú - vampire bat who helped Sibú' create humans
- Káchabuké - a poisonous frog
- Hurricane Children
- Talá Yekela - god of thunder, father of the Hurricane Children
- Dalàbulu - sun god
- Dìnamu - aquatic feline monster that eats people trying to cross a river

== History of the Earth ==
At first, conditions were not favorable for life, since the world was made of pure stone and there was no soil. In addition, animals at that time were like human beings today. One day, Dukur Bulú, a bat that lived in Sibö's house, defecated inside the house. From the excrement were instantly born beautiful girls. Sibö, astonished, asked Dukur Bulú why this had happened. He replied that he sucked the blood of Iriria the Earth Girl, the daughter of Sulá and Nãmãitãmĩ, who lived in the underworld with her mother and grandmother Makeur Siau. Sibö planned to hold a party to fool Nãmãitãmĩ, inviting her and her daughter, and to capture Iriria so he could create the Earth.

One day, Sibö arrived where her mother, surprised by the appearance of Sibö (since she had previously told her mother Makeur Siau that she dreamed of this arrival of the Lord) asked her why she was visiting, Sibö answered that there was going to be a big party and that he came to ask for her help to collect and serve chocolate. Nãmãitãmĩ refused until Sibö convinced her that he was going to marry her to some men. After a while Nãmãitãmĩ went with Sibö; then, suddenly a thunder sent by Talá Yekela ordered by Sibö to destroy the sanctuary, and knowing that Nãmãitãmĩ had been deceived, runs to Sibö's house in the west; but when it arrives, Iriria lay dead. Nãmãitãmĩ cried while looking upon her dead daughter and from her tears many species came to be. Finally, there was a grand opening party, since Sibö takes the Child to the world and through a ceremony, it becomes a substance that was watered throughout the house, that is to say the planet and thus the Earth was created to sow and to harvest our food from it.

== History of the Sea ==
Sibö brought the corn kernels from under the Earth, which the indigenous people considered the first human beings. At that time Sibö made the land with the help of his different friends. The Earth was made of very strong stone from the bedrock, so that it would last for a long time. The land had many valleys and hills but almost no vegetation.

There were no rivers or lagoons like today, so the Sea did not exist. At that moment something special happened in the land, there was a medium tree that became a woman and a tree, it was almost never in the same place. Sometimes the voice of the tree was heard: "You who pass and look towards me, I am the Sea, I am the supporter of life and my fruits will satisfy hunger, I am a tree, I am wood to build your house, I am part of the green book, my leaves give off messages of love...".

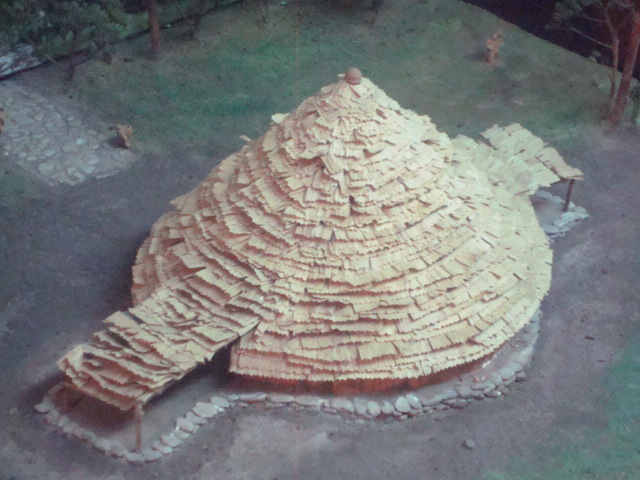
Model of a palenque in the Museo Nacional de Costa Rica.

Sibö, curious about the tree's behavior, followed the tree and realized that she was the daughter of a woman who became pregnant without the consent of her family. They did not want the child to be born, so she had to give birth far away on a mountain. Since she was not welcome, she decided to become a tree. When the girl was born, the mother called her: Bulumia. She was Sibö's first cousin and her hair grew to her feet. When she was an adult she lived alone beyond the Earth, in a conical house made in a circle. She was happy in her palenque (dwelling) and in the mornings she sang, danced and saw the sky and the Sun Lord. It was very hot and this caused Bulumia to release a lot of sweat, flooding her palenque.

One day, Sibö said: "The Earth will be barren, desolate and very sad if nothing is done..." and his idea of creating it was to multiply the seeds of the men of corn, then Sibö said: "I have to do something, to turn the world into something wonderful." Sibö looked at the loneliness in which Bulumia lived and said: "Hello, cousin! What are you doing? Would you like to have a man for good company? It would be great!". Lady Bulumia said: "No, no, no". Sibö said to her: "We are going to take a walk in the Universe and maybe you will find a man that you like". She said: "Here where I live there is no one, and if I had I would not join with anyone, only with you". Sibö told her: "I can not marry you because you are my cousin," and worried about seeing her alone, he would go looking for a companion for her.

At last Sibö decided to visit a young lady named Jútsini at his palenque. She went to the toilet and they both greeted each other. He asked if she had already decided to have a companion and she asked him what that man was like. Sibö told her that he was identical to her but with different genitals. She did not want to have company, she wanted to remain free. Sibö visited the palenque several times to insist that she must have a partner, until he convinced her. She wanted to meet her new partner, so Sibö and the lady fasted two days and climbed the whole hill and went to infinity in the middle of the Universe to look for the house of Shulákama, the King of Serpents. When they arrived at the palenque of the Lord they were badly treated. Shulákama said to them: "I am fasting and dieting because I realized that you, Sibö, are going to make many Ditsa appear that are the little seeds of the men of corn, and all that will be mine."

"Also, you bring me bad energy, go away and come back from where you came from, I do not want anyone in my house, except a woman." And they left but Sibö kept insisting to Shulakama: "What do you think about having a housemate? How fascinating it would be if you had a wife like Bulumia!" Shulákama's mood softened and he accepted, apologizing to Bulumia for the uncourteous welcome, although she would be his wife and he would cut tree trunks every day from the pejibaye tree where he worked.

Once Shulákama fell asleep, Sibö softly blew the remains of the surplus materials and collected them and in a ceremony turned them into non-poisonous snakes, which devoured the poisonous snakes of Shulákama.

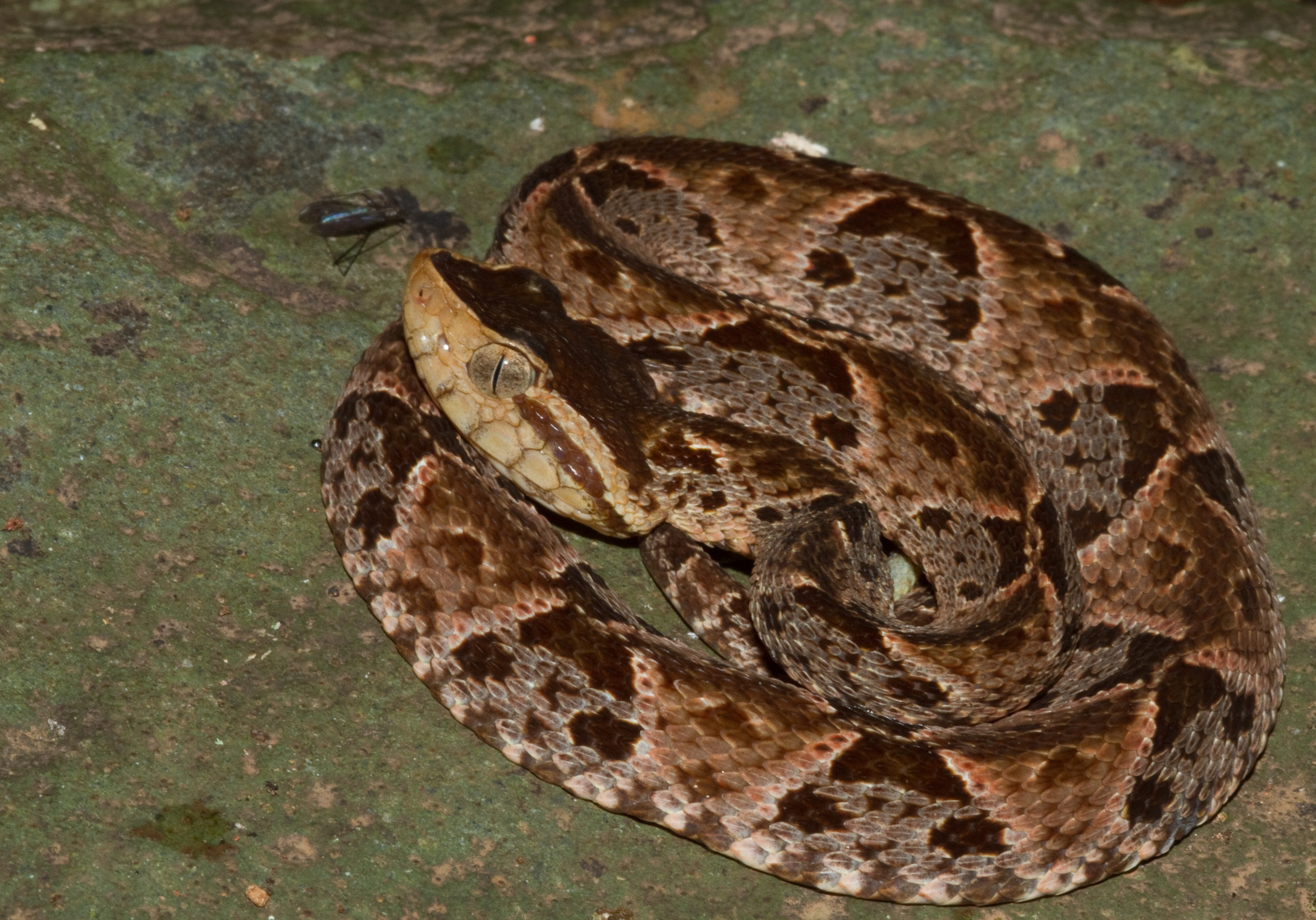
Terciopelo (Bothrops asper), also called fer-de-lance.

Shulakama fell in love with Bulumia and they lived in free union. Bulumia wanted a staff or crozier like he had, so he made her one of a terciopelo (pit viper) and the rules were: always carry it vertically; when sleeping, put it behind the head; carry it with the right arm...... A few months passed and Bulumia became pregnant and Shulakama was happy and proud. One day Bulumia did not want to comply with the rules of the staff. She went to defecate and placed the stick in different positions. She saw her cane slowly roll up to hide in a bush. When she stopped defecating she went to find her staff but could not find it. She returned home and told her husband what happened and asked him to help her look for it but he said: "Go there, your staff must be there." She returned to the thicket and instantly felt a bite from her own staff. She arrived at the house almost dying. When she told her husband what happened, he angrily said, "This is why I did not want to give you the staff, your end has come." She died, but the fetus in her womb was still moving. Shulakama found the staff.

Sibö arrived at Shulakama's palenque and wrapped Bulumia's body in bijagua leaves and brought it to Earth. Sibö looked for an assistant to watch the body. He found Káchabuké the poisonous frog and placed him on her belly. Sibö told him to stand guard over the body of Bulumia for four days and not to move from there. Sibö said that if anything happened to the body it would be Káchabuké's responsibility. The frog felt proud to be the one chosen to take care of the corpse, but he could not sleep well at night because the noise coming from the belly was similar to ocean waves, and his loneliness caused him to become frightened. The days passed and Káchabuké had not eaten anything which caused him great hunger. Sibö sent a bumblebee for the frog to catch and eat, but he could not catch it. The bumblebee collided with some trees and landed, and the frog rushed to catch it. As soon as he jumped, Káchabuké heard a wind and ran back to the corpse, but he was too late; the belly was detached from the corpse and the fetus, a small tree called Duluítami, had emerged. The next day Sibö came looking for the little frog and Duluítami was playing. Sibö said "Why did not you do what I told you?" The frog explained that he was very hungry and tried to grab the bumblebee.

The tree grew with all its splendor and it was wonderful. One day the house of Sibö moved a lot and it was the branch of the tree and there it remained, so Sibö looked for the spirits to cut the branches because there were no humans. Although he was glad that a tree grew for the first time on the bedrock, as the tree grew too much then the spirits decided to cut it but they had to be good, respectful, good habits... At that time they did everything with joy, singing, dancing..., that's why people do things happily, while they cut the tree this crack. Sibö said he did not want to be cut off so early and hiding his way slowly to see the tree and he hugged it and because he did not want to be cut, he put it back together and started to sing until it closed intact. The next morning the spirits returned to finish cutting the tree but the tree was unharmed. They cut it again and Sibö returned to repair it in the night. The next day the spirits blamed Sibö for making fun of them but he said that they gave another chance and when they cut the tree again he made the axes break. To build them strong again they had to go to Ógama's house. But he was upset by their visit and did not want to give them anything, but then he gave them to them and they left. Sibö fell in love with elegant naked ladies and climbed some branches to see them but they broke and Sibö had an accident and the body fell on Earth in pieces and Sulá sent all the animals to bring all the organs and Sulá built it again to this day, but since he did not speak then Sulá said that the vulture ate an organ and this one was hit by an assistant until he vomited up Sibö's liver and he is the same again.

Sibö asked the old woman Bulikela not to reign on the face of the Earth. He asked her to hold the trunk when it is going to fall so it wouldn't bounce too hard. She did, but the trunk bounced so high that the birds all scattered throughout the Earth and the trunk crushed the old woman, forcing humanity to suffer many disasters. Sibö asked the deer Mulurbi je jami Duéyabei to take the tree's crown and drag it four times around the house to turn it into the Earth. Sibö blew and transformed the trunk into the Sea and the birds that lived in the trunk into marine animals. The branches of the tree, depending on the size, became lakes, wells, lagoons, and saline waters.
