= Aranjuez (Costa Rica) =

Coordinates: 10°03′N 84°48′W

- Asentamiento

Aranjuez was a Costa Rican settlement founded in 1568 by the Governor Pero Afán de Ribera y Gómez. It was situated on the banks of the Aranjuez River and was a short distance from the Pacific Ocean coast where a pier, known as the Ribera port, simultaneously emerged.

Aranjuez was depopulated in 1574 by order of the interim governor Alonso Anguciana de Gamboa, who relocated the population to the town of Espiritu Santo which he founded.
