= Canoas River =

There are several rivers named Canoas River in Brazil:

- Canoas River (São Paulo)
- Canoas River (Paraná)
- Canoas River (Mampituba River tributary)
- Canoas River (Santa Catarina)

== See also ==
- Río Cañas (disambiguation)
- Cañas River (disambiguation)
