= Aranjuez River =

River in Puntarenas, Costa Rica

Rio Aranjuez Aranjuez River
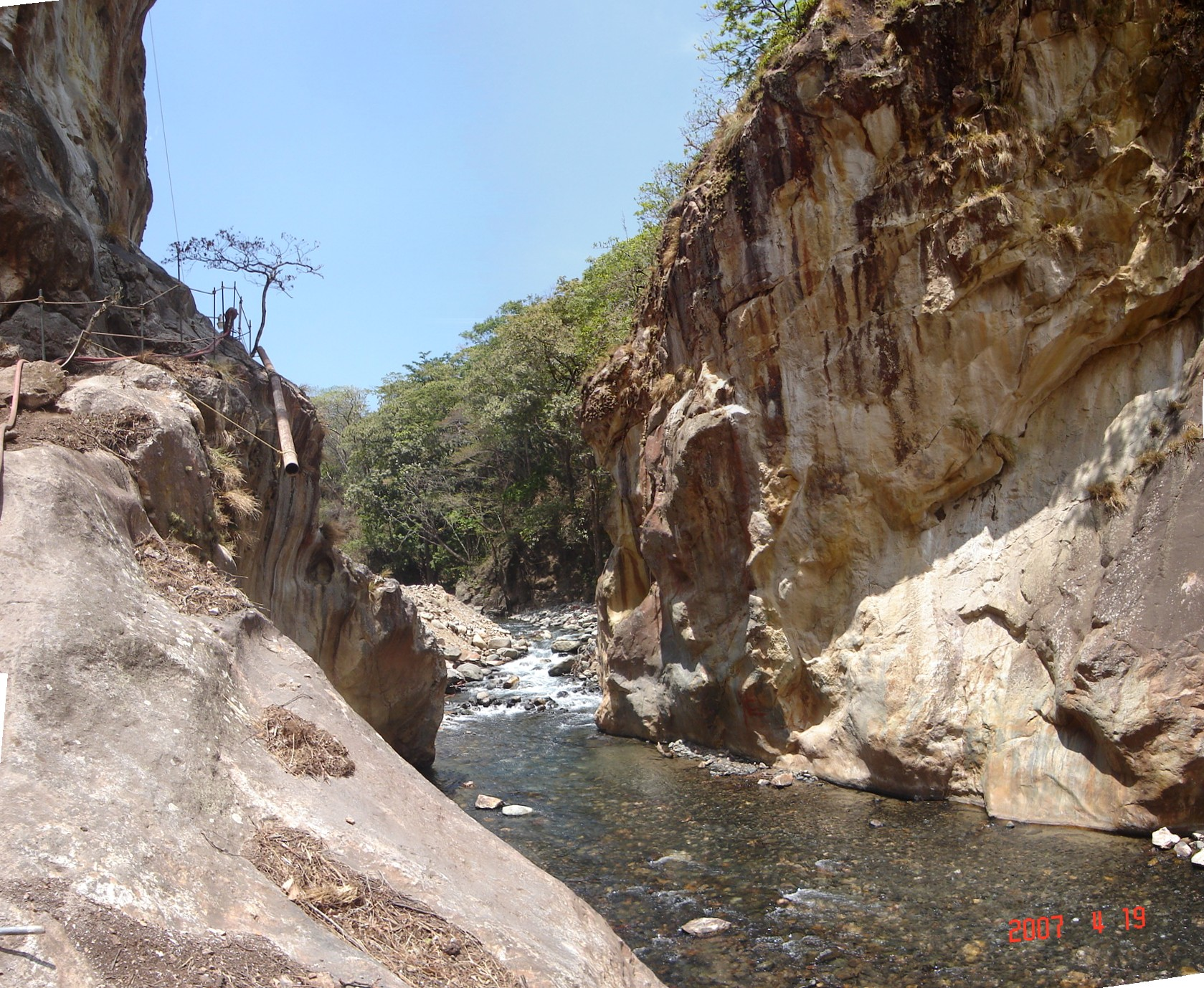

- Location of mouth

Location
- Country: Costa Rica
- Region: Puntarenas

Physical characteristics
- Mouth
  - coordinates: 9°59′09″N 84°49′07″W

The Aranjuez (Spanish pronunciation: [aɾaŋˈxwes]) is a river in Costa Rica that has its source in the mountains and crosses the Guatusos province of Puntarenas. Its basin is about 200 kilometres (120 mi) in area. It empties into the Gulf of Nicoya, in the Pacific Ocean. It takes its name from the defunct colonial city of Aranjuez, which existed in the late 16th century. At the mouth of the river was the port of Ribera, in the place now called Pitahaya Vieja.

== See also ==
- List of rivers of Costa Rica
