= Savegre River =

River in Costa Rica

Savegre River Rio Savegre
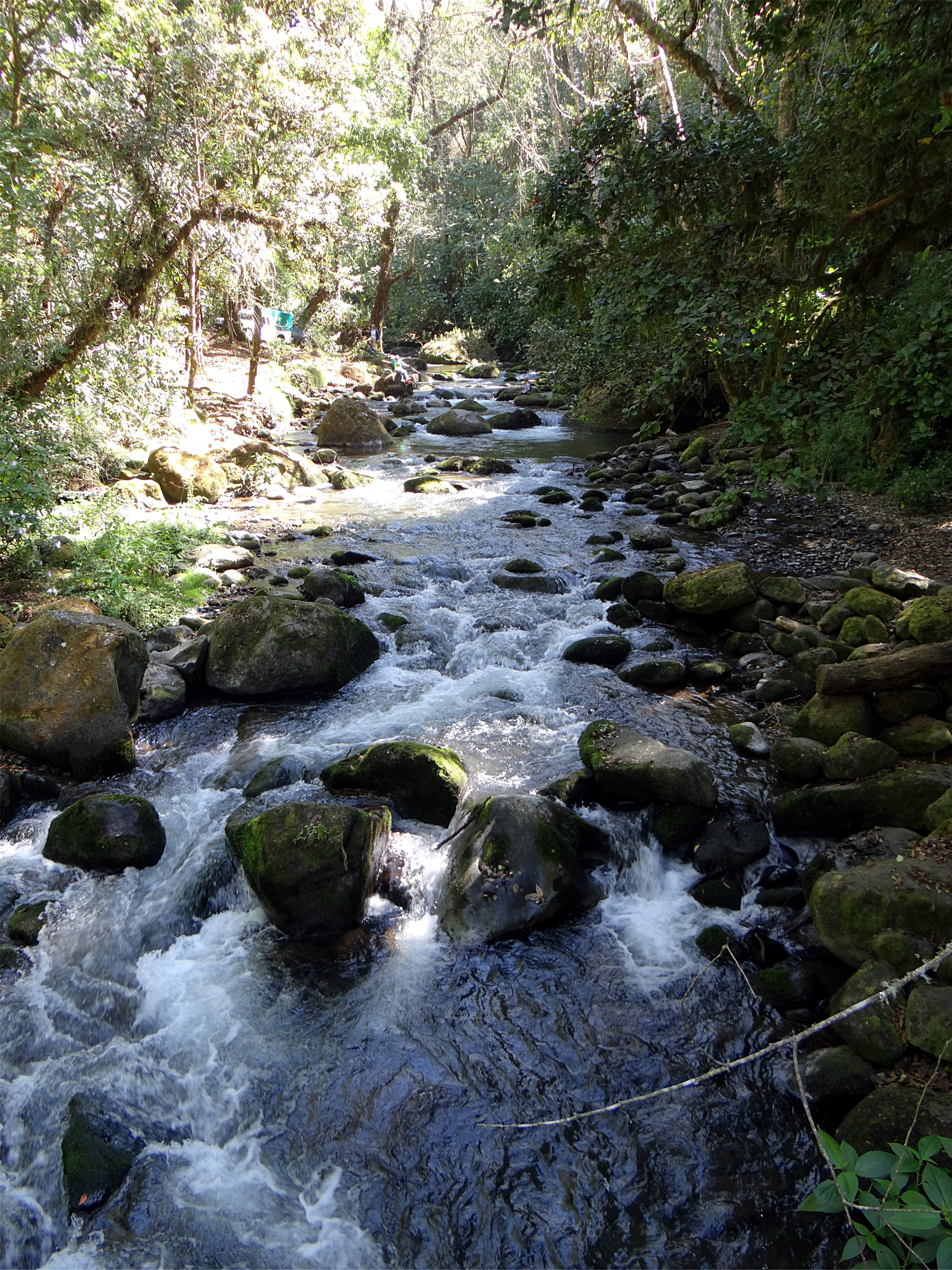
- The river Savegre near San Gerardo de Dota, Costa Rica

- Location of mouth

Location
- Country: Costa Rica

Physical characteristics
- Mouth
  - location: Pacific Ocean
  - coordinates: 9°20′48″N 84°01′53″W
  - elevation: 0 m (0 ft)

The Savegre River (Spanish pronunciation: [saˈβeɣɾe]) is a river in Costa Rica that flows to the Pacific Ocean. The source is at Quebrada Providencia in the Cerro de la Muerte, Cordillera de Talamanca, at 3,491 m (11,453 ft) above sea level, and after receiving the Division River, it travels 41 linear kilometers of rugged topography to flow into the Pacific Ocean. Its basin covers 590 km^{2} (230 sq mi) and runs through four cantons: Dota, Tarrazú, Pérez Zeledón and Quepos. It is considered one of the cleanest rivers in the country. Its basin is one of the most eco-diverse regions of Costa Rica: 47 different ecosystems have been identified in it, of which 9 are natural, 15 semi-natural and 23 cultural, for what most of the basin is protected by the Los Quetzales National Park and the Manuel Antonio National Park. On June 14, 2017, the Savegre river basin was declared a Biosphere Reserve by UNESCO.

== See also ==
- List of rivers of Costa Rica
