= Cañas (surname) =

- Reedbed at Lagunas de Castejón. Zarzalejo, Madrid, Spain.

Origin
- Meaning: "reed"
- Region of origin: Iberian Peninsula

Other names
- Alternative spelling: Canas

Cañas or Canas is a Spanish and Portuguese surname. It is derived from the Spanish caña and Portuguese canas, both ultimately derived from Latin canna meaning 'reed'. It is a topographic surname that refers to people living in marshy areas.

Notable people with the surname include:

- Alberto Cañas Escalante, Costa Rican politician
- Antonio José Cañas, Salvadoran military officer, diplomat and politician
- Carlos Cañas, Salvadoran painter
- Guillermo Cañas, Argentinian professional tennis player
- Jorge Cañas, Salvadoran footballer
- José Cañas Ruiz-Herrera, Spanish footballer
- José María Cañas, Costa Rican military officer and politician
- José Marín Cañas, Costa Rican journalist and writer
- Juan José Cañas, co-author of the National Hymn of El Salvador
- Juan José Cañas Gutiérrez, former Spanish footballer
- Ricardo Moreno Cañas, Costa Rican politician
- Vicente Cañas, Spanish Christian missionary and Jesuit brother
