= Tenório =

Coordinates: 6°56′31″S 36°37′44″W

- Municipality
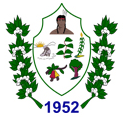
- Flag Coat of arms
- Interactive map of Tenório
- Country: Brazil
- Region: South
- State: Paraíba
- Mesoregion: Boborema

Population (2020)
  - Total: 3,081
- Time zone: UTC−3 (BRT)

Tenório is a municipality in the state of Paraíba in the Northeast Region of Brazil.

== See also ==
- List of municipalities in Paraíba
