= Yorkin River =

River in Costa Rica and Panama

Coordinates: 9.5050°N 82.8423°W

Yorkin River Río Yorkín
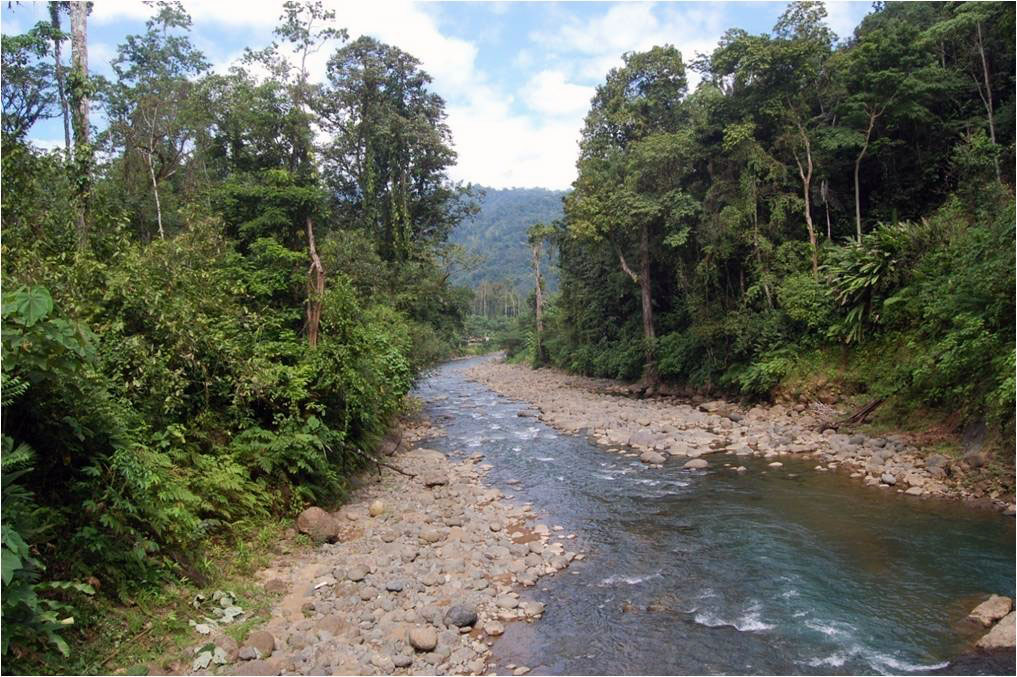
- The Yorkin River near Sixaola

Location
- Countries: Costa Rica, Panama

Physical characteristics
- Source: Talamanca Mountains
- Mouth: Confluence with Telire River to form the Sixaola River
  - location: Costa Rica–Panama border

Basin features
- Border significance: Forms part of the Costa Rica–Panama border

Yorkin River is a river of Costa Rica and Panama which marks part of their border. Its confluence with the Telire River creates the Sixaola.

Although the Yorkin has changed its course due to flooding, the border has not changed. This has led to confusion among the local Bribri people, who have illegally cultivated bananas on the wrong side of the border.
