= Sierpe River =

Sierpe River Rio Sierpe
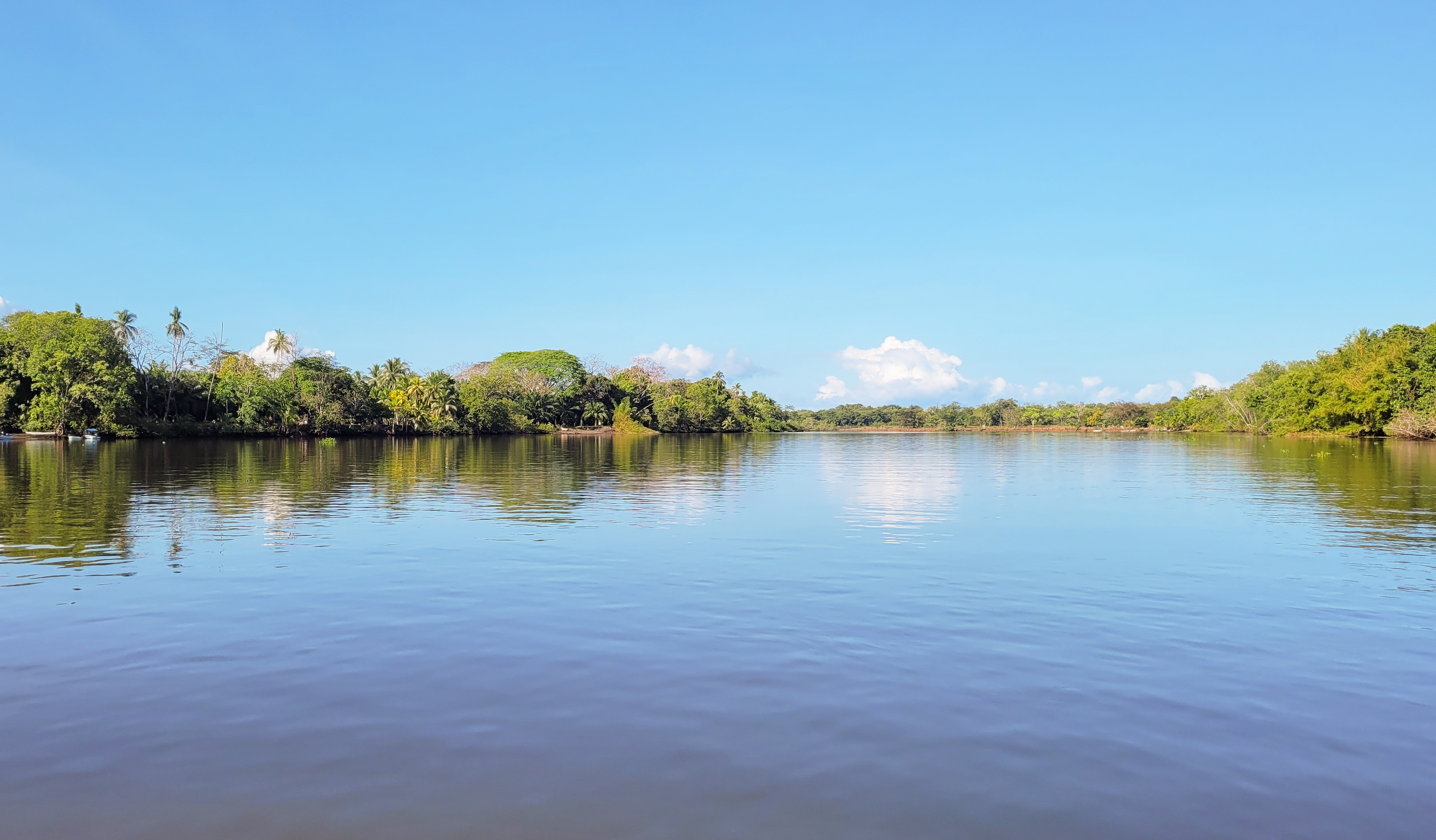
- Sierpe River in Puntarenas Province

- Location of mouth

Location
- Country: Costa Rica

Physical characteristics
- Mouth
  - location: Pacific Ocean
  - coordinates: 8°49′N 83°34′W

Designations

Ramsar Wetland
- Official name: Terraba-Sierpe
- Designated: 11 December 1995
- Reference no.: 782

Sierpe River (Spanish: Rio Sierpe) is a river of Costa Rica. Boat traffic is common with both locals and tourists. A broad range of wildlife can be seen from the American Crocodile, various other reptile species, and exotic fish and birds. It joins the Rio Terraba.
