= Guacimal River =

River in Costa Rica

Guacimal River Rio Guacimal
- Location of mouth

Location
- Country: Costa Rica
- Region: Puntarenas

Physical characteristics
- Mouth
  - coordinates: 10°01′32″N 84°53′57″W
  - elevation: 0 m (0 ft)

Guacimal River (Spanish: Rio Guacimal) is a river of Costa Rica.
