= Tenorio River =

River in Costa Rica

The Tenorio River (Spanish: Río Tenorio) is a river in Guanacaste Province, Costa Rica, and one of the two headwater rivers of the Bebedero River, which is formed at the confluence of the Tenorio and the Blanco. Along its course the Tenorio takes in the Cuipilapa, Tenorito and Corobicí rivers as tributaries. The Bebedero drains into the Tempisque River, with which it forms a large estuary in the Gulf of Nicoya.

In 1962, the bat species Trachops cirrhosus was reported at Rio Tenorio near Las Cañas in Guanacaste Province.
