= Pocosol River =

River in Costa Rica

Pocosol River (Spanish pronunciation: [pokoˈsol]) is a river in northern Costa Rica.
