= Jesús María River =

River in Costa Rica

Jesús María River Rio Jesús María
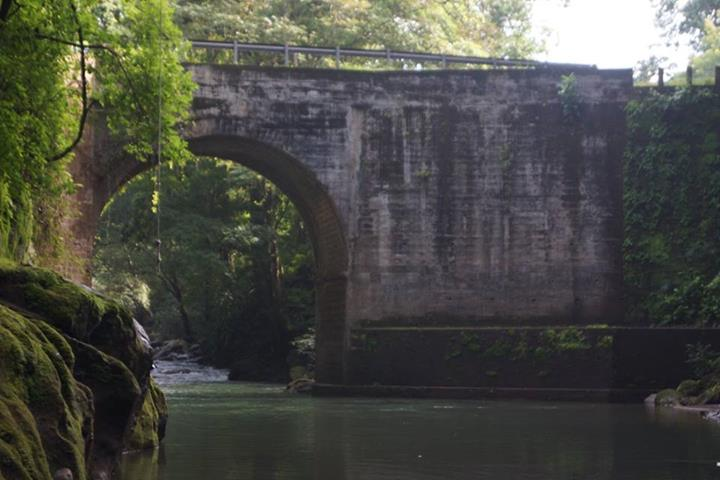
- Passage of the Jesus Maria River by the Las Damas bridge, San Mateo

- Location of mouth

Location
- Country: Costa Rica

Physical characteristics
- Mouth
  - coordinates: 9°51′49″N 84°41′50″W

Jesús María River is a river of Costa Rica.
