= Sabogal River =

River in Costa Rica

Sabogal River (Spanish pronunciation: [saβoˈɣal]) is a river of Costa Rica. It is one of the main tributaries of the Frio River.
