= Chirripó Pacifico River =

River in Costa Rica

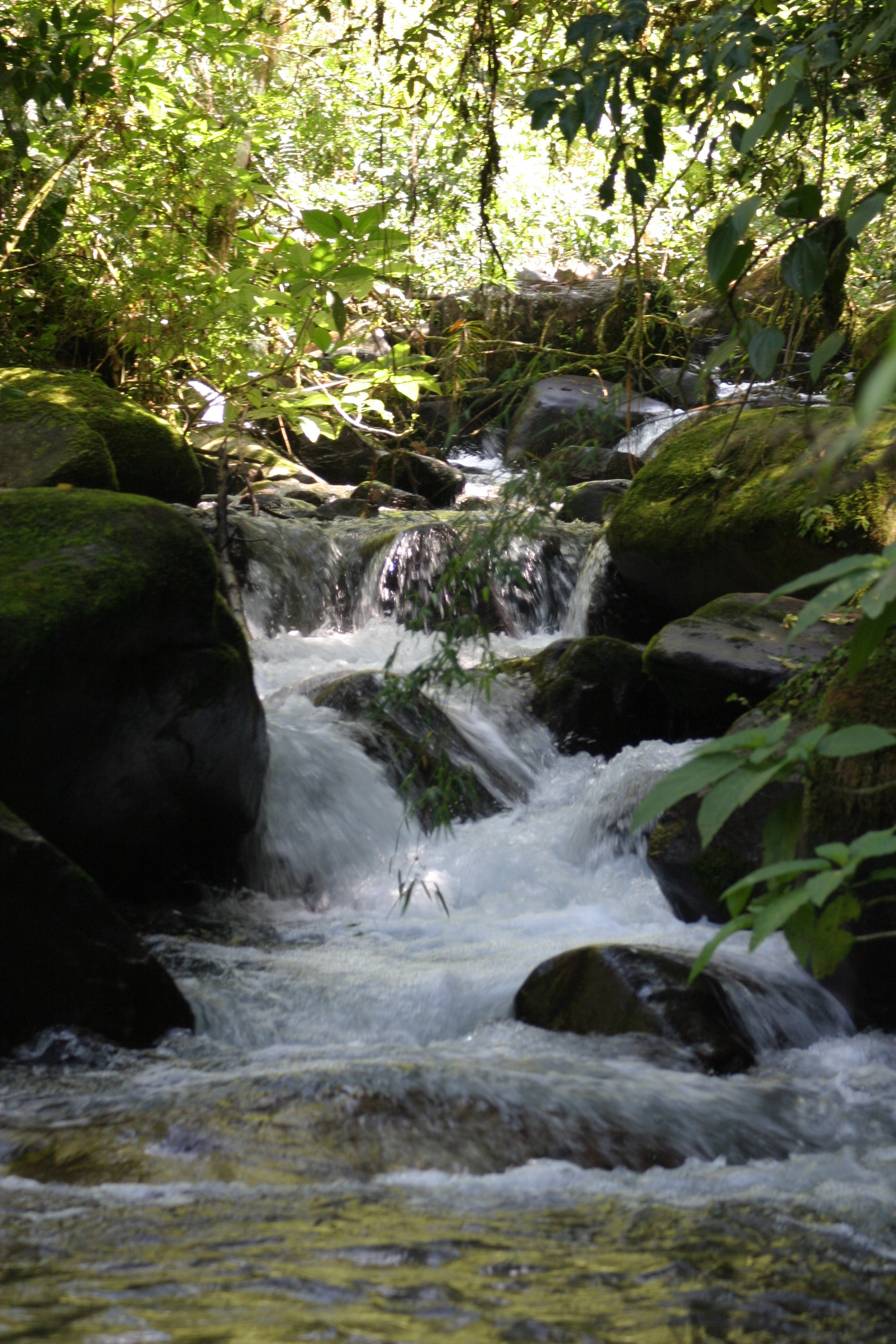
Chirripó Pacífico river in the upper part of its basin

Chirripó Pacifico River is a river of Costa Rica.
