= Cañas River (Bebedero River tributary) =

River in Costa Rica

Cañas River is a river of Costa Rica. It is a tributary of the Bebedero River. It goes into Nicaragua.
