= Chirripó Duchi River =

River in Costa Rica

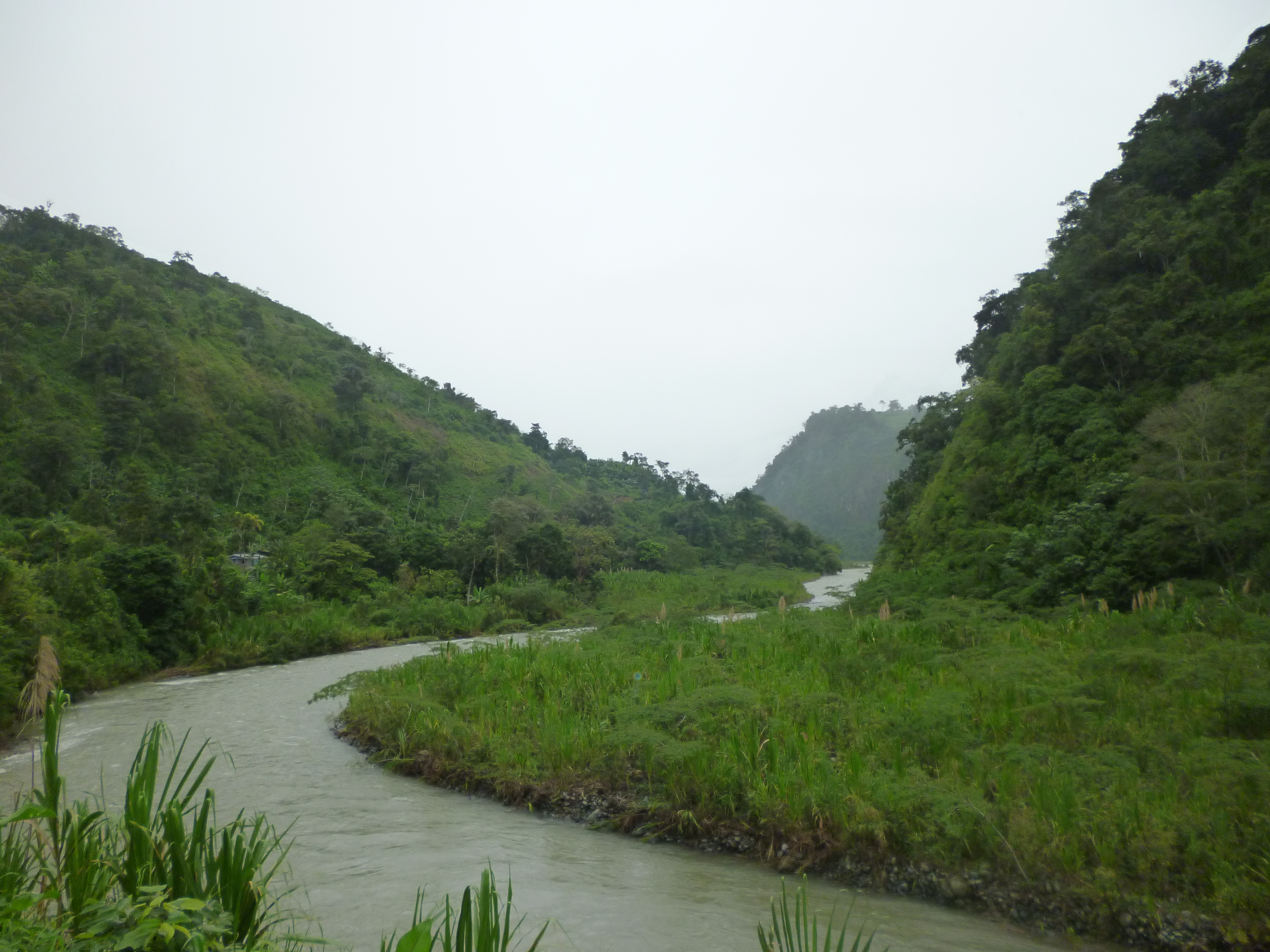
Chirripó River at the height of Roca Quemada

Chirripó Duchi River is a river located in Costa Rica.
