= Cabécar people =

Cabécar
Total population
- 17,000

Regions with significant populations
- Costa Rica

Languages
- Cabécar, Spanish

Related ethnic groups
- Bribri

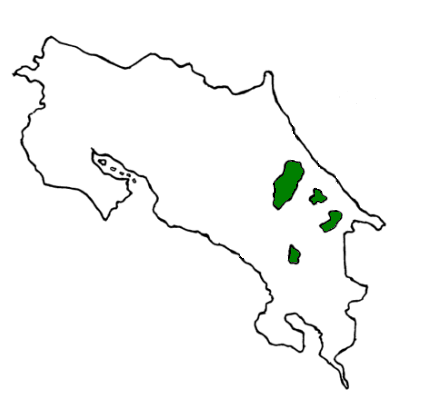
Cabécar territories in Costa Rica

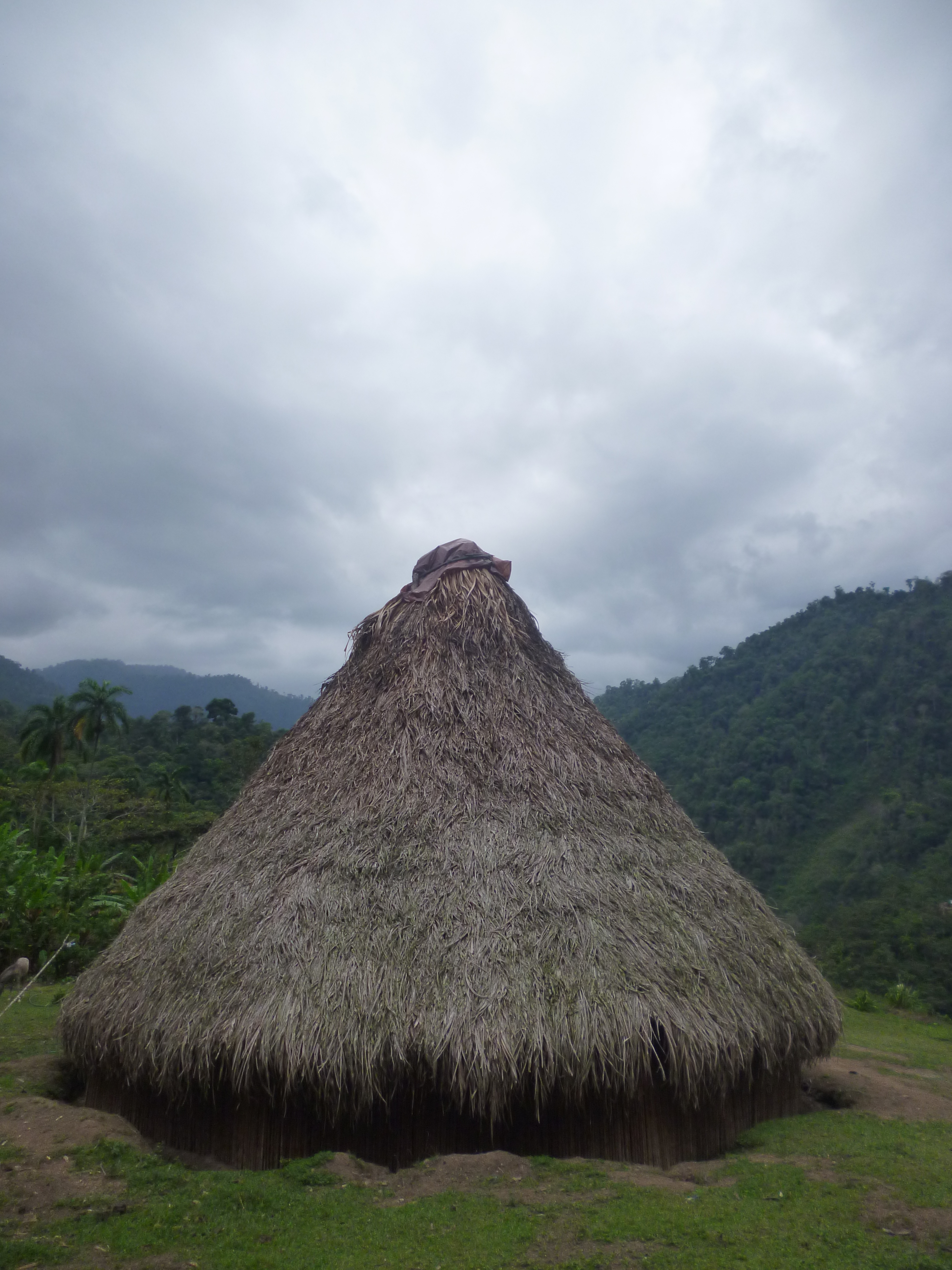
A traditional Cabécar dwelling

The Cabécar are an Indigenous group of the remote Talamanca region of eastern Costa Rica. They speak Cabécar, a language belonging to the Chibchan language family of the Isthmo-Colombian Area of lower Central America and northwestern Colombia. According to census data from the National Institute of Statistics and Census of Costa Rica (Instituto Nacional de Estadística y Censos, INEC), the Cabécar are the largest Indigenous group in Costa Rica with a population of nearly 17,000.

Cabécar territory extends northwest from the Río Coen to the Río Reventazón. Many Cabécar settlements today are located inside reserves established by Costa Rican law in 1976 to protect Indigenous ancestral homelands. These reserves exhibit ecological diversity, including vast swaths of tropical rainforest covering steep escarpments and large river valleys where many Cabécar still employ traditional subsistence livelihoods and cultural practices.

== History ==
=== Language ===
Cabécar is one of sixteen remaining languages in the Chibchan language family of the Isthmo-Colombian Area, a region of southern Central America (specifically eastern Honduras, Nicaragua, Costa Rica, and Panama) and northwestern Colombia bifurcating the areas of Mesoamerican and South American linguistic traditions. The extensive geographic distribution of the Chibchan language family has sparked debate among scholars regarding the origin and diffusion of Chibchan languages. Two conceptual models have emerged to describe possible scenarios: the Theory of North Migration and the Centrifugal Expansion Theory. The former postulates Colombia as the historical epicenter from which Chibchan linguistic groups migrated northwestward into present-day Panama, Costa Rica, Nicaragua, and Honduras. However, anthropological and archaeological evidence (see Cooke and Ranere 1992; Fonseca and Cooke 1993; Fonseca 1994), combined with glottochronological studies (see Constenla 1981, 1985, 1989, 1991, 1995), prefer the Centrifugal Expansion Theory suggesting that Chibchan-speaking groups developed in-situ over a long period of time from an origin at the Talamanca mountain range of present-day Costa Rica and Panama. From there, Chibchan linguistic groups migrated and settled as far north as eastern Honduras and as far south as Colombia.

=== Talamancan Indigenous groups ===
Today the Bribri and Cabécar Indigenous groups are known collectively as the Talamanca. The term Talamanca is not Indigenous; it was adopted in the early 17th century from the Spanish town of Santiago de Talamanca as an umbrella designation for the aboriginal groups living between the current Costa Rican-Panamian border and the Río Coen in Costa Rica. Spanish records document the names of many closely related groups (Ara, Ateo, Abicetaba, Blancos, Biceitas or Viceitas, Korrhué, Ucabarúa, and Valientes) living in this area who became known collectively as the Talamanca.

A scarcity of historical documents describing aboriginal groups in southeastern Costa Rica has made it difficult for scholars to differentiate the culture histories of the present-day Bribri and Cabécar. Spanish Franciscan fathers in the early 17th century noted linguistic differences among the various Talamancan tribes mentioned above, but generally these groups became known more broadly as the Bribri or Cabécar according to their geographic location east or west of the Río Dyke. Bribri elders maintain that their name is a derivation of dererri, the Bribri term for "strong" or "hard." Conversely, Cabécar elders suggest that their name derives from the words kabé (quetzal) and ká (place), in reference to the Cabécar ancestral tradition of eating the quetzal. Modern Bribri and Cabécar languages are similar in lexicon, orthography, and tonal levels (high and low pitches), but they are not mutually interchangeable.

== Subsistence livelihoods ==
A variety of activities characterize Cabécar subsistence livelihoods today. These include small-scale agriculture, hunting, fishing, and harvesting wild flora for food, medicine, house materials, and a host of other uses. Cabécar subsistence in the natural environment takes place in two realms: the ‘near space’ in and around the house or village, where human activity has modified the landscape; and the ‘far space,’ where natural, primary forests remain unchanged and where human activity must coexist harmoniously with the environment. Subsistence agriculture in near space is one of the most important activities in which Cabécar households employ three distinct agricultural systems: tropical home gardens, slash-and-burn, and plantain cultivation.

=== Tropical home gardens ===
Cabécar households maintain tropical home gardens with a variety of trees and plants for domestic consumption. These gardens generally are very dense with a multi-layered canopy. Cedar (Cedrela odorata), laurel (Cordia alliodora), balsa (Ochroma pyramidale) and peach palm (pejibaye or Bactris gasipaes) are among the tallest trees often found in Cabécar tropical home gardens. Lower strata include permanent crops such as coffee (Coffea arabica) and cacao (Theobroma cacao). The lowest stratum is characterized by medicinal plants, shrubs, and tubers, including chili pepper (Capsicum annuum), manioc (Manihot esculenta), and tiquisque (Xanthosoma violaceum). The Cabécar maintain their tropical home gardens by removing undesired underbrush to allow for growth of wild species that can also be harvested to supplement Cabécar everyday needs.

=== Slash-and-burn agriculture ===
Cabécar subsistence farmers practice rotating slash-and-burn agriculture for basic food requirements. This technique is employed during the driest month to clear dense underbrush from a plot using a machete or axe. The plant biomass is left to dehydrate and decompose for several weeks and then eliminated in a controlled burn. After the plot cools, the farmer can sow basic grains by placing seeds into shallow holes in the topsoil made by the sharpened tip of a branch fashioned from the pejibaye palm (Bactris gasipaes).

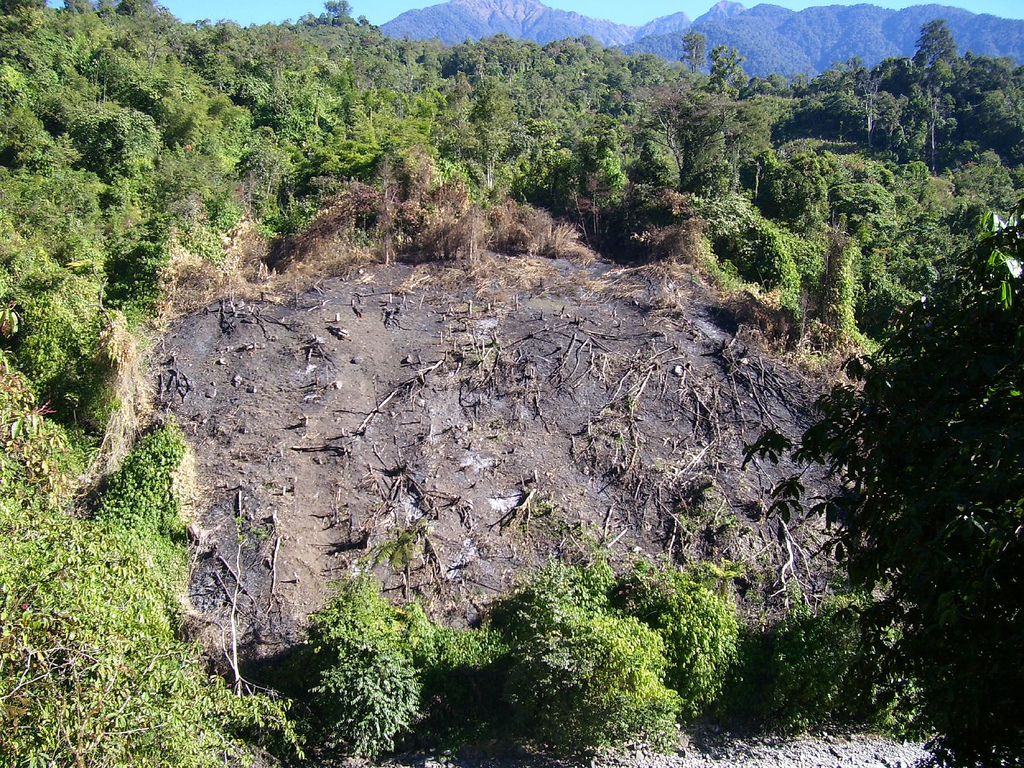
Slash-and-burn agriculture

Cabécar farmers generally select a plot roughly one hectare in size in either alluvial valleys or on steep upland slopes where basic grains like rice (Oryza sativa) and maize (Zea mays) are cultivated with beans (Phaseolus vulgaris) and rotated with alternating fallow (rest) periods. It is not uncommon for one Cabécar household to work two or three plots, rotating cultivated crops both within and among them. Once a plot has yielded two or three grain harvests, it is left fallow for as long as twelve years to regain its fertility. During this lapse, secondary growth covers the plot, and the Cabécar harvest non-cultivated species to supplement their dietary, medicinal, and material needs.

=== Plantain cultivation ===
Cultivation of the exotic plantain hybrid (Musa x paradisiaca) in both monoculture and polyculture plots has become increasingly prevalent in Cabécar communities and has changed the structure of their traditional tropical home gardens. Cabécar households now rely on plantains for domestic consumption and as a cash economy to generate monetary income. Home gardens that have incorporated plantains tend to exhibit less plant diversity and lower density, and some Cabécar farmers have abandoned traditional Indigenous agroecosystems in favor of larger plantain monoculture plots.

== Social organization ==
=== Villages ===
Cabécar villages have houses and other structures are not nucleated around a central location. Instead, dwellings are often dispersed, sometimes a few kilometers apart. The notion of densely nucleated towns or villages was introduced in the region by the Spanish in the colonial era to coerce Talamancan Indigenous groups into concentrated settlements, but these attempts were met with resistance. Stone observes that the word for ‘town’ or ‘city’ does not even exist in Bribri or Cabécar languages; instead ‘city’ is represented in Bribri as ‘great place or extension’ and in Cabécar as ‘place of many houses’. Most Cabécar and Bribri villages reflect patterns of dispersed settlement today, an indicator of the geographic isolation of the Talamanca region and of the limited contact these Indigenous groups had with the Spanish.

=== Clans ===
Cabécar social organization is predicated on matrilineal clans in which the mother is the head of household. Matrimonial norms restrict an individual from marrying a relative within the blood group related to the individual's mother. On the father's side, marriages are not prohibited beyond the father's sisters and first cousins. Each matrilineal clan controls marriage possibilities, regulates land tenure, and determines property inheritance for its members. Private land tenure, like the nucleated village system, was foreign to the Cabécar before contact with the Spanish. Each clan traditionally has maintained its own designated area for the subsistence activities of its members.

Personal property is inherited or passed on to clan relatives after the death of an individual. When a man dies, his personal effects can be inherited by his siblings, unless his mother is still alive, in which case she would assume possession. When she passes away, the belongings are inherited by whomever she designated as the subsequent owner. Contact with non-Indigenous peoples has exposed the Cabécar to Western forms of land tenure based on private ownership. Some Cabécar villages have begun to recognize land as property, evident in the construction of fences that demarcate boundaries around agricultural plots or household gardens, but traditional Cabécar land tenure regimes in which land is controlled communally by the matrilineal clan still persist.

=== Persecution ===
The tribe's sovereignty of their land is being threatened by Latino farmers who have killed chiefs and disarmed tribals in the 21st century.

== See also ==
- Talamancan mythology
- Sibú, the primary deity of the Cabécar mythology
- Indigenous peoples of Costa Rica
- Indigenous peoples of the Americas
- Isthmo-Colombian Area
- Chibchan languages
- Bribri people
- Cordillera de Talamanca
