= Jorge Cañas =

Salvadoran footballer (1942–1997)

Personal information
- Full name: Jorge Joaquín Cañas Cerna
- Date of birth: 12 December 1942
- Place of birth: Santa Ana, El Salvador
- Date of death: August 17, 1997 (aged 54)
- Position: Forward

Senior career*
| Years | Team | Apps | (Gls) |
| 1958–1962 | FAS | | |
- Once Municipal
- Atlante San Alejo
- Universidad
- Excélsior
- H-13
- Sonsonate
| 1971 | FAS | | |

International career
| 1960 | El Salvador | | |
- * Club domestic league appearances and goals

Jorge Joaquín Cañas Cerna was a Salvadoran football player. Throughout his career he had various nicknames: El Cuto, La Flecha and Cañitas.

Jorge Cañas was the son of Amanda Cañas Cerna and Jorge Alberto Cañas Andrade. His younger siblings are: his brother Carlos Ernesto Cañas Cerna (who also played as a fearless left defender in C.D. FAS) and his baby sister (as Cañitas always referred to her because of their large age difference) Elizabeth Nájera Cañas.

Cañitas was beloved by fans, teammates and the team management. A testament to this was seen at the religious mass on the 10th anniversary of his death, which in addition to his mother, brother, sister and surviving family (wife, two sons, a daughter and grand children), was also attended by several of his C.D. FAS teammates and by Don Jaime Battle (ex-president of C.D. Fas).

Although Cañitas and his younger brother, nicknamed El Burro, played together at C.D. FAS in 1972, they also often found each other in opposing teams.

A common anecdote between the brothers came from a match where they played for opposing teams and where they were matched up against each other. El Burro was playing at C.D. FAS and Cañitas at Sonsonate. Sonsonate had a green uniform, with green socks. The brothers joked in later years about facing each other in that match, where El Burro played a very rough game against his older sibling. After the match, when they arrived at their common home, Cañitas confronted his younger brother about his rough play during the match, to which El Burro responded: Hey, all I saw were the green socks!

== Club career ==
Born in Santa Ana, El Salvador, Cañitas played most of his career with his beloved team and local giants C.D. FAS, with whom he won the league title in 1962 and in 1971.
