= Cañas River (Mexico) =

Coordinates: 22.62637°N 105.66170°W

Location
- Country: Mexico

The Cañas River is a river in Nayarit and Sinaloa in Mexico.

== See also ==
- List of rivers of Mexico
