= Piedras River (Costa Rica) =

River in Costa Rica

Piedras River (Río Piedras, Spanish pronunciation: [ˈpjeðɾas]) is a river in Guanacaste Province of Costa Rica. It rises in the Cordillera de Guanacaste and flows southward through Hacienda Tamarindo and joins Bebedero River near the town of Bebedero.
