= Tenorio (surname) =

Tenorio is a surname. Notable people with the surname include:

== Politicians ==
- Angelito Tenorio (born 1996), Wisconsin politician
- Froilan Tenorio (1939–2020), Northern Mariana Islander politician
- Josh Tenorio, Guamanian politician
- Mercedes Tenorio (born 1956), Nicaraguan politician
- Nicolas Tenorio Cerero (1863–1930), Spanish historian
- Pedro Agulto Tenorio (born 1941), Northern Marianan politician
- Pedro Pangelinan Tenorio (1934–2018), Northern Mariana Islander politician
- Ray Tenorio (born 1965), American-Guamanian politician

== Sports ==
- Ángela Tenorio (born 1996), Ecuadorian athlete
- Carlos Tenorio (born 1979), Ecuadorian football player
- Edwin Tenorio (born 1976), Ecuadorian football player
- LA Tenorio (born 1984), Filipino basketball player
- Máximo Tenorio (born 1968), Ecuadorian football player
- Otilino Tenorio (1980–2005), Ecuadorian football player
- Rosa Tenorio (born 1984), Ecuadorian weightlifter

== Other ==
- Bruna Tenório (born 1989), Brazilian model
- JoAnn M. Tenorio (1943–2019), American entomologist
- Tirso de Molina's comedy El Burlador de Sevilla for the first time on the world's stage introduces Don Juan. In the play his name is Don Juan Tenorio, and his father's name is Don Diego Tenorio.
