= Cañas River (Mayagüez, Puerto Rico) =

River of Puerto Rico

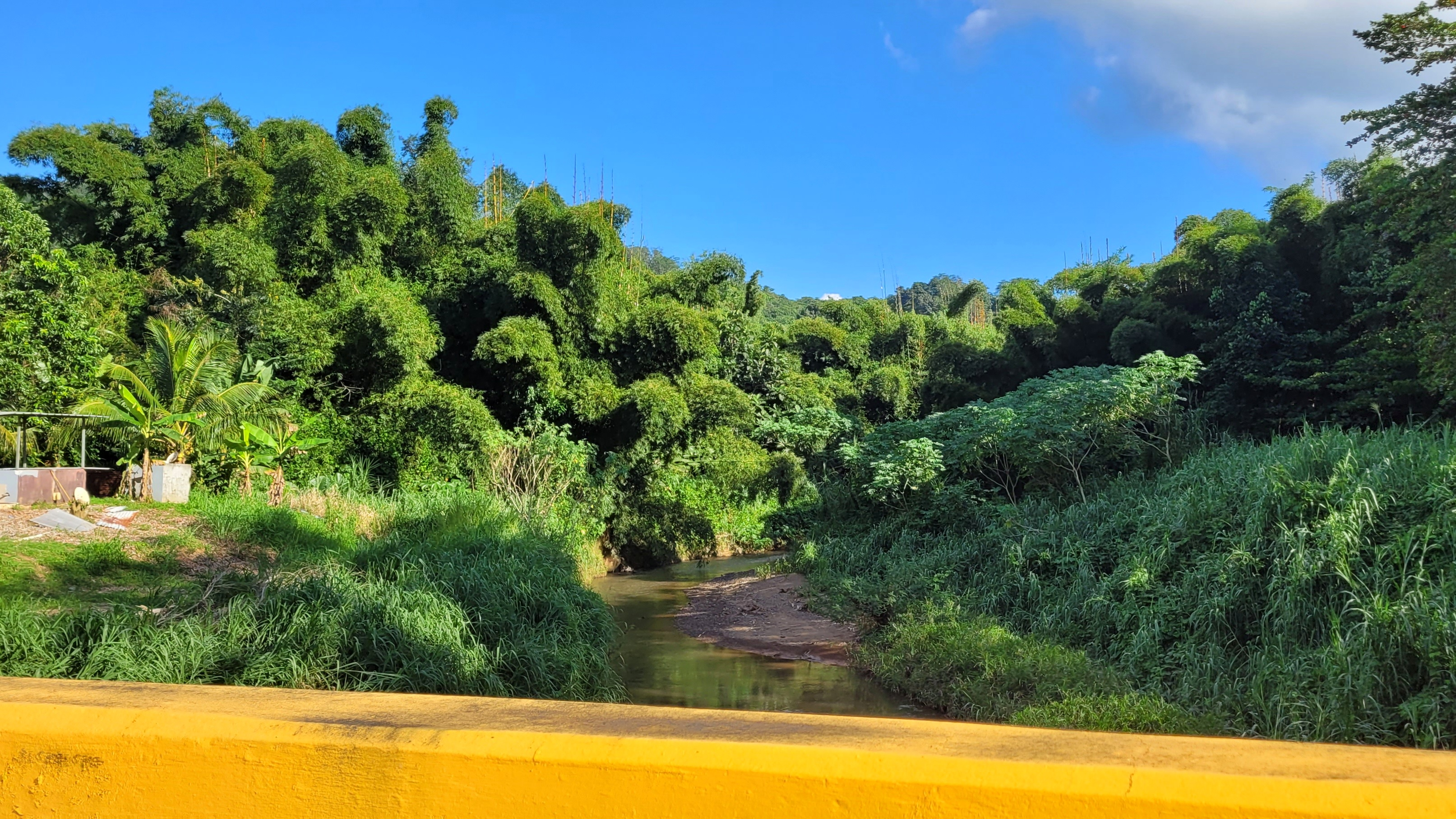
- Río Cañas from Puerto Rico Highway 108

Location
- Commonwealth: Puerto Rico
- Municipality: Mayagüez

Physical characteristics
- Source
  - coordinates: 18.2635634°N 67.1349021°W
- Mouth
  - location: Añasco River in Sabanetas, Mayagüez

The Cañas River (Spanish: Río Cañas) is a tributary of the Añasco River that flows through the municipality of Mayagüez in Puerto Rico.

== See also ==
- List of rivers of Puerto Rico
