= Salto River (Costa Rica) =

River in Costa Rica

Salto River is a river of Costa Rica.

The river originates in the foothills of the Guanacaste Mountains, draining southwesterly to join the Tempisque River.
