= Tamarindo River =

River in Guanacaste Province, Costa Rica

Coordinates: 10.307177°N 85.840249°W

Tamarindo River is a river in the Guanacaste Province of Costa Rica. The estuary is adjacent to the town of Tamarindo. The river spans 490 hectares (1,200 acres) and serves as the natural border between Tamarindo and Playa Grande. The estuary is home to much wildlife, including ospreys, herons and kingfishers in addition to howler monkeys and coatimundis. In particular, it hosts the American crocodile, which draws tourists to the estuary. The river estuary is a popular place for surfing despite the local caiman population.

The river is a major obstacle to reaching Playa Grande from Tamarindo.
