= Villar de Cañas =

Villar de Cañas, Spain
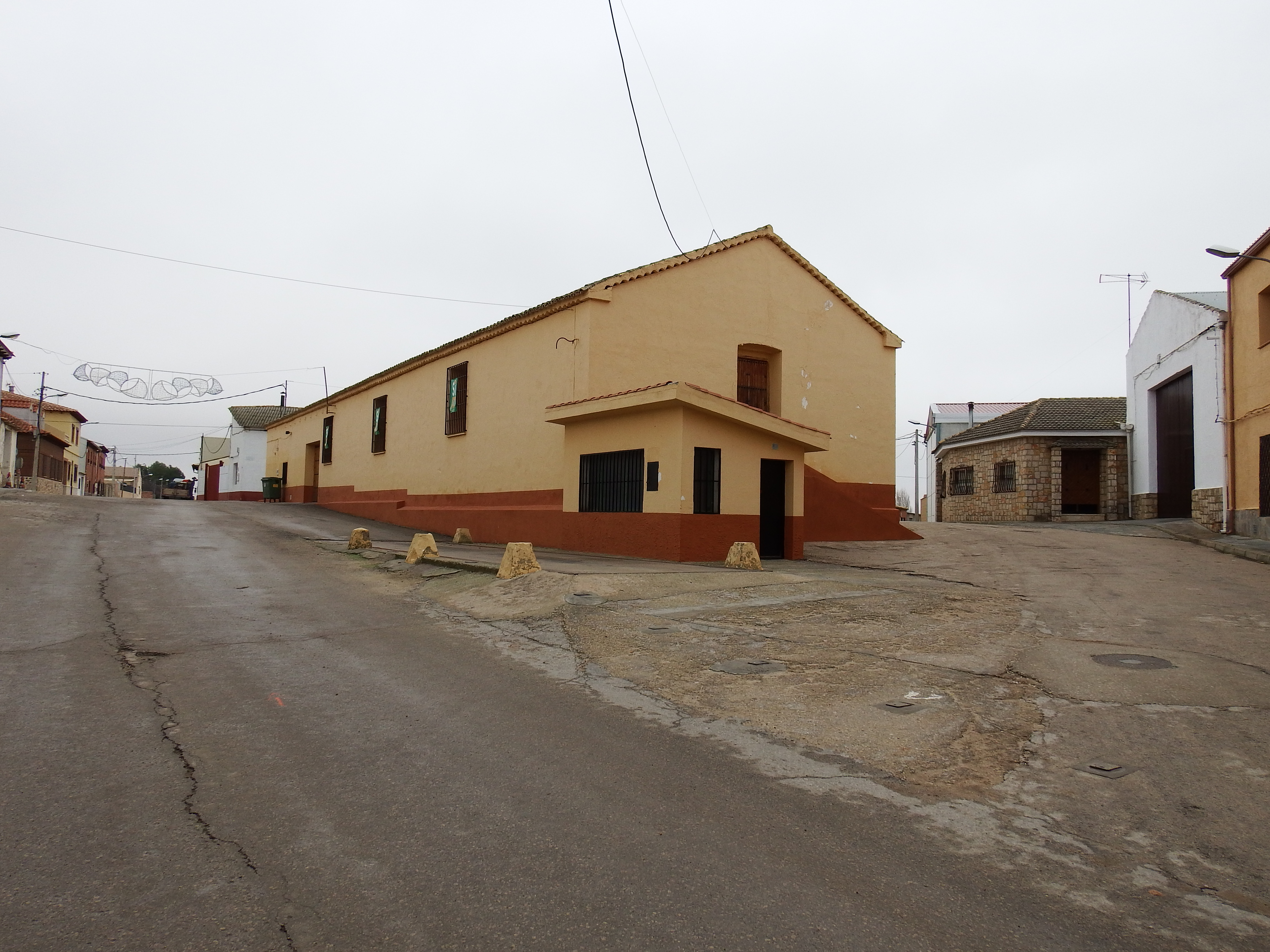

- Coat of arms

- Location within Spain Location within Castilla-La Mancha
- Country: Spain
- Autonomous community: Castile-La Mancha
- Province: Cuenca
- Municipality: Villar de Cañas

Area
  - Total: 70.60 km^{2} (27.26 sq mi)
- Elevation: 820 m (2,690 ft)

Population (2025-01-01)
  - Total: 389
  - Density: 5.51/km^{2} (14.3/sq mi)
- Time zone: UTC+1 (CET)
  - Summer (DST): UTC+2 (CEST)

Villar de Cañas is a municipality located in the province of Cuenca, Castile-La Mancha, Spain. According to the 2004 census (INE), the municipality had a population of 457 inhabitants.
