= Barranca River =

River in Costa Rica

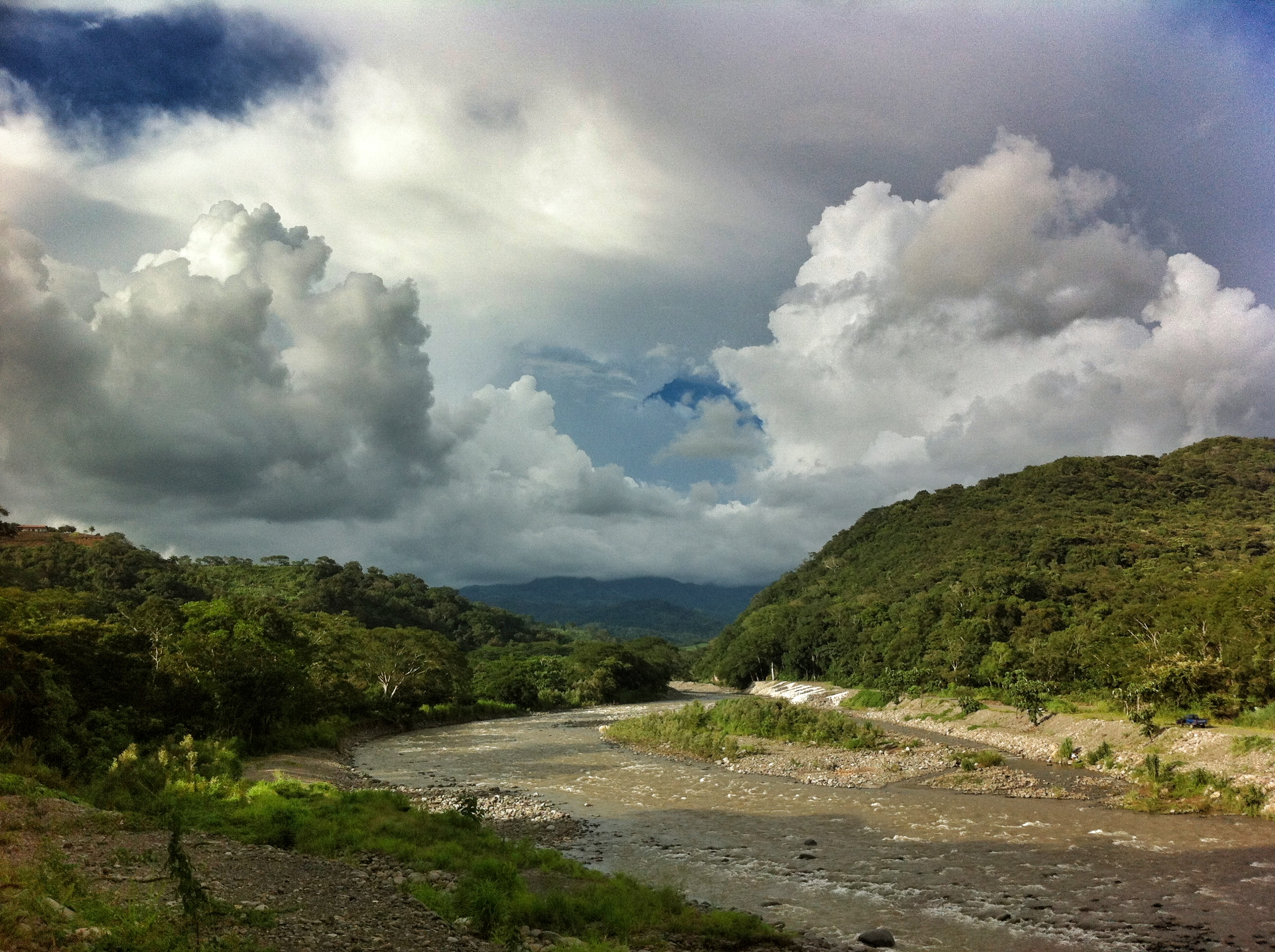
- Barranca River, Costa Rica

- Location within Costa Rica
- Etymology: Canyon or Gully River
- Native name: Río Barranca

Location
- Country: Costa Rica
- Province: Puntarenas

Physical characteristics
- Mouth: Boca Barranca
  - location: Pacific Ocean
  - coordinates: 9°57′32″N 84°44′15″W
  - elevation: 0m

Barranca River is a river in the province of Puntarenas in Costa Rica.
