= Río Grande de Añasco =

River of Puerto Rico

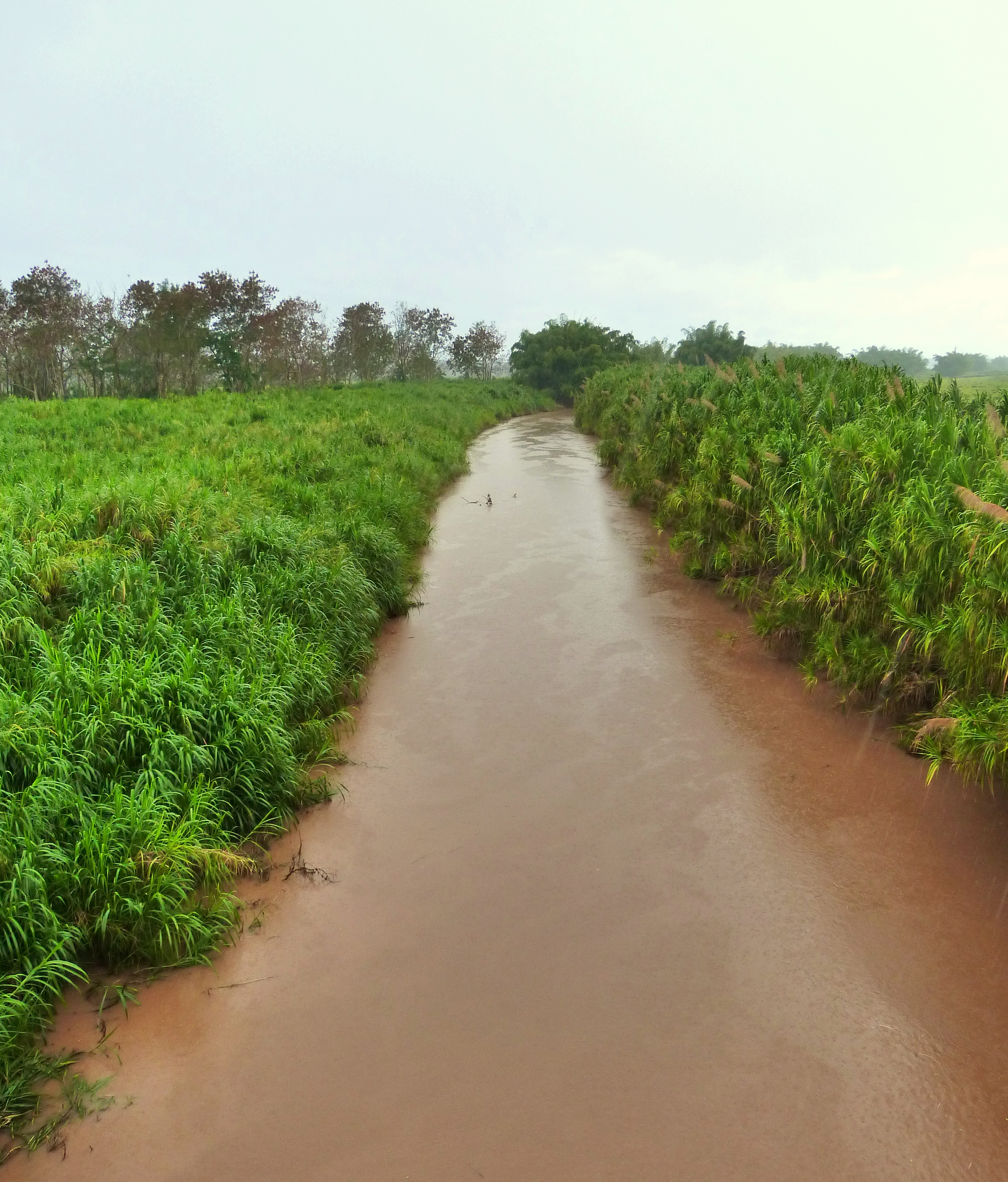
- The Río Grande de Añasco in the coastal plain, swollen by rain
- Native name: Río Guaorabo (Taino)

Location
- Commonwealth: Puerto Rico
- Municipality: Mayagüez

Physical characteristics
- Source
  - elevation: 3 ft.

The Añasco River (Spanish: Río Grande de Añasco), also known as Guacio River (particularly in San Sebastián), is a river in western Puerto Rico. Its source is in the Cordillera Central mountain range west of Adjuntas, and it flows about 40 miles (64 km) westward to its mouth on the Mona Passage 4 miles (6.4 km) north of Mayagüez. The river flows through the municipalities of Mayagüez, Añasco, San Sebastián and Las Marías. The taínos called it Río Guaorabo.

== History ==
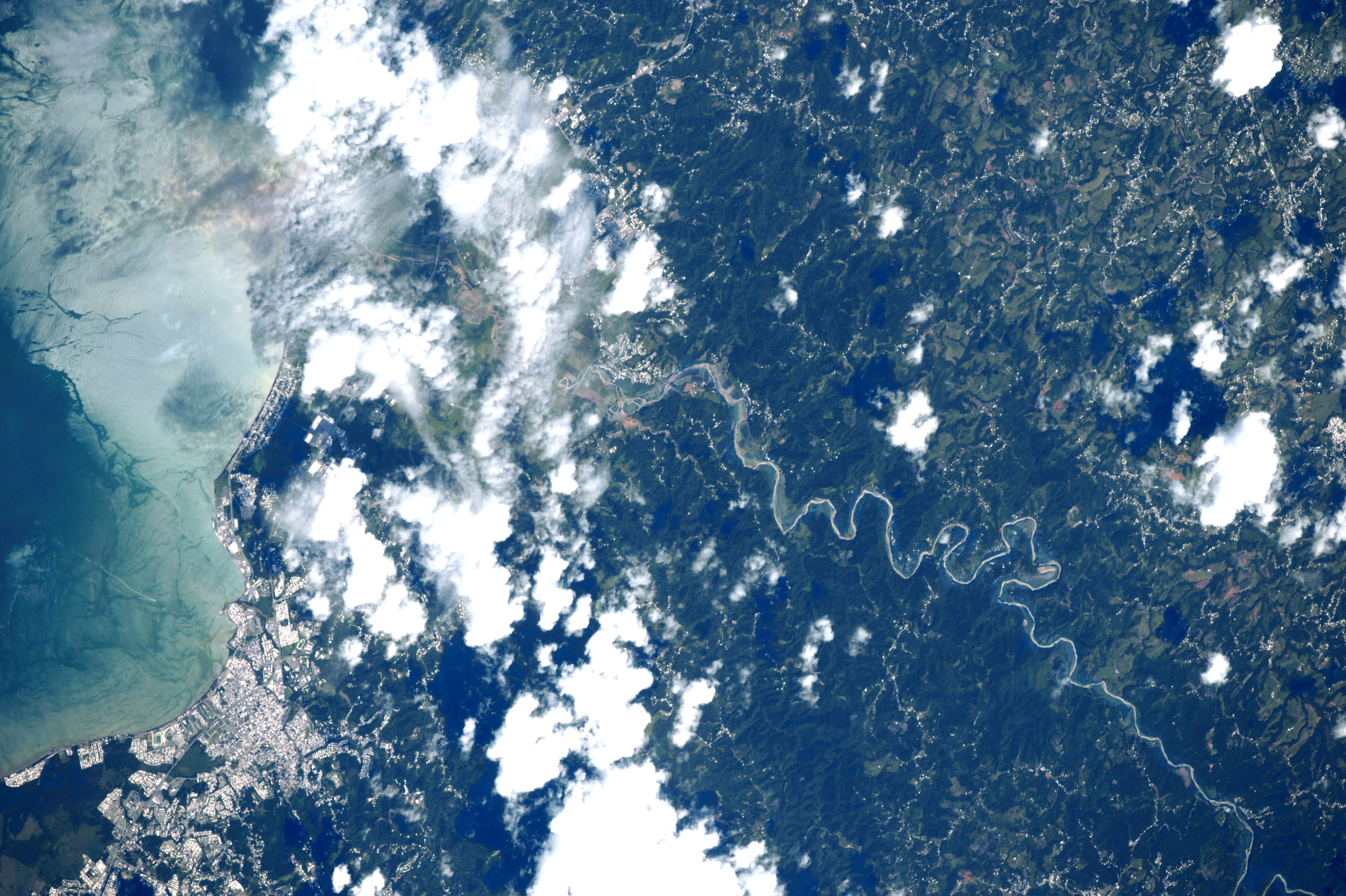
View of the river from the International Space Station. The coastal city in the left side of the photo is Mayagüez.

In the 1898 Military Notes on Puerto Rico by the U.S. it is written that the "Añasco River is formed by the Lares Mountain ridge. It rises in the eastern extremity of the mountains called Tetas de Cerro Gordo, flowing first northwest, and then west, through the town of its name and thence to the sea."

It is spanned by the Puente de Añasco, a bridge listed on the National Register of Historic Places.

== See also ==
- Puente de Añasco: NRHP listing in Añasco and Mayagüez, Puerto Rico
- List of rivers of Puerto Rico
