= Canas (Lycia) =

Former settlement in Lycia

Canas was a town of ancient Lycia.

Its site is unlocated.
