= Coen River (Costa Rica) =

River in Costa Rica

Coen River is a river of Costa Rica. Located in the east of the country, it flows north into the Telire River, which flows into the Sixaola River.
