= Pirris River =

River of Costa Rica, flowing into the Pacific Ocean

Pirris River Rio Pirris
- Location of mouth

Location
- Country: Costa Rica

Physical characteristics
- Mouth
  - location: Pacific Ocean
  - coordinates: 9°29′31″N 84°19′59″W
  - elevation: 0 m (0 ft)

Pirris River is a river of Costa Rica, flowing into the Pacific Ocean.
