= Niño River =

River in Costa Rica

Niño River is a river of Costa Rica.
