= Sibú =

Deity in Talamancan mythology

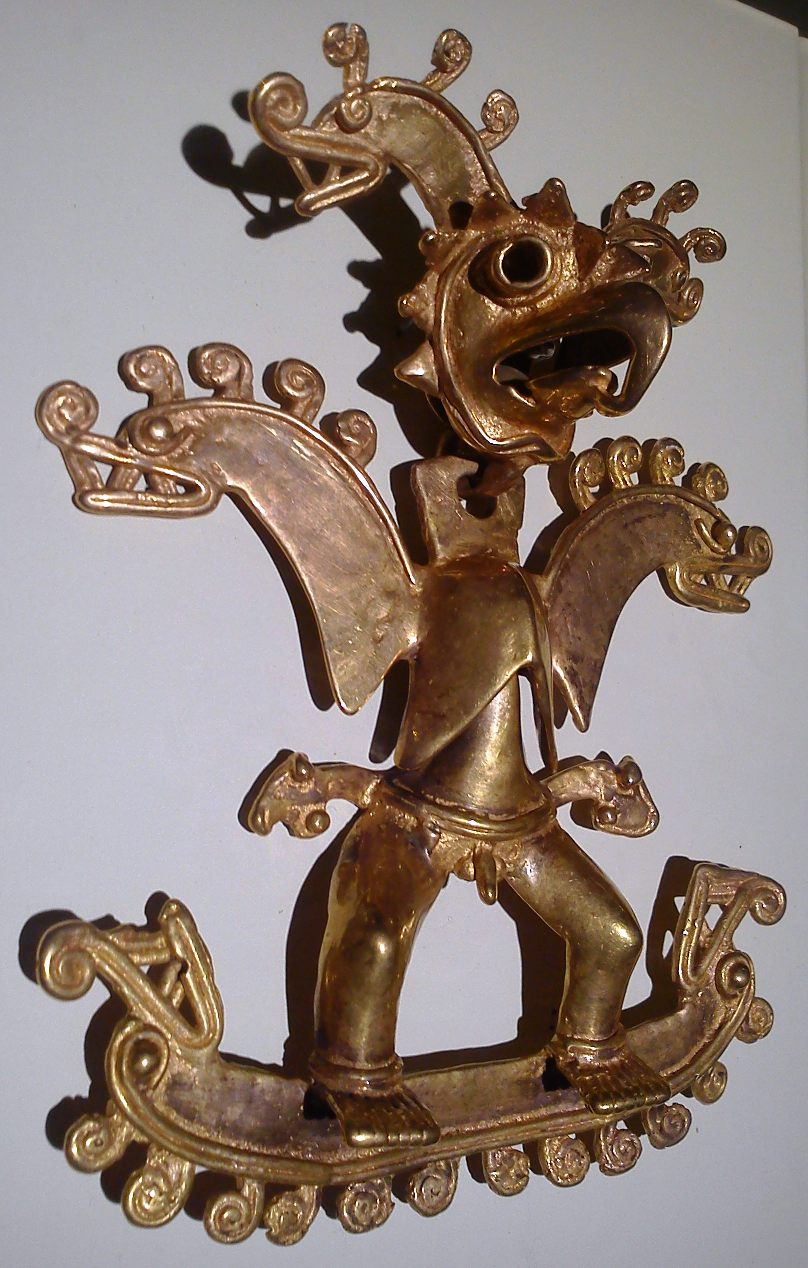
Gold figure of Sibú with head of an eagle. Pre-Columbian Gold Museum, San José, Costa Rica.

Sibú is the primary deity in the Talamancan mythology of Costa Rica. He is the creator of Earth and humanity, god of wisdom, values, and indigenous customs. He is called Sibö by the Bribri and Cabécar, Sibú by the Boruca and Spanish, and Zbö by the Naso.

Sibú is also a culture hero, who taught the Bribri and Cabécar people what foods are safe to eat, how to plant crops, set down the rules of society regarding incest, clans, and morality, and gave the Awápa (Bribri shamans) songs, ritual language, and magic stones (sĩã').

In Bribri and Cabécar culture, Sibö is seen as the "owner" or "guardian" (Bribri: wak) of humanity, as he created the first human beings out of corn seeds.

== Family ==
- Sìitami – mother of Sibú
- Sibökõmõ – father of Sibú
- Nãmãitãmĩ, also called Tapir – Sibú's sister, mother of Irìria
- Irìria, also called Sulára, la Niña Tierra, or tapir girl – Sibú's niece
- Sulá – father of Irìria, lord of the underworld
- Bikakra – grandmother of Irìria
- Sórkura or SórkuLa – grandfather (in some sources, grand-uncle) of Sibú
- Tsuru' – Sibú's wife, goddess of cacao

== Birth of Sibú ==
There are different versions about the birth of Sibú (Sibö), but all agree that, before the god came to earth, the world was ruled and inhabited by a race of devils, the Sòrburu, headed by his grandfather Sórkura. Sórkura had a son, Sibökõmõ or Sibökãmã, who was a great healer. Once, Sibökõmõ went to work as an Awá (shaman) in the lower world, that of the Sòrburu, and took with him his niece Sìitami.

=== First version: Sibö as a magic stone ===
Sibökõmõ, like all awá, possessed magical stones called sĩã' or sĩõ: three male and one female. One day, one of those male stones (which was Sibú), the one used to heal, was lost: it was inside Sìitami. Sibö did this because he knew that men could not reproduce alone.

Thus, Sibö was born, and the god thought: "I am an older person, only in a small body. I hope my mother asks my father for a little ripe banana or a bit of corn dough." And Sìitami asked Sibökõmõ to bring her those things to feed the child. Then Sibö thought: "I wish my mother would tell my father to purify me and build a small ranch near the house." So he did, and Sibökõmõ took care of the boy, and healed him for two nights while he purified him.

When Sìitami returned to the house four days later, Sibö was able to stand, and by eight days he was already a man. Then, he began to create all things.

=== Second version: The escape to Dìratuaa Lóratuaa ===
When Sibú was born, a rooster that had never sung began to sing. Then the Sòrburu knew that Sibú was born, and since they did not want anyone else there, they looked for the boy to kill him. Sìitami realized, and began to look for someone to accompany her to the higher world, which she knew from her trips with Sibökõmõ. Akura, the termite, offered to move them from one place to another by building a tunnel. Thus, the mother and child came to Dìratuaa Lóratuaa, where the house of the ants is, who hid them. There Sibú grew up.

=== Third version: The boy from the river ===
Once, Sibökõmõ went fishing with a spear, and found Sibö as a baby on the bank of a river. Then, he picked up the boy, took him to his house, and gave him to his wife Sìitami, presenting him as his son.

The child was born with a shell (in a skin bag, that is, an amniotic sac), so his father purified it; but the baby did not stop crying, although Sibökõmõ had already cut her navel and cleaned it of the impurity of the birth . The child did not want to suckle, nor eat or drink water. Then Sìitami ground cacao and put the soft dough in his mouth, which made the baby happy. With only that food Sibö grew up and managed to think of all the things in the universe.

== Myths about Sibú ==
=== The war with the Sòrburu ===
It may be difficult to understand why the Sòrburu would want to kill Sibú, them being his relatives. However, for the Bribri kinship is transmitted matrilineally, and it was Sibökomo who was related to the devils.

In the legends several reasons for the Sòrburu wanting to kill Sibö are mentioned:

- They did not want more people in their place.
- They were jealous of his power.
- They coveted his magical objects.
- They hated him because he had created the seeds (ditsö).
- They did not want him to create the world.
- They did not want him to take away the power.
- Sórkura wanted to be king of men.
- They just wanted to kill him.

In the version of Sibö's birth that talks about the flight to Dáturaa Lóratuaa, it is said that when Sibö grew up, he told his father that he wanted to return to the lower world, to meet the Sòrburu and to know why they did not believe it. Sibökomo then tells him to do it, but be careful, because they wanted to kill him. This is when Sibö returns to the lower world.

Once there, he found two Sòrburu who were working in their lands. The devils heard a strange sound, wek, wek, wek! and went to see what it was, but they did not find anyone. Hanging over a hearth was a half-cooked gray fox, the food of the Sòrburu. Then Sibö came, blew on the fox and revived it; the animal got down and began to sing and play the drum, while Sibö accompanied him playing maracas. Seeing this, the two devils left their hiding place and stabbed at Sibö with a spear, but he jumped and they could not hurt him.

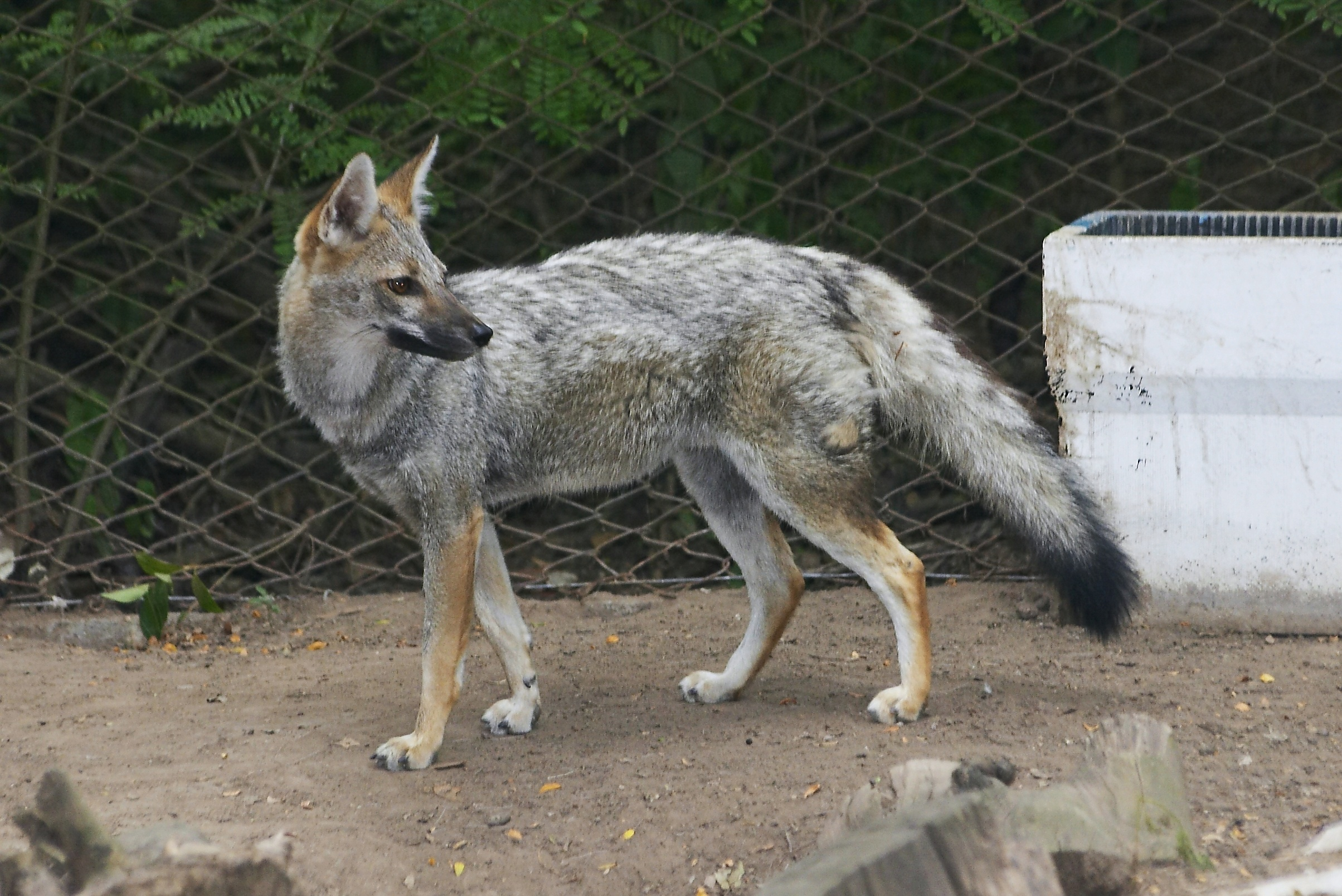
Sibú's first feat was frightening the Sòrburu by resurrecting a gray fox (Urocyon cinereoargenteus)

While they fought, the fox again hung over the stove. The Sòrburu were furious, because they believed that this was a bad omen and that they were going to die. So they grabbed the fox, chopped it up and threw it out. This is why the fox is not eaten by the Bribri. After that, Sibö spent all his time bothering the devils and making bad omens, collected in humorous tales such as those mentioned below.

=== The resurrected chicken ===
One day, Sibö was walking, blowing his conch shell and his horn, when he met the Sòrburu. The god made the devils have a vision in which he would grab some chickens, kill them, cook them and serve them for food. The devils had not recognized him, and he sat down, pretending to eat with them.

Then, one of the chickens that was already cooked got up and sang three times (which for the devils was a prophecy of death). Sibö did this because he knew they wanted to kill him, and he blew on the chicken to make it fly away.

=== The kidnapping in Sórkura's house ===
Another day, Sibú decided to let himself get caught, so he went to Sórkura's house, carrying honey, a conch, a horn, his staff, his shield and a skirt of a plant called mastate. The Sòrburu asked Sibö if he was a god, and although he denied it, the Sòrburu caught him and took his possessions. But Sibö escaped, and the next day he was transformed into a well-dressed old man. He asked the devils if it was true that they had trapped Sibö. The devils said yes, and showed him each of the things that the god had been carrying, which the old man tried out. When they reached the place where they had put Sibö, the god turned into wind and left.

=== The raid on the house of the Sòrburu ===
The Sòrburu had in their house some drums, foxes in the form of maracas and some macaws. All of these animals were dead. When the devils were out of the house, Sibö entered, resuscitated the animals and together they began to make a lot of noise: the macaws sang, the foxes played the maracas and Sibö played the drums. As the Sòrburu were nearby, they returned immediately to try to catch the god, but he had disappeared, and the macaws and foxes were dead and hung over the stove.

The next day, Sibö arrived pretending to be a visitor, and asked if it was true that the god had been there. The devils said yes, and entrusted him with their plans to kill him. Having learned their plans, Sibö let himself be caught another day, and the Sòrburu tied him up and started to shoot him, but in the night the god escaped.

=== The death of Sórkura ===
Sibö knew that Sórkura wanted to kill him, so every time he met him on the way, he became another being, sometimes a hummingbird that was flitting past the Sòrburu. The devil got fed up, and told his relatives that he was going to kill Sibö, and that when he did he would blow his horn so that they would arrive and celebrate the death of the god.

One day Sibö found himself face to face with Sórkura, who threw all his spears at him, never hitting the mark. Sibö then took one of those weapons, and on the first shot, he killed his grandfather.

Then, the god took the appearance of Sórkura, and sounded the devil's horn. At once the other Sòrburu arrived, who rejoiced, believing that it was Sibö who had died, and convinced by the god, they dismembered and roasted the corpse. Then Sibö made himself known, and threw the pieces of Sórkura into the air, where they were transformed into signs of ill omen.

=== Creation of the earth ===
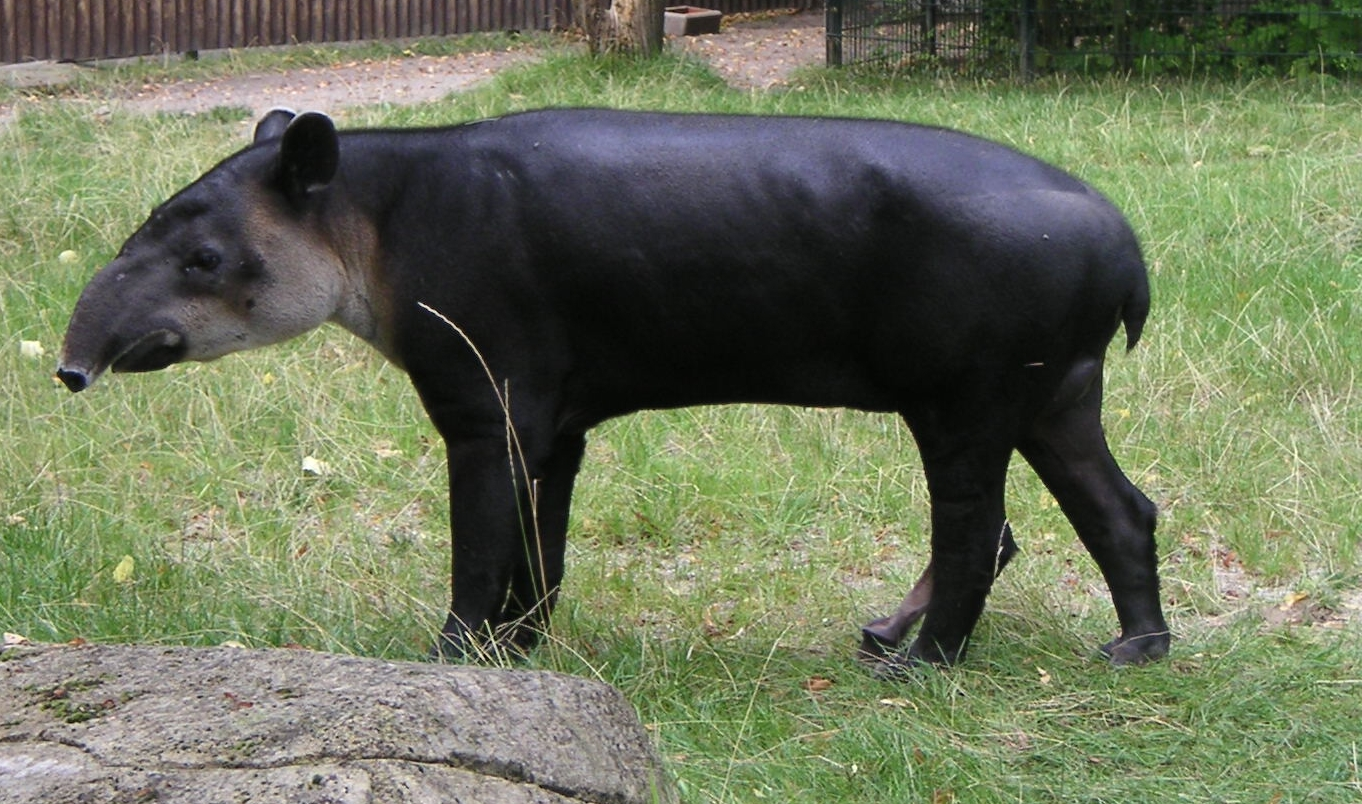
Tapirus bairdii, the only tapir species in Costa Rica

Before the creation of human beings, Sibö created the sky and the earth, but the earth was only barren rock on which nothing would grow. The Bribri creation myth relates how Sibú's sister, Nãmãitãmĩ (also called Tapir), had a daughter named Irìria. Sibú sent Dukúr Bulu, a vampire bat, to bite Irìria to see if she could become the earth. When Dukúr Bulu returned to Sibú, his excrement began to grow vines and bushes, indicating that Sibú's plan would work. Sibú sent the bat a second time to suck the blood of Irìria, and again the bat's excrement grew trees.

The third time that Sibú sent Dukúr Bulu, the King of Pita (Agave americana) was waiting for him, transformed into a fine thread across the doorway. When Dukúr Bulu flew into the room where Irìria was sleeping, the thread cut him in two. His top half (with the head and wings) flew back to Sibú, who wrapped the wound with cotton, blew on it, and advised Dukúr Bulu to hang upside-down to heal more quickly.

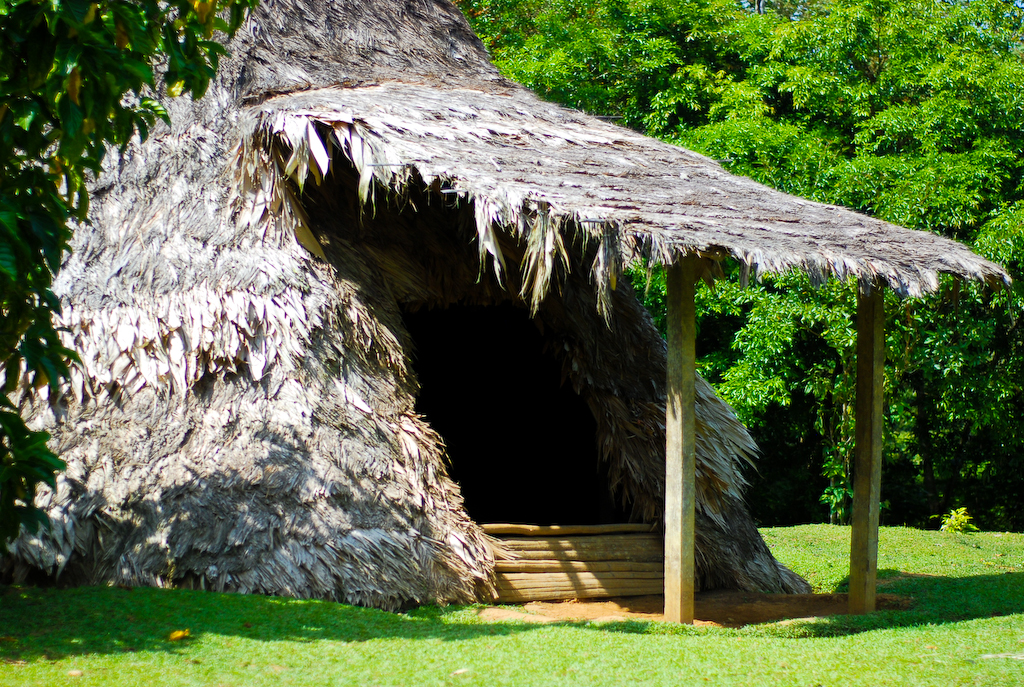
A traditional Bribri palenque. Talamanca, Costa Rica.

Sibú sent his peón (servant) to visit the tapir family and invite them to a festival, but they refused to come until Sibú came to invite them in person. Sibú invited Bikakra, Iriria's grandmother, to perform corn and chocolate ceremonies at a festival to inaugurate a great conical house for the clans at Suláyum, the center of the world to the Bribri people. He also invited the devils to dance the Sorbón dance, since they had helped in the building of the house.

At the festival, everyone danced the Sorbón. During the fourth dance, Irìria fell to the ground and her blood spilled across the floor. All the devils danced on her body and trampled her until she became pure earth.

In another myth, Sibú planned to marry off his sister in exchange for a wife of his own, but she refused. Sibú sent some of her spirit to earth for the Bribri to hunt. Because of this, the Bribri consider the tapir a sacred animal and only consume it in special rituals.

=== Creation of Human Beings ===
Sibö had brought seeds of corn from suLa'kaska, The Place of Destiny. The seeds were different colors, which is why the indigenous peoples of Talamanca have different skin tones. Sibö kept the corn seeds in a basket, and gave different names to the different seeds, which became the names of clans. Later he divided the seeds into groups, and warned that people should not marry within their own clan. He also taught some to be awápa (shamans), and others to be bikákla, stsököl, and ókum, the officiants of funeral ceremonies.

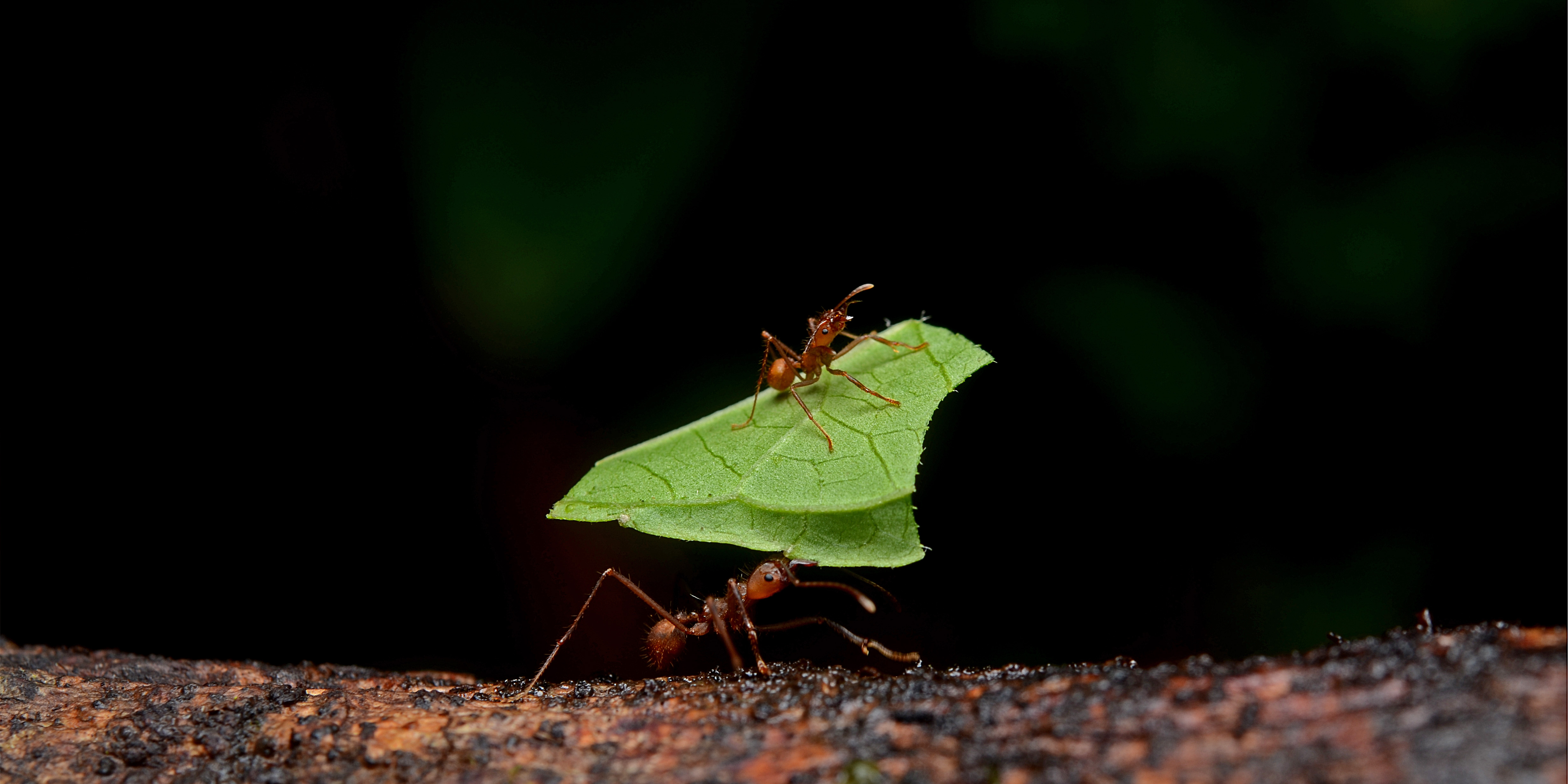
The Bribri relate that Sibö created white people, síkwa, from the plékeköL (leafcutter ants).

Sibö told the people that he would also create white people, called síkwa, from the plékeköL (leafcutter ants). PlékeköL was Sibö's relative, the King of the Leaf-cutter Ants, and white people originated from him. Sibö created indigenous people at night, but created white people during the day. Some Bribri say that this is why white people are "more scientific", because Sibö taught them different things than the indigenous people. However, like the leafcutter ants, the white people cut down and destroy everything in their path, leaving no vegetation behind.

==== The UsekLa Clan ====
In ancient times, all of Sibö's relatives were allowed to eat Sibö's possessions on Earth, including the indigenous people. To protect his people, Sibö gave them the UsekLa clan, celestial beings from another world, not made from corn like the other people. Sibö gave them magic stones to cure illnesses, and they fought against the Owners of diseases, plagues, hunger, and storms. The Bribri say that they were unable to defeat the Owners of the flu, measles, and the common cold, however, explaining why so many indigenous peoples died from introduced diseases after the Columbian exchange.

The only ones allowed to interact with the UsekLa were men of the royal Salkwak clan, who acted as intermediaries between the UsekLa and the rest of the people.

=== Creation of the SiaköLdi ===
The Bribri people of the Kéköldi reserve in Talamanca relate a story about the creation of the Siaköldi, a branch of the Kéköldi River: When Sibú was walking by the creek, carrying cassava dough to make chicha, he became tired. He used the water of the creek to wet the dough and make chicha to refresh himself. He threw the cassava pulp into the creek, where it turned into sacred white stones called sĩã'.

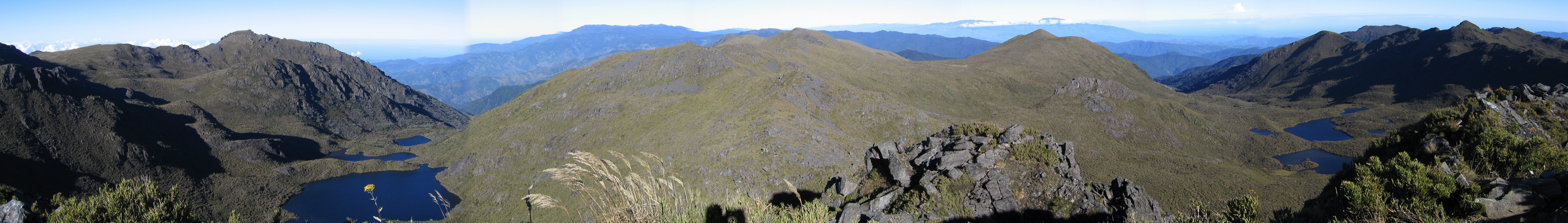
Mount Chirripó, the highest mountain in Costa Rica (3,821 m), is considered the home of Sibú by the Bribri.

== Sources ==
- Palmer, Paula; Sánchez, Juanita; Mayorga, Gloria (1993). Taking Care of Sibö's Gifts: An Environmental Treatise from Costa Rica's KéköLdi Indigenous Reserve. San José, Costa Rica: Asociación de Desarrollo Integral de la Reserva Indígena Cocles/KéköLdi. pp. 15–16, 41. ISBN 9977-88-019-0.
