= Cañas River (Tempisque River tributary) =

River in Costa Rica

Cañas River is a river of Costa Rica. It is a tributary of the Tempisque River.
