= Suerte River =

River in Costa Rica

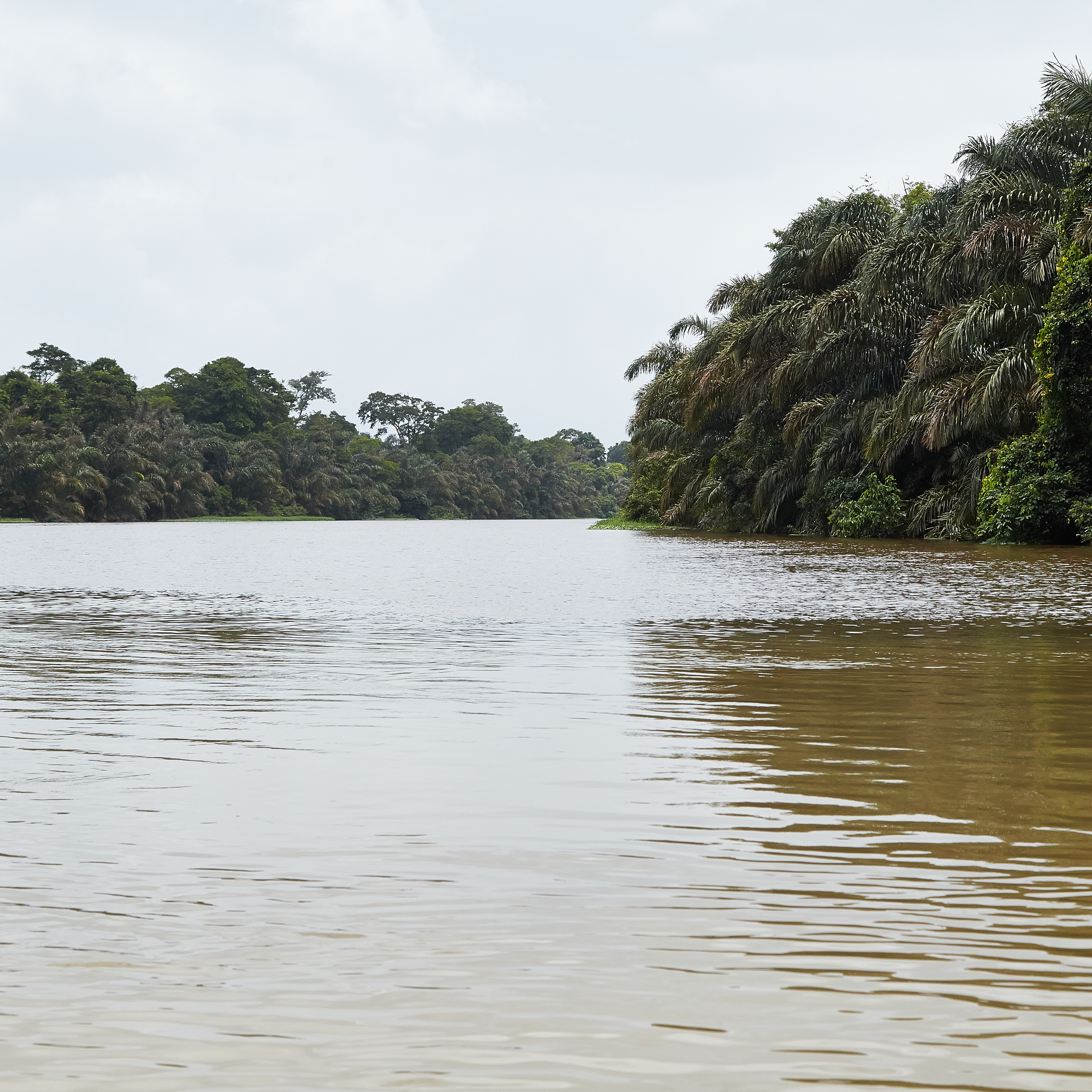
Suerte River

Suerte River (other names include Caño de La Suerte, Rio Suerte, Río La Suerte) is a river of Costa Rica. It flows through the lowland Caribbean rainforest and agricultural plantations, joins up with the Rio Tortuguero, which flows through the canals of Tortuguero National Park, emptying into the Caribbean Ocean. The river also flows through La Suerte Biological Station, a property belonging to the Maderas Rainforest Conservancy.
