= Tenorio Volcano =

Volcano in Costa Rica

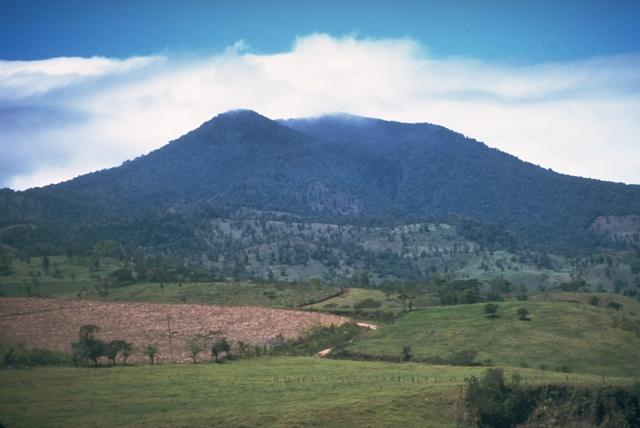
- Tenorio volcano.

Highest point
- Elevation: 1,916 m (6,286 ft)
- Coordinates: 10°40′22″N 85°00′54″W

Geography
- Location within Costa Rica
- Location: Border between Alajuela Province and Guanacaste Province, Costa Rica

Geology
- Mountain type: Stratovolcano
- Volcanic arc: Central America Volcanic Arc

Tenorio Volcano (Spanish: Volcán Tenorio) is an inactive andesitic stratovolcano in the southeasternmost part of the Cordillera de Guanacaste volcanic mountain range in northwestern Costa Rica. It is the main geographical feature of the eponymous Tenorio Volcano National Park.

== Geology ==
It is composed of four volcanic peaks and twin craters Tenorio and Montezuma. The formation occupies 225 square kilometres (87 sq mi).

Tenorio, the principal peak, has three craters in the central cone, while Montezuma, to the north, has two. Tenorio's summit is 1,916 metres (6,286 ft) high, while Montezuma's is 1,513 metres (4,964 ft). Lava flows descend to the northeast from Tenorio's northwestern-to-southwestern flank. The Biguana lava domes lie on the northern flank at 700 metres (2,300 ft). The volcanic cones Cerro Barrera and Olla de Carne are at elevations of 720 metres (2,360 ft) and 454 metres (1,490 ft), respectively. The southeastern flank features a number of small, inactive parasitic cones.

There are no known eruptions during the Holocene epoch (about 11,700 years ago to the present). Weak earthquakes were detected in 1997 and 1998, the latter consisting of 170 with magnitudes ranging from 0.9 to 3.3.

== Feasibility of geothermal power generation ==
The Instituto Costarricense de Electricidad (Costa Rican Institute of Electricity) conducted an evaluation of the country's geothermal resources between November 1987 and October 1988; Tenorio was selected as one of three high-priority areas. In 1999–2000, two exploratory wells were dug to evaluate its potential as a source of geothermal power, with disappointing results.
