= Telire River =

Location
- Country: Costa Rica
- Province: Limón

Physical characteristics
- Mouth
  - location: Sixaola River
  - coordinates: 9°33′34″N 82°53′09″W

Basin features
- River system: Sixaola

The Telire River is a river in Costa Rica located in the province of Limón, in the eastern part of the country. The confluence of Telire with the Yorkin River creates the Sixaola, which is part of the border between Costa Rica and Panama.

A rainforest climate prevails in the area. The average annual temperature is 22 °C. The warmest month is October, when the average temperature is 22 °C, and the coldest is January, at 19 °C. The average annual average is 2 550 millimeters. The rainiest month is July, with an average of 434 mm of precipitation, and the driest is February, with 75 mm of rain.
