= Bebedero River =

Costa Rican river

Location
- Country: Costa Rica

Physical characteristics
- Source: Tenorio Volcano
- Mouth: Tempisque River
- Length: 40 km (25 mi)

Basin features
- Notable fauna: Boat-billed heron, American crocodile, green iguana, howler monkeys

Bebedero River is a river of Costa Rica. The length of the Bebedero River is 40 km (25 mi) and originates from Tenorio Volcano.

== Fauna ==
Bebedero river's fauna consists of the boat billed night heron, American crocodile, green iguana, little blue heron juvenile, little blue heron and howler monkeys.
