= List of power stations in Panama =

The following page lists some power stations in Panama.

== Hydroelectric ==
| Station | River | Coordinates | Type | Capacity (MW) | Year commissioned | Owner |
|---|---|---|---|---|---|---|
| Baitun Dam | Chiriquí Viejo | 8.660271°N 82.818053°W | Run-of-the-river | 85.9 | 2012 | Ideal Panamá, S.A. |
| Bajo de Mina Dam | Chiriquí Viejo | 8.716470°N 82.832644°W | Run-of-the-river | 56.8 | 2011 | Ideal Panamá, S.A. |
| Barro Blanco Dam | Tabasara | 8.215133°N 81.594059°W | Conventional | 26.80 | 2017 | Lufussa Genisa; Generador del Isthmo S.A. |
| Bayano Dam | Bayano | 9.176897°N 78.884389°W | Conventional | 260 | 1976 | AES Corporation; AES Panama S.A. |
| Bonyic Dam | Bonyic | 9°19′28.74″N 82°38′28.7″W | Conventional | 31.31 | 2014 | Empresas Públicas de Medellín |
| Changuinola Dam | Changuinola | 9.236231°N 82.494621°W | Conventional | 223 | 2011 | AES Panama |
| Estí Dam | Chiriquí | 8.615442°N 82.351794°W / 8.584379°N 82.315949°W | Conventional | 120 | 2003 | AES Panama S.A. |
| Fortuna Dam | Chiriquí | 8.744551°N 82.248952°W | Conventional | 300 | 1984 | ENEL Fortuna, S.A. |
| Gatun Dam | Chagres | 9.262683°N 79.930000°W | Conventional | 24 | 1913 | Autoridad del Canal de Panamá |
| La Estrella Dam | Caldera | 8.740898°N 82.421671°W | Conventional | 47.2 | 1979 | AES Panama S.A. |
| Los Valles Dam | Los Valles | 8.716484°N 82.364344°W | Conventional | 54.76 | 1979 | AES Panama S.A. |
| Madden Dam | Chagres | 9.211365°N 79.616311°W | Conventional | 36 | 1935 | Autoridad del Canal de Panamá |
| Macho de Monte Dam | Macho de Monte | 8.687590°N 82.608967°W | Run-of-the-river | 2.5 | 1939 | Energía y Servicios de Panamá, S.A. (ESEPSA) |
| El Alto Dam | Chiriquí Viejo | 8.727940°N 82.836125°W | Conventional | 72 | - | Panamá Power Holdings, Inc. |
| Lorena Dam | Estí | 8.455282°N 82.333203°W | Run-of-the-river | 37.60 | - | Alternegy, S.A. |
| Prudencia | Esti, Cochea & Papayal | 8.423812°N 82.343886°W | Run-of-the-river | 62.78 | 2011 | Alternegy, S.A. |
| Gualaca | Estí | 8.502771°N 82.299933°W | Run-of-the-river | 25.6 | - | Bontex, S.A. |
| Mendre I | Chiriquí | 8.648558°N 82.350335°W | Run-of-the-river | 19.75 | 2011 | Caldera Energy Corp. |
| Mendre II | Chiriquí | 8.629354°N 82.360940°W | Run-of-the-river | 8.12 | - | Caldera Energy Corp. |
| Las Cruces | San Pablo | 8.322638°N 81.270617°W | Run-of-the-river | 19.47 | 2015 | Corporación de Energía del Istmo Ltd. |
| San Andres | Caña Blanca & Quebrada La Paja | 8.668141°N 82.817168°W | Run-of-the-river | 9.89 | - | Desarrollos Hidroeléctricos Corp. |
| Pando | Chiriquí Viejo | 8.803270°N 82.743718°W | Run-of-the-river | 32.6 | 2020 | Electron Investment S.A. (EISA) |

As of April 2026, 46 concessions have been granted for the operation of a hydroelectric power station in Panama. 45 of the projects are operating commercially, one is undergoing testing.

== Thermal ==
| Station | Location | Coordinates | Type | Capacity (MW) | Year commissioned | Owner |
|---|---|---|---|---|---|---|
| Cobre Power Plant | Punta Rincon, Donoso, Colón | - | Coal-fired power station | 300 | 2019 | First Quantum Minerals |
| AES Colón I | Cativa, Colón, Colón | - | Bunker oil | 72 | 2015 | AES Panama S.A. |
| AES Colón II | Colón, Colón, Colón | - | Gas | 381 | 2018 | AES Panama S.A. |

== See also ==
- List of largest power stations in the world
