= Bayano (disambiguation) =

Bayano may refer to:

- Bayano, leader of a slave revolt in Panama
- Bayano Wars, slave revolt in Panama
- Bayano, Los Santos, corregimiento in Panama
- Bayano River, river in Panama
- Bayano Lake, lake in Panama
- HMS Bayano (1914), banana boat
