= Francis Drake's expedition of 1572–1573 =

Caribbean trip by the English explorer

Drake's expedition of 1572–1573
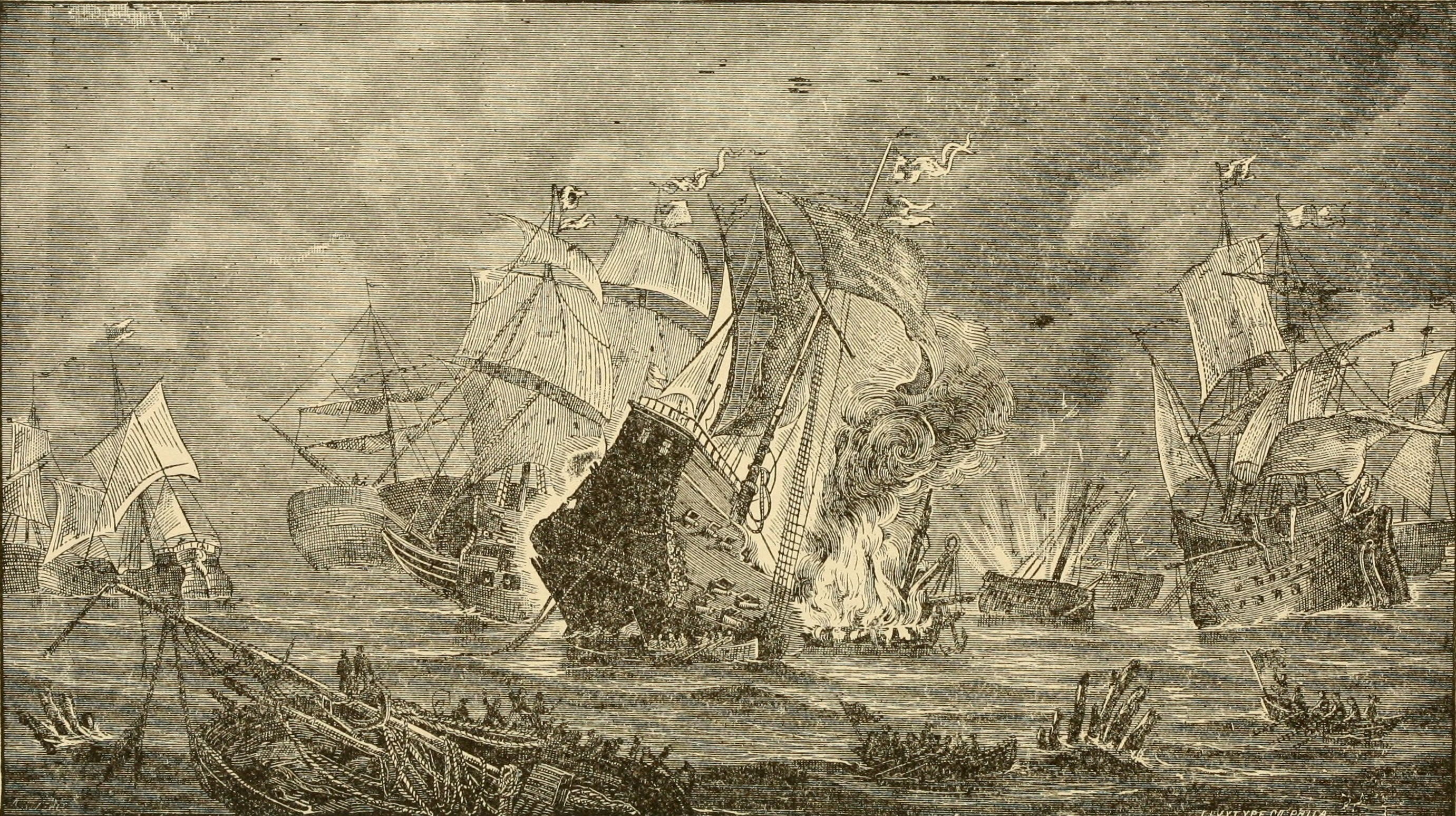
- Francis Drake in Central America, 1573
Date	24 May 1572 – 6 August 1573
Location	Caribbean 13°N 79°W
Result	Anglo-French privateer victory

Belligerents
England; France; Cimarrons	Spanish America; Spanish Main

Commanders and leaders
English; Francis Drake; John Drake †; Joseph Drake #; John Oxenham; Ellis Hixom (Note: Also surnamed Hickson.); James Raunce (Note: Also surnamed Raunse, Rance, Ranse.); John Overy; French; Guillaume Le Testu †; Cimarrons; Pedro Mandingo (Note: Also Chief Pedro. Also surnamed Mandiga, Mandinga. A Cimarron chief.)	Luís de Rojas (Note: A Spanish governor.); Francisco Bahamonde de Lugo; Álvaro de Mendoza; Martín de Mendoza; Antonio Juárez de la Concha; Jorge Nuñez de Prado; Juan Juárez de Castilla; Nicolás López; Cristóbal Monte; Anton Couto

Units involved
English; Pascha (Note: Also Pascha, Pasca, Pasco. Vessel of 70 tons with 47 crewmen originally aboard, Francis Drake captain.); Swan (Note: Also Swanlet. Vessel of 25 tons with 26 crewmen originally aboard, John Drake captain.); 3 pinnaces (Note: The Lion, Bear, Minion. Pinnaces of circa 20 tons.); 1 barque (Note: With 30 crewmen originally aboard, James Raunce captain, John Overy master.); French; Havre (Note: Also New Haven. French vessel of 80 tons with 70 crewmen originally aboard, Guillaume Le Testu captain.); Cimarrons; some small craft (Note: With 30 Cimarron men originally aboard.)	Santa Catalina (Note: Anton Couto captain.); Various infantry units; Various naval units

Strength
203 men (Note: Combined strength of units involved in 1572 to 1573. Equivalent value for units involved in 1572 is 103 men, and in 1573 is 173 men.)	undetermined (Note: At least 40 to 50 men for some engagements.)

Casualties and losses
> 4 killed; > 30 deaths (of illness); various wounded; 1 to 3 detained	11 to 14 killed; various wounded; > 14 vessels seized (Note: And their cargo seized and crews detained, pressed or marooned.); > 6 settlements raided; c. 100,000 pesos in gold lost

Elizabethan sea dog Sir Francis Drake undertook an unauthorised privateering expedition to the Spanish Main, in what is now the western and southern Caribbean, in 1572 and 1573, driven by the exorbitant success of his prior visit in 1571. The English sea captain embarked from Plymouth in May 1572, and returned in August 1573, laden with treasure worth some £20,000 or more, most of it secured during a joint ambush, with French corsair Guillaume Le Testu and Cimarron chief Pedro Mandingo, of the Spanish silver train as it crossed the isthmus along the Camino Real to Nombre de Dios in April 1573. The voyage was mainly spent on the shores and waters of the Main, though, rather than upcountry, as the pirates most often went about raiding coastal settlements and seizing merchant vessels, from as far east as Curaçao, off Spanish Venezuela, to as far west and north as either the Mosquito Shore (in Veragua) or Bonacca (off Spanish Honduras). The undertaking cost Drake more than half his crew, largely due to some tropical disease, including his brothers John and Joseph Drake. It also resulted in the death of Le Testu, and in Spanish retaliation against the Cimarrons near Panama.

This voyage is deemed a precursor to hostilities of the subsequent Anglo-Spanish War of 1585–1604. It is considered Drake's first independent excursion by specialist historian Irene A. Wright, and thought to have involved a couple of English firsts, such as the first sighting of the South Sea by any Englishman, and the earliest cruise in Honduran waters by any English pirate.

== Background ==
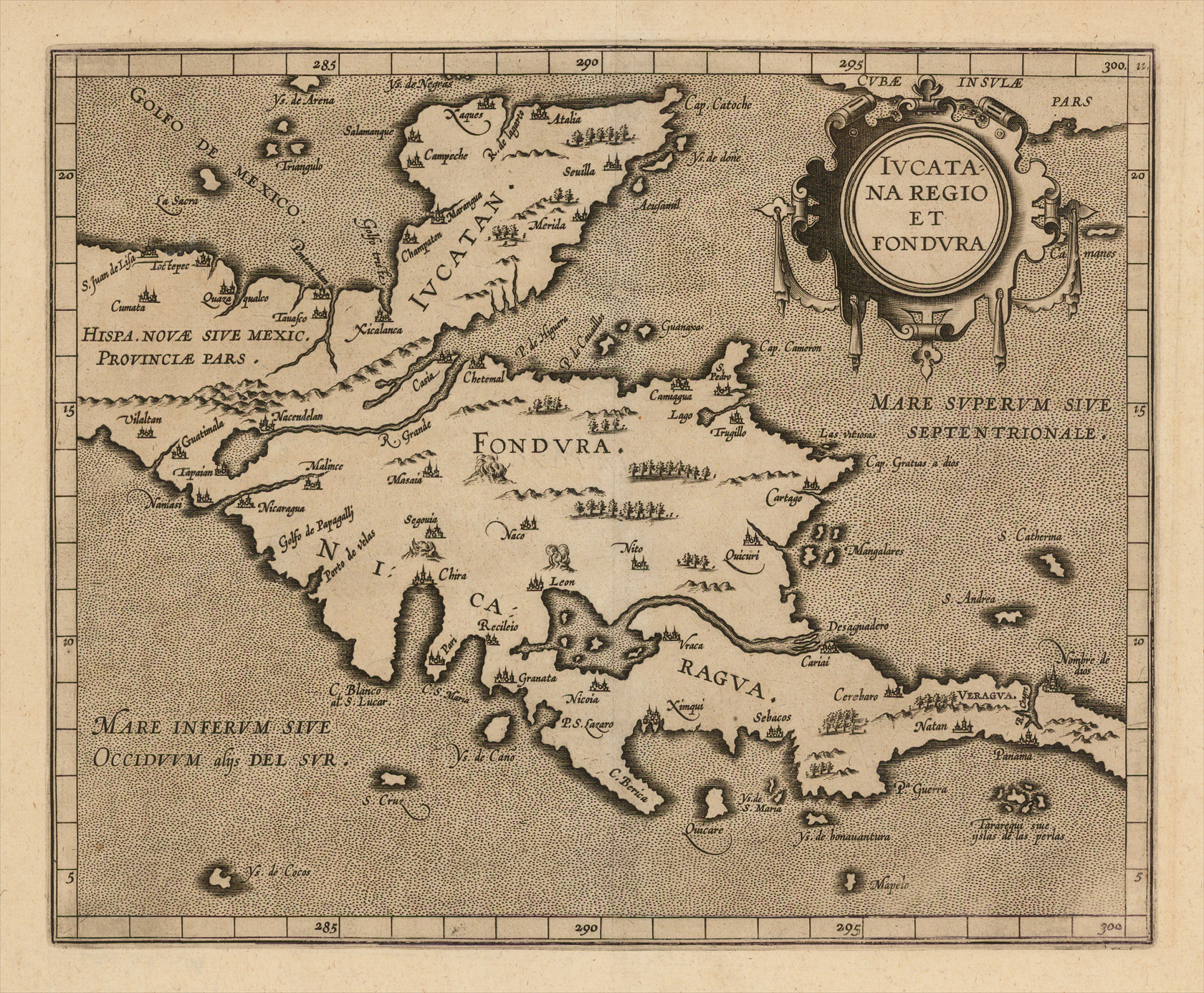
Western and southern Caribbean in the late 16th century, from Yucatan (top of top map) to the Orinoco delta (centre of bottom map); various relevant toponyms charted

In 1571, Francis Drake returned to Plymouth after what American historian Irene A. Wright reckons was the sea dog's fifth voyage to the West Indies. This trip proved wildly successful for Drake and his crew, profiting them over £100,000 (worth some £23.82 million today), a good portion of which may have been in plunder from Nombre de Dios, whose capture Wright suspects had been the primary objective. Naturally, the captain made haste in making preparations for a return (sixth) expedition to the Caribbean. He was soon joined by his brothers John and Joseph Drake, and eventually they had acquired, outfitted and manned the light ships Pascha and Swan for their crossing.

== Expedition ==
In 1572, the Pascha and Swan embarked from Plymouth in late May, and sighted southern Dominica on 29 June. Being in some need of provisions, Drake took a day or two to water the ships here, and on 1 July set course for their intended destination, a small secluded cove in the Darien Gap, some 35 leagues across the gulf from Tolu, known to the captain as Port Pheasant and identified in literature as Zapzurro Cove. They made landfall here in eleven days, and were next joined by James Raunce (in his barque of 30 crew) on 13 July.

=== Nombre de Dios, 1572 ===
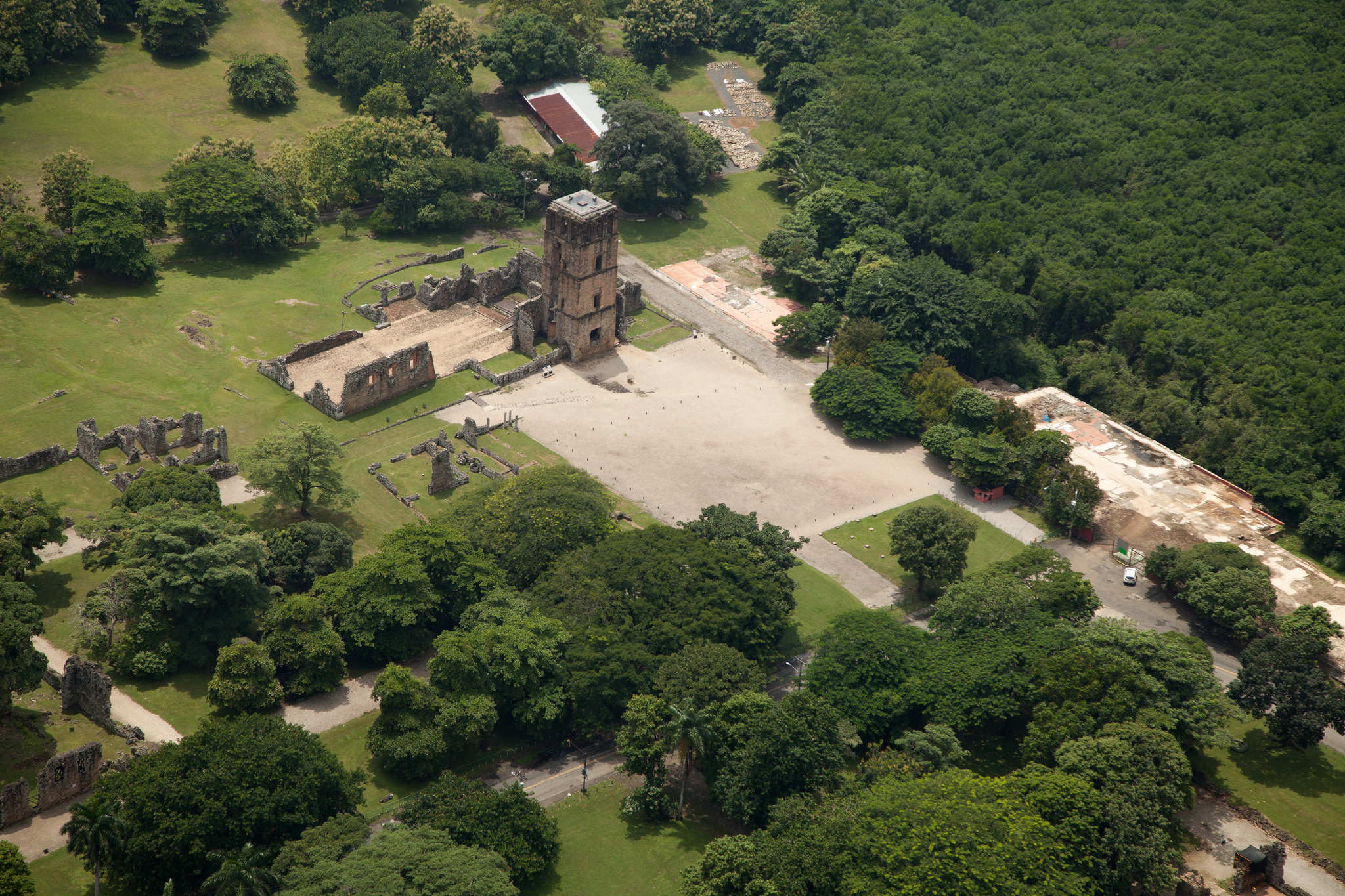
Ruins of the main plaza (centre) in Panama Viejo, facing the parish church (top); Nombre de Dios's may have been a typical Spanish plaza like this one

At Port Pheasant, Drake and Raunce's first order of business was to assemble the former's small pinnaces Lion, Bear and Minion (brought in dismantled kits from Plymouth), and to erect a rude log fort.

On 20 July, with the fort and pinnaces completed, the Drake–Raunce flotilla set sail for Isla de Pinos, off the port of Nombre de Dios, where they sighted and seized two Spanish frigates. The frigates' (enslaved) sailors brought the privateers up to date with fresh intelligence regarding the said port, whereupon Drake (with 53 of his men aboard the three pinnaces) and Raunce (with 20 of his men aboard a Spanish prize shallop) carried on to Nombre de Dios, making landfall in the evening of 29 July.

At 3:00 am that night, the men stole into the Spanish port on rowboats, but were soon discovered by a 60-ton Spanish merchantman in the harbour. The privateers, nonetheless, managed a quiet landing, and took the town's six-gun battery without opposition. They now began dismounting its ordnance, but raised a bit more ruckus than expected, and thereby roused some of the closer Spanish vecinos. At this point, the Spanish rang their warning bells and beat their war drums, jolting all vecinos to Nombre de Dios's defence, whereupon Drake and Raunce split their company. A dozen men were left on shore to guard their retreat, whilst the rest carried on to the villa's plaza, where John Oxenham and 16 others were to surreptitously circle behind it as Drake and Raunce led the rest (46 men) in a boisterous parade up the main thoroughfare to the plaza. The latter were there greeted by armed vecinos who opposed them with "a jolly hot volley of shot", but the Spanish were eventually defeated and scattered. Drake and Raunce, then, captured Nombre de Dios and set out to plunder it (the treasury, in particular), but a sudden rainstorm drenched the men's match and powder, whilst at the same time, Drake fainted from loss of blood, having sustained a gunshot during the earlier Spanish volley. Consequently, the privateers rather made a hasty retreat to Bastimentos, a nearby island to the north-east, at daybreak on 30 July.

=== Spanish Main, 1572 ===
Drake was still recuperating from the said skirmish in Bastimentos by 6 August, when Raunce took his leave. As he was in fighting shape within the week, the captain (with his 73 men, including Oxenham) now set out to the Spanish Main, (Note: Meaning the Main in its strict sense, from Rio Belen to the Orinoco only.) and sighted Carthagena on the evening of 13 August. That night, they commandeered the Pasha, a 240-ton Spanish merchantman, and followed this by seizing two other Spanish merchant ships the next day. As the crew were now stretched thin across two ships, three pinnaces, and three Spanish prizes, Drake burnt one of the prizes, and scuttled the Swan.

Shortly thereafter, the flotilla anchored in the Gulf of San Blas, just off a point christened Port Plenty (Note: Also (or rather) Fort Diego in. Camp situated on Slaughter Island in, or possibly in one of the San Blas Islands.) by Drake. The men disembarked and set up camp here. From this base, the privateers spent the next five or six weeks raiding settlements along the Main, as far east as Santa Marta, just across the bay from the Magdalena River, whilst John Drake endeavoured to befriend the nearby Cimarrons.

By 24 September, John had secured an alliance with the Cimarrons, so Drake now relocated their camp to some undetermined site nearby, likewise dubbed Port Plenty, and spent the next two weeks fortifying it. On 7 October, the privateers were once more cruising off Carthagena. On 17 October, Oxenham and the Swan seized a 50-ton Spanish barque, marooning her crew of ten men and five slaves. On 20 October, the privateers intercepted two Spanish merchants (58 and 12 tons), and likewise stranded their crews. Drake was first opposed on the dawn of 22 October, when Carthagenan authorities finally sent two armed frigates to engage and capture him. The Spanish engaged the privateers but, in the end, could not corner their vessels nor capture the crewmen. Drake nonetheless quit Carthagena on 3 November, and set off due north-east to the Magdalena, to restock their now-dangerously dwindling provisions.

The privateers reached the Magdalena on 5 November, but soon discovered that its settlements had been deserted and the livestock driven inland (Spanish authorities having forwarned the vecinos). They carried on east to Santa Marta, arriving within a week. Here, they also found the Spanish at the ready for them, as they were prevented from watering by hidden marksmen on shore. On 12 November, the Englishmen captured a 90-ton Spanish supply ship laden with victuals, and held the crew for one day. They next set for Curaçao, landing there on 13 November. A couple of days later, Drake sent Oxenham (on the Minion) ahead to Port Plenty, to advise the men left behind of his imminent return, while he scoured the Main on his own pinnace and Spanish prize. Having refreshed themselves for a few days, Drake now renewed his raids along the Main, while the Minion arrived at home base.

Drake followed Oxenham to Port Plenty within the fortnight. Upon his 27 November arrival, he discovered his brother John had died. Drake now decided to postpone further raids, so as to renew his efforts upon the Spanish treasure train the coming year. His remaining brother, Joseph, succumbed to a fatal tropical fever that December.

=== Venta Cruces, 1573 ===
Routes run by the Spanish silver train in the 16th century: Camino Real (to Portobelo) Camino Real (to Nombre de Dios) Las Cruces Trail (river leg to Chagres) Las Cruces Trail (jungle leg to Las Cruces)

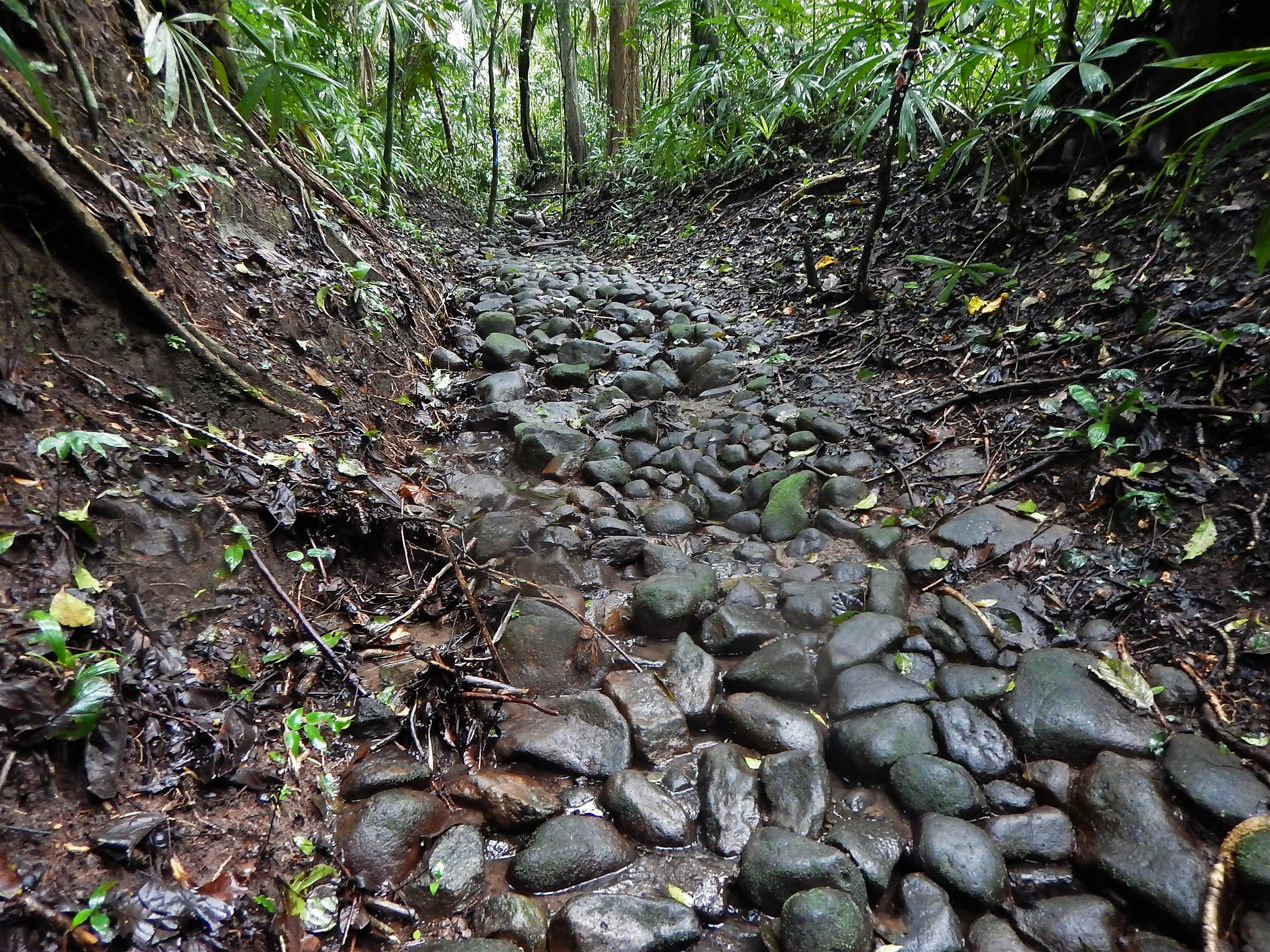
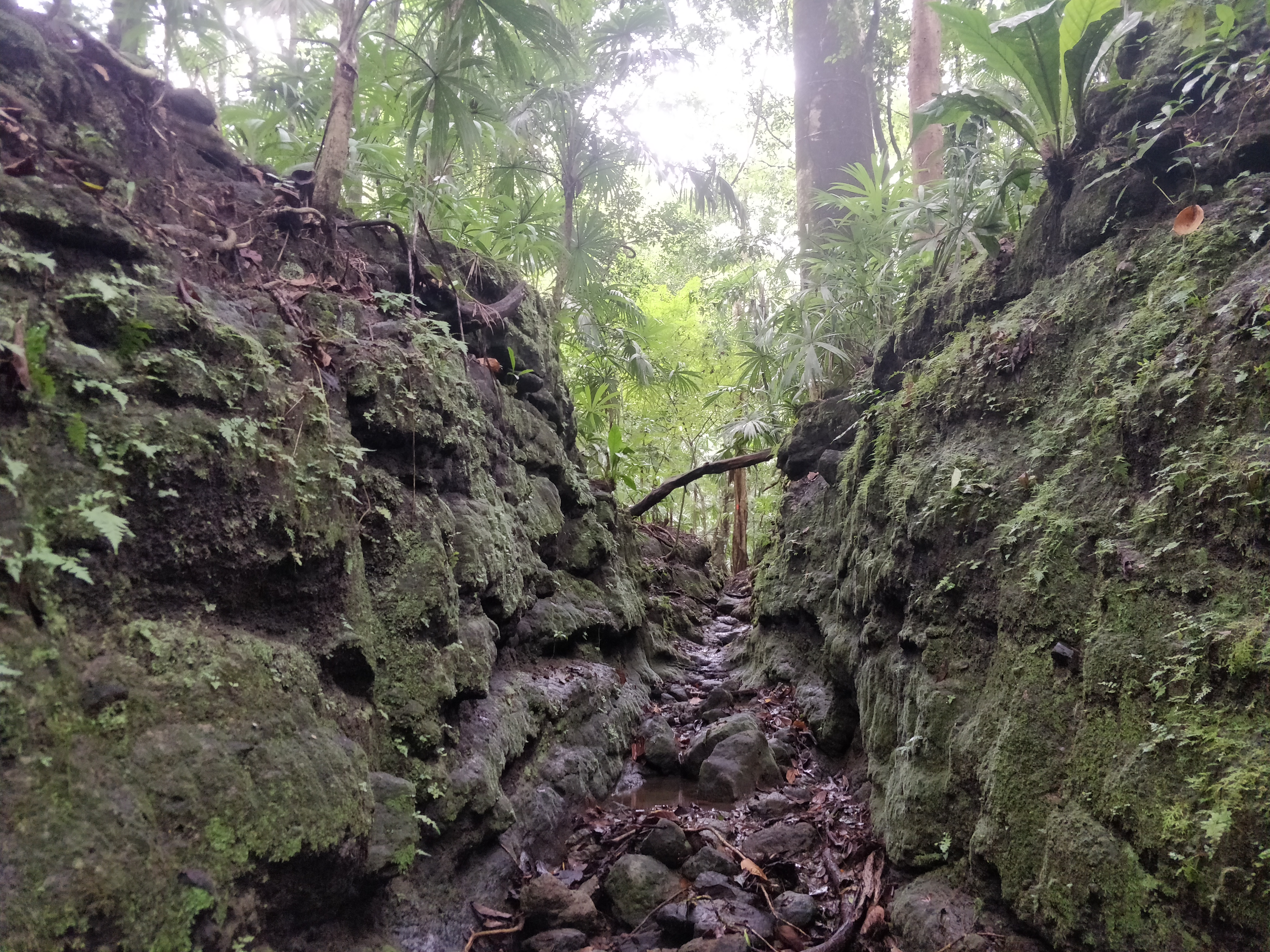
Drake set a trap for the Spanish silver train on the Las Cruces Trail (jungle leg pictured) in February 1573

On 30 January, having been apprised of the Spanish plate fleet's arrival by Cimarron allies, the Lion was despatched to reconnoitre the shipping off Nombre de Dios, during which cruise she intercepted a Spanish frigate in the harbour, whose crew confirmed the Cimarrons' intelligence. Consequently, on 3 February, Drake and Oxenham (with 16 Englishmen) and chief Pedro Mandingo (with 30 Cimarron men) trudged south through the hills and jungle of the Chagres Highlands, across the isthmus to the South Sea port of Panama, so as to intercept the treasure train expected to soon head out due north of there, via either the Camino Real or Las Cruces Trail. On 14 February, the party finally sighted Panama, whereupon a Cimarron in disguise slipped into the city, returning that evening with news of the impending arrival of a 14-mule train from Lima, bound for Nombre de Dios via Venta Cruces. (Note: Also Las Cruces, Venta de Cruces. On the Chagres River, a few miles near modern Gamboa.) With the route thus confirmed, Drake now headed to the Las Cruces Trail, hoping to ambush the train as it approached the Chagres River, but an unrelated Spanish traveller on the trail soon discovered the trap (upon coming across a drunken crewman, Robert Pike) and warned the authorities, who naturally stalled the train. The privateers nonetheless managed to seize a few Spanish silver-loaded mules, after which they made a hasty retreat to Venta Cruces, which they easily occupied for some time. They returned to Port Plenty on 22 February.

=== Veragua, 1573 ===
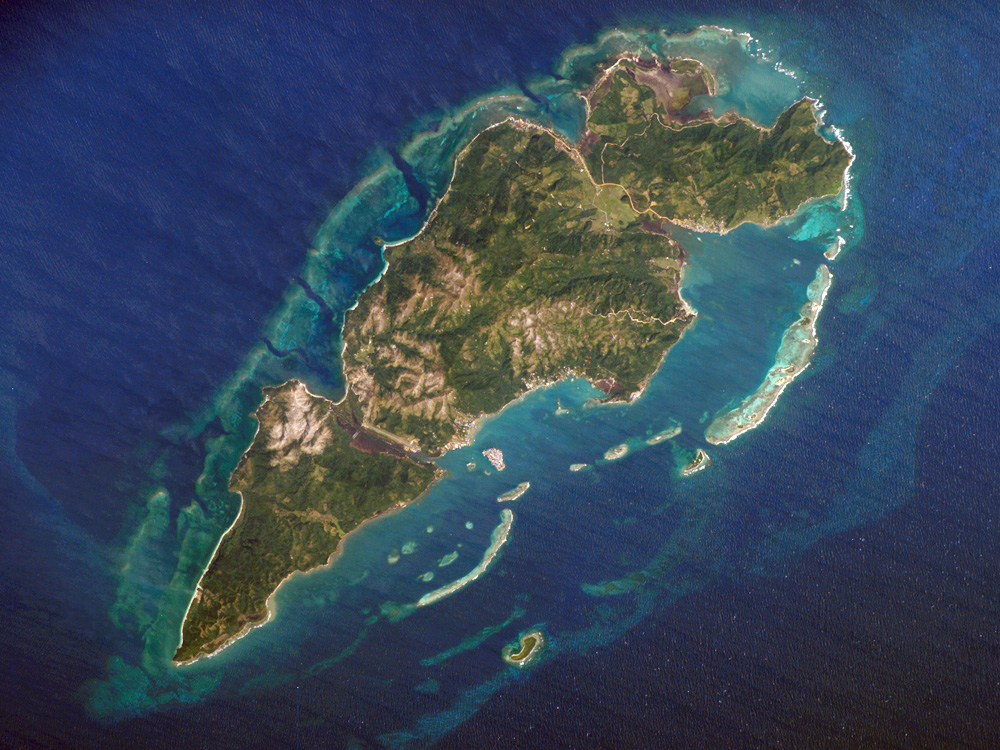
Englishmen unfamiliar with Honduran waters may have required local guidance to approach Bonacca (pictured)

Undaunted by the unexpected shortfall in treasure, Drake determined to supplement their booty by cruising off Veragua (Note: From Cape Gracias a Dios to Rio Belen.) (aboard the Minion) from late February, desisting only on 19 March, after having seized a Spanish frigate and pressed her Genoese pilot. In the meantime, Oxenham (in the Bear) set out on his own cruise from Port Plenty, during which he hijacked a well-provisioned Spanish frigate out of Tolu. He returned to camp by 21 March, at which point their third pinnace (the Lion) had to be scuttled "for lack of men".

Sometime that February, an unidentified group of 13 Englishmen (on a small frigate) seized four Spanish merchant frigates off the Desaguadero, at the mouth of the San Juan River. They were later heard of landing a frigate, pinnace and skiff at Bonacca, in the afternoon of Holy Thursday, to which island they were brought by a Portuguese (Antonio Vaez) and two Spanish men. By the time Truxillo's authorities despatched 40 soldiers (on a small ship) to capture the pirates, the latter had already departed, reportedly "steering a northerly course", though the English had apparently threatened to pillage Golfo Dulce (west of Bonacca). Wright reckons that this party may very well have been Drake's or Oxenham's.

Whatever the case, Drake and Oxenham were back in Port Plenty by 22 March, when they celebrated Easter in their home base. On Easter Monday, Drake ventured out, aboard his Spanish prize and the Bear. On 25 March, they chanced upon Guillaume Le Testu (and his 70 men aboard the Havre, an 80-ton ship), who agreed to consort with Drake and the Cimarrons for a renewed attempt at finally seizing all of the Spanish silver train.

=== Nombre de Dios, 1573 ===
On 31 March, Drake (with 20 Englishmen), Le Testu (with some 20 Frenchmen) and Mandingo (with a number of Cimarron men) rendezvoused at the mouth of the San Francisco River, from where they advanced towards Nombre de Dios, to intercept the Spanish treasure train heading north along the Camino Real. This time, the privateers' trap was not discovered, such that the unsuspecting train (of some 160 plate-laden mules and 45 armed guards) fell right into the ambush when they passed by the following morning of 1 April. The Spanish naturally engaged the raiders, killing some and wounding others (including Le Testu) in the process, but were eventually subdued and driven off, leaving nearly 30 tons of silver and gold for the taking. The triumphant pirates could not transport that much plate, though, and fearing Spanish reinforcements, made a hasty retreat with only half the treasure, having hid the other half and entrusted it to Le Testu (who remained behind with two of his men) for later retrieval. Drake and Mandingo led their crews (and all but three of the surviving Frenchmen) back to the San Francisco rendezvous, which they reached on 3 April, where they found seven Spanish pinnaces but none of their own vessels (one Spanish prize and the Minion and Bear had been blown some 12 miles off to the west). Drake and three "brave companions" were forced to venture out (in a shoddy raft) to retrieve the pinnaces, which they did by nightfall. Drake now took everyone to Port Plenty, where the carted booty (some 15 tons of plate) was divided and each contingent parted ways.

A relief party, however, as not sent to Le Testu (and the hidden treasure) until about the middle of April, when Oxenham and Thomas Sherwell made the trek back, with 10 Englishmen and 16 Cimarrons. They came upon a single Frenchman only, who informed them that Le Testu and the other crewman, along with most of the circa 15 tons of plate, had long since been taken by the Spanish, who had returned later on the day of the ambush (1 April) and discovered their hiding spot. After a survey of the area, which uncovered 13 silver bars and a few golden quoits rings left behind, Oxenham and Sherwell rescued the Frenchman and returned to Port Plenty. All in all, the Oxford Dictionary of National Biography reckons this raid alone netted the Englishmen at least £20,000.

=== Return ===
Drake finally departed Port Plenty in late April, now with a crew of 30 men. They were provisioned at the Magdalena (with 250 river turtles and a laden Spanish merchantman), and set anchor at Plymouth on 9 August 1573, thus bringing their Caribbean expedition to an end.

=== Timeline ===
The following is an abbreviated timeline of Drake's expedition as detailed above.

- 24 May 1572: Drake (with 73 men in the Pascha and Swan) departs from Plymouth.
- 29 June 1572: Drake (with 73 men in the Pascha and Swan) arrives in Dominica, and gets provisions.
- 1 July 1572: Drake (with 73 men in the Pascha and Swan) departs from Dominica.
- 12 July 1572: Drake (with 73 men in the Pascha and Swan) arrives in Port Pheasant, and assembles the Lion, Bear and Minion pinnaces.
- 13 July 1572: Raunce (with 30 men in a barque and Spanish shallop) arrives in Port Pheasant.
- 14 July 1572: Drake cruises near Port Pheasant, and seizes the Santa Catalina and detains her captain (Couto) and crew for 40 days.
- 20 July 1572–28 July 1572: Drake (with 53 men in the Lion, Bear and Minion) and Raunce (with 20 men in a Spanish shallop) cruise near Isle of Pinos, and seize two Spanish frigates.
- 29 July 1572–30 July 1572: Drake (with 53 men in the Lion, Bear and Minion) and Raunce (with 20 men in a Spanish shallop) sack Nombre de Dios, and seize merchandise, but are opposed by the Spanish (fatal casualties on both sides).
- 6 August 1572: Raunce (with 30 men in a barque and Spanish shallop) departs from Port Pheasant.
- 13 August 1572: Drake (in the Pascha, Swan, Lion, Bear and Minion) cruises off the Main, and seizes a Spanish ship (240 ton).
- 14 August 1572: Drake cruises off the Main, and seizes two Spanish frigates, but burns one of them, and scuttles the Swan.
- 15 August 1572: Drake (in the Pascha, Lion, Bear, Minion, a Spanish ship and Spanish frigate) arrives in Port Plenty.
- 16 August 1572–23 September 1572: Drake cruises near the Main.
- 15 August 1572–23 September 1572: Mandingo arrives in Port Plenty, and agrees to be an ally due to John Drake.
- 24 September 1572: Drake arrives in Port Plenty, and relocates their camp.
- 17 October 1572–19 October 1572: Drake cruises off the Main, and seizes a Spanish barque (50 ton), and maroons her souls (ten Spanish, five slaves).
- 20 October 1572–21 October 1572: Drake cruises off the Main, and seizes a Spanish ship (58 ton) and Spanish frigate (12 ton), and maroons their souls.
- 22 October 1572–2 November 1572: Drake (in some vessel) and Mendoza (in two frigates and a shallop) cruise off Carthagena, but the Spanish engage them.
- 3 November 1572: Drake departs from Carthagena.
- 5 November 1572: Drake arrives in the Magdalena, but finds no Spanish residents nor livestock, though he seizes a Spanish frigate (no cargo).
- 12 November 1572: Drake arrives in Santa Marta, and seizes a Spanish ship (90 ton, well-provisioned), and detains her crew, but is opposed by Spanish snipers.
- 13 November 1572: Drake arrives in Curacao.
- 15 November 1572–18 November 1572: Oxenham (in the Minion) departs from Curacao.
- 15 November 1572–26 November 1572: Drake cruises off the Main.
- 27 November 1572: Drake arrives in Port Plenty, and rests for some time, during which John and Joseph Drake die.
- 30 January 1573: The Lion cruises off Nombre de Dios, and seizes a Spanish frigate, whose crew are detained and interrogated.
- 3 February 1573: Drake (with 17 men) and Mandingo (with 30 men) depart from Port Plenty, and march south through the jungle.
- 14 February 1573: Drake (with 17 men) and Mandingo (with 30 men) arrive in Panama, where they set up an ambush for the Spanish treasure train which is soon foiled, though they do seize a couple laden mules (with fatal casualties), and torch one Spanish settlement.
- 22 February 1573: Drake (with 17 men) and Mandingo (with 30 men) arrive in Port Plenty.
- 23 February 1573–19 March 1573: Drake (with 17 men) cruises off Veragua, and seizes a Spanish frigate, and presses her Genoese pilot.
- 23 February 1573–21 March 1573: Oxenham (in the Bear) and Mandingo (with 30 men) cruise somewhere east of Veragua, and seize a Spanish frigate (well-provisioned).
- 23 March 1573–30 March 1573: Drake (in the Bear and a Spanish frigate) cruises somewhere.
- 25 March 1573: Drake (in the Bear and a Spanish frigate) and Testu (with 70 men in the Havre) meet somewhere, and decide to consort with each other.
- 31 March 1573–3 April 1573: Drake (with 20 men in the Bear, Minion and a Spanish frigate), Testu (with 20 men) and Mandingo sack the Spanish treasure train near Nombre de Dios (with fatal casualties), and seize three mule trains (30 tons of plate), though they perforce leave half of the treasure behind (with Testu and two guards).
- 7 April 1573–22 April 1573: Oxenham (with 11 men) and Mandingo (with 16 men) try to relieve Testu near Nombre de Dios, and do retrieve a bit of the treasure prior left behind, and relieve one of its guards, but they do not find Testu nor the other Frenchman (presumed dead).
- 15 April 1573–30 April 1573: Drake (with 30 men) departs from Port Plenty, and seizes a Spanish vessel.
- 9 August 1573: Drake (with 30 men) arrives in Plymouth.

== Aftermath ==
Drake and company are thought to have profited at least £20,000 altogether (worth some £4.76 million today, but still only one-fifth of Drake's 1571 loot). Some of this may have been forwarded to members of Elizabeth I's Privy Council, who allegedly secured Drake a pre-emptive pardon for his unauthorised expedition. Drake himself may have used some of his share to buy a property on Notte Street, Plymouth, where he was listed as a merchant in 1576.

In the first half of 1573, the Real Audiencia of Panama stationed 60 soldiers at the Nombre de Dios garrison, to bolster that port's defence, and further petitioned the Spanish crown "promptly to take measures necessary to the defence of this coast and kingdom, for it is considered certain that the corsairs who have now left will return in greater force, and it is even said that they announce that they will settle". Later that year, Spanish authorities in Panama retaliated against Drake's Cimarron allies.

The neighbouring Real Audiencia of Guatemala likewise took steps to better defend their ports, planning "to settle some Indians in a location [in Golfo Dulce] such that they can send warning if any [pirate] vessels seek to enter".

== Legacy ==
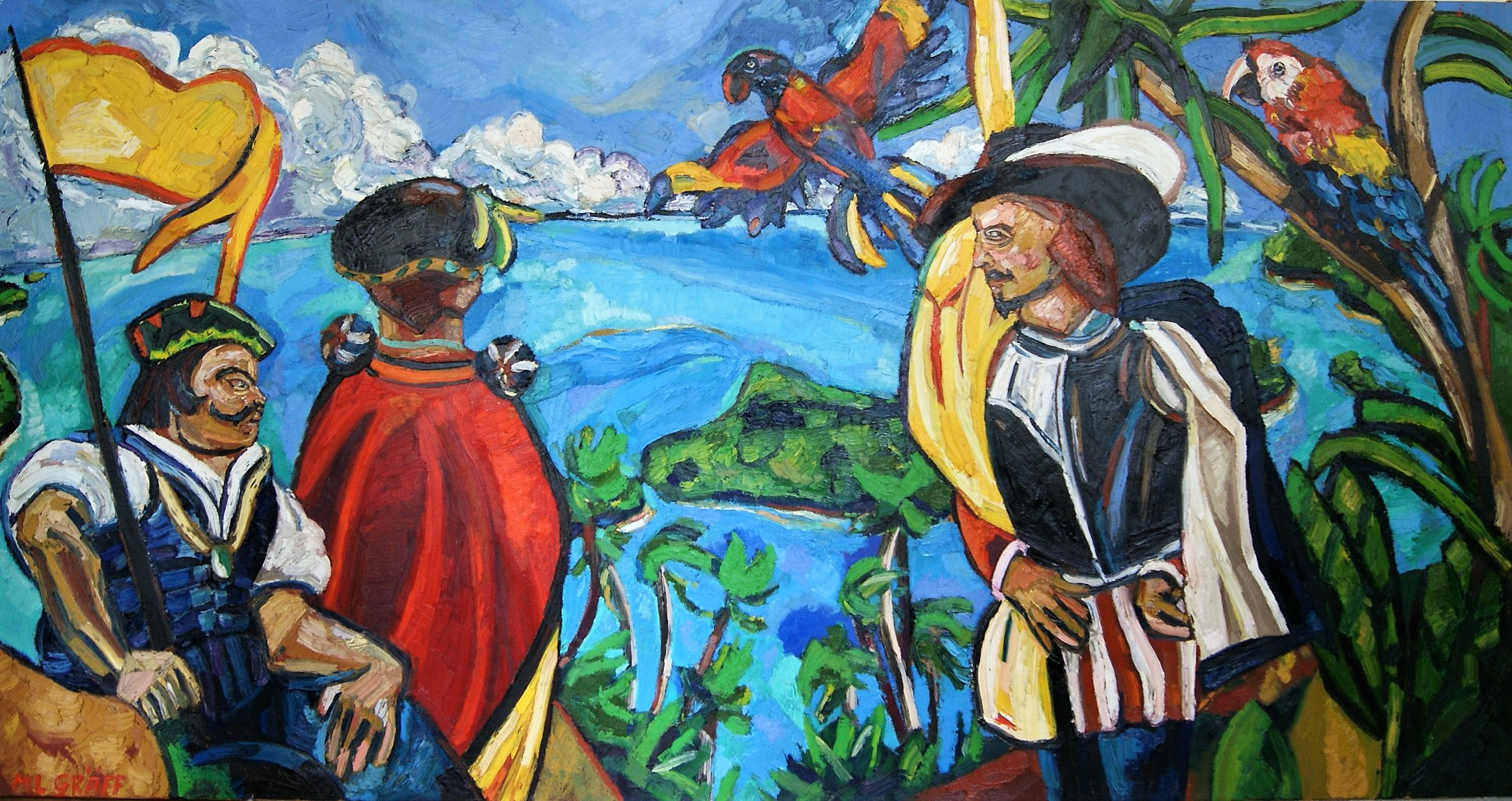
Drake in 1573 is said to have first seen the Pacific from the same lookout point as Balboa in 1513 (illustrated)

Wright considers this voyage Drake's first independent expedition, and is of the opinion that his second ambush of the Spanish treasure train may not unfairly be deemed "the most daring attack ever made upon Spanish-American treasure" up to the 1570s. Drake is further reputed as the first Englishman to have reached an elevated lookout point with unobstructed views of the South and North seas both, reportedly from the same lookout used during the Spanish discovery of the former sea in 1513. And either Drake or Oxenham are credited as the first English pirates to have cruised the Bay of Honduras, possibly including its western shores.

In the late 2010s, a Panamanian artisanal rum distillery was named after Mandingo (as Mandinga).

== See also ==
- Francis Drake's expedition of 1596 – to the same area
- Henry Morgan's expedition of 1670–1671 – to the same area
- Piracy in the Caribbean

== Notes and references ==
=== References ===
1. Andrews, Kenneth R, ed. (1958). English privateering voyages to the West Indies, 1588–1595 : documents relating to English voyages to the West Indies from the defeat of the armada to the last voyage of Sir Francis Drake. Works issued by the Hakluyt Society; 2nd ser., no. 111 (1st ed.). Cambridge: Published for the Hakluyt Society at the University Press. hdl:2027/mdp.39015026881832. OCLC 504851.
2. Andrews, Kenneth R. (1968) [First published 1967 by Weidenfeld & Nicolson]. Drake's voyages: a re-assessment of their place in Elizabethan maritime expansion. Works issued by the Hakluyt Society,2d ser., no. 111. New York: Charles Scribner's Sons. hdl:2027/mdp.39015026881832. OCLC 250607.
3. Arjona, Esther M. (20 March 2022). "Los sabores de Pedro Mandinga". Estrella de Panamá. Panama City.
4. Bergreen, Laurence (2021). In search of a kingdom : Francis Drake, Elizabeth I, and the perilous birth of the British Empire (1st ed.). New York: Custom House. OCLC 1193560224.
5. Best, Brian (2021). Elizabeth's sea dogs and their war against Spain (1st ed.). Barnsley: Frontline Books. OCLC 1241107573.
6. Bicheno, Hugh (2012). Elizabeth's Sea Dogs: How England's Mariners Became the Scourge of the Seas. Conway. ISBN 978-1844861743.
7. Bradley, Peter T. (1999). British maritime enterprise in the New World : from the late fifteenth to the mid-eighteenth century. Studies in British history; v. 57 (1st ed.). Lewiston, NY: Edwin Mellen Press. hdl:2027/mdp.39015054149409. ISBN 9780773478664. OCLC 42290563.
8. De la O Torres, Rodrigo Alejandro (November 2014). DE CORSARIOS, MARES Y COSTAS: EL CORSO EN LA CONSTRUCCIÓN DEL ESPACIO GOLFO-CARIBE. 1527-1620 (PhD). Mérida, Yuc.: Centro de Investigaciones y Estudios Superiores en Antropología Social.
9. De la O Torres, Rodrigo Alejandro (January–June 2016). "La presencia de corsarios franceses en el Golfo-Caribe entre 1536–1566 : una propuesta de análisis espacial". Historia 2.0: Conocimiento Histórico en Clave Digital. 6 (11): 36–56. ISSN 2027-9035.
10. De la O Torres, Rodrigo Alejandro (July–December 2019). "Miedos y fenómeno de la piratería en el Golfo-Caribe durante el siglo XVI. Un ensayo de aproximación". Historelo revista de historia regional y local. 11 (2): 267–300. doi:10.15446/historelo.v11n22.73263. ISSN 2145-132X. S2CID 198778698.
11. De la O Torres, Rodrigo Alejandro (2020). DE CORSARIOS, MARES Y COSTAS : El corso en la construcción del espacio y experiencias marítimas en el Golfo-Caribe, 1527–1620 (1st ed.). Ciudad Universitaria, Aguascalientes: Universidad Autónoma de Aguascalientes. OCLC 1280054563.
12. Gasteazoro, Carlos Manuel; Araúz, Calestino Andrés; Muñoz Pinzón, Armando (1980). Tabla cronológica : (de hechos históricos, políticos, sociales, económicos, culturales y científicos) (1st ed.). Panamá: Lotería Nacional de Beneficencia. OCLC 12830207.
13. Figueroa, Alejandro J.; Johnson, Erlend; Goodwin, Whitney A., eds. (2021). Southeastern Mesoamerica : indigenous interaction, resilience, and change (1st ed.). Louisville, Colorado: University Press of Colorado. OCLC 1226797442.
14. Galvin, Peter Robert (1991). The Pirates' Wake: A Geography of Piracy and Pirates as Geographers in Colonial Spanish America, 1536–1718. (Volumes I and II) (PhD). Baton Rouge, Louis.: Louisiana State University.
15. Hakluyt, Richard, ed. (1600). The principal nauigations, voiages, traffiques and discoueries of the English nation made by sea or ouer-land, to the remote and farthest distant quarters of the earth, at any time within the compasse of these 1500. yeeres: deuided into three seuerall volumes, according to the positions of the regions, whereunto they were directed. Vol. 3 (2nd expanded ed.). London: George Bishop, Ralfe Newberie, & Robert Barker. OCLC 252871354. ProQuest 2248550788.
16. Howgego, Raymond John (1958). To 1800: a comprehensive reference guide to the history and literature of exploration, travel, and colonization from the earliest times to the year 1800. Encyclopedia of exploration to 1800 : a comprehensive reference guide to the history and literature of exploration, travel, and colonization from the earliest times to the year 1800 (1st ed.). Potts Point, N.S.W.: Hordern House. hdl:2027/mdp.49015002827245. ISBN 9781875567362. OCLC 52377840.
17. Kelsey, Harry (23 September 2004). "Drake, Sir Francis". Oxford Dictionary of National Biography (online ed.). Oxford University Press. doi:10.1093/ref:odnb/8022. (Subscription, Wikipedia Library access or UK public library membership required.)
18. Marley, David F. (1998). Wars of the Americas : a chronology of armed conflict in the New World, 1492 to the present (1st ed.). Santa Barbara, CA: ABC-CLIO. hdl:2027/mdp.49015002845379. ISBN 9780874368376. OCLC 39024726.
19. Marley, David F. (2010). 1650-1685. Pirates of the Americas. Vol. 1 (1st ed.). Santa Barbara, CA: ABC-CLIO. OCLC 436030697.
20. Marley, David F. (2010). 1686–1725. Pirates of the Americas. Vol. 2 (1st ed.). Santa Barbara, CA: ABC-CLIO. OCLC 436030697.
21. McDermott, James (23 September 2004). "Oxenham, John". Oxford Dictionary of National Biography (online ed.). Oxford University Press. doi:10.1093/ref:odnb/21057. (Subscription, Wikipedia Library access or UK public library membership required.)
22. Williamson, James A. (1927). Sir John Hawkins : the time and the man (1st ed.). Oxford: Clarendon Press. hdl:2027/mdp.39015027905218. OCLC 3075296.
23. Williamson, James A. (1938). The age of Drake. Pioneer histories, edited by V. T. Harlow ... And J. A. Williamson (1st ed.). London: Adam and Charles Black. hdl:2027/mdp.39015014588183. OCLC 1421005.
24. Winzerling, E. O. (1946). Beginning of British Honduras, 1506–1765 (1st ed.). New York: North River Press. OCLC 1892890.
25. Wright, Irene A., ed. (1929). Spanish documents concerning English voyages to the Caribbean, 1527–1568. Works issued by the Hakluyt Society; 2nd ser., no. 62 (1st ed.). London: Printed for the Hakluyt Society. OCLC 2092435.
26. Wright, Irene A., ed. (1932). Documents concerning English voyages to the Spanish main, 1569–1580. Works issued by the Hakluyt Society; 2nd ser., no. 71 (1st ed.). London: Printed for the Hakluyt Society. hdl:2027/mdp.39015012306133. OCLC 1476408.
27. Wright, Irene A., ed. (1951). Further English voyages to Spanish America, 1583–1594 : documents from the Archives of the Indies at Seville illustrating English voyages to the Caribbean, the Spanish Main, Florida, and Virginia. Works issued by the Hakluyt Society; 2nd ser., no. 99 (1st ed.). London: Printed for the Hakluyt Society. hdl:2027/mdp.39015026881790. OCLC 1476734.
