= Bayano Dam =

Dam in Darién, Panama

- Location: Darién Province, Panama
- Coordinates: 9°10′29″N 78°53′4″W
- Opening date: 1976

Dam and spillways
- Impounds: Bayano River

Reservoir
- Creates: Lago Bayano

The Bayano Dam is a dam on the Bayano River in Darién Province, Panama. The dam was built in 1976; its construction flooded approximately 350 square kilometers of rainforest, displacing thousands of indigenous residents. The flooded area is now Bayano Lake. The dam is the second-largest power source in Panama.

== See also ==
- Fortuna Dam, the dam in Panama that generates the most power.
