= Chiriquí Viejo River =

River in Panama

Coordinates: 8.3275°N 82.7019°W

- Location of mouth

Location
- Country: Panama

The Chiriquí Viejo River is a river of Panama.

It should not be confused with the Chiriquí Nuevo to the east.

There are several dams and hydroelectric projects on this river, including the Bajo de Mina and Baitún.

== See also ==
- List of rivers of Panama
