= Arch–gravity dam =

Type of dam

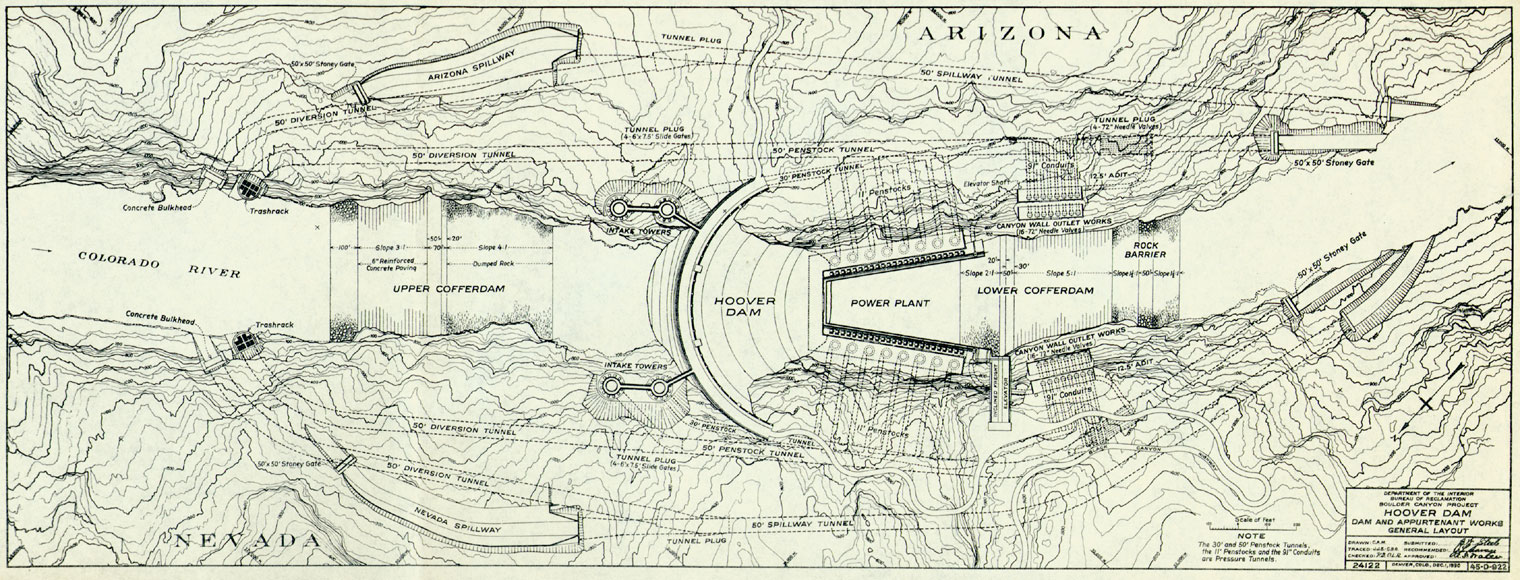
Arch–gravity Hoover Dam architectural plans

An arch–gravity dam is a dam with the characteristics of both an arch dam and a gravity dam. It is a dam that curves upstream in a narrowing curve that directs most of the force from the water against the canyon rock walls, which provide the force to compress the dam. It combines the strengths of two common dam forms and is a compromise between the two. They are made of conventional concrete, roller-compacted concrete (RCC), or masonry. A typical example of the conventional concrete dam is the Hoover Dam. Changuinola Dam is an example of the RCC arch–gravity dam. A gravity dam requires a large volume of internal fill. An arch–gravity dam can be thinner than a pure gravity dam and requires less internal fill.

== Overview ==
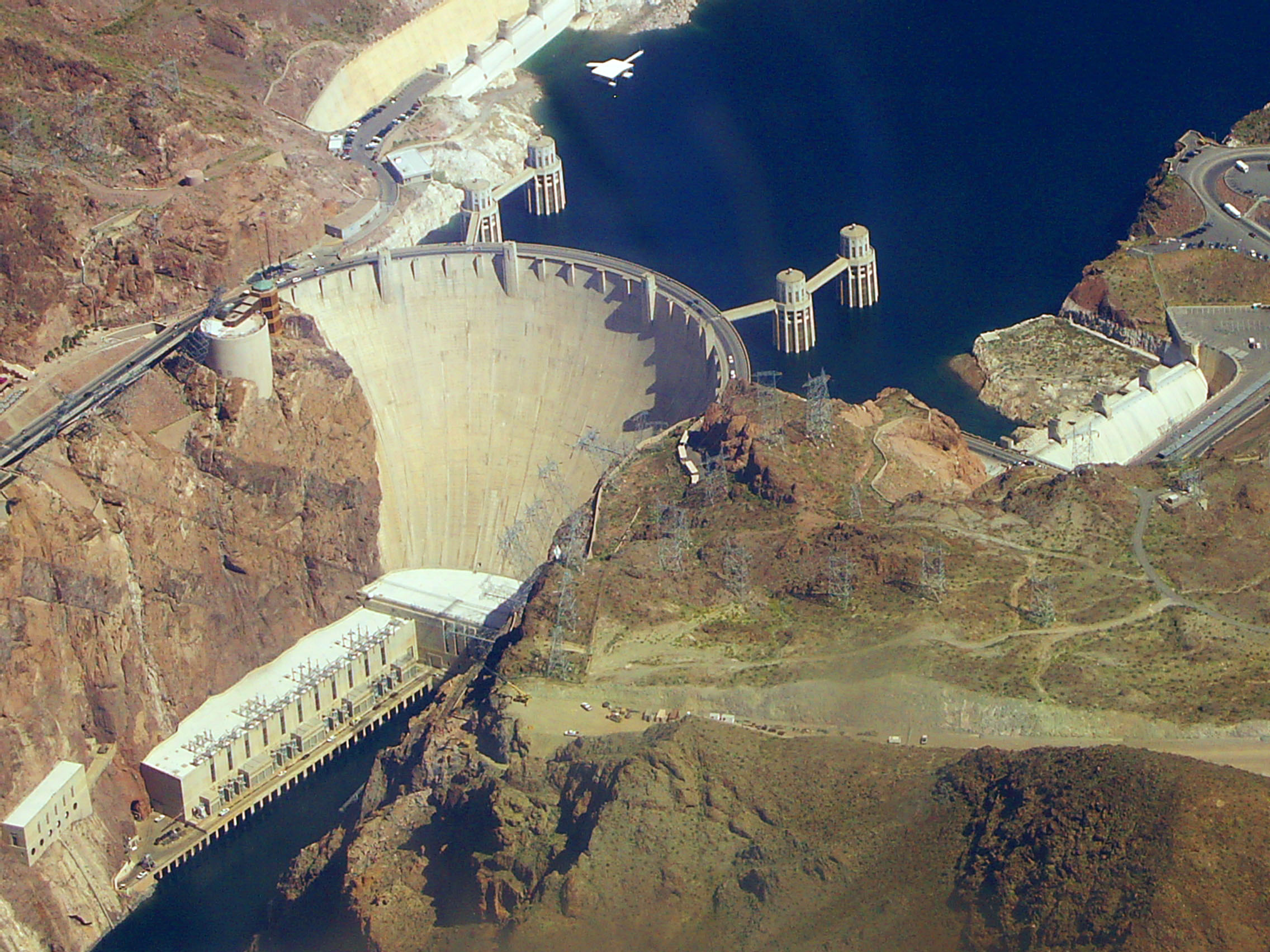
Aerial view of Hoover Dam

Arch–gravity dams are dams that resist the thrust of water by their weight using the force of gravity and the arch action.

An arch–gravity dam incorporates the arch's curved design which is effective in supporting the water in narrow, rocky locations where the gorge's sides are of hard rock and the water is forced into a narrow channel. Therefore, the span needed for the dam is also relatively narrow, and the dam's curved design effectively holds the water back while using less construction material than a pure arch dam or pure gravity dam. These dams are more reliable than arch dams. Typically, arch–gravity dams are built in canyon-like terrain, with the surrounding cliffs serving as supporting walls. An arch-shaped bank-fill design reduces the overall mass of the structure and the cost of construction compared to pure gravity dams. Arch dams and arch–gravity dams are most commonly used in hydraulic structures of more than 100 m in height.

== See also ==
- Masonry dam
- Embankment dam
