= Changuinola Dam =

Dam in Bocas del Toro, Panama

- Location within Panama
- Official name: Changuinola I Dam
- Location: Panama
- Coordinates: 9°14′11.63″N 82°29′41.13″W
- Construction began: 2007; 19 years ago
- Opening date: 2014; 12 years ago

Dam and spillways
- Type of dam: Arch-gravity, roller compacted concrete
- Height: 99.2 m (325 ft)
- Length: 600 m (2,000 ft)
- Dam volume: 890,000 m^{3} (31,000,000 cu ft)

Reservoir
- Normal elevation: 165 m (541 ft)

Power Station
- Turbines: 2 x 106.4 MW (142,700 hp) Francis-type, 1 x 9.66 MW (12,950 hp)
- Installed capacity: 223 MW (299,000 hp)
- Annual generation: 1,046 GWh (3,770 TJ)

Changuinola I Dam, is located in district of Changuinola, in the Province of Bocas del Toro, in the western part of Panama. It is the largest roller-compacted concrete arch-gravity dam in the World.

== Technical features ==
The design of the dam was conducted by Malcolm Dunstan & Associates engineering and construction company.

The construction of the dam started on October 25, 2007 and its first generator was operational on November 19, 2011. The roller-compacted concrete arch-gravity dam has a maximum height of 99.2 metres (325 ft) and length of 600 metres (2,000 ft). The upstream vertical face arch radius is 525 metres (1,722 ft). The induced joints are spaced at 20 metres (66 ft) intervals, with inducers installed in every second layer after compaction. The downstream face slope varies form 0.5:1 (H:V) in the center and 0.7:1 (H:V) on the flanks.

The RCC mix strength requirements were determined by a target direct tensile strength of 1.2 megapascals (170 psi). The composition of the high-paste RCC mix included:

- Portland Cement - 70 kg/m^{3}
- Fly Ash - 145 kg/m^{3}
- Water - 119 kg/m^{3}
- Coarse Aggregate - 1282 kg/m^{3}
- Fine Aggregate - 888 kg/m^{3}
- Retarder - 3.44 kg/m^{3}

== See also ==
- List of power stations in Panama
