= Bayano Caves =

Caves in Panama

Coordinates: 9°15′0″N 78°52′59″W

The Bayano Caves are three caves located on the south side of Lago Bayano in Panamá Province, Panama.

The presence of the caves was first acknowledged when a map of the El Territotio de Maje Embera Dvua Alto Bayano was drawn in 1960.

The first, largest cave is approximately two kilometers long. The Río Seco runs through the cave, allowing boats to go partway inside the cavern. Though the cave receives some visitors, it is not lit. Many bats live in the cave.

The second and third caves are less accessible, requiring crawling to explore.

Wearing a hard hat, a life jacket, and using a stick to walk on the rocky floor are all obligatory to visit the caves.

In November 2021, heavy rains in the region flash-flooded the Río Seco, trapping 16 tourists inside the caves they were visiting. 3 persons were found dead.

The area around Lago Bayano is full of untouched, undocumented caves.
