= Cimarron people (Panama) =

Community of escaped formerly enslaved Africans in Panama

The Cimarrons in Panama were enslaved Africans who had escaped from their Spanish enslavers and lived together as maroons. In the 1570s, they allied with Francis Drake of England to defeat the Spanish conquest. In Sir Francis Drake Revived (1572), Drake describes the Cimarrons as "a black people which about eighty years past fled from the Spaniards their masters, by reason of their cruelty, and are since grown to a nation, under two kings of their own. The one inhabiteth to the west, the other to the east of the way from Nombre de Dios".

== Etymology ==
The English term Maroons is derived from the Spanish word cimarrón, meaning "wild" or "untamed". This word initially referred to cattle and animals that had gone astray, particularly in the early Caribbean. By the 1520s, it had begun to be applied to people including Indigenous people and Africans who fled Spanish servitude. Scholars believe that the Spanish term cimarron comes from the Taino word si'maran meaning “wild, savage, gone astray”.

== History ==
Slave rebellions and uprisings in the New World were very common during the first years of exploration. Runaway slaves were prevalent in Brazil as well, where they were known as palenques, cumbes and quilombos. These runaway slaves fled from the mines and Spanish towns and built their own nearly independent towns. Such towns hosted a blend of cultures and a diversity of traditions from African, Euroamerican and Indigenous roots. In 1529, in what is now Colombia, rebel enslaved people destroyed Santa Marta.

The Cimarrons in Panama were African slaves who abandoned their Spanish masters in the mid-16th century. When brought to Panama, they intermarried with the natives and immediately learned the land in order to outsmart the Spanish. An estimated 3,000 of them lived in Nombre de Dios, a town on the Caribbean side. Their principal settlement was at Vallano (or Bayano), 30 leagues below Nombre de Dios. In the 1570s the Spanish authorities estimated this district had 1700 fighting men. Bayano, a Mandinka man who had been enslaved and taken to Panama in 1552, led a rebellion that year against the Spanish in Panama, known as the Bayano Wars. He and his followers escaped to found villages in the lowlands. Viceroy Canete felt unable to subdue these maroons, so he offered them terms that entailed a recognition of their freedom, provided they refused to admit any newcomers and returned runaways to their owners.

Many lived in large settlements or in hideouts concealed in the inhospitable mountains. They frequently organized raids on the Spanish settlements and had threatened to burn down Nombre de Dios. They often stole treasure from the Spanish and concealed it in the river. When the Spanish once prepared to send an expedition against them, they constructed gallows on the main road and threatened to hang and decapitate the Spanish if such a mission was undertaken.

The Spanish feared that the Cimarrons would join forces with the Indians and stage a mass rebellion. To prevent this, they issued strict laws of punishment, called Ordenazas para los negros. If a slave ran away from his Spanish master and joined the Cimarrons, he was to be hanged (if recaptured). The Indians, who were treated much better than slaves, were also punished with severity if they joined the Cimarrons.

The Cimarrones valued iron to the extent that the Spanish and English valued gold. They used iron to build the heads of their arrows which they used for hunting and for protection against the Spanish. They were also skillful in that they could very quickly prepare shelters made out of palm trees which were waterproof and could be warmed with ventilated fires. The Cimarrones were not only hunter-gatherers but rather had extensive and well-defended settlements, sometimes numbering over sixty households.

== Context of 16th-century Europe ==
In the 1550s, Spain was involved in a mission of spreading the Catholic gospel to Latin America and other "uncivilized" regions of the New World. This posed a threat to the Protestant world, namely England, who then became involved in freeing these countries from Spanish domination. John Hawkins of Plymouth, England became one of Queen Elizabeth's first "sea dogs" and became involved in the African slave trade in Spanish America. He bought, stole and captured slaves from the coast of Guinea and carried them to the Spanish Main where he sold them. In one voyage in which he was accompanied by Sir Francis Drake, the Spanish attacked his ships but he and Drake managed to escape.

== Alliance with Sir Francis Drake ==
In 1572, Drake traveled to Nombre de Dios, Panama in search of the Spanish treasure being carried from Peru across the Isthmus of Panama. While waiting for the treasure to arrive, he made contact with the Cimarrons (whose population was around 3,000), whom he described as “certaine valiant Negros fled from their cruel masters the Spaniards”. The first Cimarron he encountered was named Pedro Mandiga (or Mandinga), who helped guide Drake and his men across the Chagres River to Spanish outposts. Because the Cimarrons knew the land well and despised the Spanish, they were eager to assist Drake in his pursuit of Spanish gold.

In February 1573, the Cimarrons informed Drake that the Spanish mule trains carrying the gold (also known as the flota) were sighted in Nombre de Dios and were moving across the Isthmus. Drake, guided by 30 Cimarrones through a series of hidden pathways and accompanied by John Oxenham, embarked on a journey to intercept the gold. They rose at dawn and marched until four in the afternoon. Without the help of the Cimarrons, who were clearly in charge of the path finding, Drake and his men would have never made it across the Isthmus. At one point during the journey, the Cimarrons took the English to their favorite point on a steep hill where it was possible to see both the Atlantic and Pacific oceans at the same time.

During the journey, the Cimarrons carried most of the supplies, such as bows and arrows for defense against the Spanish. Once they arrived at the spot where they planned to carry out their ambush in Nombre de Dios, a Cimarron spy was sent to the Spanish post to find out when the treasure procession would begin. He came back and reported that Treasurer of Lima was to appear on the road within the next few hours. At one point, two Cimarrons were sent to kidnap a sleeping Spanish guard and question him about the Spanish treasure. He confirmed what the English already knew and begged not to be killed. When the mule train arrived with the treasure, the Spanish saw a Cimarron hiding and quickly turned the procession around. Drake and his men still managed to ambush the train but found that it did not carry anything of much value. The Cimarrones vowed to Drake and the English that they would continue being their friends and allies.

In April, Drake and his Cimarron allies joined up with a Huguenot party under the cartographer Guillaume Le Testu (Tetu), who brought news of the Massacre of St Bartholomew and proffered alliance: Drake was wary, but had little choice save acceptance, since the French had more than double his resources. A new ambush was set near Nombre de Dios, this time successfully, though Le Testu was killed. Little of the massive haul of silver could be carried off, but gold to the value of 80–100,000 pesos was taken away.

The Cimarrons cared little about getting a part of the stolen gold or silver, but rather desired iron, which Drake handed over to them in plentiful amounts.

In February 1577, the Cimarrons guided John Oxenham in raiding Spanish shipping from Peru and Spanish settlements on the Pearl Islands. During this raid, the raiders collected all the gold, silver and jewels they could, liberated seventy slaves, who were turned over to the Cimarrons, and desecrated the churches.

== Spanish response ==
Drake became the ambassador of the Cimarrones, Spain's leading New World enemies. The Spanish feared the Cimarron alliance with the English, believing it might lead to larger scale expeditions and possibly even settlement. They also believed that it might help the English reach the Pacific and steal their treasure. In 1577, the English took advantage of the alliance to launch multiple successful raids in the Pacific. The English also angered the Spanish by instilling in the Cimarrons a hatred for Catholicism and a love for "Lutheranism" (the Spanish at the time used "Lutherans" as a general word for all Protestants, including Anglicans). Citizens of Panama wrote anxious letters to Madrid complaining about how the cimarrons were inflicting heavy damage in robbery, plunder and death. One such letter stated, "this league between the English and the Negroes is very detrimental to this kingdom, because, being so thoroughly acquainted with the region and so expert in the bush, the Negroes will show them methods and means to accomplish any evil design they may wish to carry out".

In 1577, the Spanish sent a well armed body of volunteers from Panama to invade the Cimarron settlements and burn all of their crops and villages. By 1579, when this had been accomplished, the Cimarrons agreed to settle in a large pueblo where they enjoyed some measure of self-determination under Spanish rule. This ended any plans of the English to maintain an alliance with the enslaved Africans.

The alliance between the English and the Cimarrons did not last long and the groups soon found themselves in conflict with one another.

== Alliance significance ==
=== English reputation ===
This alliance shed light on how the English viewed themselves and their role in the New World. While Indians in other areas of the New World (such as Hispaniola) were being treated poorly by European masters, and other nations were actively engaged in the slave trade, the English prided themselves on the thought that they were “liberators” who allied with these black slaves against the Spanish. Such an alliance seemed to say that the English were free of racial prejudices, even though they were actively involved in the slave trade themselves.

=== Formation of the American colonies ===
The news of Sir Francis Drake's adventures and alliances with the Cimarrons was reaching England and the Western world. It was clear that what Drake and the English had in mind was to establish the nation as a colonial power south of the Tropic of Capricorn and to bring under English influence southern Brazil, the Río de la Plata, the Strait of Magellan, Patagonia and Chile. Drake's travels inspired another "sea dog", Richard Hakluyt, to propose the establishment of English naval bases in Magellan's Strait and in southern Brazil to be manned by pirates, convicts and Cimarrones.

Hakluyt's intention in constructing an overseas colony was that it would be free from tyranny and slavery with the Cimarrons as the primary colonists. He believed that the Cimarrons were "a people detesting the proud governance of the Spaniards" and so would gladly move to these new colonies by the hundreds or thousands. His thinking followed that this ideal colony would be easy to sustain without the presence of Spanish tyranny and with the willingness of the Cimarrons to live a happy and satisfied existence in the colonies. The Cimarrons would also be useful in allowing the English to access all the gold mines of Peru.

Hakluyt also wanted to include in this colony "condemned English men and women, in whom there may be founde hope of amendment". However, nowhere did Hakluyt mention whether or not the Cimarrones would be involved in self-government like the other colonists, but neither did he say they would be held in bondage. England did not accept Hakluyt's proposal for a colony, but within five years in 1585, Sir Walter Raleigh had established the Roanoke Colony.

Drake's alliance with the Cimarrons inspired the English to expand their forces and colonize in other areas of the globe. To the English, the Cimarrons acted as a model citizenry whom they hoped their own colonists would take after. Although a colony manned by Cimarrons never actually came into existence, the ideology of creating a colony free of racial prejudices was one in which the English intended their own colonies to constitute.

== See also ==
- Maroons
