= Bonyic Dam =

Dam in Changuinola, Bocas del Toro, Panama

- Location within Panama
- Country: Panama
- Location: Changuinola
- Coordinates: 9°19′28.74″N 82°38′28.7″W
- Purpose: Power
- Status: Operational
- Opening date: January, 2014

Dam and spillways
- Type of dam: Gravity, roller-compacted concrete
- Impounds: Bonyic River
- Height: 37 m (121 ft)
- Length: 165 m (541 ft)
- Elevation at crest: 244 m (801 ft)

Power Station
- Turbines: 3 x 10.88 MW Francis-type
- Installed capacity: 32.64 MW

The Bonyic Dam is a gravity dam on the Bonyic River, a tributary of the Teribe River about 24 km (15 mi) southwest of Changuinola in the Bocas del Toro province of northwestern Panama. The project produce hydroelectricity at a 32.64 MW power station about 3.8 km (2 mi) downstream of the dam. The builder and operator is Hidroécología Teribe (HET) S.A., a private Panamanian company whose majority stockholder is Empresas Públicas de Medellín (EPM), a public utility company owned by the municipal government of Medellín, Colombia. The dam construction was subject to controversies that have resulted in the removal of its funding by the Inter-American Development Bank. The Bonyic dam would obstruct access for migrating fish to La Amistad International Park. Members of the local indigenous people, the Naso, have periodically blockaded the single road to delay construction for a cumulative total of four years.

== See also ==
- List of power stations in Panama
