= Bayano =

Kongo royal and Panamanian slave rebel

- Born: 16th century
- Died: 16th century Seville, Spain
- Other name: King Bayano
- Occupation: Maroon leader
- Known for: Bayano Wars

Bayano, also known as Ballano or Vaino, originally from either the Mandinka or the Yoruba community in West Africa, who was eventually captured by the Portuguese. He was said to be a strong leader who was heavily influenced by the Spanish. He is believed to have been in a position of power in Yoruba, as he developed traits of a king who would instill fear and obedience. Bayano, argued to mean “idol,” would ultimately go on to lead the biggest rebellions of enslaved people in 16th century Panama. He was even given the name “El Rey Negro Bayano,” by the Spanish, which translates to “The Black King Bayano.”

Different tales tell of the revolt in 1552 beginning either on the ship en route, or after landing in Panama's Darien province along its modern-day border with Colombia. The former slaves who managed to escape, known as cimarrones, or maroons, set up autonomous regions known as palenques, many of which successfully fended off Spanish control for centuries using guerrilla warfare, also navigating alliances with pirates. Bayano and his soldiers lived at the top of this hill in the palenque which was heavily guarded. The women, children, and elderly were located in a different area in the jungle. This area was heavily secluded due to the dense jungle, and would only be found years later after Bayano’s defeat. Indigenous and cimarron women were able to learn different languages to use to their community’s advantage and protection. They served as translators for Bayano and the different pirates who they formed alliances with. While serving as translators, these women also served as spies, gathering information for Bayano, as well as themselves.

Bayano's forces numbered between four to twelve hundred Cimarrons, depending upon different sources, and set up a palenque known as Ronconcholon near modern-day Chepo River, also known as Rio Bayano. They fought their guerrilla war for over five years while building their community. However, the most important primary source, written in 1581 by Pedro de Aguado, devotes space to their religious life, and describes the activities of a "bishop" who guided the community in prayer, baptized them, and delivered sermons, in a . manner that Aguado believed to be essentially Christian. The Spaniards, with Captain Carreño at their head, managed to destroy Rolcolcholon and after a surprise attack managed to capture Bayano himself, who was taken by Captain Carreño to Governor Sosa who was then in Nombre de Dios. Governor Sosa granted Bayano his freedom back after the condition that he would suspend all attacks. Agreeing to this, Bayano was released, yet did not keep his word and continued to attack. After each victory, the cimarrones had a victorious feast in the palanques, where the women and children took on the role of preparing everything. These feats would then turn into celebrations, as women and men danced traditional African dances, the men dancing to sacred warrior dances.

In 1556, the newly appointed Viceroy of Peru, the Marquis of Cañete, commissioned Pedro de Ursua to attack and defeat Bayano. With few Spaniards willing to go on the expedition, the viceroy authorized the conscription of criminals to bolster the Spanish forces. Initial engagements favored the Cimarrons who engaged in hit-and-run tactics to harass the Spanish. After reaching Bayano's main settlement, Ursua entreated under flag of truce. Ursua offered to free Bayano and his people and relocate them nearer to Nombre de Dios. After both sides agreed, Ursua proposed a feast to celebrate the occasion. Having brought a special poison, Ursua secretly drugged Bayano and his captains. When the leaders were stupefied by the drug the Spaniards attacked killing and capturing many maroons. Bayano was captured alive. Many maroons evaded the Spanish remaining at large.

== Bayano and the Cimarrones' legacy ==
There are debates about Bayano’s remaining days after being captured. It is known that Ursua took Bayano to Peru, where he is believed to have spent the remainder of his life. He is believed to have lived as hostage for years, dying surrounded by riches. As for the Cimarrones who were found after Bayano’s defeat, they were taken into captivity and later on forced into slavery. The difference of how Bayano was treated versus his fugitive peoples, after being captured shows how the Spaniards valued power, but did not value Bayano’s people because they were black. Bayano was treated as a king, yet his people he reigned over were given no protection.

Bayano's name has become immortal in the Panamanian consciousness through the naming of a major river, a lake, a valley, a dam, and several companies after him. His legacy and those of the Cimarrones go down in history as former fugitives who were able to regain agency in a powerful way, as they started off as fugitives but built something way bigger. A new society was built, one where they were no longer forced to obey enslavers, but were able to govern themselves as a people.

== See also ==
- Bayano Wars
