= Bayano Wars =

- Part of North American slave revolts
Date	1548–1558 and 1579–1582
Location	Isthmus of Panama
Result	Spanish victory

Belligerents
Spanish Empire	Cimarron people of Panama

Commanders and leaders
Unknown	Bayano †

Strength
Unknown	1552: 1,200

Casualties and losses
Unknown	Unknown

The Bayano Wars were armed conflicts in the Isthmus of Panama that occurred between the Cimarron people of Panama and the Spanish crown. The First War of the Bayano took place from 1548 to 1558, while the Second War took place from 1579 and 1582. Slavery, practiced since the early sixteenth century in Panama, brought many enslaved people from Africa to Spanish America. This brought successive slave uprisings against the rulers of the time, which was the origin for the Bayano Wars.

== Background ==
Upon the prompt introduction of African slaves by the Spanish into the New World, a swift emergence of open revolts ensued among these captives. Illustrative of this resistance were the Cimarrones, exemplifying a trend that proliferated across the Caribbean and Central America during the 16th Century. Enslaved Africans transported to Spanish colonies sought refuge in the wilderness, forming cohesive communities that occasionally abstained from interaction with their erstwhile captors. However, more frequently, these fugitives armed themselves and engaged in guerrilla campaigns against their former masters.

== Revolt ==
In Panama, entire populations of slaves sought liberation from captivity by establishing autonomous colonies in the jungles. Notably, their struggles against the Spanish garnered support from local indigenous tribes and even found alignment with Spain's European adversaries, such as the English privateer Francis Drake. King Bayano emerged as a prominent figure among the Cimarrones. In 1552, leading a force of up to 1,200 fugitives, Bayano established a palenque, or slave sanctuary, instigating a protracted war against the Spaniards spanning five years.

== Aftermath ==
Historical accounts attest to the democratic nature of the palenque named Ronconcholon. Remarkably, it accommodated a mosque for the Muslim slaves within the community. Some members of the group were purportedly Christians, having undergone conversion by their masters. Subsequently, the Spanish forces overwhelmed Ronconcholon, recapturing numerous slaves, including Bayano himself. Transferred to South America, Bayano endured captivity until his demise. In contemporary Panama, King Bayano is reverently regarded as a hero, with a river named in his honor, perpetuating his legacy.
