= Bayano Lake =

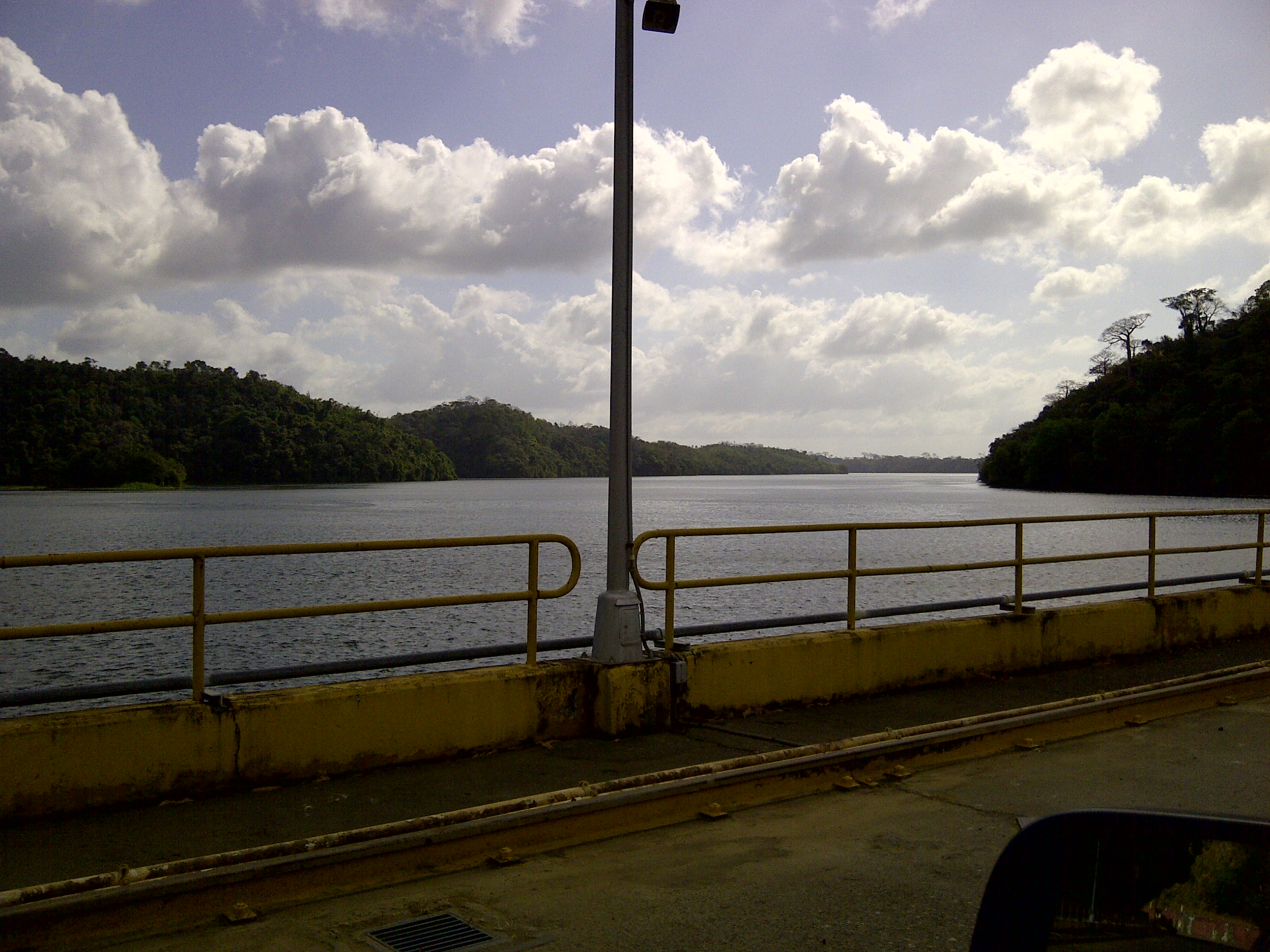

- Location within Panamá Province
- Location: Panamá Province
- Coordinates: 9.15°N 78.76°W
- Type: reservoir
- Primary inflows: Bayano River
- Primary outflows: Bayano River
- Basin countries: Panama
- Surface area: 353 km^{2} (136 sq mi)

Bayano Lake is a reservoir in the eastern part of Panamá Province, Panama created when the Bayano River was dammed in 1976. In terms of surface area, Lake Bayano is the second largest lake in Panama, exceeded only by Lake Gatun.

The lake and river are named after Bayano, the leader of the largest slave revolt of 16th century Panama.

The Bayano Caves are on the south side of the lake.
