= Macho de Monte Dam =

Dam in Panama

- Location within Panama
- Location: Tierras Altas District, Panama
- Coordinates: 8.687590°N 82.608967°W
- Purpose: Power
- Status: Operational
- Opening date: 1939
- Owners: Energía y Servicios de Panamá, S.A. (ESEPSA)

Power Station
- Turbines: 2x Francis-type
- Installed capacity: 2.496 MW
- Annual generation: 11.10 GWh

The Macho de Monte Dam, officially known as Central Hidroeléctrica Macho de Monte, is a hydroelectric power station in Tierras Altas, Chiriquí, Panama. It has an installed capacity of 2.496 MW with a net head of 71.8 metres (236 ft), generating an annual average of 11.10 GWh It is operated and managed by Energía y Servicios de Panamá, S.A. (ESEPSA), which is a part of Naturgy. The dam was rebuilt in 2001 by the new management of the dam.

== History ==
On the 23rd of January, 1929 Mr. Rafael Ariño applied to enter into a contract for the use of the waters of the Macho de Monte River, intending to install and operate a hydroelectric power station. Later that year, on November 10th, the Chiriquí Hydroelectric Company, or Compañía Hidroeléctrica de Chiriquí, was founded, with the aim of establishing a hydroelectric power station on the Macho de Monte River with a capacity of 3000 horsepower, capable of supplying electricity to regions as far as Puerto Armuelles, Pedregal and Boquete.

The company Luis A. Hidalgo y Cía. Ltda.. transferred the rights to build a power station in La Concepción to the Compañía Hidroeléctrica de Chiriquí on the 23th of September 1930, however, the government rejected the application for this new power station on the grounds that it involved a merger of its contracts to provide street lighting in La Concepción via another power station.

In June 1939 the first installment of the Macho de Monte hydroelectric power station was inaugurated, with an initial capacity of 770 KW.

Compañía Hidroeléctrica de Chiriquí declared bankruptcy in 1942, as it lacked the funds to pay a mortgage on assets owed by the company.

Starting September 16th, 1961, IRHE (Instituto de Recursos Hidráulicos y de Electrificación) took over the operation and maintenance of power plants and other electrical facilities in Panama.

In 1998, Distribución Eléctrica Chiriquí, S.A. (EDECHI) was granted the right to operate the Macho de Monte power plant. This generation concession was later transferred to ESEPSA on December 11th, 2006. As part of the efforts to privatize panama's power generation and distribution sectors in the late 1990's, Unión Fenosa, later acquired by Gas Natural, had acquired 51% of the shares of the distribution companies EDEMET and EDECHI for $212 million. The transaction was finalized in 1999.

== Location ==
Section of the canal forming a small pool, commonly used as a bathing place.

The dam is situated on the Macho de Monte River, just upstream of the Macho de Monte Canyon, a popular tourist attraction. A section of the power plant's derivation canal is commonly used as a bathing area.

== Size ==
The dam features a Tyrolean-type, a type that is designed specifically for rivers with a steep gradient and coarse sediment material, which is the case here. During heavy water flows, between 4.0 and 5.0 m³/sec is diverted.

Canal of the Macho de Monte Dam.

The total size of the intake is 9 metres (30 ft) times 1.50 metres (4 ft 11 in), the former of which is equal to the length of the dam. The intake is situated with a 10.00% gradient. The dam does not create a reservoir, as the area upstream of the dam is filled with silt.

The canal begins after the sluice gate at the end of the water intake and has a trapezium-shaped cross-section approximately 5 metres (16 ft) wide, 2 metres (6 ft 7 in) deep and approximately 990 metres (3,250 ft) long. Most of it is not lined and consists of a section of soil containing rocks from the naturally found in the region.

The canal a short distance downstream of the Dam, note the water overflowing back into its natural riverbed.

At the end of the canal begins the steel drop pipe, which has a length of 150 metres (490 ft) and a vertical drop of 71.8 metres (236 ft). The powerhouse is equipped with two horizontal-shaft Francis turbines. The powerhouse is controlled remotely from the Centro de Control de Generación (CCG) vía VSAT, and, situated at the bottom of the canyon, is protected from floods of Macho de Monte River by concrete protective walls. Access to it is provided with a 50 metres (160 ft) high staircase.
