= Santa Marta Bay =

Bay in the Caribbean Sea

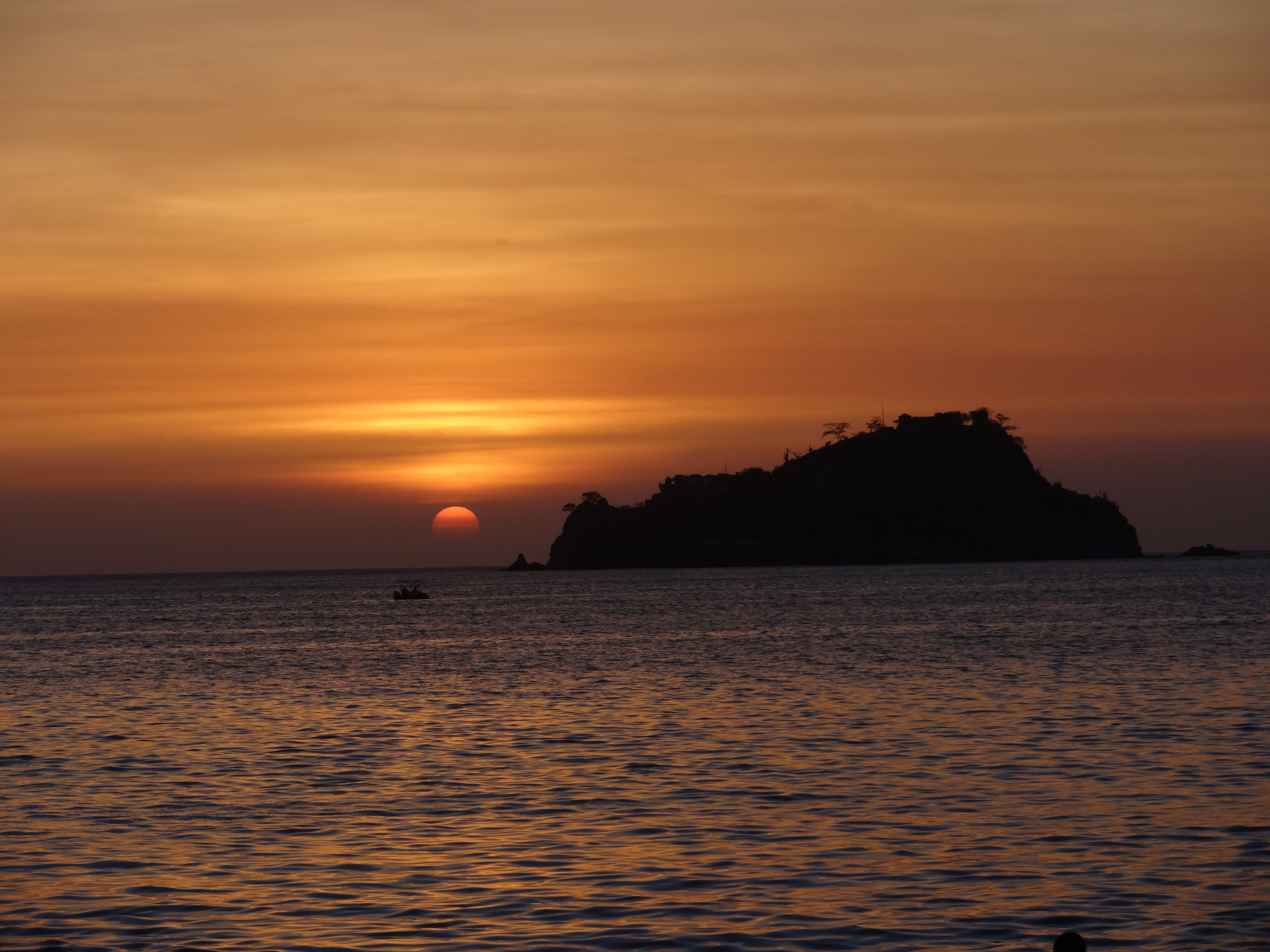

- Location within Colombia
- Location: Santa Marta, Colombia
- Coordinates: 11°14′28″N 74°13′08″W
- Ocean/sea sources: Caribbean Sea
- Basin countries: Colombia

Santa Marta Bay (Spanish: Bahía de Santa Marta) is a bay located in the Caribbean Sea, in northern Magdalena Department of Colombia. Its waters bathe the city of Santa Marta, the country's second port in the Caribbean.

In the vicinity of the bay is the Sierra Nevada de Santa Marta, which is the highest intertropical mountain in the world by the sea.
