= Golfo Dulce =

Golfo Dulce may refer to:

- Golfo Dulce, Costa Rica, the name of an inlet in Costa Rica.
- Lake Izabal, the largest lake in Guatemala which also is known as 'Golfo Dulce'.
