= Fortuna Dam =

Dam in Panama

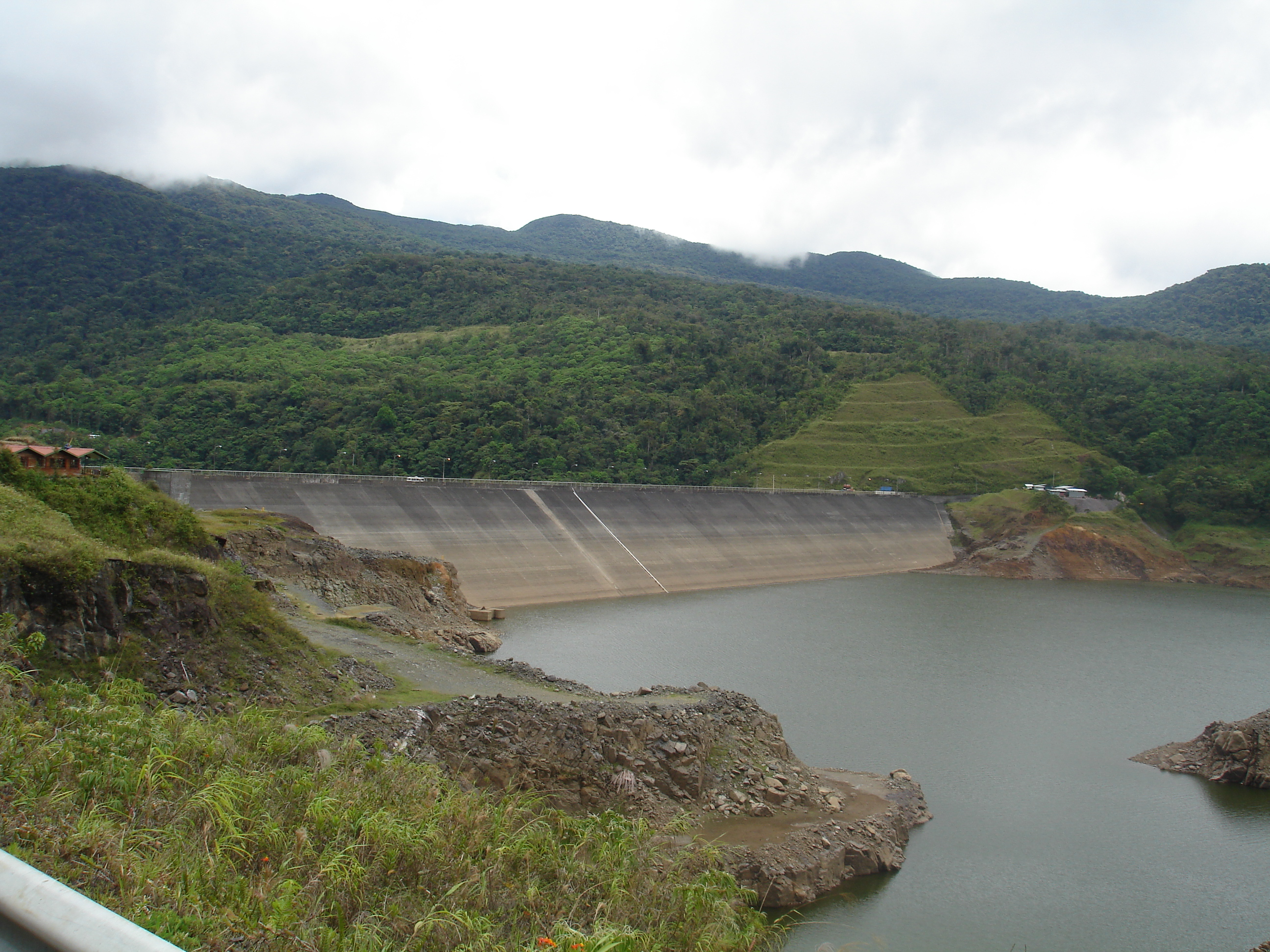
- View of the Fortuna Dam and Reservoir

- Location within Panama
- Official name: Edwin Fabrega Dam
- Coordinates: 8°44′39.48″N 82°14′56.40″W
- Purpose: Power
- Status: Operational
- Opening date: 1984
- Owner: ENEL Green Power

Dam and spillways
- Type of dam: Embankment
- Height: 100 m (328 ft)
- Length: 600 m (1,969 ft)
- Elevation at crest: 1,056 metres (3,465 ft)

Reservoir
- Total capacity: 172,300,000 m^{3} (139,686 acre⋅ft)
- Normal elevation: 1,050 metres (3,440 ft)

Power Station
- Commission date: 1984-1985
- Turbines: 3 x 100 MW Pelton-type
- Installed capacity: 300 MW
- Annual generation: 1,450 GWh

The Fortuna Dam, officially known as Edwin Fabrega Dam, is an embankment dam in western Panama. The original 60-metre (200 ft) tall dam was completed in 1984 but it was raised to 100 metres (330 ft) in height and 600 metres (2,000 ft) in length by 1994 to increase power generation.

It is the single largest energy source in Panama, providing 30% of the country's electricity. The Canadian public utility Hydro-Québec was an initial investor in the project, which was completed in 1984.

The Fortuna Hydroelectric Power Plant consists a rock-filled Embankment dam, the crest of which is located at an elevation of 1,056 metres (3,465 ft) above sea level as well as an underground tunnel and pressure pipes that carry the water towards the machine house, where 3 100MW vertical-axis Pelton-type Turbines generate an average of 1450 GWh a year. The machine house is located at a depth of 440 metres (1,440 ft) below the ground, 242 metres (794 ft) above sea level. A discharge tunnel of 8 kilometres (5.0 mi) discharges the water into Quebrada Barrigón at an elevation of 217 metres (712 ft) above sea level. The total length of the underground facilities from water intake to water discharge is approx. 16 kilometres (9.9 mi).

== See also ==
- List of power stations in Panama
