= Chiriquí River =

Coordinates: 8.3194°N 82.3372°W

Location
- Country: Panama

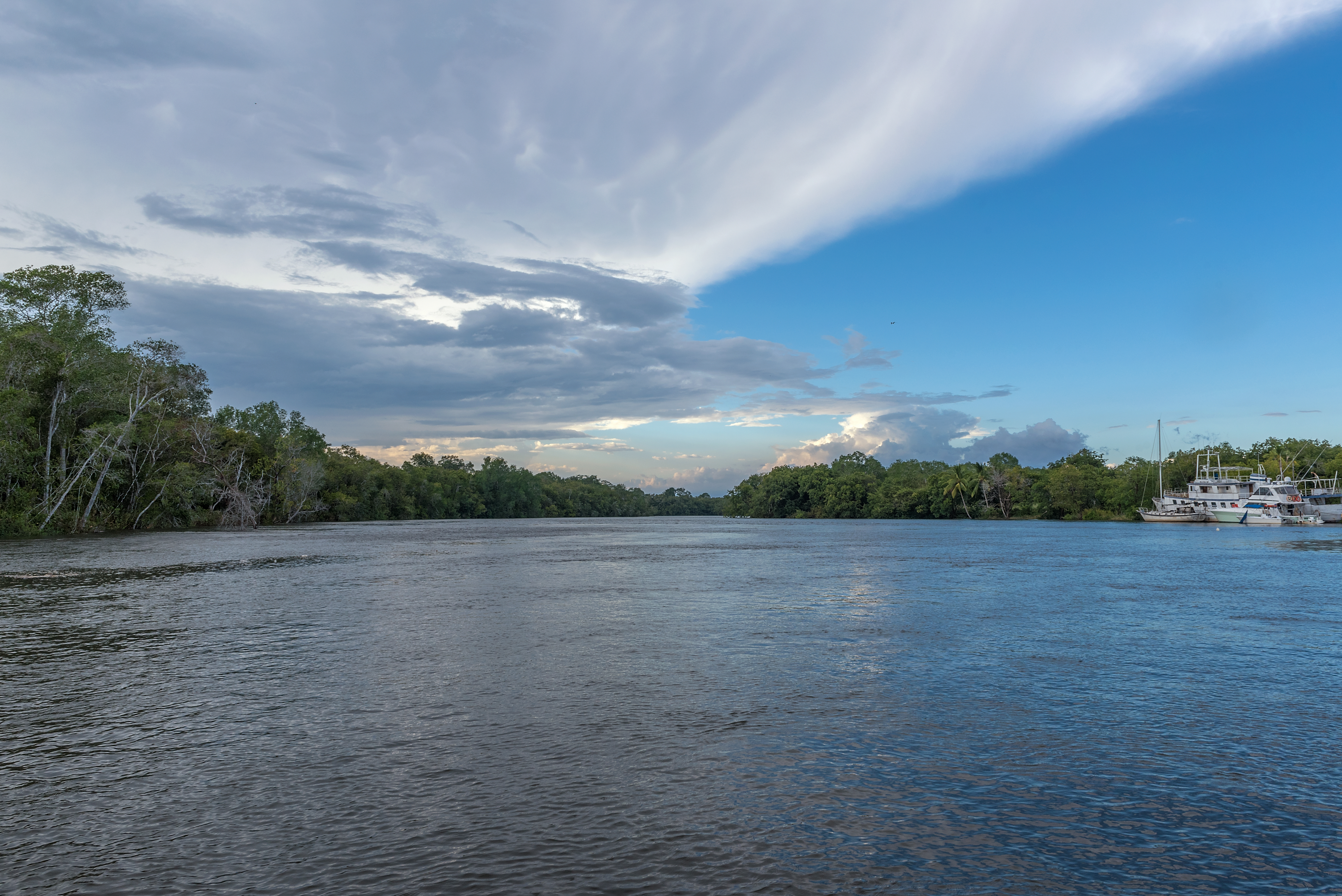

The Chiriquí River is a river of Panama located at Chiriquí province at the districts of Boquete, David, Dolega, and Gualaca. Its length is 130 km. Its principal tributaries are El Platanal, David, Majagua, Cochea, Caldera, Los Valles, El Sitio, Gualaca, and Estí.

== See also ==
- List of rivers of Panama
