= Bayano River =

River in Panama

Coordinates: 9°8′59.5″N 78°19′23.7″W

Bayano River is a river of Panama in the Panamá Province. It is an alternative name for the upper part of the Chepo River.

It is named after Bayano, the leader of a slave revolt and ruler of a kingdom of former slaves in 16th century Panama.

It was dammed in the 1970s, creating Lago Bayano. This dam provides much of the electrical power for Panama City.
