= Central Mexican wetlands =

Flooded grasslands ecoregion of central Mexico

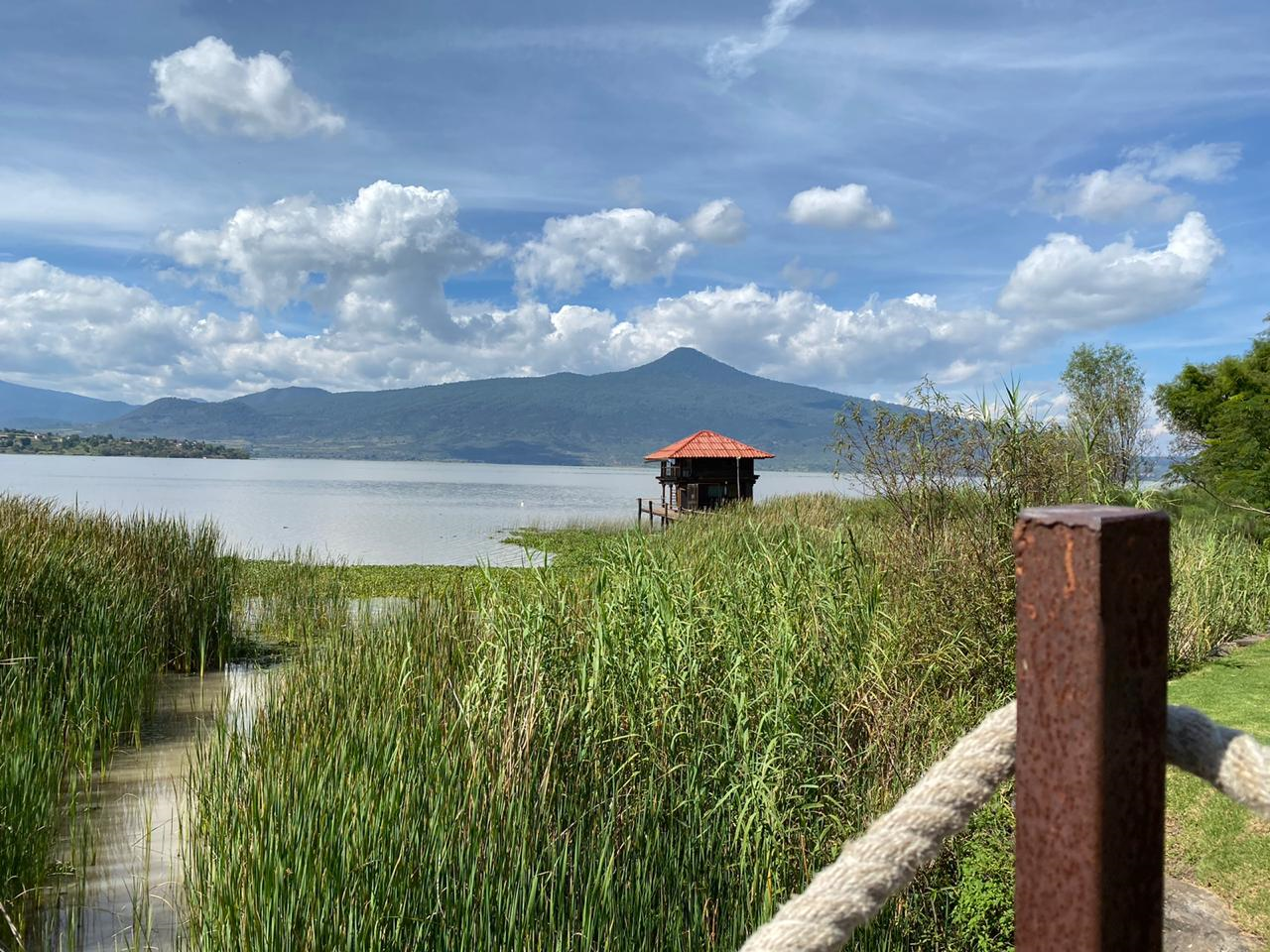
- Lake Pátzcuaro

Ecology
- Realm: Neotropical
- Biome: flooded grasslands and savannas

Geography
- Area: 260 km^{2} (100 mi^{2})
- Country: Mexico
- States: Mexico; Michoacán; Guanajuato; Mexico City

Conservation
- Conservation status: Critical/endangered
- Protected: 100%

The Central Mexican wetlands is a flooded grasslands and savannas ecoregion in central Mexico.

== Geography ==
The Central Mexican wetlands include of several wetland areas where the southern Central Mexican Plateau meets Trans-Mexican Volcanic Belt, an east–west range of volcanic and folded mountains in central Mexico. It consists of several distinct wetland areas:

- Lake Texcoco, in the Valley of Mexico. Lake Texcoco is the last remnant of a what used to be a much larger system of lakes and wetlands in the Valley of Mexico, an endorheic basin. The lake's surface is at 2200 meters elevation.
- The Ciénegas de Lerma, wetlands on the upper Lerma River in the Valley of Toluca. The wetlands cover over 3000 hectares around three shallow lakes, reduced from 27,000 hectares in the late 19th century.
- Lake Pátzcuaro in Michoacán is in an endorheic basin. The lake's surface is at 2037 meters elevation.
- Lake Cuitzeo in Michoacán and Guanajuato is in an endorheic basin. The lake's surface is at 1830 meters elevation.

Lakes Pátzcuaro and Cuitzeo have in the past been connected to the Lerma River system.

== Climate ==
The climate is temperate, with rainfall occurring mostly in the summer. The lower portions of the ecoregion are subhumid, becoming humid at higher elevations in the south.

== Flora ==
The natural vegetation is dense reeds and cattails over two meters tall. Dominant wetland plants include species of Typha, Scirpus, Heleocharis, and Cyperus. Aquatic plants in the lakes and channels include Potamogeton illinoensis, Scirpus pectinatus, tule (Typha latifolia), cattail (Typha domingensis), and Nymphaea mexicana. The willow Salix bonplandiana, known as ahuejote, is a characteristic wetland tree.

The surrounding terrestrial vegetation consists of mostly of xeric scrub – the Bajío dry forests around Lake Cuitzeo, and the Central Mexican matorral in the Valley of Toluca and Valley and Mexico – and pine and oak forests intertwined with xeric scrub around Lake Pátzcuaro.

== Fauna ==
The ecoregion is important habitat for birds. About 200 species are found in the wetlands, including resident and migratory land birds and waterbirds. The black-polled yellowthroat (Geothlypis speciosa) is endemic. Two other endemic species are likely extinct; the yellow rail (Coturnicops noveboracensis) has not been seen since 1964, and the slender-billed grackle (Quiscalus palustris) has not been seen since the early 20th century. The ecoregion corresponds to the Central Mexican marshes endemic bird area.

The Lake Pátzcuaro salamander (Ambystoma dumerilii) is endemic to Lake Patzcuaro, and the axolotl salamander (Ambystoma mexicanum) is endemic to Valley of Mexico's wetlands.

The wetlands support aquatic life. Some commercially-important fish depend on wetlands at one or more of their life stages. Native fish species of the wetlands include the hooded sawfin (Skiffia lermae), Alloophorus robustus, Goodea atripinnis, Neophorus diazi, and ‘pescado blanco’ (Chirostoma estor).

== Conservation and threats ==
The wetlands have been greatly reduced in extent, and the remaining wetlands face numerous threats. Mexico City expanded over most of the former wetland areas in the Valley of Mexico. Water diversion from the upper Lerma River to serve Mexico City and Toluca has reduced freshwater flows into the Ciénegas de Lerma. Evaporation currently exceeds inflows into the closed basin lakes, causing them to recede. Water pollution and siltation also threaten the marshes.

=== Protected areas ===
The Ciénegas del Lerma was designated a flora and fauna protection area in 2002, and a Ramsar site (wetland of international importance) in 2004. 707 hectares of wetland at the southeastern end of Lake Pátzcuaro, known as the Humedales del Lago de Pátzcuaro, was designated a Ramsar site in 2005.

Some canals and chinampas (floating gardens), remnants of former Lake Xochimilco, are preserved in Xochimilco Ecological Park and Plant Market in the Xochimilco neighborhood of Mexico City. The Xochimilco wetlands are a World Heritage Site, and 2,657 hectares were designated a Ramsar site in 2004.
