= El Cimatario National Park =

National park in Mexico

- IUCN category II (national park)
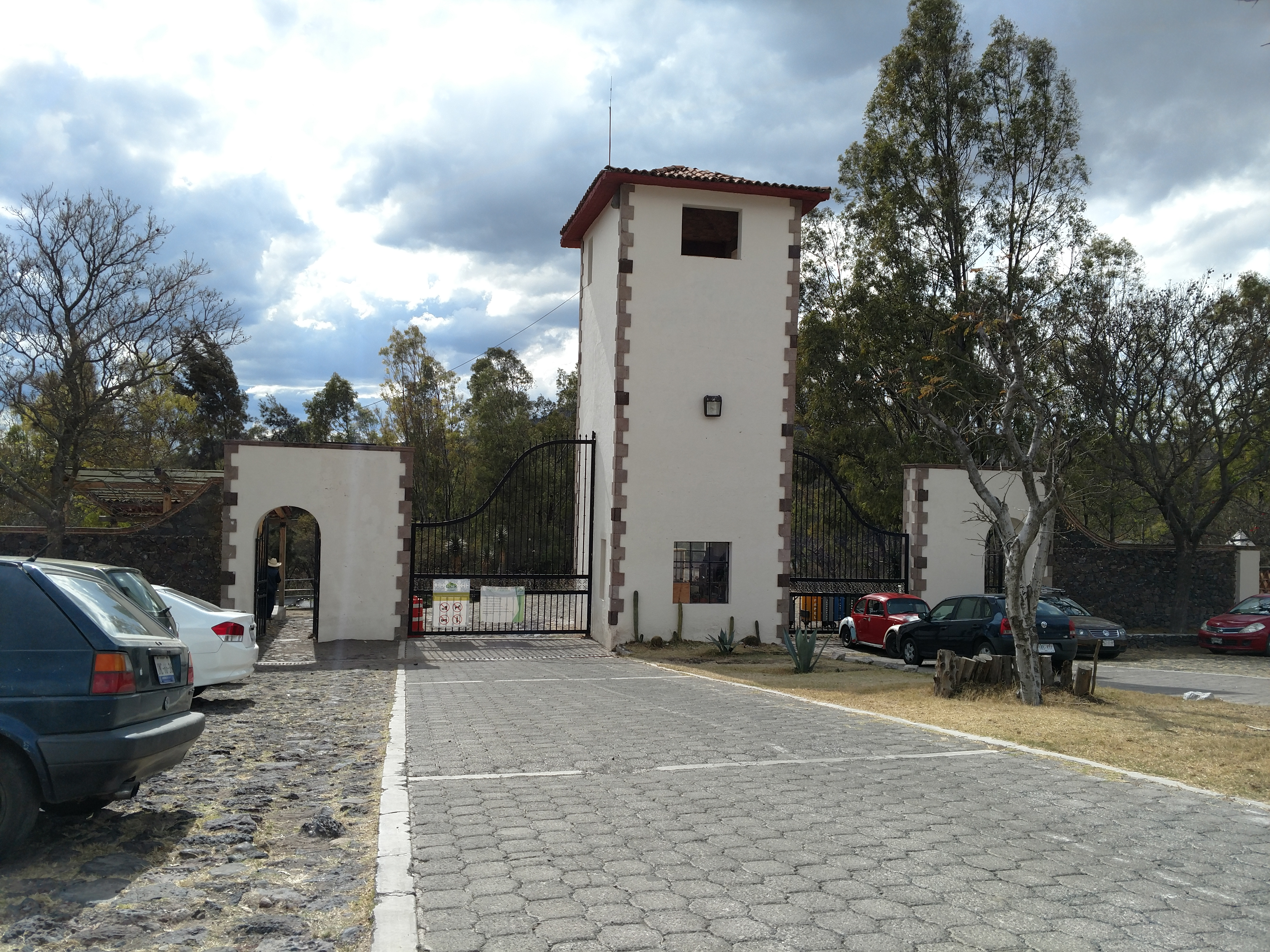
- Entrance to the park

- Location within Mexico
- Location: Querétaro, Mexico
- Nearest city: Santiago de Querétaro
- Coordinates: 20°31′52″N 100°21′34″W
- Area: 24.48 km^{2} (9.45 sq mi)
- Designation: National park
- Designated: 1982
- Administrator: National Commission of Natural Protected Areas

El Cimatario National Park is a national park in Querétaro state of central Mexico. It protects 24.48 km^{2} south of the city of Santiago de Querétaro.

== Geography ==
The park encompasses Cerro del Cimatario, a volcanic mountain which reaches 2400 meters elevation. The mountain offers panoramic views of Santiago de Querétaro and the surrounding countryside, and is home to several radio and television transmitting towers.

Soils in the park are mostly volcanic in origin, formed during Pliocene eruptions. A red porous volcanic rock called tezontle is common, and was quarried to make bricks and construct baths and bread ovens.

== Climate ==
The climate is semi-arid and subtropical to temperate. Rainfall averages 549.3 mm and is seasonal, with a rainy season from June through September. Average annual temperature 18 to 19°C, with a maximum of 22°C in May.

== Flora and fauna ==
El Cimatario National Park includes portions of the Bajío dry forests and Central Mexican matorral ecoregions.

Cactus scrub is the most widespread plant community, found mostly in lower-elevation areas of the park. Shrubs up to four meters in height are the characteristic plants. Common cactus species include Myrtillocactus geometrizans, Opuntia leucotricha, Opuntia imbricata and, Nyctocereus serpentinus. Small trees, which typically have small leaves and spines, include Acacia schaffneri, Acacia farnesiana, Ipomoea mucuroides, Karwinskia humboldtiana, Anisacanthus quadrifidus, Anisacanthus pumilus, Calliandra eriophylla, Condalia velutina, Croton ciliatoglandulifer, and Zaluzania augusta var. rzedowskii.

Tropical dry forest is composed of trees from 4 to 12 meters high which typically lose their leaves during the dry season. Multi-trunked trees are common, and several species have bright-colored exfoliating bark. Typical dry forest tree species in the park include Bursera fagaroides, Bursera palmeri, Cedrela dugesii, Ipomoea murucoides, Erythrina coralloides, Lysiloma divaricatum, Senna polyantha, and Zanthoxylum fagara. The dry forest understory is mostly herbs, including Rivina humilis. Climbing vines are common, and the epiphytes Tillandsia recurvata and Tillandsia calothyrsus grow in the tree canopy.

Induced pasture grows in disturbed areas, including areas that were overgrazed by livestock and quarried for tezontle. Grasses up to 30 cm high are the predominant plants, with Melinis repens, Chloris gayana, Cynodon dactylon, Bromus carinatus, Setaria grisebachii, and Sporobolus atrovirens the most common species, along with scattered shrubs of Eysenhardtia polystachya. There are also reforested areas, which include many introduced species from elsewhere in Mexico and around the world.
