= Central Mexican matorral =

Xeric shrubland ecoregion in Mexico

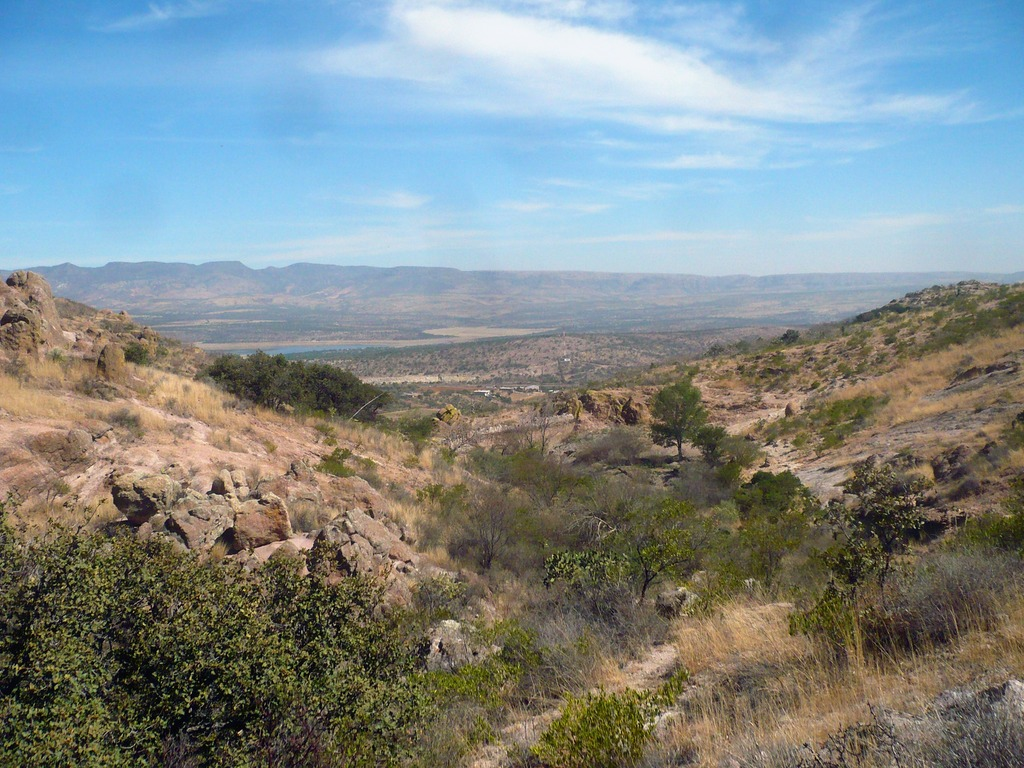
- Near Aguascalientes, Mexico

- Location map for the Central Mexican matorral

Ecology
- Realm: Nearctic
- Biome: deserts and xeric shrublands
- Borders: List: Bajío dry forests; Meseta Central matorral; Sierra Madre Occidental pine–oak forests; Sierra Madre Oriental pine–oak forests; Sinaloan dry forests; Trans-Mexican Volcanic Belt pine-oak forests

Geography
- Area: 59,195 km^{2} (22,855 mi^{2})
- Countries: Mexico
- States: List: Aguascalientes; Guanajuato; Hidalgo; Jalisco; Mexico City; Queretaro; Mexico; San Luis Potosí; Zacatecas

Conservation
- Conservation status: Critical/endangered
- Protected: 1,288 km² (2%)

The Central Mexican matorral is an ecoregion of the deserts and xeric shrublands biome of central Mexico: the southernmost ecoregion of the Nearctic realm.

== Geography ==
The Central Mexican matorral covers an area of 59,400 square kilometers (22,900 sq mi) on the southern portion of the Mexican Plateau.

The Mexican Plateau is bounded on the east by the Sierra Madre Oriental, on the south by the Trans-Mexican Volcanic Belt, and on the west by the Sierra Madre Occidental. The Central Mexican matorral covers much of the southern portion of the plateau, extending from the Valley of Mexico in the southeast to the Bolaños River in the northwest.

The Central Mexican matorral is bounded by the Sierra Madre Oriental pine-oak forests to the east and northeast, the Trans-Mexican Volcanic Belt pine-oak forests to the southeast, and the Sierra Madre Occidental pine-oak forests on the northwest. An isolated enclave of the Central Mexican matorral occupies the Valley of Toluca. The higher mountain ranges of the plateau are home to sky islands of pine-oak forest, isolated by matorral at lower elevations.

To the southwest, the Central Mexican matorral is bounded by tropical dry forests; the Bajío dry forests in the Lerma River basin, and the Sinaloan dry forests in the lower reaches of the Río Grande de Santiago and its tributaries.

To the northwest, the Central Mexican matorral transitions to the Meseta Central matorral, which covers the middle portion of the Mexican Plateau.

The eastern portion of the Central Mexican matorral is drained by the Pánuco River and its tributaries, the central portion by the Lerma River and its tributaries, and the eastern portion by the northern tributaries of the Río Grande de Santiago, including the Rio Verde and Bolaños. The Valley of Mexico is an endorheic basin, which drains into central lakes.

The ecoregion is home to Mexico City, the largest metropolis in North America. Other cities in the ecoregion include Toluca, San Luis Potosí, Aguascalientes, Zacatecas, San Miguel de Allende, Dolores Hidalgo, San Juan del Rio, Pachuca, and Actopan.

== Climate ==
The climate is subtropical and semi-arid, with warm summers and occasional summer rains. Winters are cool, particularly at higher elevations.

== Flora ==
The characteristic vegetation is dry shrubland, called matorral. Cactus and rosette plants are prominent. Cactus include species of prickly pear cactus (Opuntia – Opuntia robusta, Opuntia streptacantha, and Opuntia leucotricha, Ferocactus latispinus, Mammillaria magnimamma, Cylindropuntia imbricata. Rosette plants include agaves like Agave lechuguilla, yuccas, including Yucca filifera and Yucca decipiens, Hechtia podantha, and species of Dasylirion. Other shrubs and low trees include Schinus molle, Acacia farnesiana, and Mimosa biuncifera. Ground cover plants include grasses and herbs.

In the Valley of Mexico, the dominant matorral plants are Opuntia streptacantha, Zaluzania augusta, Yucca filifera, Schinus molle, and Mimosa biuncifera. Halopytic grasslands and low shrubs occur on the valley's saline soils, including the shrub romerito (Suadea mexicana).

== Fauna ==
Native mammals include white-tailed deer (Odocoileus virginianus), coyote (Canis latrans), collared peccary (Pecari tajacu), nine-banded armadillo (Dasypus novemcinctus), Virginia opossum (Didelphis virginiana), southern spotted skunk (Spilogale angustifrons), Mexican cottontail (Sylvilagus cunicularius), desert cottontail (Sylvilagus audubonii), and rock squirrel (Otospermophilus variegatus).

Native birds include great-tailed grackle (Quiscalus mexicanus), mourning dove (Zenaida macroura), Stygian owl (Asio stygius), red-tailed hawk (Buteo jamaicensis), northern harrier (Circus cyaneus), prairie falcon (Falco mexicanus), Harris's hawk (Parabuteo unicinctus), barn owl (Tyto alba), hooded oriole (Icterus cucullatus), and common raven (Corvus corax).

== Protected areas ==
5.4% of the ecoregion is in protected areas. Protected areas include El Gogorrón National Park, Sierra Gorda Biosphere Reserve, Sierra Gorda de Guanajuato Biosphere Reserve, El Cimatario National Park, Los Remedios National Park, El Tepeyac National Park, Molino de Flores Netzahualcóyotl National Park, Sierra de Lobos Sustainable Use Area, Ciénegas de Lerma, Sierra de Álvarez Flora and Fauna Protection Area, and the Cuenca Alimentadora del Distrito Nacional de Riego 043 Estado de Nayarit and Cuenca Alimentadora del Distrito Nacional de Riego 01 Pabellón natural resources protection areas.

== See also ==
- List of ecoregions in Mexico
