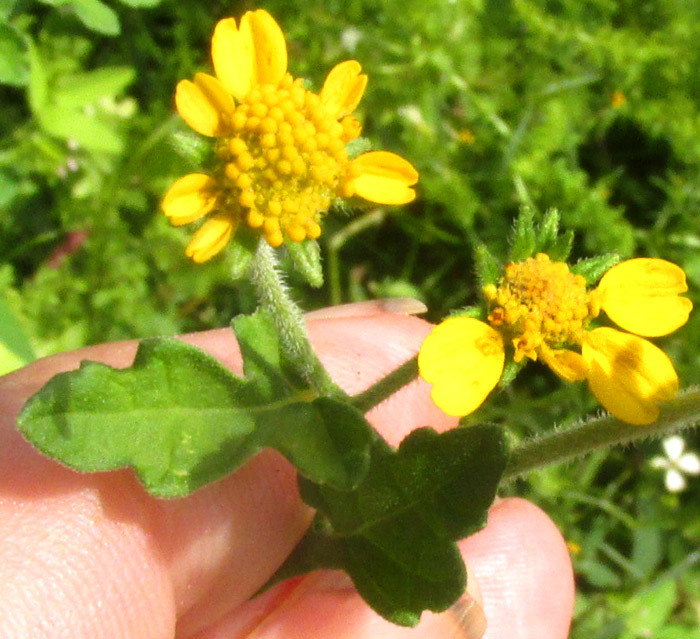
- Flowering heads and upper leaves

Scientific classification
- Kingdom: Plantae
- Clade: Embryophytes
- Clade: Tracheophytes
- Clade: Angiosperms
- Clade: Eudicots
- Clade: Asterids
- Order: Asterales
- Family: Asteraceae
- Tribe: Heliantheae
- Genus: Zaluzania
- Species: Z. triloba

Binomial name
- Zaluzania triloba (Ortega) Pers.

Synonyms
- List: Anthemis triloba Ortega; Amella triloba Spreng.; Anthemis sinuata Cerv.; Zaluzania trilobata Hoffmanns.

= Zaluzania triloba =

Species of plant

Zaluzania triloba, with no commonly used English name, is a species of weedy wildflower native only to Mexico. It belongs to the family Asteraceae.

== Description ==
Zaluzania triloba is a herbaceous and perennial plant reaching 1.5 m (4 ft 11 in) in height. The odor of its herbage is strong enough for one of its Spanish names to be hediondilla, or "little stinker." Here are more notable features:

- Its branched stems bear hairlike trichomes up to 1.5 mm (1/16 in) long often interspersed with shorter glandular ones.
- Leaves with trichomes of various forms have petioles up to 5 cm (2 in) long with blades up to 15 cm (6 in) long and 6 cm (2 1/2 in) wide. They are more or less triangular-oval in general shape with larger leaves deeply divided into 3 primary lobes, and the lobes themselves deeply lobed with rounded tips. Blade upper surfaces are darker green than the lower.
- Few floral heads are grouped near stem tips on peduncles up to 5 cm (2 in) long. Each head is subtended by about 8 slender outer bracts, with a series of shorter bracts just above them. Florets with yellow corollas arise on cone-shaped reptacles, with the base of each floret beside a scale-like bract, a "palea". At the head's perimeter usually about 8 flat, petal-like "ray florets" up to 11 mm (3/8 in) long radiate from head's "eye," which consists of as many as 80 "disc florets" with cylindrical corollas and only up to 2.5 mm (1/8 in) high. Usually both floret types are fertile.
- Fruits are one-seeded, cypsela-type cypselae.

== Distribution ==
Zaluzania triloba is endemic just to Mexico, as far north as the states of Coahuila and Nuevo León, and as far south as the states of Oaxaca and Puebla.

== Habitat ==
In central Mexico Zaluzania triloba appears to prefer calcareous soils between 1900 and 2250 meters in elevation (6200-7400 feet). Sometimes it's abundant in certain scrub and grassland areas, and in disturbed, weedy places.

== Human interactions ==
=== In traditional medicine ===
In central Mexico it has been used as an anti-inflammatory, and for stomach pain as well as for wounds infected with worms in animals. Also it is used to abort pregnancy.

=== In traditional steam baths ===
For a traditional steam bath, the baño de temazcal, of indigenous people of the central Mexican highlands, Zaluzania triloba -- known as kandaxensa locally -- is one of a mixture of herbs boiled in water to make the steam. Three stems of the plant 25 cm (9.8 in) long with 8 other herbs are boiled in 20 liters (21 US quarts) for 20 minutes as the bath takes place. Afterwards, one bathes in this water three times every 3-8 days. The bath is particularly advised for mothers after giving birth. The bath also serves as a general curative, to prevent a range of health problems, and as a part of religious ceremonies.

=== As a weed ===
Zaluzania triloba is a weed in Mexican cornfields.

=== In land remediation ===
Zaluzania triloba has a potential for revegetating soil contaminated with cadmium, copper, manganese, nickel, lead and zinc.

== Taxonomy ==
The species Zaluzania triloba was named and described in 1807 by Christiaan Hendrik Persoon as he erected the genus Zaluzania while transferring Anthemis triloba into it. Anthemis triloba earlier had been named and described by Casimiro Gómez Ortega in 1798.

In 1979, Zaluzania triloba was lumped with the species Zaluzania parthenioides, but now the two taxa are recognized again as separate species.

=== Etymology ===
Inspiration for the genus name Zaluzania wasn't explained when the genus was erected, but a good bet is that it honors the Czech botanist and physician Adam Zalužanský of Zalužany.

The species name triloba is New Latin based on the word trilobus which in both Latin and Greek means "three-lobed."

== Gallery ==
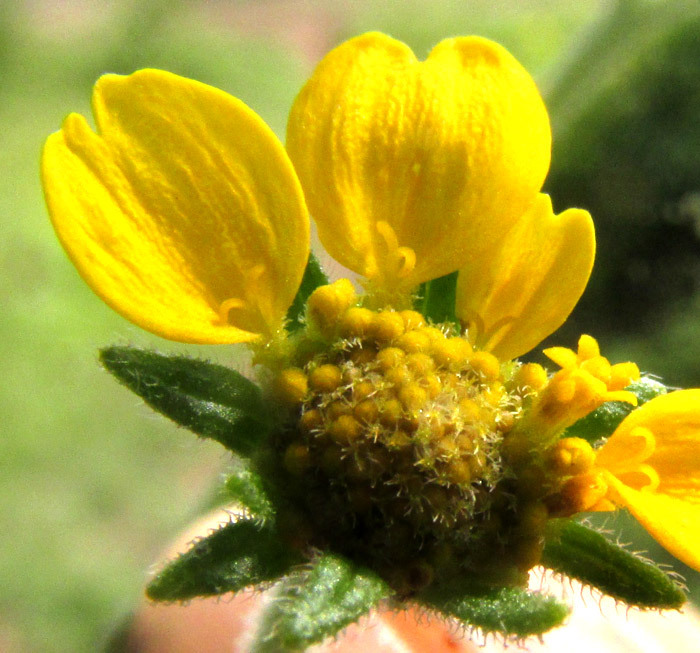
floral head, some florets not yet developed

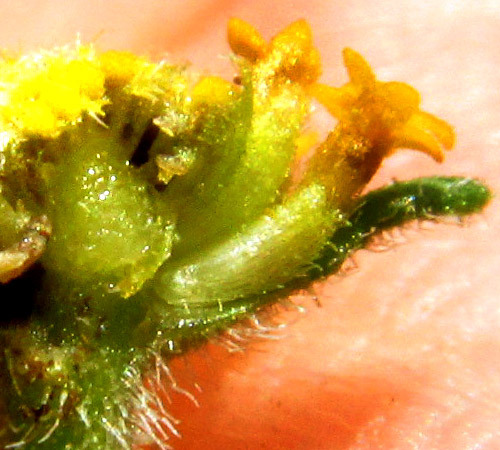
floral head cross section showing conical receptacle and cypsela

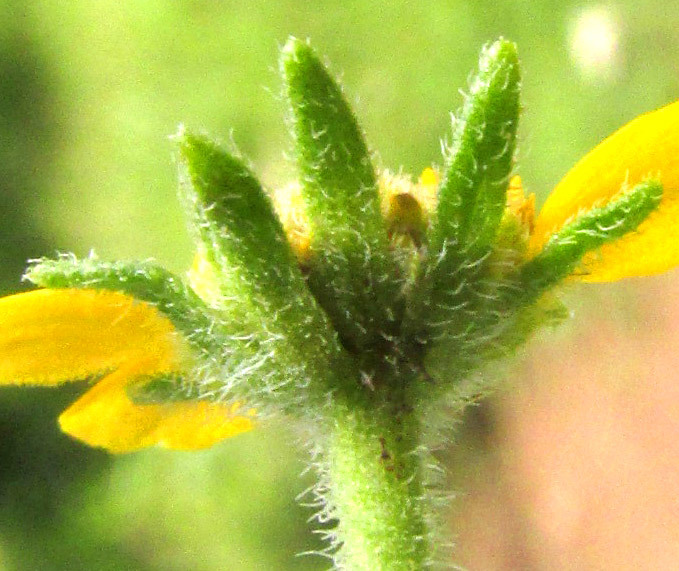
bracts below floral head

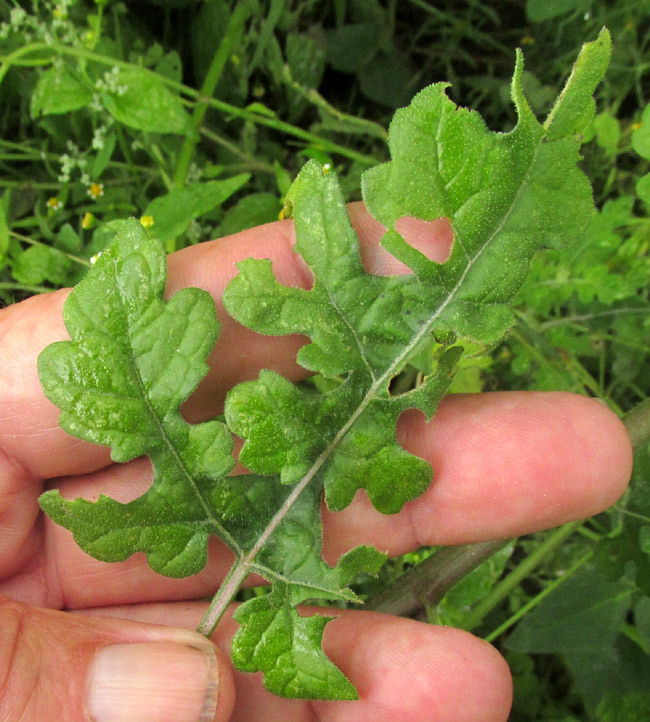
3-parted, deeply lobed leaf

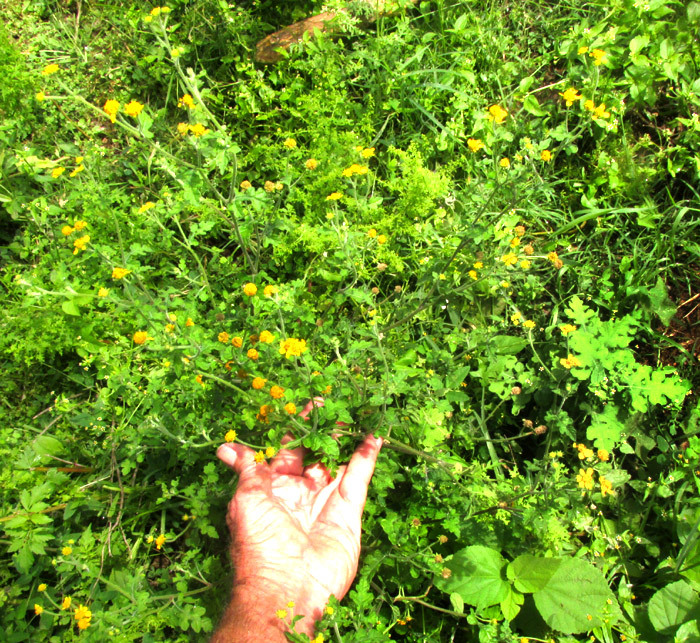
in weedy habitat
