= Hybridella globosa =

- Hybridella globosa, as weed along dirt road

Scientific classification
- Kingdom: Plantae
- Clade: Tracheophytes
- Clade: Angiosperms
- Clade: Eudicots
- Clade: Asterids
- Order: Asterales
- Family: Asteraceae
- Tribe: Heliantheae
- Genus: Hybridella
- Species: H. globosa

Binomial name
- Hybridella globosa (Ortega) Cass.

Synonyms
- Acmella globosa (Ortega) Spreng.; Anthemis globosa Ortega; Chiliophyllum globosum (Ortega) DC.; Zaluzania globosa (Ortega) Sch.Bip.

Species of Asteraceae

Hybridella globosa, with no English name, is native only to Mexico. It belongs to the family Asteraceae.

== Description ==
Hybridella globosa, with its frilly, deeply divided leaves which issue a medicinal odor when crushed, suggests a yellow-flowered, Common Yarrow. However, within the family they are not closely related. Here are key features of Hybridella globosa which, altogether, make it a distinctive and interesting species:

- It is a perennial remaining herbaceous which stands more or less erect up to 60 cm (24 in) tall. Its vegetative parts are long-hairy, sometimes stiffly so, with shorter hairs bearing glands.
- Lower leaves are up to 20 cm (7.9 in) long and finely divided 3 or 4 times; they are pinnatisect, with ultimate parts not over 1 mm (1/32 in) wide. In overall shape the leaves tend to be widest above their middles. Upper leaves are similar but much smaller.
- Inflorescences usually develop branches, but not always. Floral heads appear at the ends of branches on peduncles up to 20 cm (8 in) long. About 15 broad involucral bracts of nearly the same length and covered with long hairs subtend the yellow to orangish florets.
- At the head's perimeter 20 to 40 flat, petal-like "ray florets" up to 13 mm (1/2 in) long radiate from head's "eye," which consists of as many as 300 "disc florets" with cylindrical corollas; the disc florets are arranged on a dome-like structure, the receptacle. Ray florets have no male parts but are fertile, while disc florets bear both male and female parts and are fertile. The ray florets' flat corollas usually are notched at their tips. Cypselae bear no pappuses, but there are slender, scale-like bracts, the "paleae," up to 4 mm (3/16 in) long, between florets. Mature cypselae are hairless and about 2 mm (1/16 in) long.

== Distribution ==
Hybridella globosa is endemic just to Mexico's states of Aguascalientes, Durango, Guanajuato, Hidalgo, Jalisco, México, Puebla, Querétaro, San Luis Potosí, Tlaxcala, Veracruz and Zacatecas.

== Habitat ==
Hybridella globosa is found in ditches, banks of arroyos and other places with moist soil, as well as in pastures and disturbed, weedy areas.

== In traditional medicine ==
Little or no information is available online about useful properties of Hybridella globosa. However, before 2012, species of the genus Hybridella often were treated as species of Zaluzania, and several Zaluzania species are used in traditional Mexican medicine because of their antidiabetic and abortifacient qualities. They have been used to treat stomach pain and wounds, and to fumigate poultry houses infested with red mites. Infusions have been used to wash wormy wounds in sheep and goats. The medicinal-smelling herbage of Hybridella globosa suggests that in traditional medicine Hybridella globosa may find similar uses.

== Taxonomy ==
In 1797, Casimiro Gómez Ortega formally described and named Hybridella globosa under the basionym Anthemis globosa.

=== Varieties ===
As of 2026, two varieties of Hybridella globosa were accepted:

- Hybridella globosa var. globosa
- Hybridella globosa var. myriophylla

=== Etymology ===
The genus name Hybridella is constructed of the Latin hybrida, meaning "hybrid" and -ella, which is a word-forming element from the Latin -ella characterizing something small or diminutive. Thus, "a small hybrid." Henri Cassini, who named the genus, explained that species in the genus seemed to be intermediate between the tribe Heliantheae and the tribe Anthemideae, like hybrids.

The species name globosa is a form of the Latin word used by Casimiro Gómez Ortega to describe the domed receptacle of the floral heads of Hybridella globosa: he wrote "...receptaculis globosis."

== Gallery ==
flowering head

disc florets

ray florets with notched tips

involucral bracts

cypselae without pappuses beside paleae, atop domed receptacle

plant with inflorescence

hairy, finely divided leaf
