= Bush croton =

Bush croton is a common name for several plants and may refer to:

- Croton ciliatoglandulifer
- Croton fruticulosus
