= Sierra de Lobos =

Mountain range in Mexico

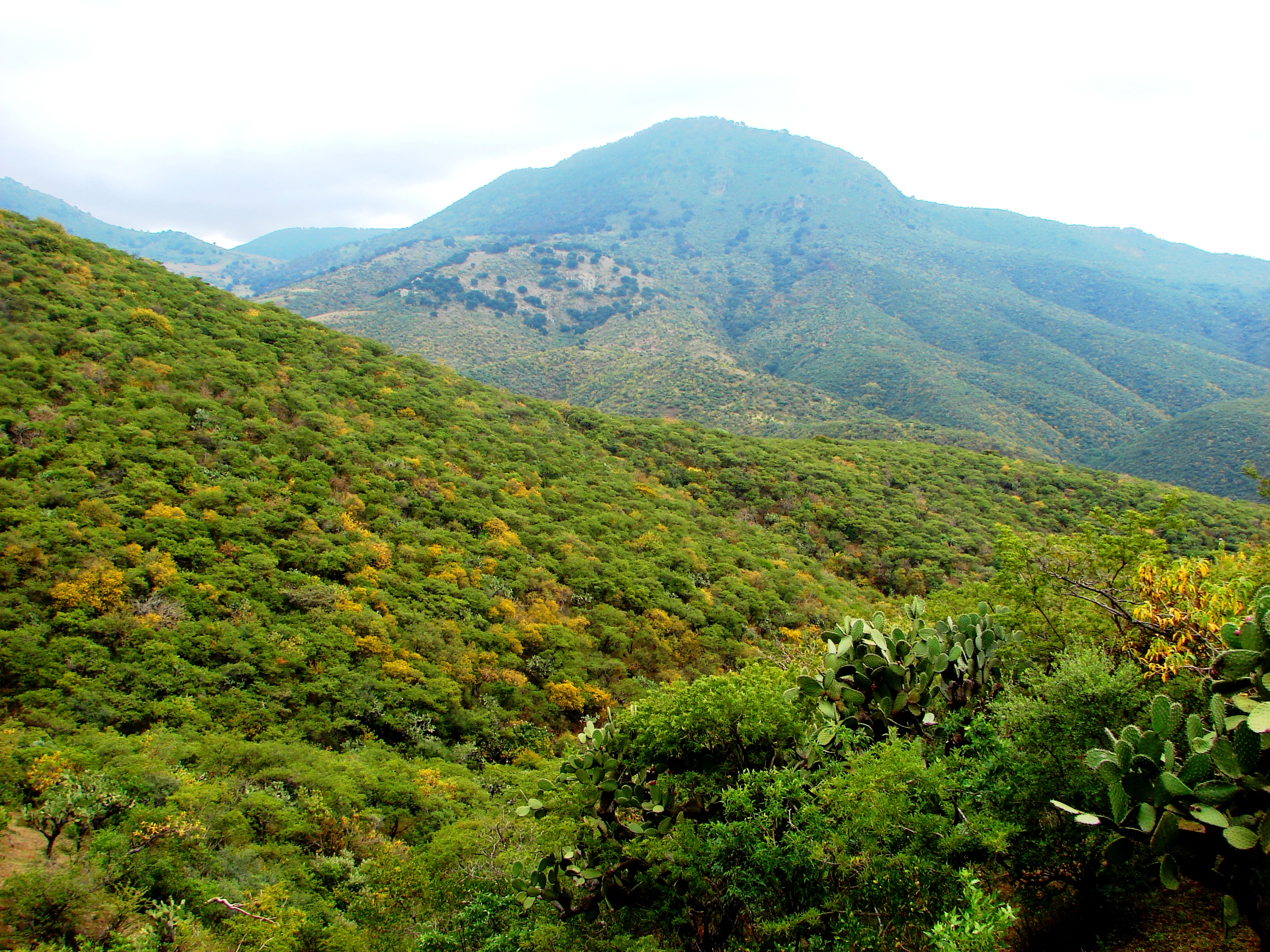
- Matorral (shrubland) in autumn

Highest point
- Coordinates: 21°20′00″N 101°37′35″W

Geography
- Location within Mexico
- Country: Mexico
- State: Guanajuato
- Municipalities: León, San Felipe and Ocampo

Sierra de Lobos is a mountain range in Guanajuato state of central Mexico, The mountains rise north of León. The range is a protected natural area, and provides surface water, groundwater recharge, wildlife habitat, and recreation for the surrounding region.

== Geography ==
The Sierra de Lobos are part of the Sierra Central, a belt of low mountains which extend northwest–southeast through central Guanajuato state. They separate the Bajío plain to the south from the higher Mexican Plateau to the north. The Sierra is part of the Lerma-Santiago basin. The Turbio River, a tributary of the Lerma, drains the southern slopes and runs through León, and the Río San Juan de los Lagos drains the northwestern Sierra.

== Flora and fauna ==
The natural vegetation includes tropical dry forest, thorn scrub, semi-thorn scrub, and chaparral at lower elevations, and oak and pine–oak forest at higher elevations.

The Sierra is an important habitat for wildlife. 34 mammal species, 181 bird species, and 39 reptile species have been recorded in the Sierra. Native mammals include white-tailed deer (Odocoileus virginianus), Peters's squirrel (Sciurus oculatus), and Mexican long-nosed bat (Leptonycteris nivalis). Resident and migratory birds include peregrine falcon (Falco peregrinus), great horned owl (Bubo virginianus), and American wigeon (Mareca americana). Native reptiles include the Querétaro dusky rattlesnake (Crotalus aquilus), rough-footed mud turtle (Kinosternon hirtipes), and mesquite lizard (Sceloporus grammicus).

== Conservation ==
The Sierra de Lobos was designated a sustainable use area in 1997. It has an area of 1270.58 km^{2}.
