= Quercus alpescens =

Conservation status
- Data Deficient (IUCN 3.1)

Scientific classification
- Kingdom: Plantae
- Clade: Embryophytes
- Clade: Tracheophytes
- Clade: Spermatophytes
- Clade: Angiosperms
- Clade: Eudicots
- Clade: Rosids
- Order: Fagales
- Family: Fagaceae
- Genus: Quercus
- Subgenus: Quercus subg. Quercus
- Section: Quercus sect. Quercus
- Species: Q. alpescens

Binomial name
- Quercus alpescens Trel.

Species of oak tree

Quercus alpescens is a species of oak endemic to northeastern Mexico.

== Description ==
Quercus alpescens is a large shrub, which grows from one to three meters tall.

== Range and habitat ==
Quercus alpescens is known from a few locations in the Sierra Madre Oriental and isolated ranges on the Mexican Plateau east of the Sierra, including Mount Kankandó in Hidalgo state, Cerro Temeroso in Zacatecas, and Cerro Potosí in Nuevo León. It generally grows at high-elevations, up to 3,200 meters. On Cerro Potosí it generally grows on limestone-derived soils.
