= Quercus aerea =

Conservation status
- Data Deficient (IUCN 3.1)

Scientific classification
- Kingdom: Plantae
- Clade: Embryophytes
- Clade: Tracheophytes
- Clade: Spermatophytes
- Clade: Angiosperms
- Clade: Eudicots
- Clade: Rosids
- Order: Fagales
- Family: Fagaceae
- Genus: Quercus
- Subgenus: Quercus subg. Quercus
- Section: Quercus sect. Lobatae
- Species: Q. aerea

Binomial name
- Quercus aerea Trel.

Species of oak tree

Quercus aerea is a species of oak endemic to Mexico. It is native to the Mexican Plateau, in the states of San Luis Potosí and Chihuahua.
