= Matorral =

Mediterranean climate ecosystem in Southern Europe

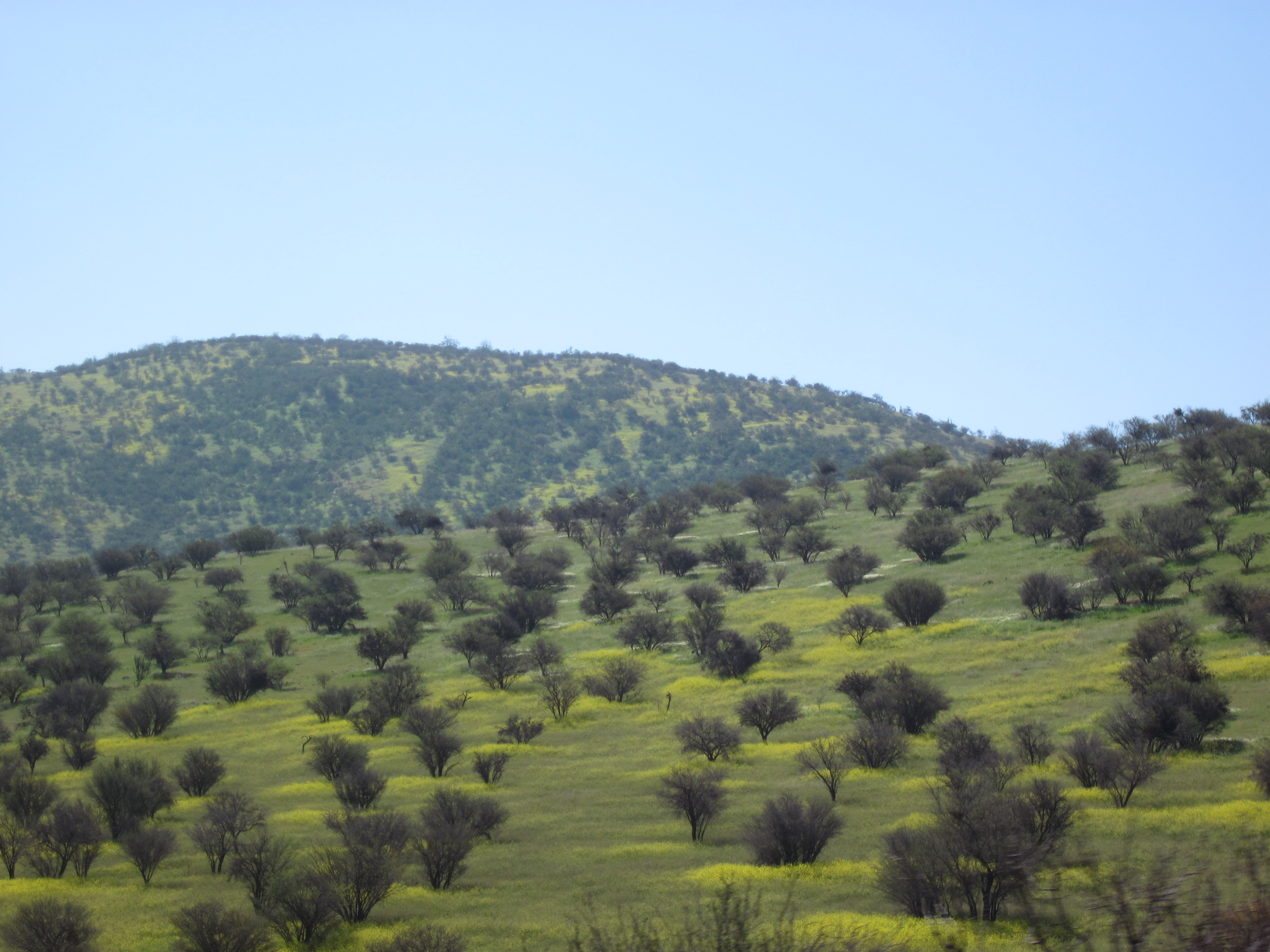
Springtime in Chilean matorral a few kilometers north of Santiago along the Pan-American Highway

Matorral is a Spanish word which, along with the near-synonymous tomillares, broadly applies to shrubland, thicket, or bushes. It is used in naming and describing a Mediterranean climate ecosystem in Southern Europe.

== Mediterranean region ==
Matorral originally referred to the matorral shrublands and woodlands in the Mediterranean climate regions of Spain and other Mediterranean Basin countries. These scrub shrublands and woodlands are a plant community and a distinct habitat. Other common general names for this Mediterranean region shrubland habitat ecosystem are maquis and garrigue in France, macchia Mediterranea in Italy, phrygana in Greece, mato Portugal, batha in Israel. The term is now used more broadly to include similar bio-assemblages wherever they occur.

In Portugal, the term mato or matagal is used to refer to the scrublands, or heaths, that formed on the Cambrian and Silurian schists in the north and central parts of Portugal.

Mediterranean matorral shrublands are often part of a mosaic landscape, interspersed with forests, woodlands, grasslands, and scrublands.

== Americas ==
The term matorral followed the Spanish colonization of the Americas and is used to refer to Mediterranean climate woodlands and scrub, as well as xeric shrublands ecosystems in Mexico, Chile, and elsewhere.

There are Chilean Matorral areas in central Chile, including portions of La Campana National Park.

The Central Mexican matorral, Meseta Central matorral, Tamaulipan matorral, and Tehuacán Valley matorral are xeric shrubland ecoregions of Mexico.

The Portuguese term mato was imported to colonial eastern South America, where it was used to refer to the great scrublands, savannas, and flooded grasslands region called the Mato Grosso, in present-day western Brazil.

The Spanish term chaparral is used in southern Oregon and California in the US and northern Baja in Mexico referring to similar scrublands and climate.

== Australia ==
The Aboriginal term mallee refers both to Australian biogeographic semi-arid areas with consistent winter rainfall and to the many eucalyptus species that inhabit them. These areas are in the Murray Basin, covering parts of the states of South Australia, Victoria and New South Wales, also in the Eyre Peninsula of South Australia and in Southern Western Australia where they also use the Aboriginal term kwongan.

== Popular usage ==
The regional Mexican band Los Tigres Del Norte used the term matorrales, the plural form of matorral, in its famous song "Pacas De A Kilo," an example of an infamous narcocorridos, or drug ballads.

== See also ==
- Maquis shrubland
- Category:Mediterranean forests, woodlands, and scrub
