= Meseta Central matorral =

Xeric shrubland ecoregion in Mexico

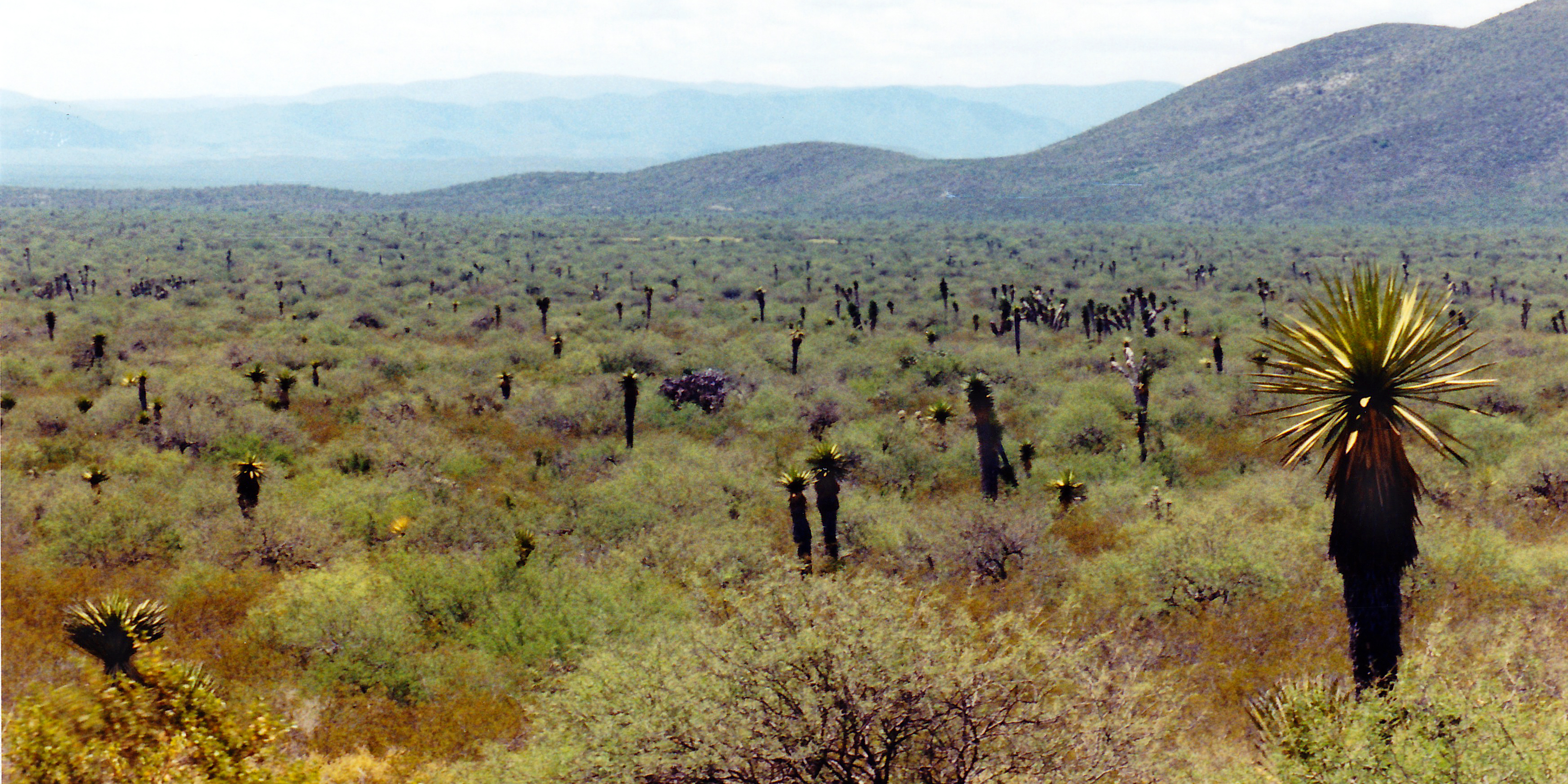
- Municipality of Tula, Tamaulipas, Mexico (2003)

- Location map for the Meseta Central matorral

Ecology
- Realm: Nearctic
- Biome: deserts and xeric shrublands
- Borders: Central Mexican matorral; Chihuahuan Desert; Sierra Madre Occidental pine–oak forests, Sierra Madre Oriental pine–oak forests

Geography
- Area: 124,975 km^{2} (48,253 mi^{2})
- Countries: Mexico
- States: Coahuila; Durango; Hidalgo; Nuevo León; Querétaro; San Luis Potosí; Tamaulipas; Zacatecas

Conservation
- Conservation status: Vulnerable
- Protected: 2,534 km² (2%)

The Meseta Central matorral is a deserts and xeric shrublands ecoregion located in north-central Mexico.

== Geography ==
The Meseta Central matorral occupies the central portion of the Mexican Plateau. It is bounded on the east by the Sierra Madre Oriental. The Sierra de Arteaga, Serranía de Zapalinamé, Sierra La Concordia, and Sierra de Parras ranges separate the ecoregion from the Chihuahuan Desert to the north. The Sierra Madre Occidental bounds the ecoregion on the west. On the south it transitions to the Central Mexican matorral.

Most of the ecoregion is in endorheic basins, where streams drain into saline lakes with no outlet to the sea, including the Llanos el Salado and Bolsón de Mapimí. The western portion of the ecoregion is in the valley of the San Pedro Mezquital River, which drains southwestwards into the Pacific. The southeastern portion of the ecoregion is in the Panuco River basin, which drains eastwards into the Gulf of Mexico.

The cities of Durango, Fresnillo, Matehuala, and Rioverde are in the ecoregion.

== Climate ==
The climate is hot and dry. Rainfall is less than 500 mm per year.

== Flora ==
The characteristic vegetation is dry shrubland (matorral) that includes yucca and cactus. Characteristic species include the yuccas izote (Yucca filifera), chocha (Yucca carnerosana), and Yucca decipiens, and creosote bush (Larrea tridentata), known in Spanish as la gobernadora. Other common species are the shrubs huisache (Acacia farnesiana), sangre de drago (Jatropha dioica), desert mimosa (Mimosa turneri), and mesquite (Prosopis juliflora), the cacti Opuntia engelmannii, Echinocactus horizonthalonius, and Echinocereus conglomeratus, and the grasses Bouteloua gracilis and hairy woollygrass (Erioneuron pilosum). In the northern part of the ecoregion near the transition to the Chihuahuan desert, the dominant plant community is creosote bush and hojasén (Flourensia cernua).

== Fauna ==
Native mammals include coyote (Canis latrans), desert mule deer (Odocoileus hemionus eremicus), Mexican prairie dog (Cynomys mexicanus), yellow-faced pocket gopher (Orthogeomys spp.), and Saussure's shrew (Sorex saussurei). The ecoregion has resident and migratory bats. The greater long-nosed bat (Leptonycteris nivalis) and lesser long-nosed bat (Leptonycteris yerbabuenae) are important spring and summer pollinators for many plants, including the yuccas, agaves, and cactus. The western yellow bat (Lasiurus xanthinus) is an insectivorous resident bat.

Native birds include the greater roadrunner (Geococcyx californianus), golden eagle (Aquila chrysaetos canadensis), great horned owl (Bubo virginiana), spotted owl (Strix occidentalis), red-tailed hawk (Buteo jamaicensis), peregrine falcon (Falco peregrinus), scaled quail (Callipepla squamata), and Worthen's sparrow (Spizella wortheni).

== Protected areas ==
A 2017 assessment found that 2,534 km^{2}, or 2%, of the ecoregion is in protected areas. The lower elevations of Durango's Sierra de Órganos National Park are in the ecoregion. Barranca de Metztitlán Biosphere Reserve is in the southeastern portion the ecoregion.

== See also ==
- List of ecoregions in Mexico
