= Hybridella =

- Hybridella globosa, as weed along dirt road

Scientific classification
- Kingdom: Plantae
- Clade: Tracheophytes
- Clade: Angiosperms
- Clade: Eudicots
- Clade: Asterids
- Order: Asterales
- Family: Asteraceae
- Subfamily: Asteroideae
- Tribe: Heliantheae
- Subtribe: Zaluzaniinae
- Genus: Hybridella; Cass.

Type species
- Anthemis globosa Ortega

Synonyms
- Chiliophyllum DC. 1836, rejected name, not Phil. 1864

Genus of flowering plants

Hybridella is a genus of Mexican flowering plants in the family Asteraceae.

Species

- Hybridella anthemidifolia (B.L.Rob. & Greenm.) Olsen - Jalisco
- Hybridella globosa (Ortega) Cass. - San Luis Potosí, Durango, Hidalgo, Zacatecas
