= Turbio River (Mexico) =

Turbio River, Mexico

Location
- Country: Mexico

Physical characteristics
- Source
  - location: Sierra de Lobos
- Mouth
  - location: Lerma River

The Turbio River is a river in Guanajuato state of central Mexico. The Turbio originates in the Sierra de Lobos, in northwestern Guanajuato near the border with Jalisco. It flows southwards through the city of León. It turns eastwards to flow around the Sierra de Pénjamo, then southwards again to empty into the Lerma River.

== See also ==
- List of rivers of Mexico
