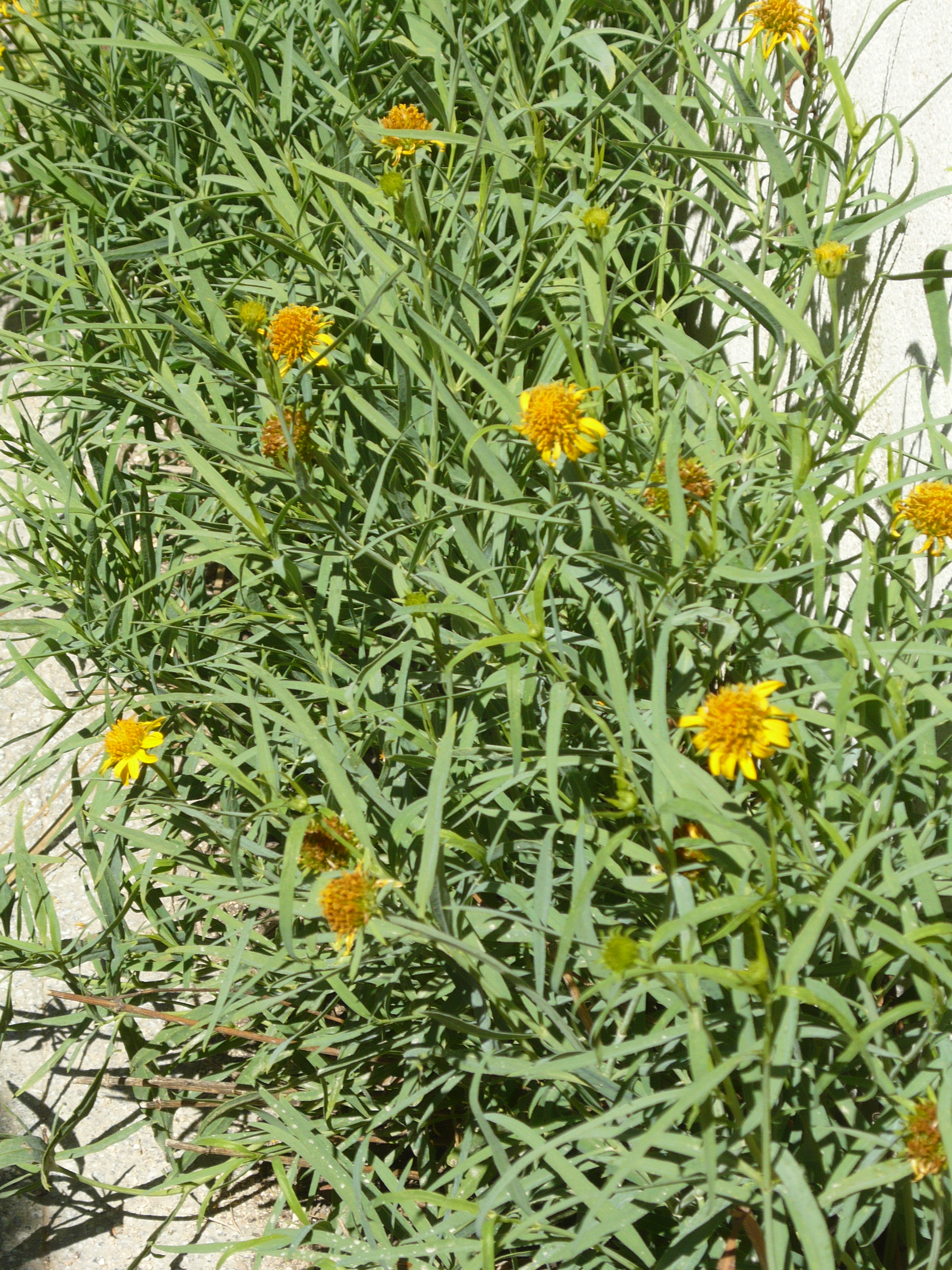
- Pascalia glauca

Scientific classification
- Kingdom: Plantae
- Clade: Tracheophytes
- Clade: Angiosperms
- Clade: Eudicots
- Clade: Asterids
- Order: Asterales
- Family: Asteraceae
- Subtribe: Ecliptinae
- Genus: Pascalia; Ortega

Type species
- Pascalia glauca Ortega

Synonyms
- Lorentzia Griseb.

= Pascalia =

Genus of flowering plants

Pascalia is genus of flowering plants belonging to the family Asteraceae.

It is native to South America, and found in (north-eastern, north-western and southern) Argentina, Bolivia, Chile, Paraguay and Uruguay. It has been introduced the following regions, Alabama, Florida, Georgia, (in USA), the Northern Provinces (South Africa), Palestine, Portugal, Spain, South Australia, New South Wales and Victoria (in Australia).

The genus name of Pascalia is in honour of Diego Baldassare Pascal (1768–1812), a French-born Italian doctor and botanist. He was also professor of botany in Parma and botanical garden director. It was first described and published in Nov. Rar. Pl. Descr. Dec. on page 39 in 1797.

== Known species ==
According to Kew;

- Pascalia glauca Ortega
- Pascalia subvaginata (N.E.Br.) Strother
