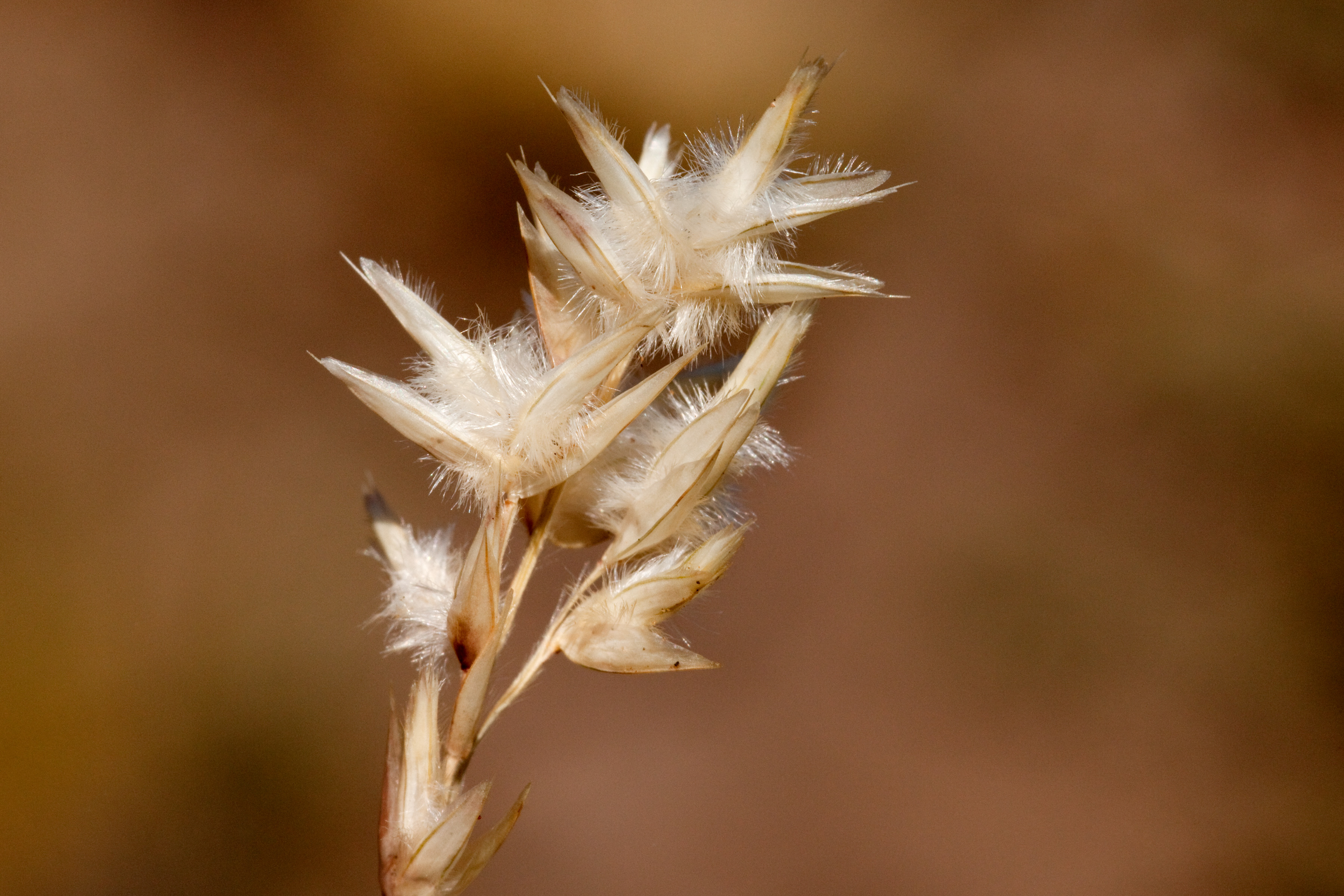
- Erioneuron avenaceum

Scientific classification
- Kingdom: Plantae
- Clade: Tracheophytes
- Clade: Angiosperms
- Clade: Monocots
- Clade: Commelinids
- Order: Poales
- Family: Poaceae
- Subfamily: Chloridoideae
- Tribe: Cynodonteae
- Subtribe: Scleropogoninae
- Genus: Erioneuron; Nash

Type species
- Erioneuron pilosum (Buckley) Nash

Synonyms
- Trichodiclida Cerv.

= Erioneuron =

Genus of grasses

Erioneuron is a genus of New World plants in the grass family native to southern North America and southern South America. They are sometimes called by the common name woollygrass. These are tufty grasses with hairy spikelets.

Species

- Erioneuron avenaceum (Kunth) Tateoka - shortleaf woollygrass - United States (AZ NM TX), Mexico (from Chihuahua to Oaxaca)
- Erioneuron pilosum (Buckley) Nash - hairy woollygrass - United States (AZ NM TX OK KS CO UT NV CA), Mexico (from Chihuahua to Oaxaca), Argentina, Bolivia

formerly included

- Erioneuron pulchellum - Dasyochloa pulchella
