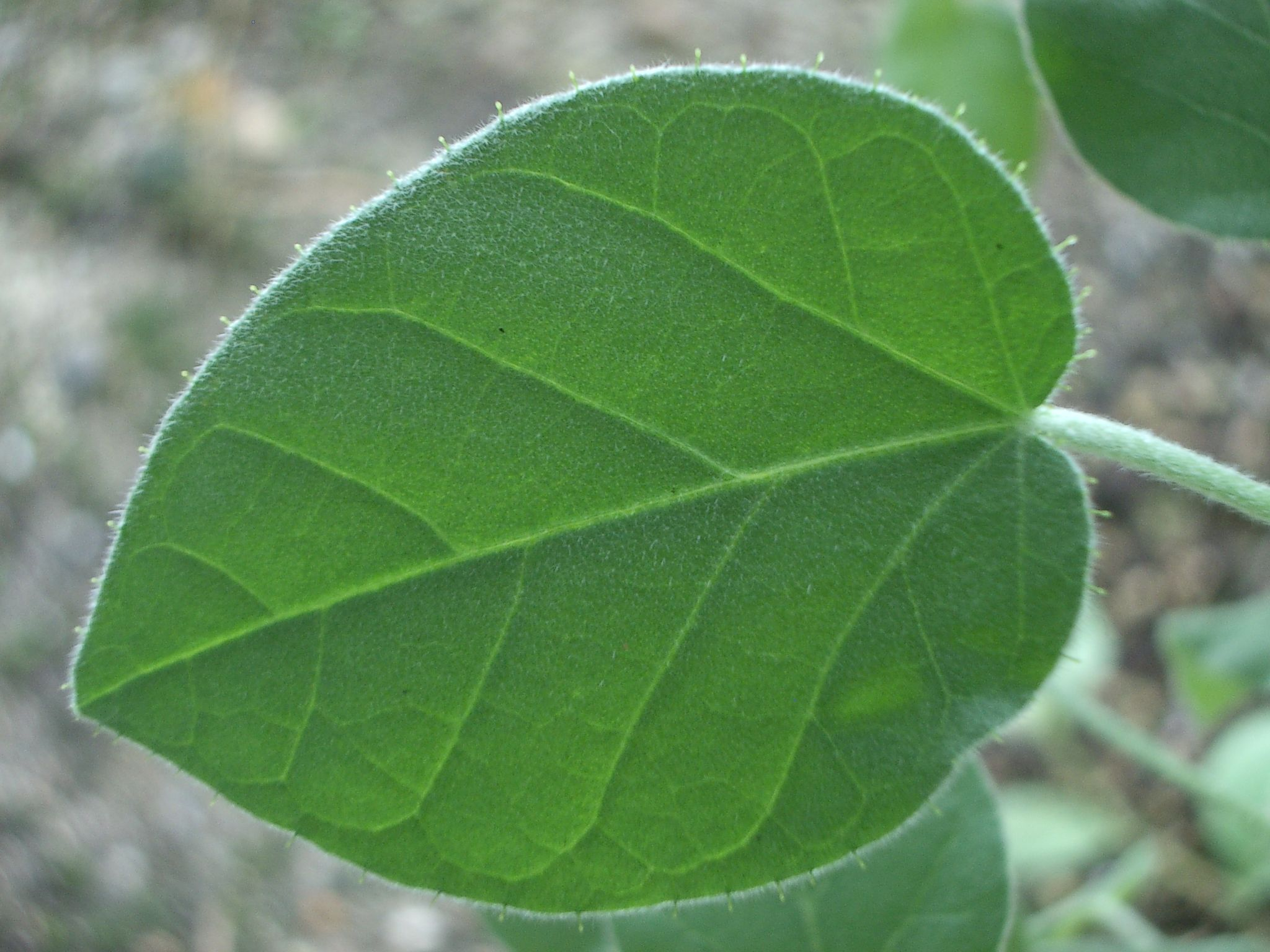

Conservation status
- Secure (NatureServe)

Scientific classification
- Kingdom: Plantae
- Clade: Tracheophytes
- Clade: Angiosperms
- Clade: Eudicots
- Clade: Rosids
- Order: Malpighiales
- Family: Euphorbiaceae
- Genus: Croton
- Species: C. ciliatoglandulifer

Binomial name
- Croton ciliatoglandulifer Ortega, 1797

= Croton ciliatoglandulifer =

Bush croton

Species of plant

Croton ciliatoglandulifer, known as the bush croton or Mexican croton, is a plant species of the genus Croton.
