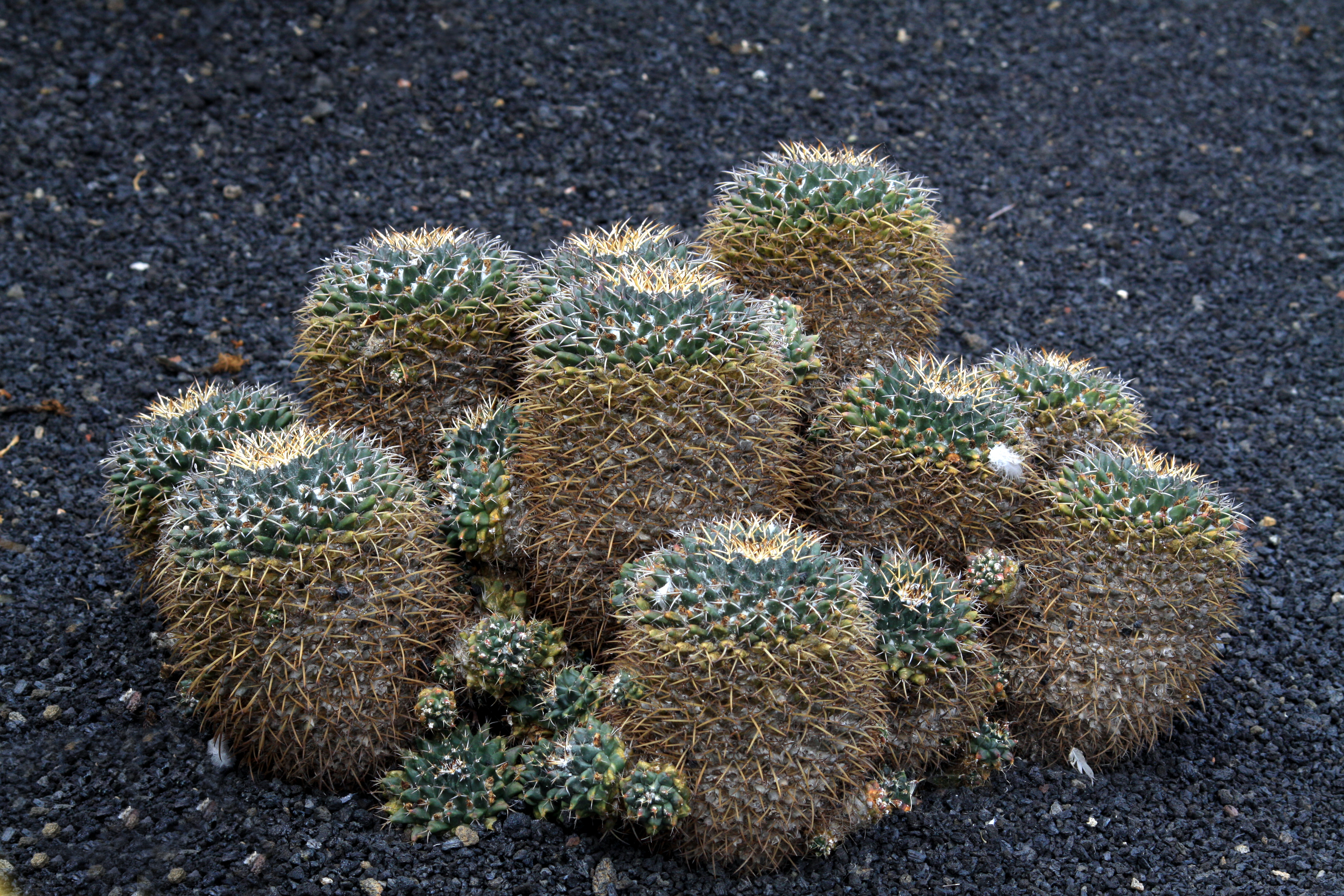
- Mammillaria magnimamma at the Orto Botanico dell'Università di Genova

Conservation status
- Least Concern (IUCN 3.1)

Scientific classification
- Kingdom: Plantae
- Clade: Tracheophytes
- Clade: Angiosperms
- Clade: Eudicots
- Order: Caryophyllales
- Family: Cactaceae
- Subfamily: Cactoideae
- Genus: Mammillaria
- Species: M. magnimamma

Binomial name
- Mammillaria magnimamma Haw.

Synonyms
- Mammillaria macracantha; Mammillaria zuccariniana; Mammillaria centricirrha; Mammillaria bucareliensis; Mammillaria vagaspina; Mammillaria priessnitzii; Mammillaria saxicola; Mammillaria vallensis; Mammillaria rioverdensis

= Mammillaria magnimamma =

Species of cactus

Mammillaria magnimamma, common name Mexican pincushion, is a species of flowering plant in the cactus family Cactaceae.

== Description ==
Mammillaria magnimamma is a perennial globose plant reaching a height of 15–30 cm and a diameter of about 13 cm. At first it grows solitary, but later forms large clumps rising above ground level. Tubercules are four-sided, with latex and the axils have dense white wool. The radial spines are 2 - 5, quite variable and unequal, with dark tips, 15 – 45 mm long. Flowers are pink or white cream with reddish midveins and a diameter of 20 – 25 mm. They bloom in mid Spring. Fruits are club shaped, dark red, about 20 mm long, and contain little brown seeds.

== Distribution ==
This species is widespread throughout central Mexico, at an elevation of 100–2,700 metres (330–8,860 ft) above sea level. Its status is listed as "Least Concern" by the IUCN Red List.

== Cultivation ==
Mammillaria magnimamma can tolerate temperatures down to 1 °C (34 °F), so in temperate zones may be placed outside during the summer months, but in winter requires protection from frost and inclement weather. It needs to be grown in a well-drained medium in full sun. It has gained the Royal Horticultural Society's Award of Garden Merit.

== Gallery ==
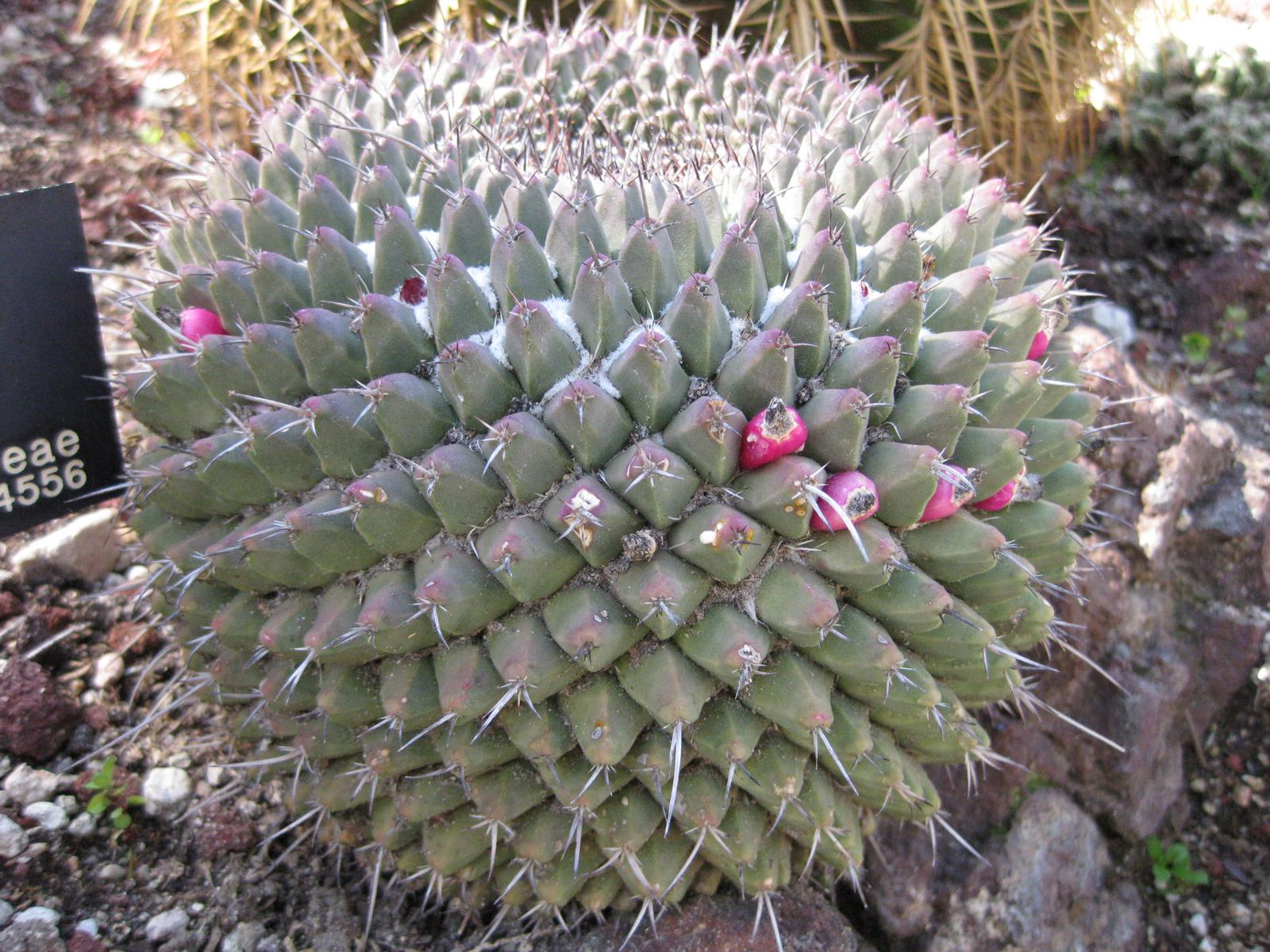
Fruit of Mammillaria magnimamma

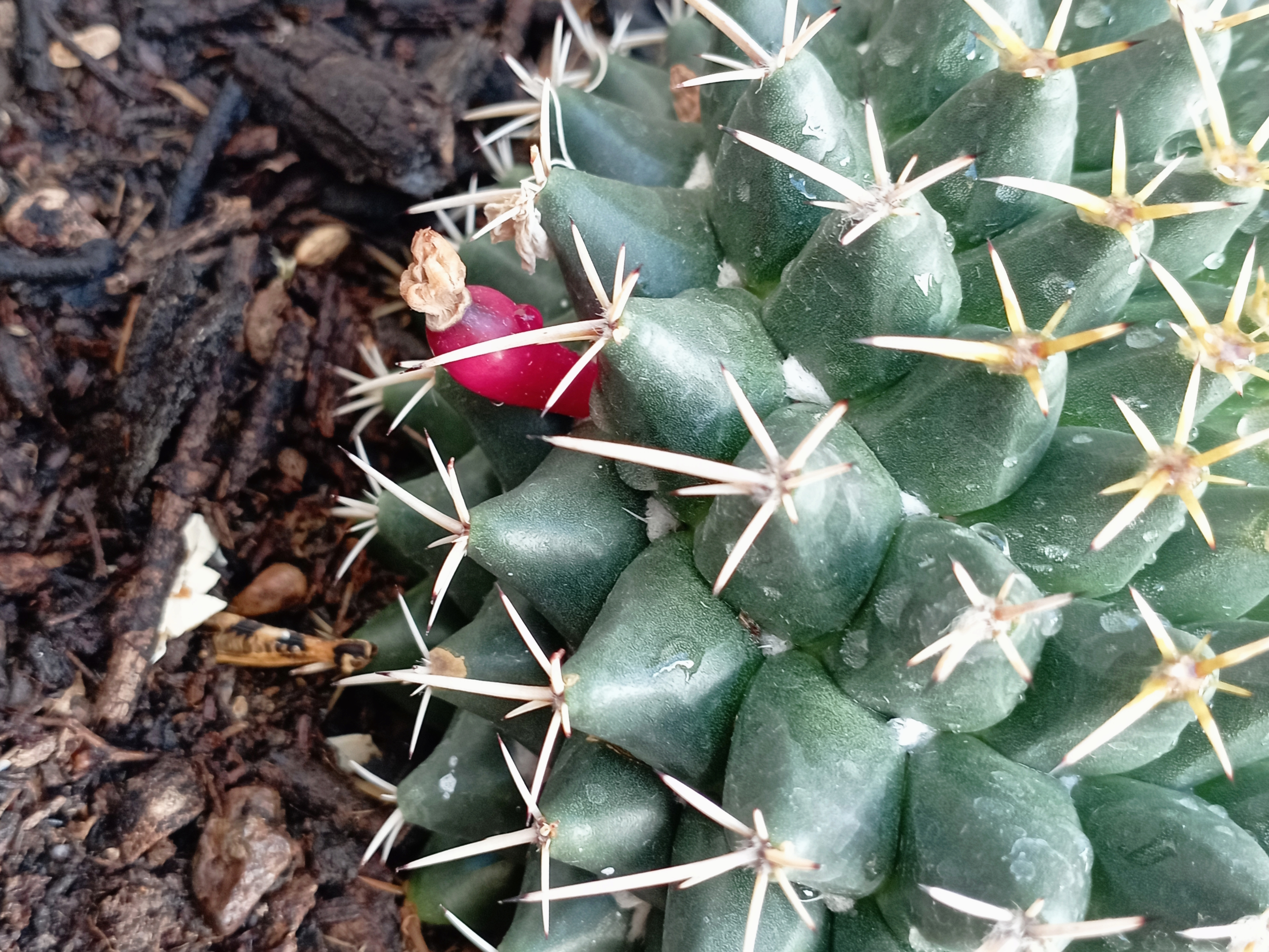
Fruit of Mammillaria magnimamma
