= Platyclade =

Platyclades are flattened, photosynthetic shoots, branches or stems that resemble or perform the function of leaves. Platyclades are seen in plants such as Homalocladium platycladum and some cactus genera like Opuntia and Schlumbergera.

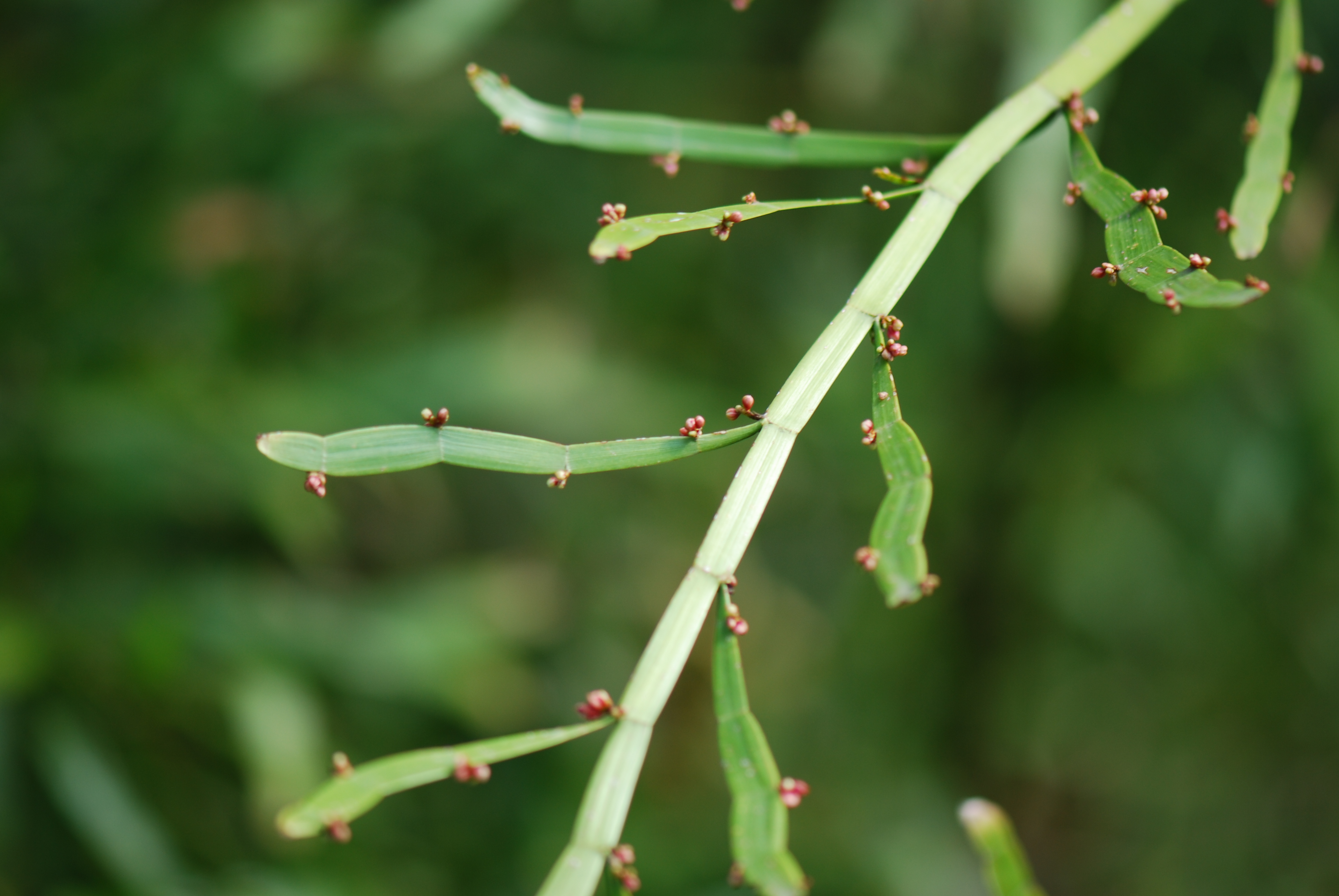

== Etymology ==
Neo-Latin platycladium; from Greek platy, flat + klados, branch.
