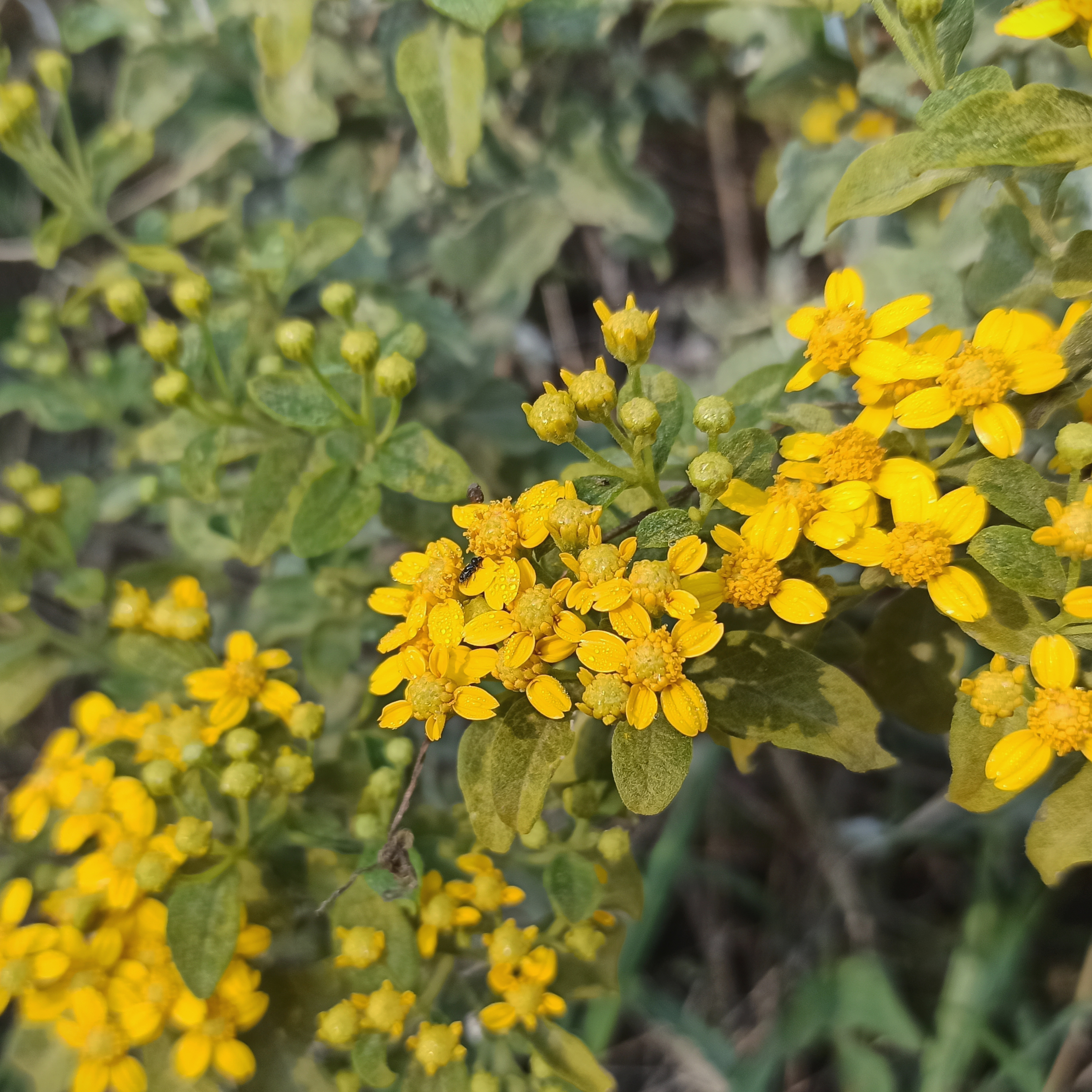
- Zaluzania augusta

Scientific classification
- Kingdom: Plantae
- Clade: Tracheophytes
- Clade: Angiosperms
- Clade: Eudicots
- Clade: Asterids
- Order: Asterales
- Family: Asteraceae
- Subfamily: Asteroideae
- Tribe: Heliantheae
- Subtribe: Zaluzaniinae
- Genus: Zaluzania; Pers.

Type species
- Zaluzania triloba (Ortega) Pers.

Synonyms
- Chrysophania Kunth ex Less.; Ferdinanda Lag.; Aiolotheca DC.

= Zaluzania =

Genus of flowering plants

Zaluzania is a genus of flowering plants in the family Asteraceae.

Species

All the species are native to Mexico; one also crosses the border into the United States.

- Zaluzania asperrima Sch.Bip. - Puebla
- Zaluzania augusta (Lag.) Sch.Bip. - Durango, Hidalgo, Guanajuato
- Zaluzania cinerascens Sch.Bip. - Hidalgo
- Zaluzania delgadoana B.L.Turner - Durango
- Zaluzania discoidea A.Gray - Chihuahua
- Zaluzania ensifolia (Sch.Bip.) Sch.Bip. - Sinaloa
- Zaluzania grayana B.L.Rob. & Greenm. - Chihuahua, Arizona (Cochise Co), New Mexico (Hidalgo Co)
- Zaluzania megacephala Sch.Bip. - Hidalgo, Nuevo León, Querétaro
- Zaluzania mollissima A.Gray - San Luis Potosí, Zacatecas
- Zaluzania montagnifolia (Sch.Bip.) Sch.Bip. - Oaxaca, Puebla, Guerrero
- Zaluzania parthenioides (DC.) Rzed. - Nuevo León
- Zaluzania pringlei Greenm. - Morelos
- Zaluzania subcordata W.M.Sharp - Oaxaca, Puebla
- Zaluzania triloba (Ortega) Pers. - Zacatecas, Tamaulipas, San Luis Potosí, Nuevo León, México State, Hidalgo, Coahuila, Aguascalientes
