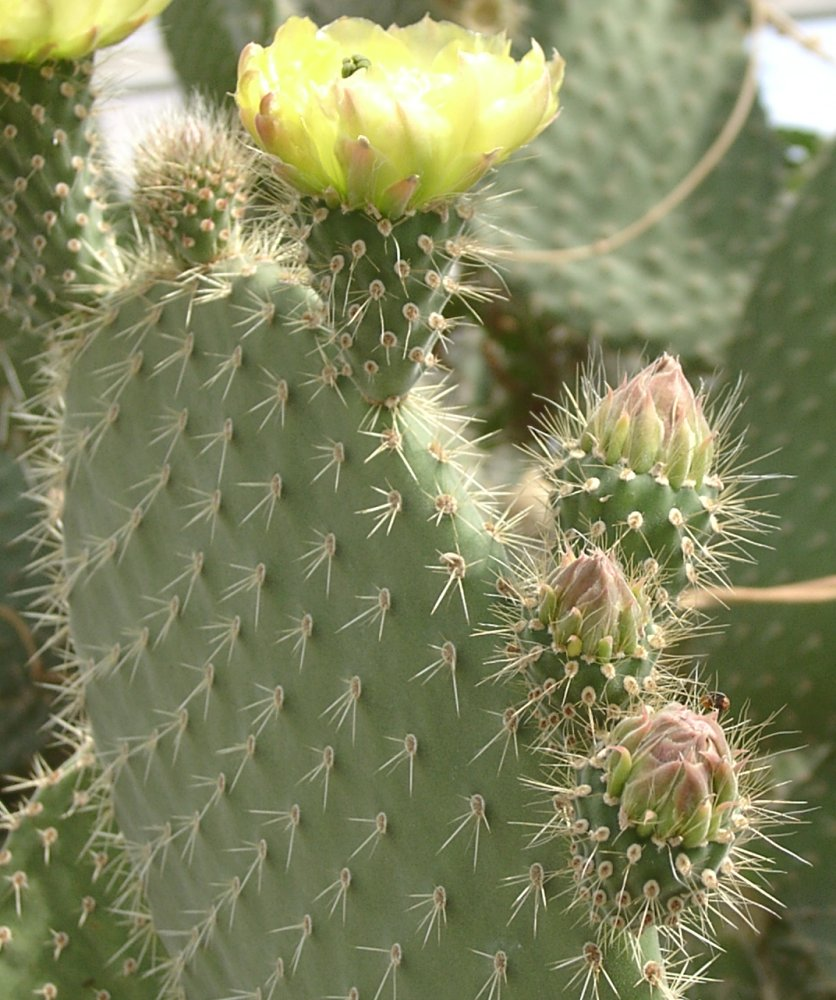

Conservation status
- Least Concern (IUCN 3.1)

Scientific classification
- Kingdom: Plantae
- Clade: Tracheophytes
- Clade: Angiosperms
- Clade: Eudicots
- Order: Caryophyllales
- Family: Cactaceae
- Genus: Opuntia
- Species: O. leucotricha

Binomial name
- Opuntia leucotricha DC.

= Opuntia leucotricha =

Species of cactus

Opuntia leucotricha is a species of cactus with the common names: arborescent pricklypear, Aaron's beard cactus, and semaphore cactus; and (in Spanish) duraznillo blanco and nopal blanco.

== Description ==
Opuntia leucotricha is a tree-like cactus, growing up to 5 metres (16 ft) tall. The platyclades have a thin fuzz of white hairs on their joints.

The plant is an invasive species in Florida.

== Distribution ==
The plant is endemic to Mexico. The cactus occurs in mountain habitats, in the states of: San Luis Potosí, Tamaulipas, Zacatecas, Guanajuato, and Querétaro.
