= Zaluzania augusta =

- Woody-based shrub in fencerow

Scientific classification
- Kingdom: Plantae
- Clade: Tracheophytes
- Clade: Angiosperms
- Clade: Eudicots
- Clade: Asterids
- Order: Asterales
- Family: Asteraceae
- Tribe: Heliantheae
- Genus: Zaluzania
- Species: Z. augusta

Binomial name
- Zaluzania augusta (Lag.) Sch.Bip.

Synonyms
- Ferdinanda augusta Lag.; Zaluzania angusta Benth. & Hook.f.

Species of plant

Flowering head

Flowers in subcorymbose clusters atop shrub

Leaves

Woody base

Zaluzania augusta is a species of flowering plant in the family Asteraceae which is native only to Mexico. It has no common English name, though all Zaluzania species can be called zaluzanias.

== Description ==
Zaluzania augusta is a yellow-flowered shrub growing up to 3 m (9.8 ft) tall. It is similar to numerous other species, but its particular combination of features helps make its identification fairly easy. Here are some of its key distinctive features:

- Its vegetative parts are fragrant when crushed. Younger stems are densely hairy.
- Leaves with short or hardly discernible petioles arise singly from the stems. Blades up to 8 cm (3 in) long and half as wide have blunt, gradually narrowing tips, and rounded to gradually narrowing bases. Margins have no to a few teeth. Both blade surfaces are silvery hairy.
- Floral heads are arranged in loose, somewhat flat-topped to slightly rounded "corymbiform" arrays. These arrays may look like single large inflorescences, but most of the floral heads' peduncles arise from where regular leaves attach to stems inside the arrays; regular inflorescence branches may have tiny bracts, but no leaves at peduncle attachment points.
- Up to 10 "ray florets" at the heads' margins have flat, petal-like, yellow corollas up to 8 mm (3/8 in) long. These radiate from around the heads' "eyes," which consist of up to about 100 "disc florets" with yellow, cylindrical corollas. Both ray and disc florets are fertile and beside each disc floret there is a scale, the "palea." Cypselae of disc florets bear no pappuses but sometimes those of ray florets have a pappus of several small scales. Below each floral head there are 10 to 12 involucral bracts of more or less the same height.
- Mature cypselae are about 2 mm (1/16 in) long and hairless.

== Distribution ==
Zaluzania augusta is endemic only to Mexico, occurring in Mexico City and the states of Aguascalientes, Durango, Guanajuato, Hidalgo, Jalisco, México, Michoacán, Morelos, Nayarit, Querétaro, San Luis Potosí, Tlaxcala, Veracruz and Zacatecas.

== Habitat ==
In the northern Valley of Mexico, Zaluzania augusta is abundant, mainly in dry scrub but also in areas of shrubby oak and juniper forests, at elevations of 2,300–2,950 m (7,550–9,680 ft). Images on this page show an individual inhabiting a weedy fencerow in an area of mesquite and scrub in the state of Querétaro at about 1,900 m (6,200 ft).

== Ecology ==
A study of niche conservatism among Mexico's 11 species of Zaluzania found Zaluzania augusta and one other species to occur in the greatest number of 32 identified physiographic provinces. The distribution of Zaluzania augusta was approximately that of the whole genus, indicating that relative to most other Zaluzania species, Zaluzania augusta was somewhat a generalist in terms of its environmental adaptations. Otherwise the genus is thought of as an example of having species evolving into different, mutually exclusive ecological niches.

Another study lists Zaluzania augusta as contributing nectar and pollen to pollinators for the honey industry; the species flowers from July to December.

== Traditional uses ==
=== As a spine-remover ===
In Mexico a common Spanish name for Zaluzania augusta is limpia tuna, or "tuna cleaner." A tuna is the edible fruit of Opuntia cacti. Broken-off branches of Zaluzania augusta are used as brushes which, when swept across the tuna, remove tiny, spiny glochids often present, whether larger, more firmly attached spines are present or not.

=== In traditional medicine ===
In Mexico infusions of Zaluzania augusta are used for stomach pain, colic, and as an abortifacient.

== Taxonomy ==
In 1816 Mariano Lagasca formally described and named Zaluzania augusta under the basionym Ferdinanda augusta. Later the genus name Ferdinanda was recognized as a synonym for the genus Zaluzania, which had been erected in 1807.

=== Varieties ===
In 2026, two varieties of Zaluzania augusta were recognized:

- Zaluzania augusta var. augusta
- Zaluzania augusta var. rzedowskii

=== Etymology ===
The origin of the genus name Zaluzania was not explained when it was formally described by Christiaan Hendrik Persoon. However, it may have honored the Czech botanist Adam Zalužanský of Zalužany.

The species name augusta derives from the Latin augustus meaning "venerable." Originally it was applied to a Roman emperor, meaning more or less "his majesty." It is worth noting that in 1816 when in Spain Mariano Lagasca formally described and named Ferdinanda augusta, later to be known as Zaluzania augusta, the autocrat king Ferdinand VII was mercilessly persecuting liberal elements who might oppose him. The name Ferdinanda augusta would have been understood to express obeisance to "His Majesty Ferdnand." Still, in 1823, Lagasca had to escape from Spain to England because of his too-liberal political views, in the process losing the best of his herbarium, library and all of his manuscripts.
