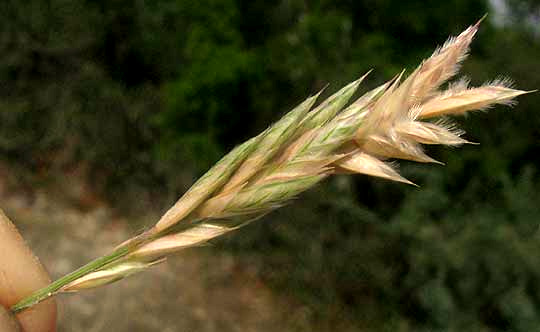
- Inflorescence

Scientific classification
- Kingdom: Plantae
- Clade: Tracheophytes
- Clade: Angiosperms
- Clade: Monocots
- Clade: Commelinids
- Order: Poales
- Family: Poaceae
- Subfamily: Chloridoideae
- Genus: Erioneuron
- Species: E. pilosum

Binomial name
- Erioneuron pilosum (Buckley) Nash

Synonyms
- List: Sieglingia pilosa (Buckley) Nash; Triodia pilosa (Buckley) Merr.; Uralepis pilosa Buckley; Dasyochloa argentina (Kuntze) Caro; Dasyochloa argentina var. aristiglumis Caro; Dasyochloa argentina var. parodiana (E.A.Sánchez) Caro; Dasyochloa kurtziana (Parodi) Caro; Dasyochloa longiglumis (Parodi) Caro; Dasyochloa pygmaea (Parodi) Caro; Erioneuron avenaceum var. kurtzianum (Parodi) Anton; Erioneuron avenaceum var. longearistatum (Kurtz) Beetle; Erioneuron avenaceum var. longiglume (Parodi) Anton; Erioneuron avenaceum var. pygmaeum (Parodi) Anton; Erioneuron pilosum var. argentinum (Kuntze) Nicora; Erioneuron pilosum var. aristiglume (Caro) E.A.Sánchez; Erioneuron pilosum var. longearistatum (Kurtz) Anton; Erioneuron pilosum var. mendocinum (Parodi) Nicora; Erioneuron pilosum var. parodianum E.A.Sánchez; Sieglingia acuminata (Munro ex A.Gray) Kuntze; Sieglingia argentina Kuntze; Tricuspis acuminata Munro ex A.Gray; Tridens avenaceus var. kurtzianus Parodi; Tridens avenaceus var. longiglumis Parodi; Tridens avenaceus var. pygmaeus Parodi; Tridens pilosus var. argentinus (Kuntze) Parodi; Tridens pilosus var. mendocinus Parodi; Triodia acuminata (Munro ex A.Gray) Benth. ex Vasey; Triodia argentina (Kuntze) K.Schum.; Triodia avenacea var. longearistata Kurtz; Triodia avenacea var. pygmaea Hack. ex R.E.Fr.

= Erioneuron pilosum =

Species of plant

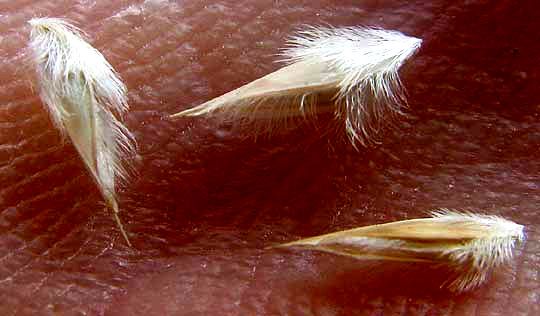
Hairy woollygrass florets

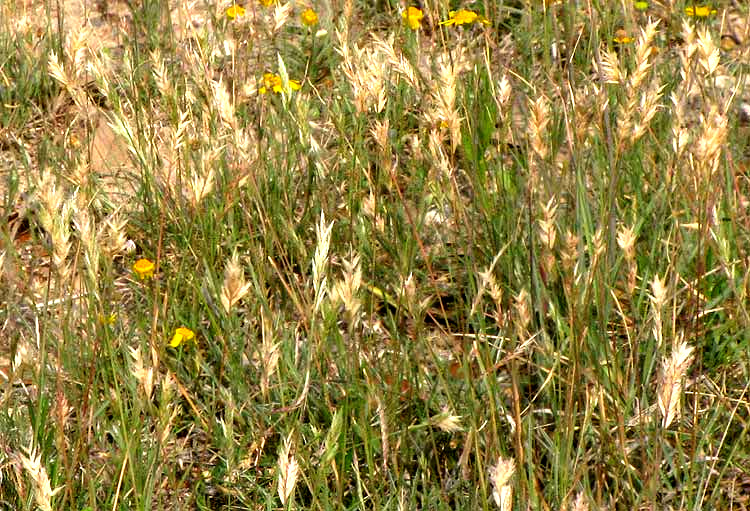
Hairy woollygrass in habitat

Erioneuron pilosum, the hairy woollygrass, hairy erioneuron or hairy tridens, is a short, perennial grass often occurring on overgrazed rangelands in the Americas. Within the familyPoaceae, it belongs to the subfamily Chloridoideae, which mainly occurs in arid tropical and subtropical grasslands.

== Description ==
Erioneuron pilosum is can be distinguished from most other grass species by this combination of features:

- Normally it forms tufts up to 40 cm (16 in) tall, though usually it is shorter. Typically only one stem internode shows above the dense tuft of basal leaves. Sometimes it develops stolons.
- Leaves up to 9 cm (3.5 in) long usually are folded up their middles -- they are conduplicate -- and are much hardened, or "cartilaginous", along their margins. At blade bases there are tufts of hairs up to 2 mm (0.08 in) tall. Atop the leaf base wrapping around the stem, the sheath, there's a ligule composed of a tuft of hairs up to 3.5 mm (0.14 in) high).
- Spikelets up to 15 mm (0.59 in) long and containing up to 20 florets (usually about half that) are arranged in oval, compact panicles or racemes up to 6 cm (2.4 in) long.
- Florets, compressed from the sides, are purplish when immature but become pale possibly with a purplish tinge when mature. When they drop away, they disarticulate above the glumes. Glumes are about equal in size, up to 7 mm (0.28 in) long. A straight awn up to 3 mm (0.12 in) long occurs at the tips of lower lemmas; lemma veins are densely covered with long, soft hairs.

== Distribution ==
Erioneuron pilosum displays a conspicuously disjunct distribution. In North America it occurs in the United States' southwestern states from southern California to central Texas, and south to southern Mexico. In South America, it is found from Bolivia south into Argentina.

== Habitat ==
In the USA, Erioneuron pilosum lives on well-drained soils atop limestone, sand, caliche in open rangelands including overgrazed ones, in pastures, and where the soil generally is poor in nutrients. In California, it is described as inhabiting rocky slopes, ridges and pinyon-juniper woodlands at an elevation of 1,280–2,000 metres (4,200–6,560 ft). In Argentina it is found on rocky soils, in mountains, notably in Lihué Calel National Park, which is known for its tussock grasses. Also in Argentina, Erioneuron pilosum has been noted as an indicator species for calcareous soils.

== Ecology ==
Erioneuron pilosum is a host for caterpillars of the Uncas skipper, Hesperia uncas.

Seed-eating birds feed on the species' grains, and small mammals use it for nesting material. Deer avoid it as a food.

== Human interactions ==
=== In gardens ===
Erioneuron pilosum is described as a tufted perennial with a "lovely fluffy inflorescence" that looks good in short grass prairie gardens, where it grows to about 30 cm tall (1 foot). A nursery selling the species further states that it can provide a good matrix in which to establish wildflowers, for example combining it with the wildflowers Winecup, Prairie Verbena, Four-nerve Daisy, Blanketflower and Missouri Primrose. Among these wildflowers it contributes an interesting contrast with its texture.

=== On rangelands ===
Erioneuron pilosum is one of the shortest and least productive grasses in terms of providing forage for livestock, though sheep and goats with their small mouths feed on it to a limited extent. It provides minimal protection to soil from erosion.

== Taxonomy ==
In 1862, Erioneuron pilosum, under the basionym Uralepis pilosa, was first described by Samuel Botsford Buckley.

Older literature sometimes mention varieties of Erioneuron pilosum, but currently the three varieties listed in the 1997 revision of the genus are listed among the taxon's 30 synonyms.

The formal description of the genus Erioneuron by Nash in 1903 was based on Erioneuron pilosum.

=== Etymology ===
The genus name Erioneuron derives from the Greek erion, meaning "wool", and neuron, meaning "nerve". Thus "hairy-nerved", describing well the long-haired florets of the genus's species.

The species name pilosum derives from the Latin pilus, meaning "hair". The -um is added to decline the word's adjective neuter form, resulting in the meaning "hairy". This undoubtedly refers to the species' hairy lemmas and other parts.
