= Croton fruticulosus =

- Plant on slope of limestone hill

Conservation status
- Secure (NatureServe)

Scientific classification
- Kingdom: Plantae
- Clade: Tracheophytes
- Clade: Angiosperms
- Clade: Eudicots
- Clade: Rosids
- Order: Malpighiales
- Family: Euphorbiaceae
- Genus: Croton
- Species: C. fruticulosus

Binomial name
- Croton fruticulosus Torr.

Synonyms
- Oxydectes fruticulosa (Torr.) Kuntze; Croton fruticulosus var. fuscencens Müll.Arg.; Croton fruticulosus var pallescens Müll.Arg.

Species of plant

Female flower beside young flower buds

Stellate hairs on lower leaf surface

Croton fruticulosus, the bush croton, is a species of shrub or subshrub mainly growing in dry scrub. Occurring in the southwestern United States and northern Mexico, it belongs to the family Euphorbiaceae.

== Description ==
Here are key identification features of Croton fruticulosus:

- Stems are much branched, semi-woody or woody, and up to 1 m (3 ft 3 in) tall.
- Fragrant leaves with petioles up to 1.5 cm (5/8 in) long arise singly. Blades up to about 8 cm × 4 cm (3 1/4 in × 1 1/2 in) are broadest below their middles and diminish toward sharp tips; their upper surfaces, which are darker green than the lower, are covered fine, soft, short hairs while lower surfaces bear branched or "stellate" hairs. Margins have tiny teeth and often are slightly wavy.
- Raceme-type inflorescences up to 12 cm (4 3/4 in) long contain up to 20 male flowers, and up to 5 female flowers, so the plants are monoecious. The unisexual flowers have no petals, but do possess 5 conspicuously stellate-hairy sepals. Ovaries of female flowers bear 3 styles, each deeply divided to the base, resulting in 6 terminal segments.
- Capsular-type fruits are up to 6 mm (1/4 in) in diameter, smooth, and usually produce four or five shiny seeds.

== Distribution ==
In the USA, Croton fruticulosus occurs only from southeastern Arizona through southern New Mexico, into Texas as far east as the Edwards Plateau. In northern Mexico, it is native to the states of Chihuahua, Coahuila, Durango, Hidalgo, Nuevo León, Querétaro, San Luis Potosí, and Tamaulipas.

== Habitat ==
In the USA, Croton fruticulosus occurs on limestone or basalt hills at elevations from 100 to 1,700 m (330 to 5,580 ft). In northeastern Mexico's Cumbres de Monterrey National Park it occurs in oak forests.

== Ecology ==
Croton fruticulosus is visited by butterflies, bees and other nectar-feeding insects during its spring flowering period. Its seeds provides food for birds and small wildlife. In Texas it is a host plant of the Gulf Fritillary, Zebra Longwing and Julia butterflies.

Croton fruticulosus has been shown to be a pioneer species in areas where vegetation has been burned; it readily sprouts from the base, indicating a high tolerance for stress.

== Uses by humans ==
=== In gardening ===
Croton fruticulosus is suggested as a good shrub for shady spots, with fragrant foliage and a bright yellow fall color. It forms a neat, rounded shrub with silvery-green leaves. Once established it requires minimal watering, and maintains a tidy appearance throughout its growing season.

=== In traditional medicine ===
In Mexico's Chihuahua state the root of Croton fruticulosus has been used to treat gum diseases, and the leaves and fruits have been employed as a purgative.

=== As tea and spice ===
Croton fruticulosus can be used for tea or spice, but may be difficult to distinguish from other Croton species, some of which are skin irritants and may be toxic.

== Taxonomy ==
Croton fruticulosus is one of many species first scientifically documented as a result of the United States and Mexican Boundary Survey that took place from 1848 to 1855. In 1859 when John Torrey formally described and named Croton fruticulosus under the similar basionym Croton fruticulosum, he appended the shorthand Englem. MSS. In this way he referenced a work by the botanist George Engelmann. Sometimes the author of Croton fruticulosus is given as "Engelmann ex Torrey." Engelmann earlier had described the taxon using the name Croton fruticulosum. Apparently Torrey changed the species name from Engelmann's fruticulosum to fruticulosus in order to match the Latin masculine gender of the genus Croton.

=== Etymology ===
The genus name Croton derives from the Greek kroton, meaning "tick," because the seeds vaguely look like ticks.

The species name fruticulosa is based on the Latin fruticulosus, meaning "somewhat shrubby," which this bush is.
