= Ciénegas del Lerma =

Protected area in central Mexico

- Ciénegas del Lerma Flora and Fauna Protection Area
- IUCN category VI (protected area with sustainable use of natural resources)
- Location within Mexico
- Location: México, Mexico
- Nearest city: Toluca, México
- Coordinates: 19°13′N 99°30′W
- Area: 30.24 ha (74.7 acres)
- Designated: 2002
- Administrator: National Commission of Natural Protected Areas

Ramsar Wetland
- Official name: Ciénegas de Lerma
- Designated: 2 February 2004
- Reference no.: 1934

The Ciénegas del Lerma is a wetland in central Mexico. It consists of three lakes in the Toluca Valley, the upper basin of the Lerma River, near the city of Toluca. The wetlands cover 3,023 hectares.

The three lakes are the what remains of a much larger wetland, which covered 27,000 ha at the end of the 19th century.

The wetlands include open-water lakes more than 5 meters deep, marshes with floating and bottom-rooted vegetation, and riparian forests. The lakes are home to many aquatic animals and plants, including endemic and threatened species. The wetlands are an important stopover for migratory waterbirds.

== Flora and fauna ==
According to the National Biodiversity Information System of Comisión Nacional para el Conocimiento y Uso de la Biodiversidad (CONABIO) in Ciénegas del Lerma Flora and Fauna Protection Area there are over 425 plant and animal species from which 31 are in at risk category and 26 are exotics.
