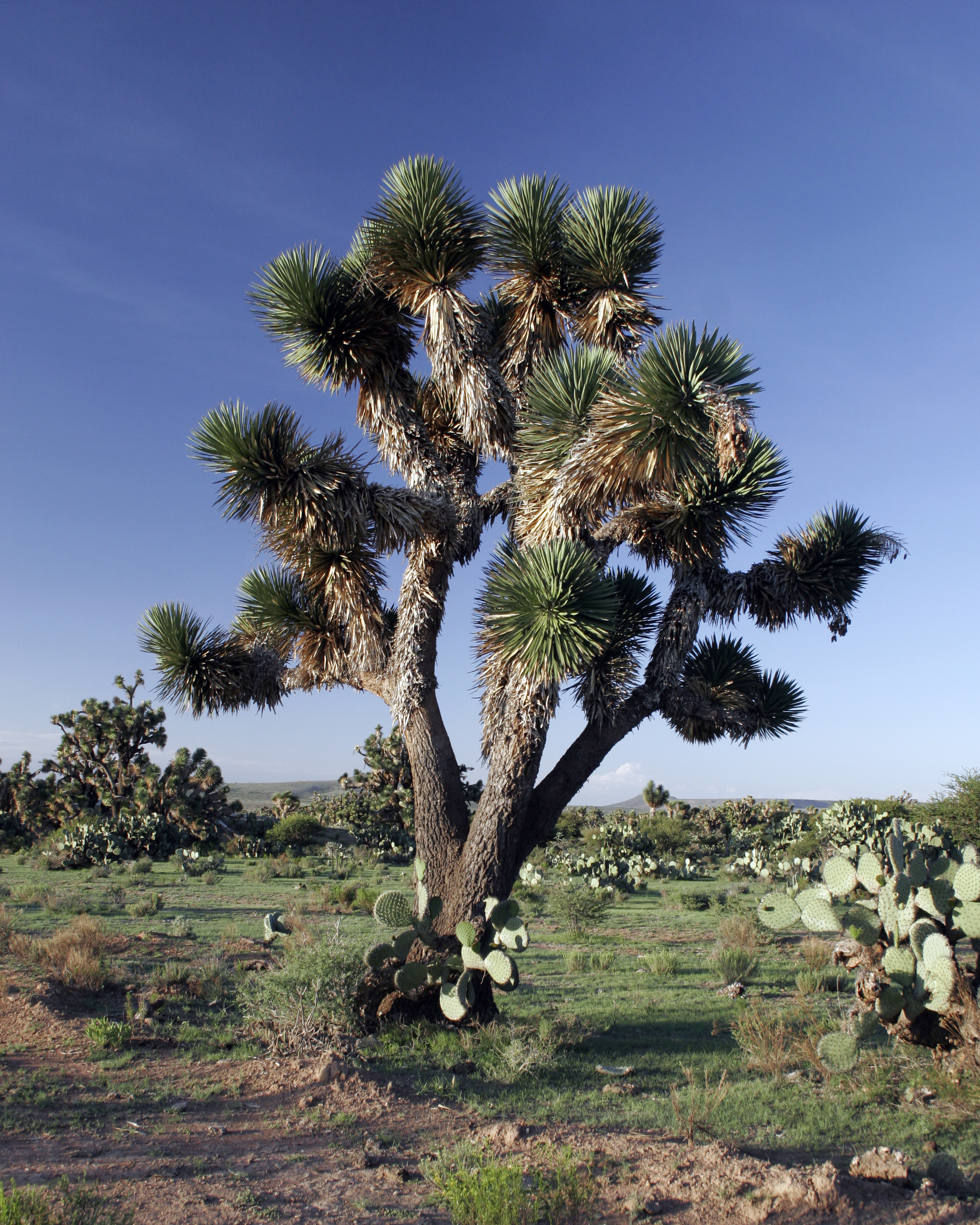

Conservation status
- Least Concern (IUCN 3.1)

Scientific classification
- Kingdom: Plantae
- Clade: Tracheophytes
- Clade: Angiosperms
- Clade: Monocots
- Order: Asparagales
- Family: Asparagaceae
- Subfamily: Agavoideae
- Genus: Yucca
- Species: Y. decipiens

Binomial name
- Yucca decipiens Trel.

Synonyms
- Sarcoyucca decipiens (Trel.) Lindinger

= Yucca decipiens =

Species of flowering plant

Yucca decipiens Trel. is a large, branching member of the Asparagaceae, native to north-central Mexico from Durango to San Luís Potosí. It is evergreen, up to 20 feet (6 m) tall, growing at elevations of 1500–2000 m in the mountains. Common name is "palma china," which means "Chinese palm."

Yucca decipiens is relatively abundant, and although it has local threats, its population appears to be stable overall.
