= Bajío dry forests =

Tropical dry broadleaf forest ecoregion in Mexico

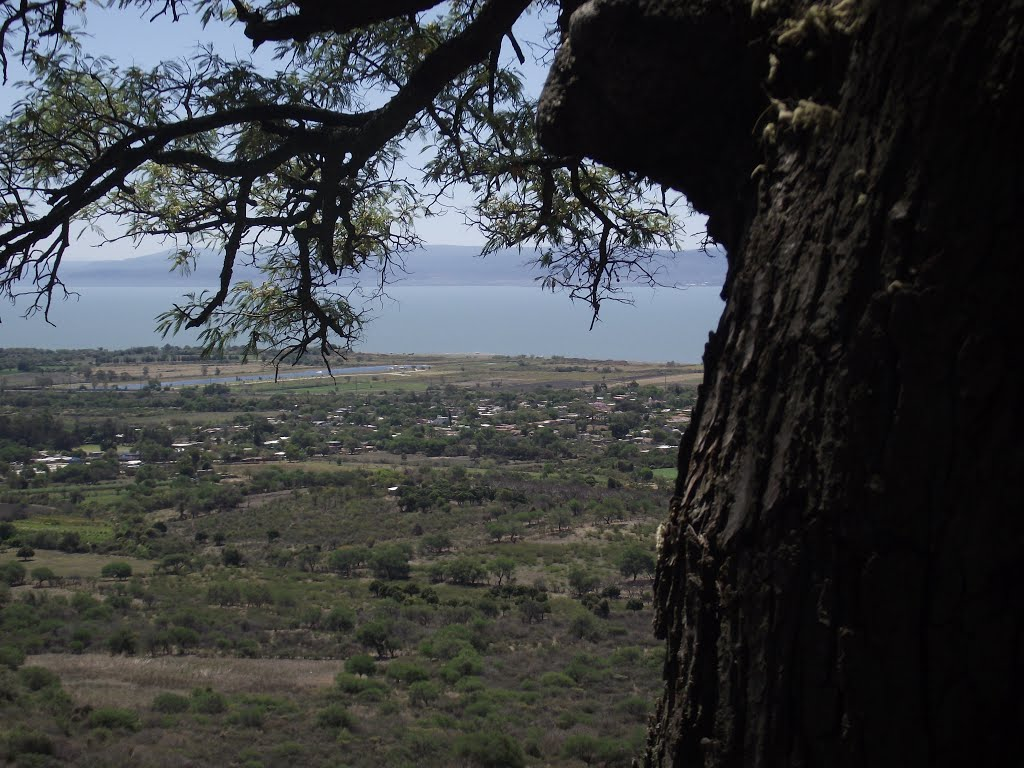
- Lake Chapala, Jalisco, Mexico

- location of the Bajio dry forests ecoregion in western−central Mexico.

Ecology
- Realm: Neotropical
- Biome: tropical and subtropical dry broadleaf forests
- Borders: List: Central Mexican matorral; Jalisco dry forests; Sierra Madre Occidental pine-oak forests; Sinaloan dry forests; Trans-Mexican Volcanic Belt pine-oak forests

Geography
- Area: 37,384 km^{2} (14,434 sq mi)
- Country: Mexico
- States: Jalisco; Guanajuato, Michoacan

Conservation
- Conservation status: Critical/endangered
- Global 200: Mexican dry forests
- Protected: 7.52%

The Bajío dry forests is a tropical dry broadleaf forest ecoregion in western−central Mexico.

== Geography ==
The Bajío dry forests lie in the southwestern portion of the Mexican Plateau. They are bounded on the southeast, south, and southwest by the Trans-Mexican Volcanic Belt pine-oak forests, which occupy the folded mountains and volcanoes of the Trans-Mexican Volcanic Belt that form the southern edge of the Mexican Plateau. The Sierra Madre Occidental pine-oak forests of the Sierra Madre Occidental bound the ecoregion on the northwest.

The numerous mountains of the plateau which rise above the dry forests are occupied by sky islands of pine-oak forest. To the north, the Bajío dry forests transition to the drier, more temperate Central Mexican matorral. Most of the ecoregion lies within the basin of the Lerma River, and the dry forests extend around Lake Chapala at the eastern end of the region, and into the endorheic basins of Lake Cuitzeo and Lake Pátzcuaro in the south.

The cities of Guadalajara, Morelia, and Querétaro lie within the ecoregion.

== Fauna ==
Native mammals include Mexican wolf (Canus lupus baileyi) and pocketed free-tailed bat (Nyctinomops femorosaccus). Birds include the black-throated magpie-jay (Calocitta colliei), thick-billed kingbird (Tyrannus crassirostris), whiskered screech owl (Otus trichopsus), orange-fronted parakeet (Aratinga caniculanis), dwarf vireo (Vireo nelsoni), and black-polled yellowthroat (Geothlypis speciosa).

== Development ==
The ecoregion is densely populated, and centuries of human use have reduced the dry forests to small pockets. Dry deciduous forest used to be the dominant vegetation, but thorn scrub and subtropical matorral are now more common, interspersed with agricultural and pasture lands.

== Protected areas ==
7.52% of the ecoregion is in protected areas. Protected areas include Cerro de Las Campanas National Park, El Cimatario National Park, Lago de Camécuaro National Park, La Primavera Flora and Fauna Protection Area, Siete Luminarias Natural Monument, and Sierra del Águila Protected Area.

== See also ==
- List of ecoregions in Mexico
