= Casimiro Gómez Ortega =

Spanish physician and botanist

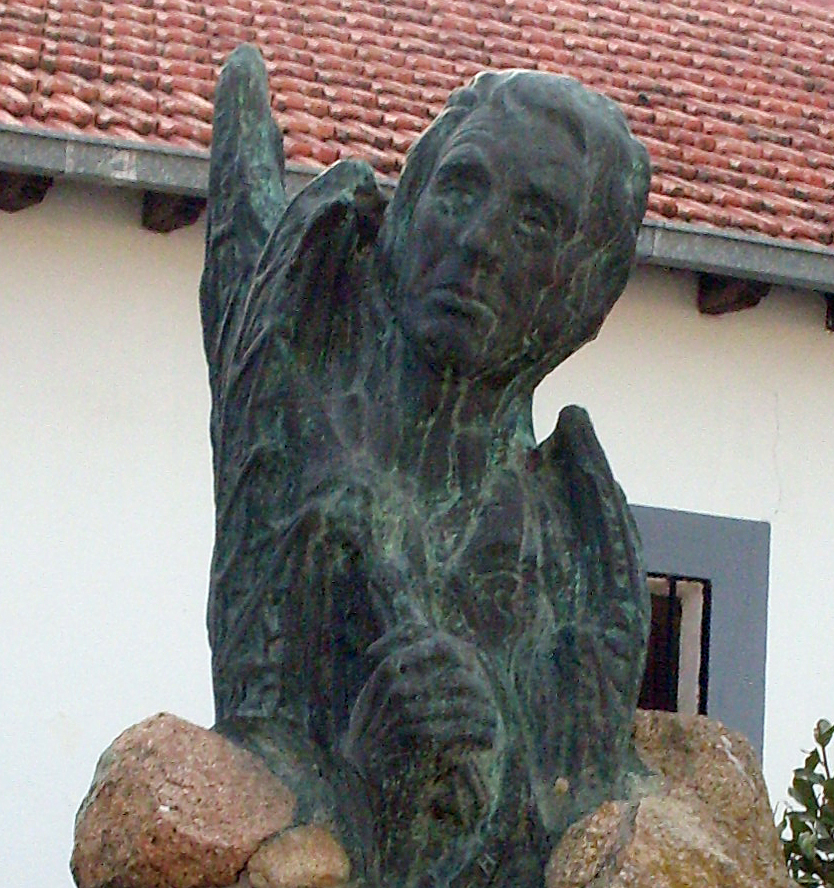
Casimiro Gómez Ortega

Casimiro Gómez de Ortega (4 March 1741, in Añover de Tajo, Spain – 30 August 1818, in Madrid, Spain) was a Spanish physician, and botanist who was the First Professor of the Royal Botanical Garden of Madrid. Under Charles III of Spain Gómez de Ortega directed the formation of the Royal Botanical Garden as a place, in particular, to collect and study the new species of plants being identified by European explorers. Gómez de Ortega published extensively on plant species, and on the economic botany of plants collected during Spanish sponsored explorations of South America.

He described the genera Echeandia (Anthericaceae), Maurandya (Plantaginaceae), Pascalia (Asteraceae), and Sesamoides (Resedaceae).

The genus Gomortega, a tree endemic to Chile, is named after him.

He was elected Fellow of the Royal Society in 1777.
