= Mexican Plateau =

Mexican Plateau Altiplanicie mexicana Mesa Central
- Region
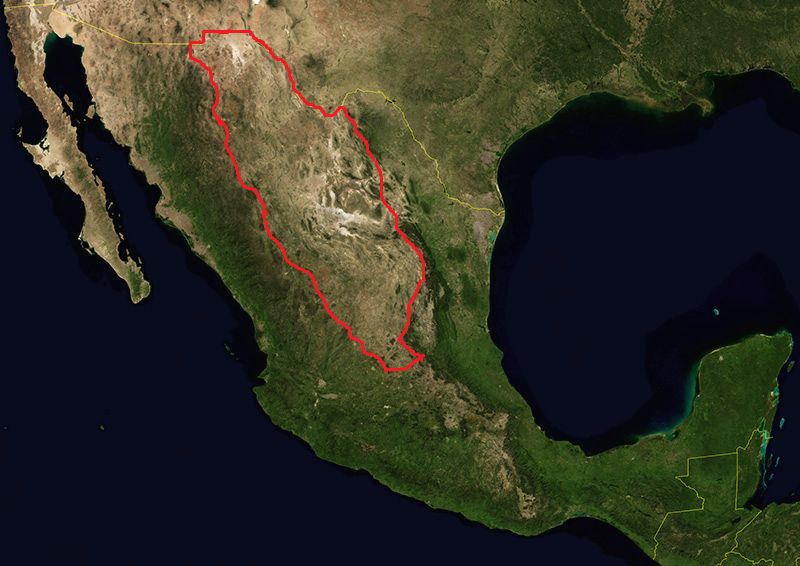
- Rough location of the Mexican Plateau
- Coordinates: 24°N 103°W
- Country: Mexico
- States: Aguascalientes, Chihuahua, Coahuila, Durango, Guanajuato, Jalisco, Michoacán, Querétaro, San Luis Potosí, Zacatecas

Area
  - Total: 601,882 km^{2} (232,388 sq mi)

Population (2000)
  - Total: 74,900,000
  - Density: 124/km^{2} (322/sq mi)

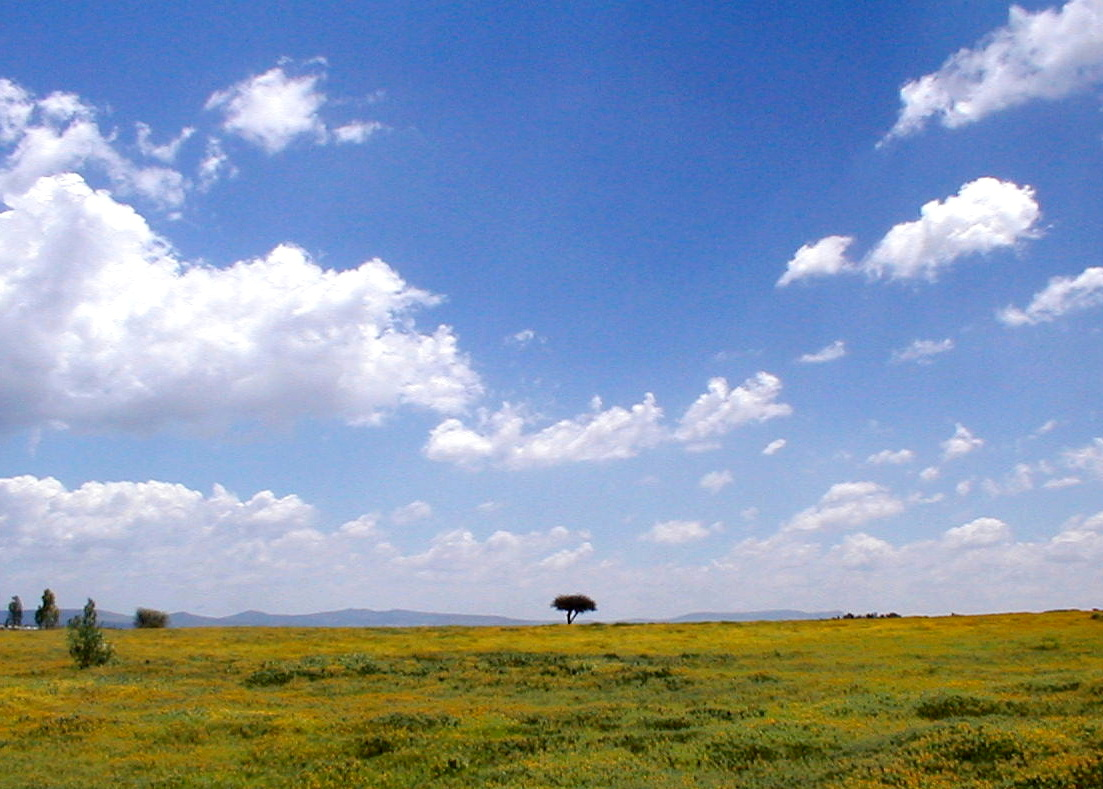
A view of the Mexican Plateau near San Miguel de Allende, Guanajuato

The Central Mexican Plateau, also known as the Mexican Altiplano (Spanish: Altiplano mexicano), is a large arid-to-semiarid plateau occupying much of northern and central Mexico. Averaging 1,825 m (5,988 ft) above sea level, it extends from the United States border in the north to the Trans-Mexican Volcanic Belt in the south, and is bounded by the Sierra Madre Occidental and Sierra Madre Oriental to the west and east, respectively.

A low east–west mountain range in the state of Zacatecas divides the plateau into northern and southern sections. These two sections, called the Northern Plateau (Mesa del Norte) and Central Plateau (Mesa Central), are now generally regarded by geographers as sections of one plateau.

The Mexican Plateau is mostly covered by deserts and xeric shrublands, with pine-oak forests covering the surrounding mountain ranges and forming sky islands on some of the interior ranges. The Mexican Altiplano is one of six distinct physiographic sections of the Basin and Range Province, which in turn is part of the Intermontane Plateaus physiographic division.

In phytogeography, the Sonoran Desert is within the Sonoran Floristic Province of the Madrean Region in southwestern North America, part of the Holarctic realm of the northern Western Hemisphere.

While the plateau stretches from north to south, the southern east–west arc of the Central Mexican Plateau from Jalisco to Veracruz states historically as well as today has served as the population nexus of the Mexican nation, it is home to its biggest metro areas of Guadalajara, León, Querétaro, Morelia, Mexico City, Toluca, Cuernavaca, and Puebla.

== Geography ==
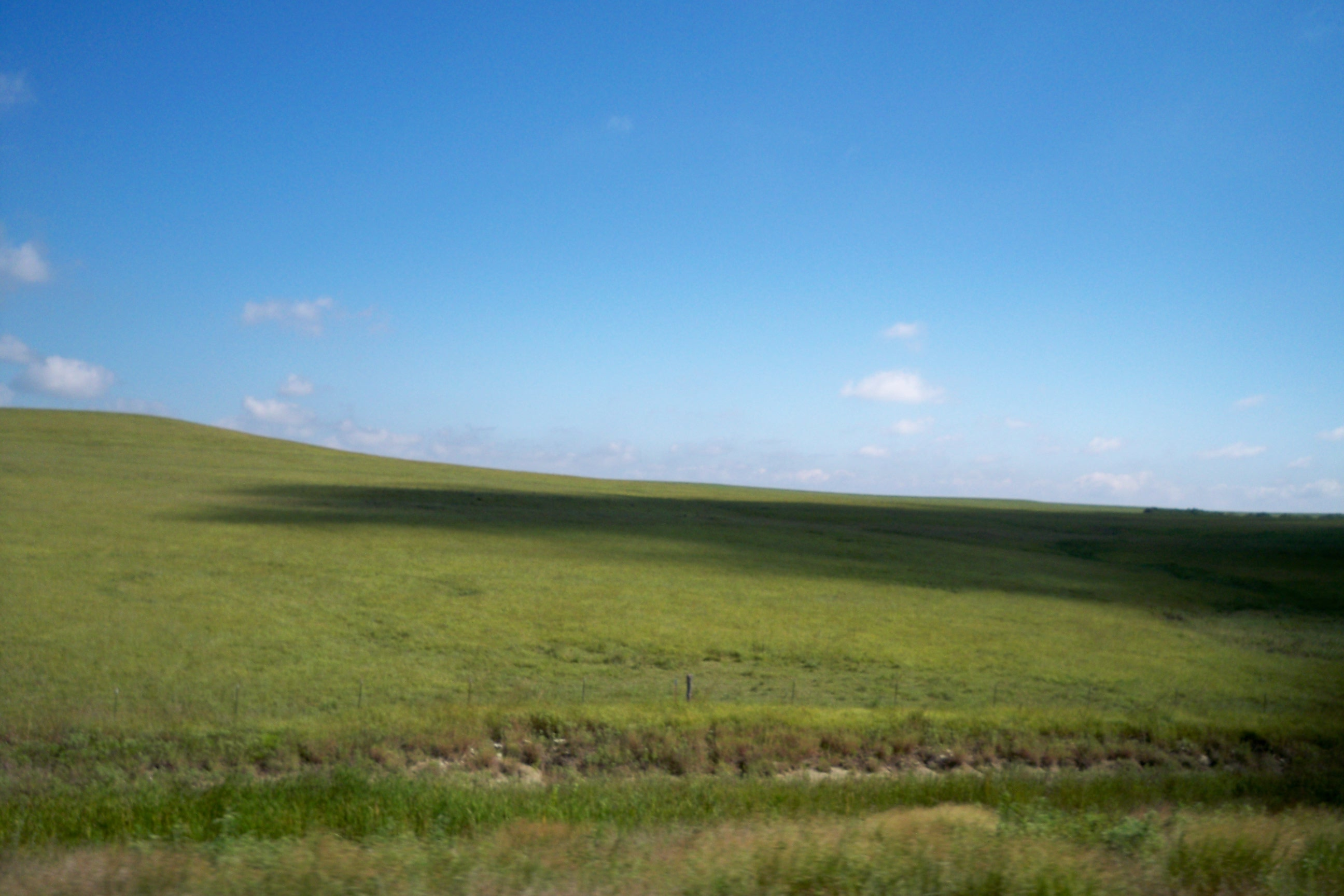
Mesa del Norte is part of the extreme northern part of the Mexican Plateau.

The Mesa del Norte or northern plateau averages 1,100 metres (3,600 ft) in elevation above mean sea level and extends south from the Rio Grande (Río Bravo del Norte) through the states of Chihuahua, Coahuila, Durango, Zacatecas and San Luis Potosí. Various narrow, isolated ridges cross the Mesa del Norte and numerous depressions also dot the region, the largest of which is the Bolsón de Mapimí. The Río Bravo del Norte and its tributary, the Río Conchos, drain portions of the northern plateau, and the Río Pánuco and its tributaries drain the southeastern corner. Both drain to the Gulf of Mexico. Much of the northern plateau comprises internal drainage basins that do not drain to the sea. The Chihuahuan Desert extends across the northern portion of the northern plateau, while the Meseta Central matorral covers the central portion, and the Central Mexican matorral extends from the southern portion of the northern plateau across the southern plateau.

The Mesa Central or southern plateau is higher than its northern counterpart, averaging 2,000 m (6,600 ft) in elevation. The southern plateau contains numerous valleys originally formed by ancient lakes. It extends across the states of Aguascalientes, Jalisco, Zacatecas, Guanajuato, Querétaro, and Michoacán. Several of Mexico's most prominent cities, including Guadalajara, are located in the valleys of the southern plateau. Much of the southern plateau is drained by the Río Grande de Santiago and its tributaries, including the Río Lerma, which drain west into the Pacific Ocean. Tributaries of the Río Pánuco drain the eastern portion of the southern plateau. The Central Mexican matorral covers much of the southern plateau, with the subtropical Bajío dry forests occupying the lower portions of the Lerma–Río Grande de Santiago basin. Higher altitudes are covered by pine–oak woodlands, with oak woodlands and forests at lower elevations, and mixed pine–oak and conifer forests up to the tree line of the volcanoes that surround the southern and western edges.

== See also ==
- Altiplano
