= Campo Verde Flora and Fauna Protection Area =

Protected area in northern Mexico

- Área de Protección de Flora y Fauna Campo Verde
- IUCN category VI (protected area with sustainable use of natural resources)
- Location within Mexico
- Location: Chihuahua, Mexico
- Coordinates: 29°55′16.2″N 108°33′44.3″W
- Area: 108,067 ha (417.25 sq mi)
- Designation: Flora and fauna protection area
- Designated: 2003
- Administrator: National Commission of Natural Protected Areas

Campo Verde Flora and Fauna Protection Area is a protected area in northern Mexico. It covers an area of 1080.67 km^{2} in northwestern Chihuahua, on the border with Sinaloa. It is at the eastern edge of the Sierra Madre Occidental, where it meets the Chihuahuan Desert.

== Flora and fauna ==
According to the National Biodiversity Information System of Comisión Nacional para el Conocimiento y Uso de la Biodiversidad (CONABIO) in Campo Verde Flora and Fauna Protection Area there are over 255 plant and animal species from which 32 are in at risk category and 4 are exotics.

The main plant community is oak and pine–oak woodland. Palo Blanco (Quercus laeta) is a characteristic oak species.

Native mammals include American black bear (Ursus americanus), white-tailed deer (Odocoileus virginianus), puma (Puma concolor), Mexican big-eared bat (Corynorhinus mexicanus), Zacatecan deer mouse (Peromyscus difficilis), and Chihuahuan mouse (Peromyscus polius).

Native birds include the Gould's wild turkey (Meleagris gallopavo mexicanus), golden eagle (Aquila chrysaetos) eared quetzal (Euptilotis neoxenus), thick-billed parrot (Rhynchopsitta pachyrhyncha), Aztec thrush (Ridgwayia pinicola), and Bewick's wren (Thryomanes bewickii).

Native reptiles include the Mexican Plateau horned lizard (Phrynosoma orbiculare), northern pigmy skink (Plestiodon parviauriculatus), Chihuahuan skink (Plestiodon multilineatus), Mexican wandering garter snake (Thamnophis errans), and blackbelly garter snake (Thamnophis melanogaster).

Native amphibians include the Tarahumara salamander (Ambystoma rosaceum), Mexican tiger salamander (Ambystoma velasci), Lemos-Espinal's leopard frog (Lithobates lemosespinali), Tarahumara frog (Lithobates tarahumarae), pine toad (Incilius occidentalis), plateau toad (Anaxyrus compactilis), and Mexican Madre toad (Anaxyrus mexicanus),

== Conservation ==
The area was decreed a forest reserve and wildlife refuge by President Lázaro Cárdenas in 1938. It was re-designated a flora and fauna protection area in 2003.
