= Enrique Márquez =

Enrique Márquez may refer to:

- Enrique Márquez Climent (born 1989), Spanish footballer nicknamed "Kike"
- Enrique Márquez Jaramillo (born 1950), Mexican poet, historian, and politician
- Enrique Marquez Jr., American convert to Islam investigated after the 2015 San Bernardino attack
- Enrique Márquez Pérez, Venezuelan politician, 2024 candidate for president
- Enrique Macaya Márquez (born 1934), Argentine sports journalist

== See also ==
- Henrique Marques (disambiguation)
