= Sierra La Mojonera Flora and Fauna Protection Area =

Protected area in Mexico

- IUCN category VI (protected area with sustainable use of natural resources)
- Location: San Luis Potosí, Mexico
- Area: 92.02 km^{2} (35.53 sq mi)
- Designation: Flora and fauna protection area
- Designated: 2000
- Governing body: National Commission of Natural Protected Areas

Sierra La Mojonera Flora and Fauna Protection Area is a protected natural area of northeastern Mexico. It covers a portion of the Sierra La Mojonera range, a western outlier of the Sierra Madre Oriental, in northern San Luis Potosí. The protected area was established in 2000, and covers an area of 92.02 km^{2} (35.53 mi^{2}).

== Flora and fauna ==
According to the National Biodiversity Information System of Comisión Nacional para el Conocimiento y Uso de la Biodiversidad (CONABIO) in Sierra La Mojonera Flora and Fauna Protection Area there are over 30 plant and animal species, of which 1 is exotic.
