= Flora and fauna protection areas of Mexico =

Mexican Flora and Fauna Protection Areas (Áreas de Protección de Flora y Fauna in Spanish) comprise 226 protected natural areas of Mexico administrated by the National Commission of Protected Natural Areas (Comisión Nacional de Áreas Naturales Protegidas, or CONANP), an agency of the federal government.

They are areas established to conform to the regulations provided by the LGEEPA and other applicable laws on places that contain habitats for which their existence depends on their preservation, transformation, and support of the species of flora and fauna.

== List of Mexican Flora and Fauna Protection Areas ==
=== Baja California ===
- Valle de los Cirios
- Islas del Golfo de California (Islands of the Gulf of California) (also in Baja California Sur, Sonora, and Sinaloa)

=== Baja California Sur ===
- Balandra
- Cabo San Lucas

=== Campeche ===
- Laguna de Términos

=== Chiapas ===
- Cascada de Agua Azul
- Chan-Kin
- Metzabok
- Nahá

=== Chihuahua ===
- Campo Verde
- Cañón de Santa Elena
- Cerro Mohinora
- Médanos de Samalayuca
- Papigochic
- Tutuaca

=== Coahuila ===
- Cuatrociénegas
- Maderas del Carmen
- Ocampo

=== Colima ===
- El Jabalí

=== Jalisco ===
- La Primavera
- Sierra de Quila

=== Estado de México ===
- Ciénegas del Lerma
- Nevado de Toluca

=== Michoacán ===
- Pico de Tancítaro

=== Morelos ===
- Corredor Biológico Chichinautzin (also in Distrito Federal)

=== Oaxaca ===
- Boquerón de Tonalá

=== Quintana Roo ===
- Bala'an Ka'ax
- Cozumel
- Manglares de Nichupté
- Uaymil
- Yum Balam

=== San Luis Potosí ===
- Sierra La Mojonera
- Sierra de Álvarez

=== Sinaloa ===
- Meseta de Cacaxtla

=== Sonora ===
- Sierra de Álamos-Río Cuchujaqui
- Bavispe

=== Tabasco ===
- Cañón del Usumacinta

=== Tamaulipas ===
- Laguna Madre and Río Bravo Delta
- Sierra de Tamaulipas

=== Veracruz ===
- Sistema Arrecifal Lobos-Tuxpan

=== Yucatán ===
- Otoch Ma´Ax Yetel Kooh (also in Quintana Roo)
