= Sierra de Álvarez Flora and Fauna Protection Area =

Protected area in northeastern Mexico

- IUCN category VI (protected area with sustainable use of natural resources)
- Location: San Luis Potosí, Mexico
- Area: 169.0 km^{2} (65.3 sq mi)
- Designation: Flora and fauna protection area
- Designated: 2000
- Governing body: National Commission of Natural Protected Areas

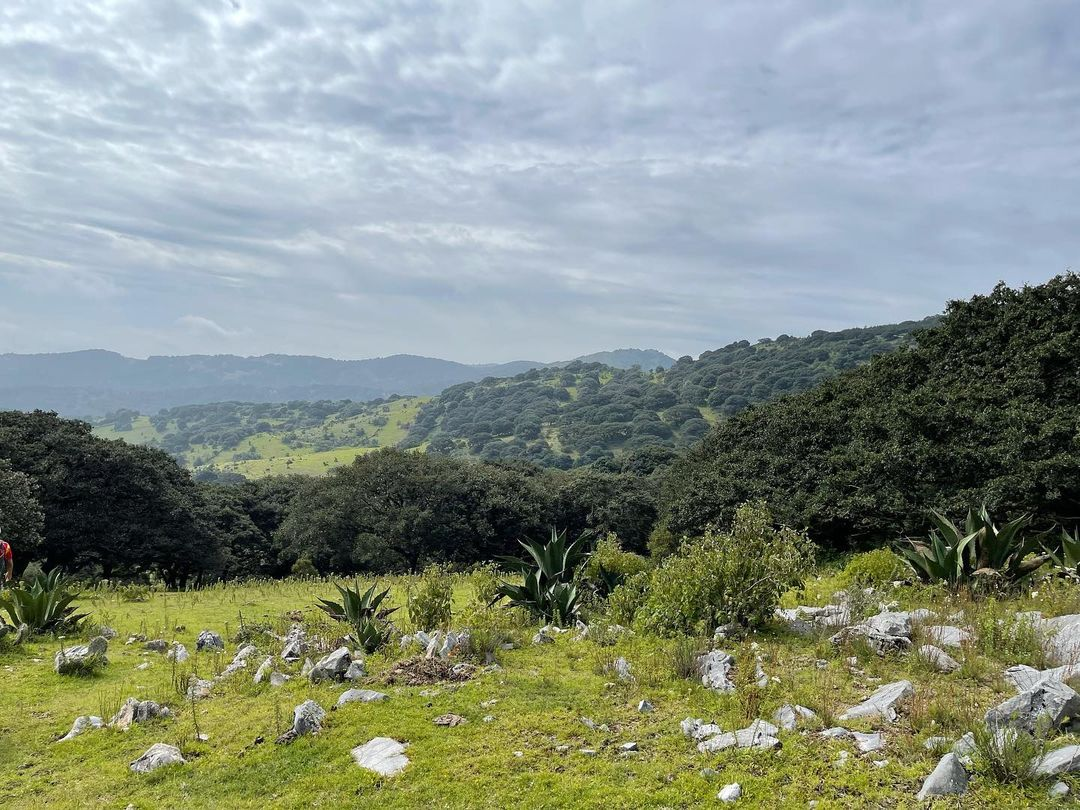
Trees in the Sierra de Álvarez in San Luis Potosí, Mexico.

Sierra de Álvarez Flora and Fauna Protection Area is a protected natural area in northeastern Mexico. It is located in the Sierra Madre Oriental of San Luis Potosí state. It was established in 2000 by the government of Mexico, and protects an area of 169.0 km^{2}.

== Flora and fauna ==
According to the National Biodiversity Information System of Comisión Nacional para el Conocimiento y Uso de la Biodiversidad (CONABIO) in Sierra de Álvarez Flora and Fauna Protection Area there are over 900 plant and animal species from which 39 are in at risk category and 21 are exotics.
