= San Luis Potosí =

State of Mexico

- State
- Free and Sovereign State of San Luis Potosí; Estado Libre y Soberano de San Luis Potosí (Spanish); Xikia'ani t'i to'ome teenek San Luis Potosí (Huastec)
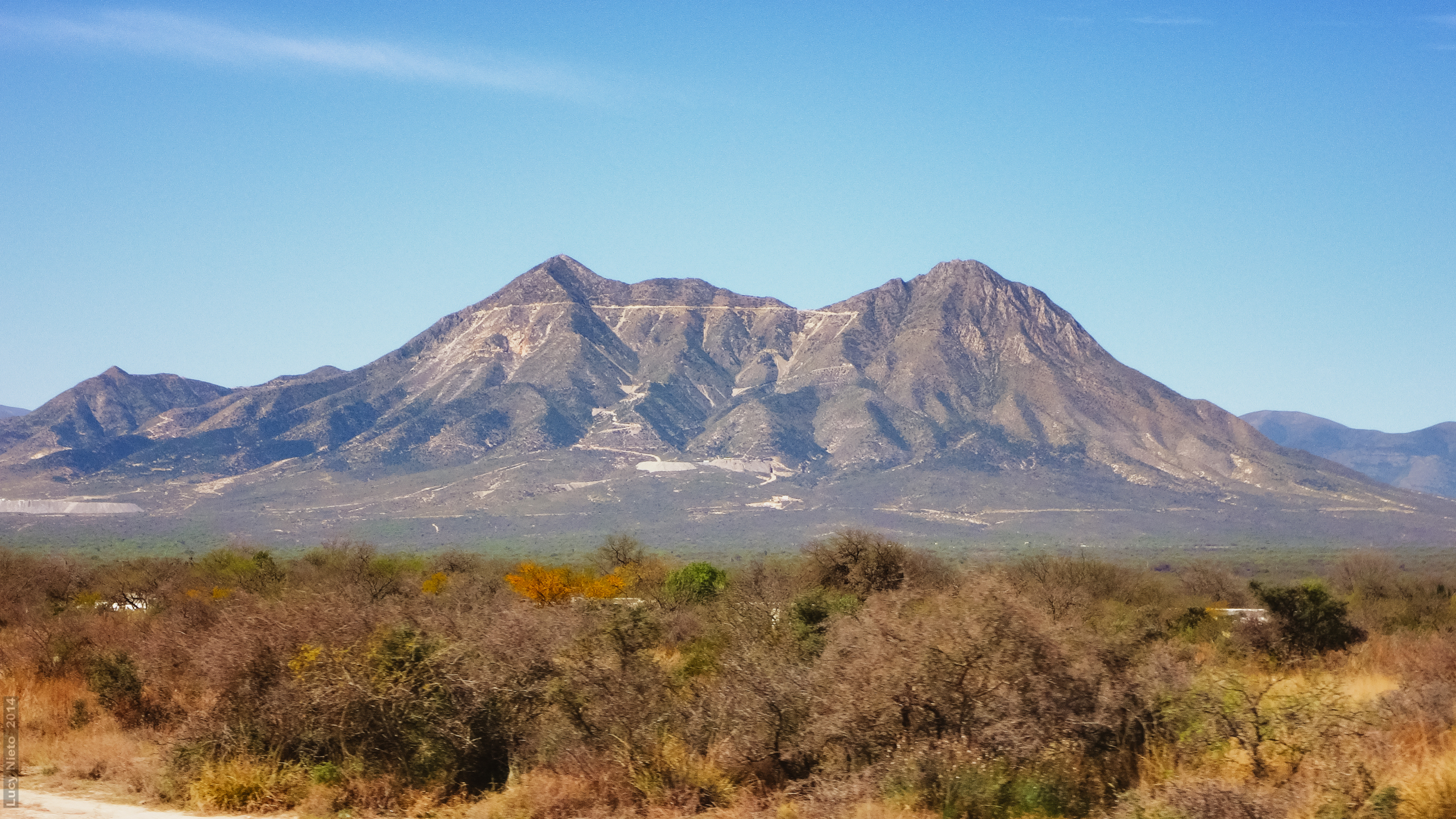
- View of Friar's Hill near Matehuala

- Coat of arms

- State of San Luis Potosí within Mexico
- Coordinates: 22°36′N 100°26′W
- Country: Mexico
- Capital and largest city: San Luis Potosí
- Largest metro: Greater San Luis Potosí
- Admission: December 22, 1823
- Order: 6th
- Municipalities: 59; see list

Government
  - Governor: Ricardo Gallardo
  - Parliament: Congress of San Luis Potosí
  - Senators: Ruth González Silva; Gilberto Hernández Villafuerte; Verónica Rodríguez Hernández
  - Deputies: Federal deputies: Roberto Alejandro Segovia Hernández (1st); Juan Manuel Navarro Muñíz (2nd); Kevin Angelo Aguilar Piña (3rd); Antolin Guerrero Márquez (4th); José Antonio Zapata Meraz (5th); Gilberto Hernández Villafuerte (6th); Christian Joaquín Sánchez Sánchez (7th)

Area
  - Total: 61,137 km^{2} (23,605 sq mi)
- Ranked 15th
- Highest elevation: 3,180 m (10,430 ft)

Population (2020)
  - Total: 2,822,255
  - Rank: 19th
  - Density: 46.163/km^{2} (119.56/sq mi)
  - Rank: 20th
- Demonym: Potosino (a)

GDP (2022)
  - Total: MXN 662 billion (US$33.0 billion)
  - Per capita: US$11,556
- Time zone: UTC−06:00 (Zona Centro)
- Postal code: 78-79
- Area code: Area codes 1 and 2: 444; 458; 481; 482; 483; 485; 486; 487; 488; 489; 496; 845
- ISO 3166 code: MX-SLP
- HDI: ▲0.782 high Ranked 20th of 32
- Website: www.slp.gob.mx

San Luis Potosí, (Note: Spanish pronunciation: [san ˈlwis potoˈsi]) officially the Free and Sovereign State of San Luis Potosí, (Note: Spanish: Estado Libre y Soberano de San Luis Potosí) is one of the 32 states which compose the Federal Entities of Mexico. It is divided in 59 municipalities and is named after its capital city, San Luis Potosí.

It is located in eastern and central Mexico and is bordered by seven other states: Nuevo León to the north; Tamaulipas to the north-east; Veracruz to the east; Hidalgo, Querétaro and Guanajuato to the south; and Zacatecas to the north-west. In addition to the capital city, other major cities in the state include Ciudad Valles, Matehuala, Rioverde, and Tamazunchale.

== History ==
In pre-Columbian times, the territory now occupied by the state of San Luis Potosí contained parts of the cultural areas of Mesoamerica and Aridoamerica. Its northern and western-central areas were inhabited by the Otomi and Chichimeca tribes. These indigenous groups were nomadic hunter-gatherers. Although many indigenous people died during Spanish colonization, Huasteco groups still live, along with Pame and Náhua peoples.

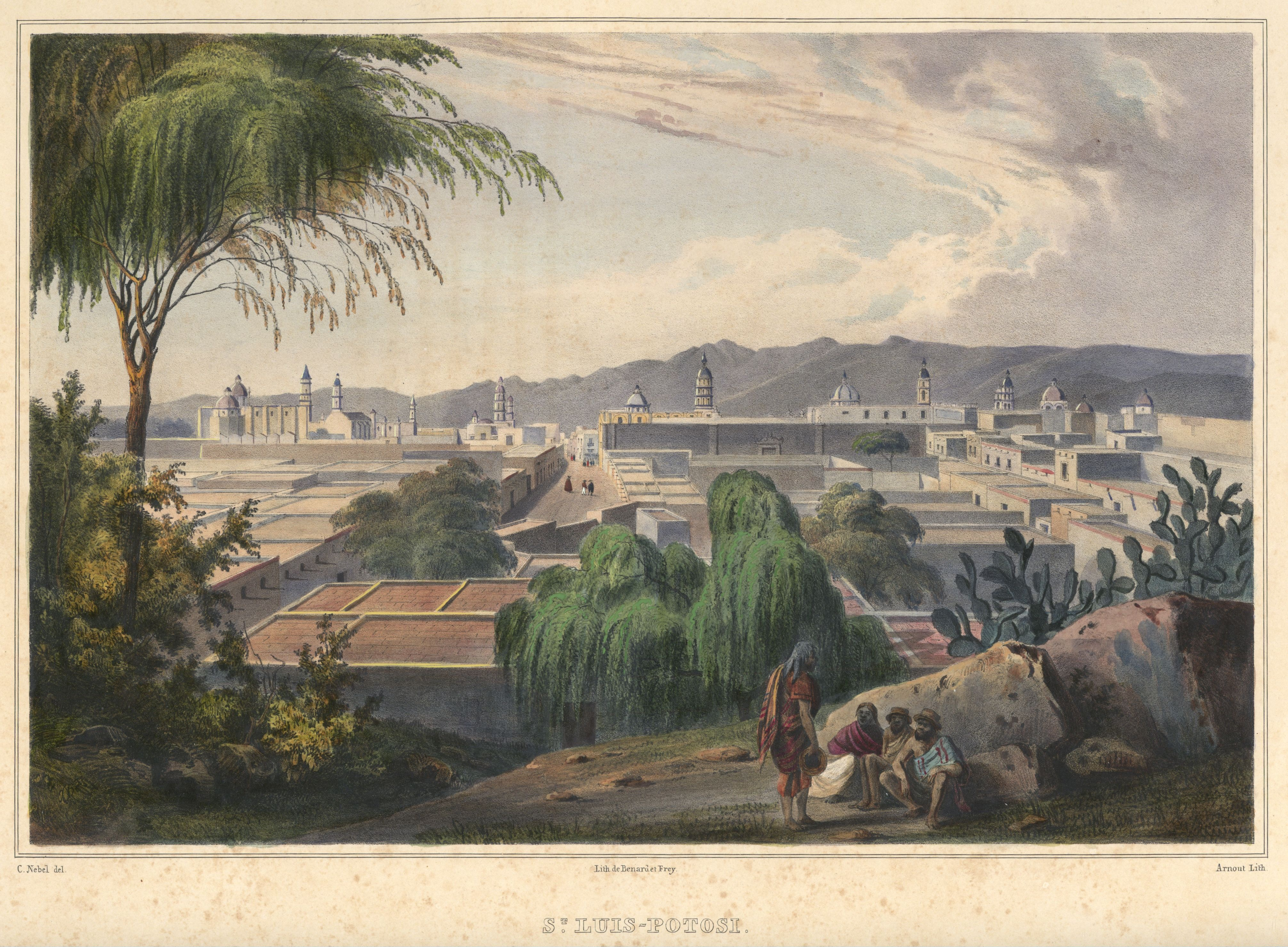
View of San Luis Potosí by Carl Nebel

In 1592, gold and silver deposits were discovered, which triggered the establishment of the state. Spanish miners established the first town known as "San Luis de Mezquitique", modern location of the capital San Luis Potosí. This led to Juan de Oñate being appointed as the first mayor.

The State was given the name "San Luis Rey", King Saint Louis, in honor of Louis IX of France, and "Potosí" because the wealth of the state compared to the rich silver mines in Potosí, Bolivia. Settlers had hopes of rivaling the wealth of the Bolivian mine, but this was never truly accomplished. In the 17th and 18th centuries, Franciscans, Augustinians, and Jesuits arrived in the area and settled, then began to build churches and other buildings, many of which are still standing and have been turned into museums and universities.

In mid-1821, after the Independence of Mexico, General Jose Antonio Echavarri intimidated and threatened the Mayor and the City Council to surrender the city of San Luis to the Army of the Three Guarantees of Agustín de Iturbide (Ejercito de las Tres Garantias de Iturbide), who at the time was emperor of Mexico. They submitted to his demand, as there was no way to resist, and thus proclamation of Independence of San Luis Potosí was declared. The first Constitution of San Luis Potosí was then written on October 16, 1826, and was in effect until 1835 when Congress proclaimed it centralist. At this point, local legislatures disappeared and state governors were appointed by the central government. This situation lasted until the promulgation of the 1857 Constitution.

The state's participation in the Mexican–American War in 1846–1847 gave it the name "San Luis de la Patria", which translates into English, Saint Louis of the Homeland, for having contributed important leaders and ideas during the struggle with the United States. During the Reform War, state involvement was very prominent, and during the French Intervention in 1863, the city of San Luis Potosí became the capital of the country under the order of President Benito Juárez.

During the regime of Maximilian, San Luis became an important location. The city was held by the Imperialists until late 1866. In that year, the telegraph line was opened between San Luis Potosí and Mexico City, which opened up communication lines and helped begin the industrialization of the state.

== Geography ==
The state lies mostly on the Mexican Plateau, with the exception of the eastern part of the state, where the tableland breaks down into the tropical valley of the Tampaon River (which continues flowing northwestward until it becomes the Pánuco River, which divides San Luis Potosí from the north-eastern state of Tamaulipas). The surface of the plateau is comparatively level, with some low mountainous wooded ridges. The Sierra Madre Oriental runs north and south through the state, and separates the Mexican Plateau from the Gulf Coastal Plain to the east. The Sierra Madre Oriental is home to the Sierra Madre Oriental pine-oak forests. The easternmost portion of the state lies on the Gulf Coastal Plain, and covered by the Veracruz moist forests. The eastern quarter of the state is known as the Huasteca potosina, part of La Huasteca, a geographical and cultural region along the Gulf of Mexico historically associated with the Huastec people.

The Tampaón river and its tributaries drain the southern and southeastern portion of the state. The northern and central portion of the state, including the capital, lie on an interior drainage basin which does not drain to the sea.

The mean elevation is about 1,800 m (6,000 ft), ensuring a mostly temperate climate. The state lies partly within the arid zone of the north, while the southern half receiving more rainfall through the influence of the Nortes, which deliver significant amounts of rain. The rainfall, however, is uncertain at the western and northern regions, and much of the state does not have major rivers. The soil is fertile and in favorable seasons large crops of wheat, maize, beans and cotton are grown on the uplands. In the low tropical valleys, sugar, coffee, tobacco, peppers and fruit are staple products. Livestock is an important industry and hides, tallow and wool are exported. Fine cabinet and construction woods are also made and exported to a limited extent.

Potosí (in Bolivia) was believed to have enough gold to build a bridge between Potosí and Spain. San Luis Potosí was compared to it upon the discovery of the mines and therefore named after it.

At one time San Luis Potosí ranked among the leading mining provinces of Mexico, but the revolts following independence resulted in a great decline in that industry. The area around Real de Catorce has some of the richest silver mines in the country. Other well-known silver mining districts are Peñón Blanco, Ramos and Guadalcázar. The development of Guadalcazar dates from 1620 and its ores yield gold, copper, zinc and bismuth, as well as silver. In the Ramos district, the Cocinera lode was said to have had a total yield of over $60,000,000 in the first decade of the 20th century.

Flora and fauna of San Luis Potosí
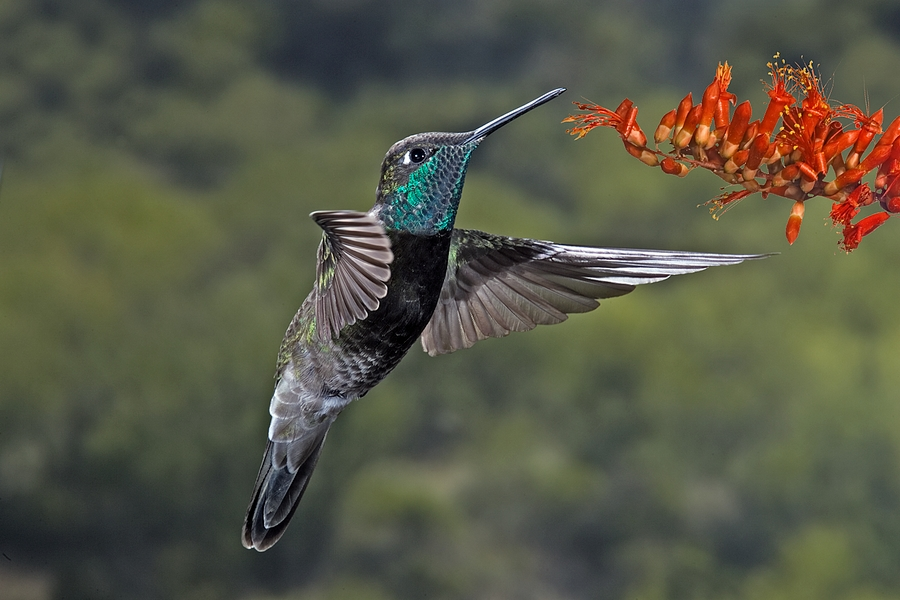
Eugenes fulgens

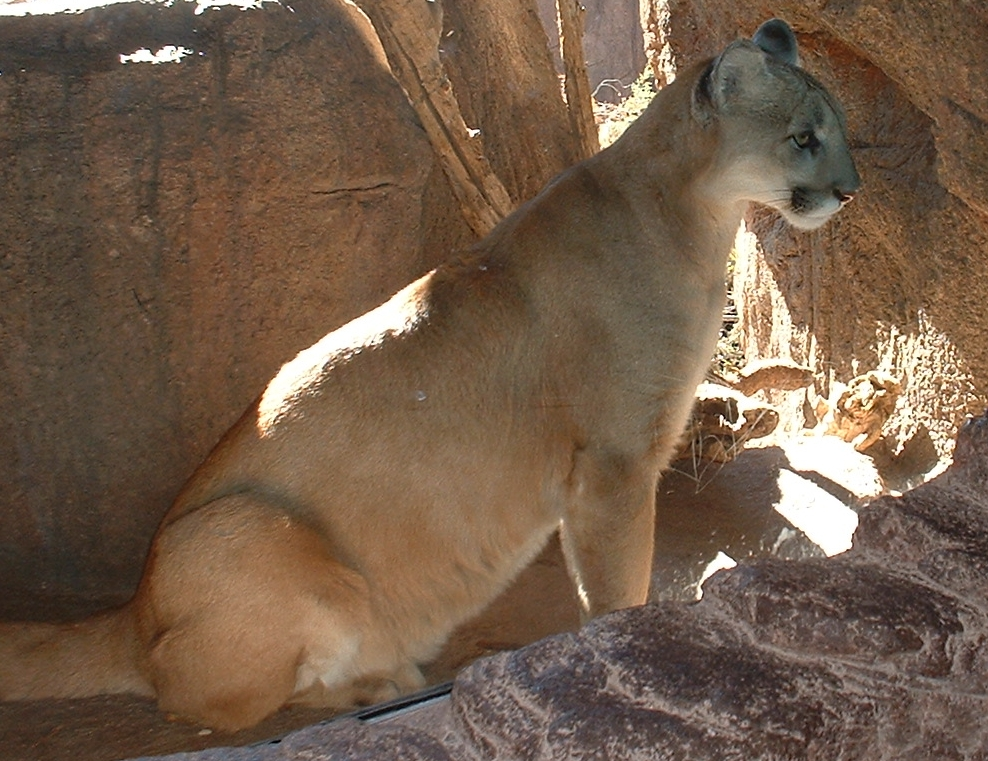
Puma concolor

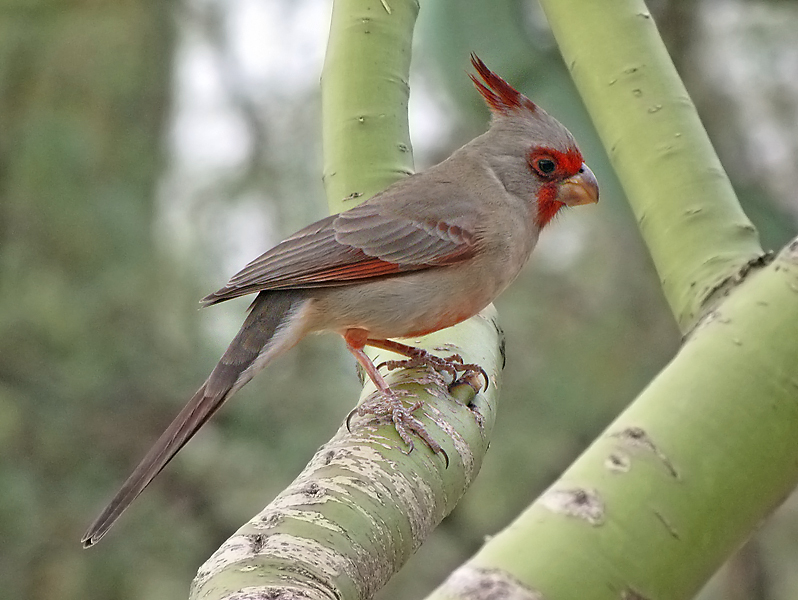
Cardinalis sinuatus

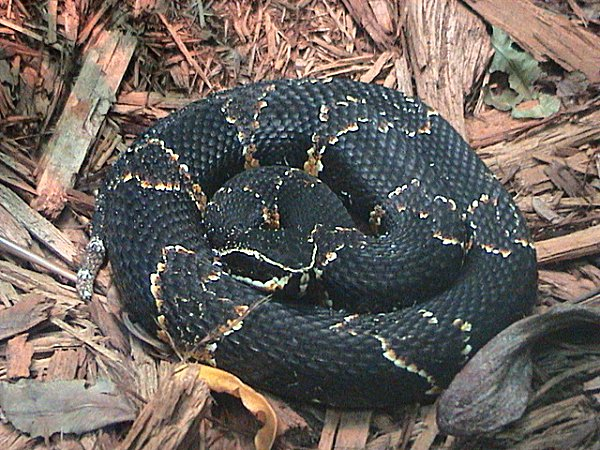
Agkistrodon taylori

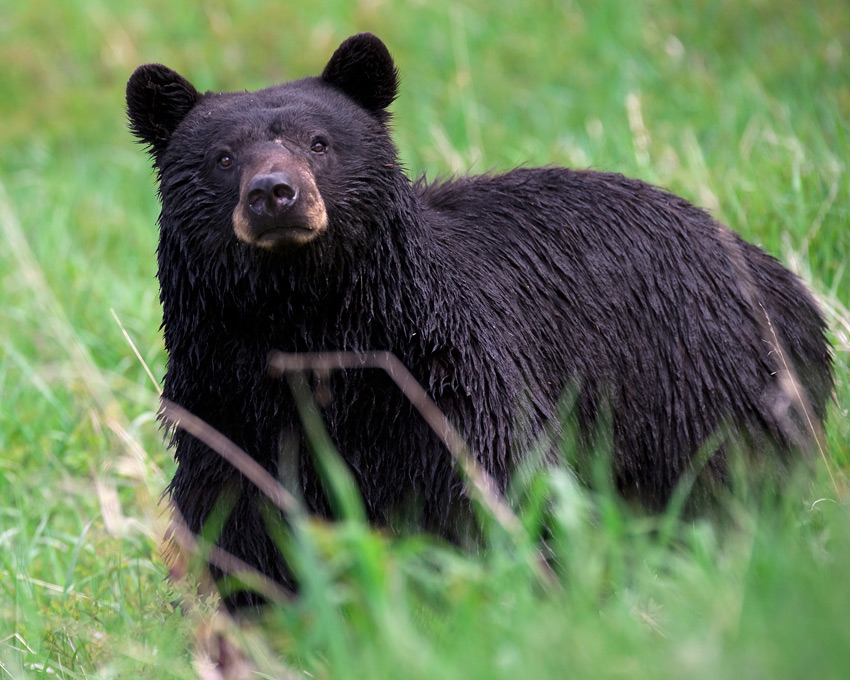
Ursus americanus

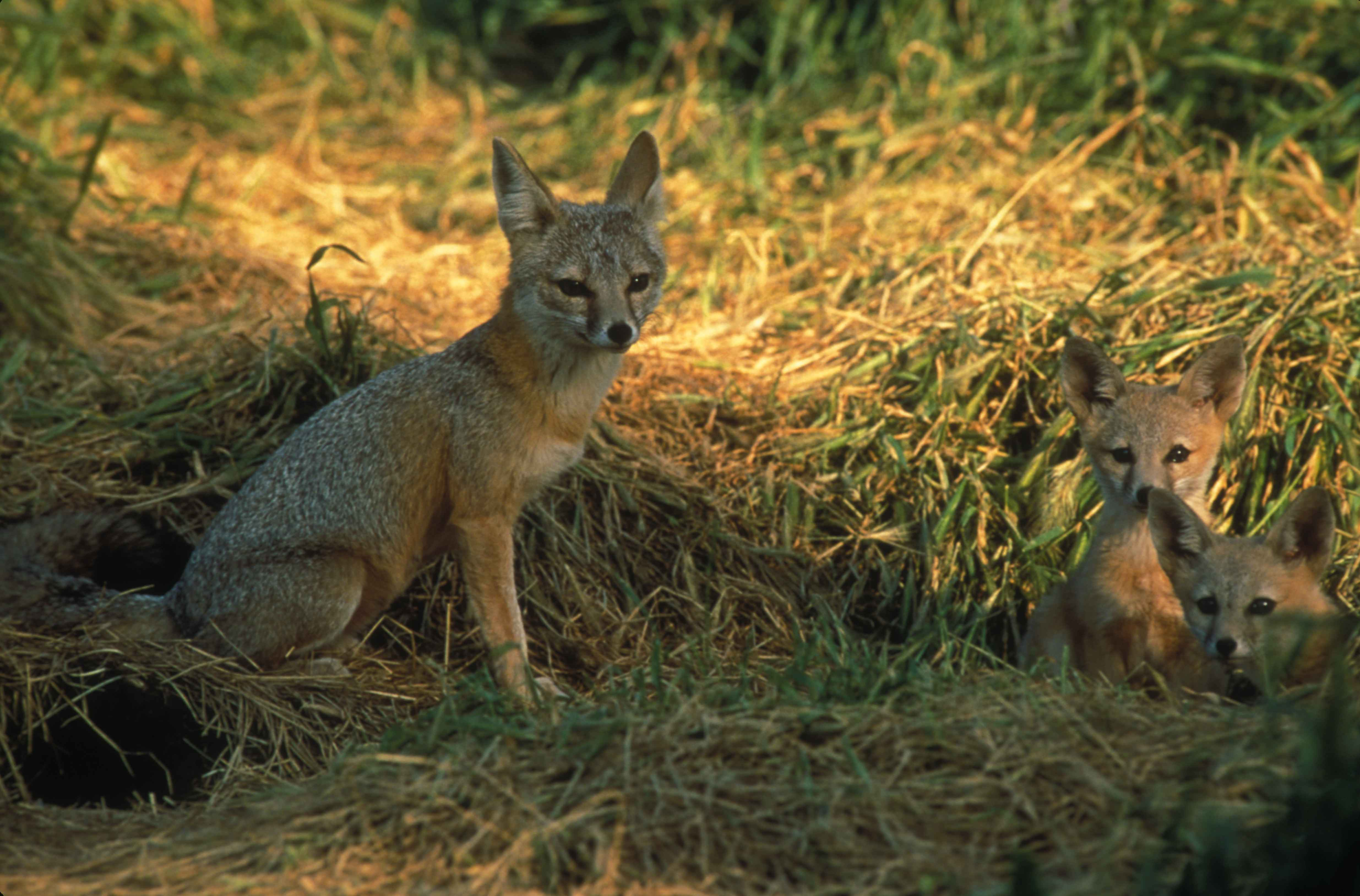
Vulpes macrotis

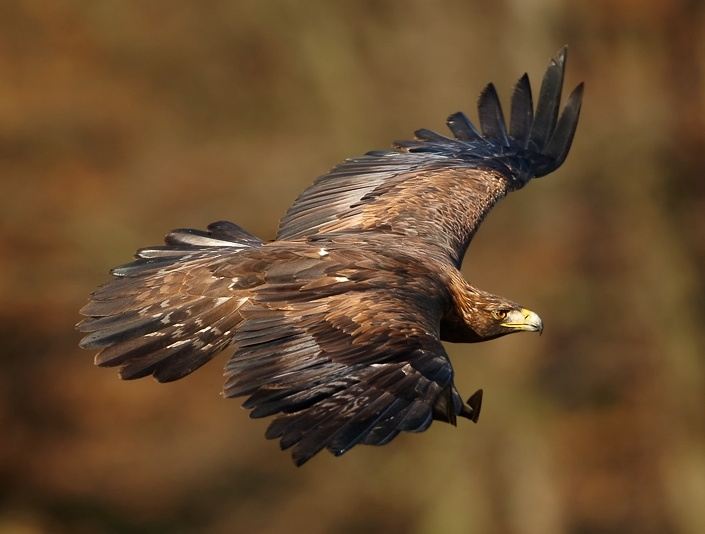
Aquila chrysaetos

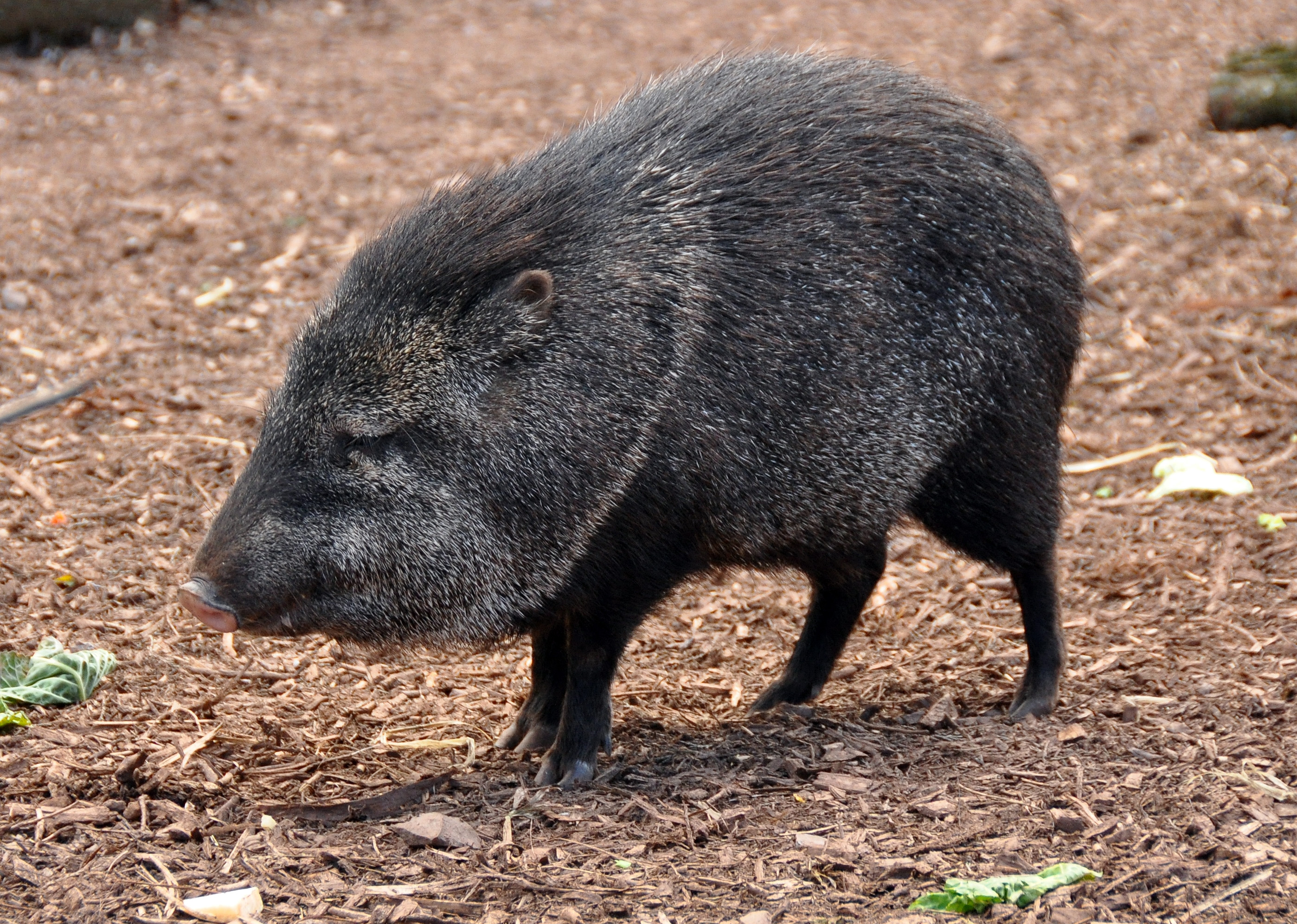
Pecari tajacu

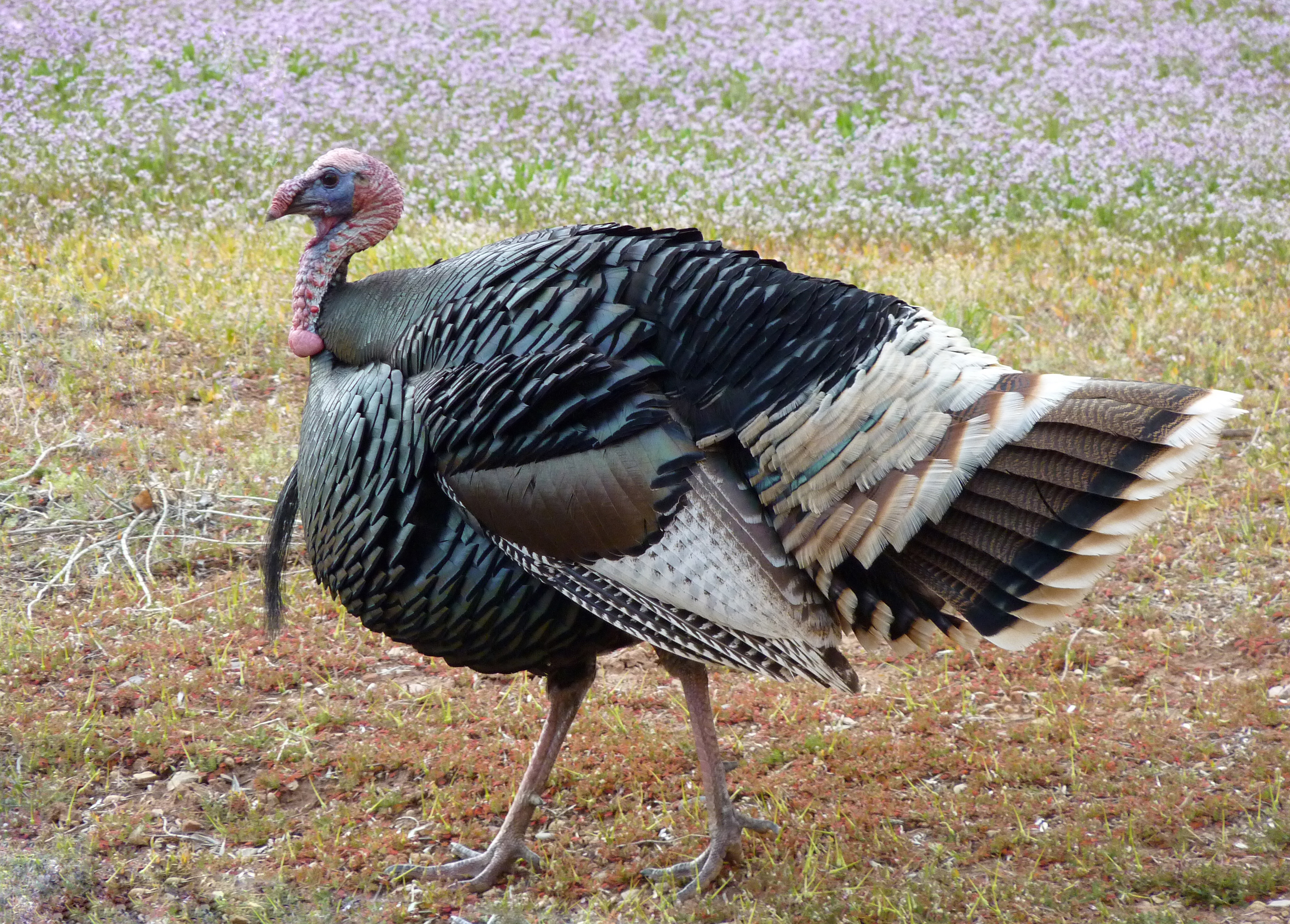
Meleagris gallopavo

Eleutherodactylus guttilatus

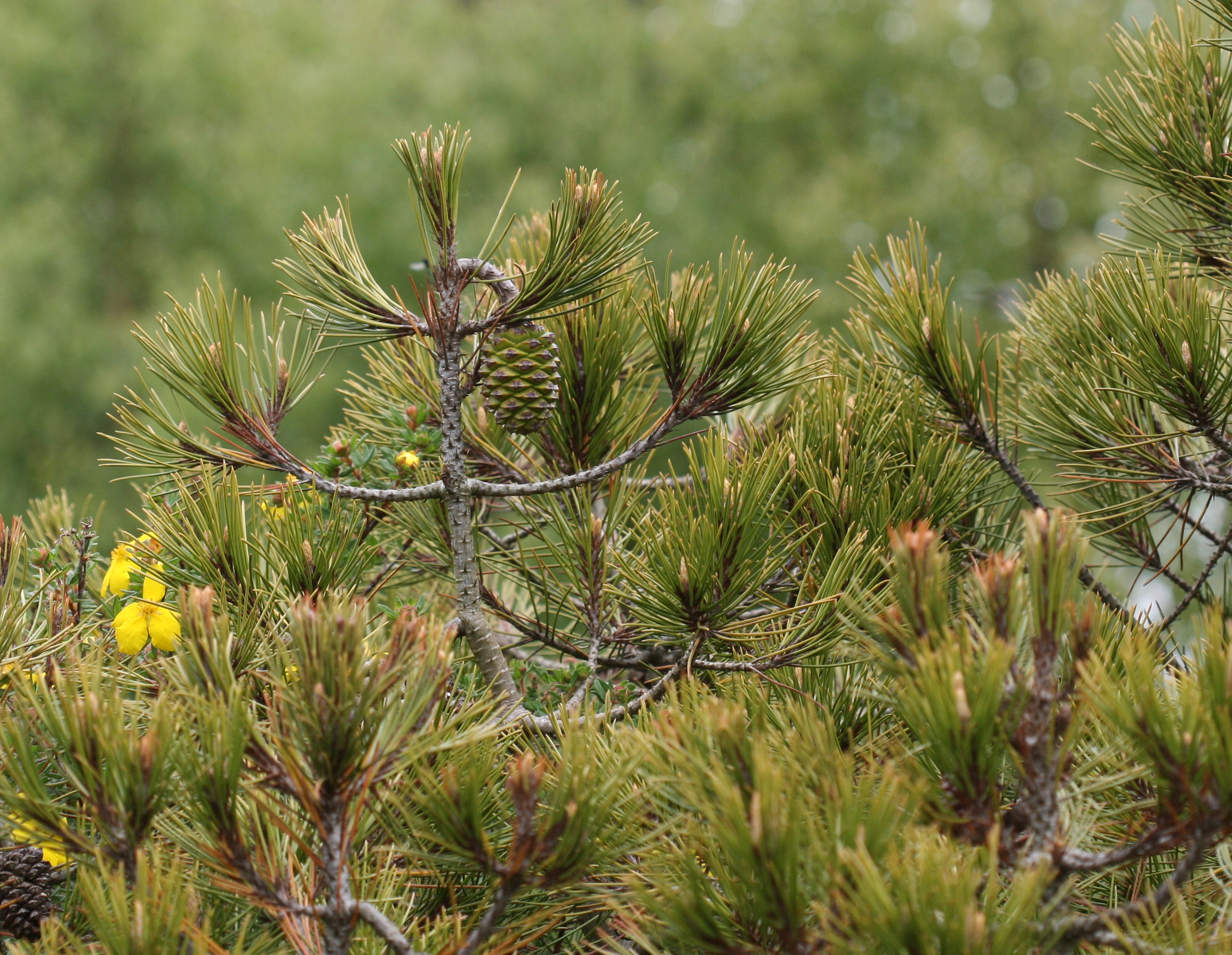
Pinus nelsonii

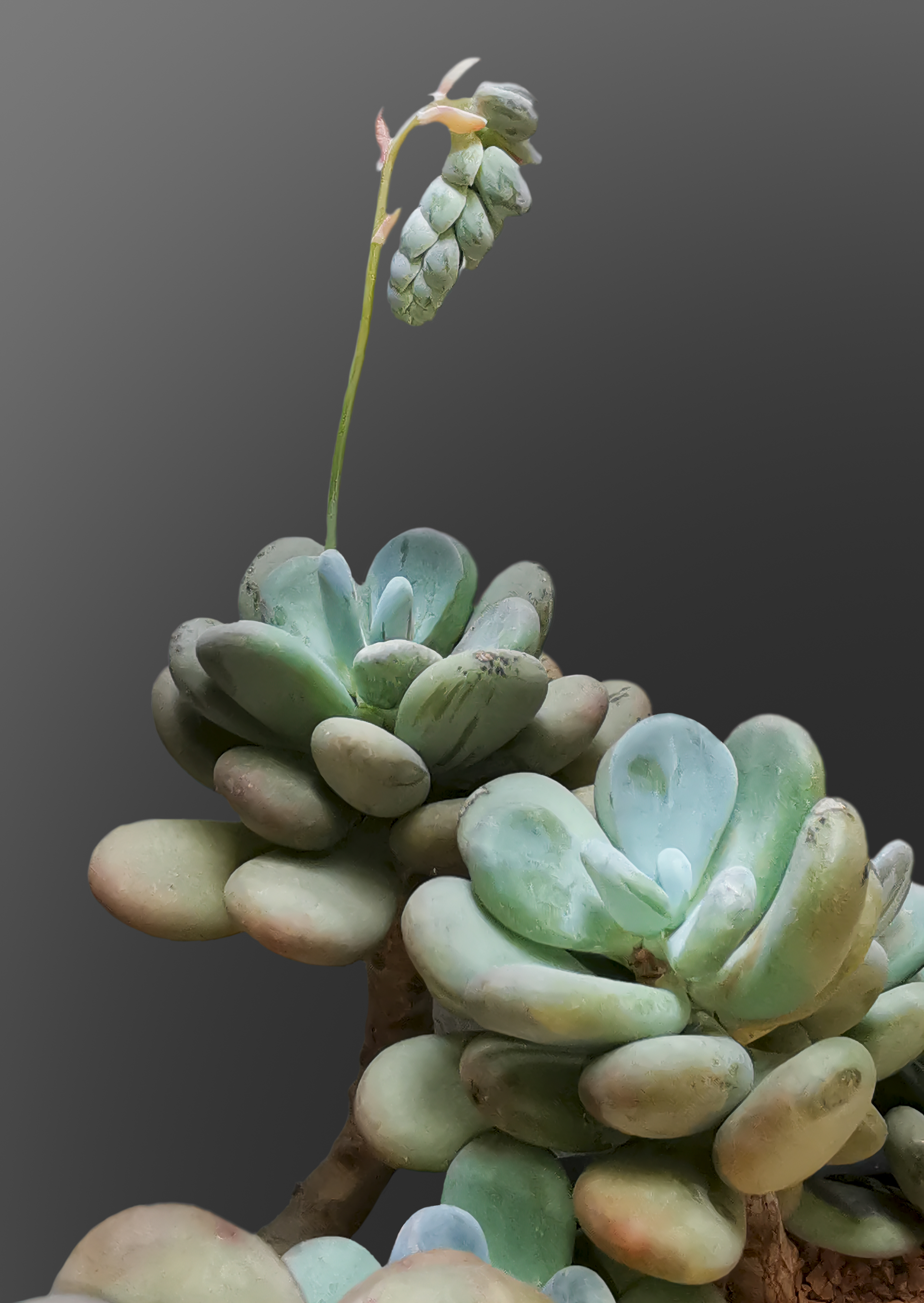
Pachyphytum oviferum

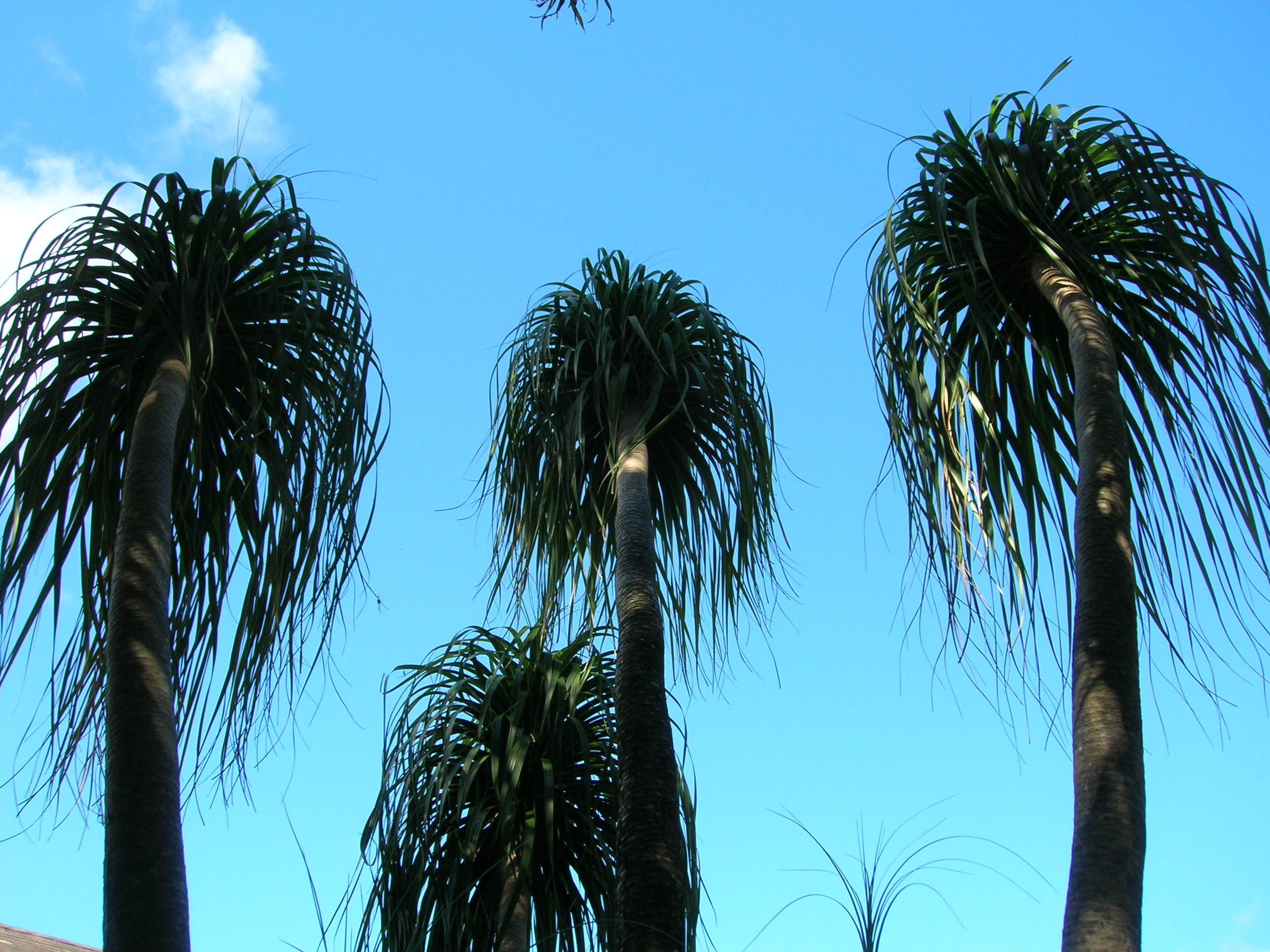
Beaucarnea recurvata

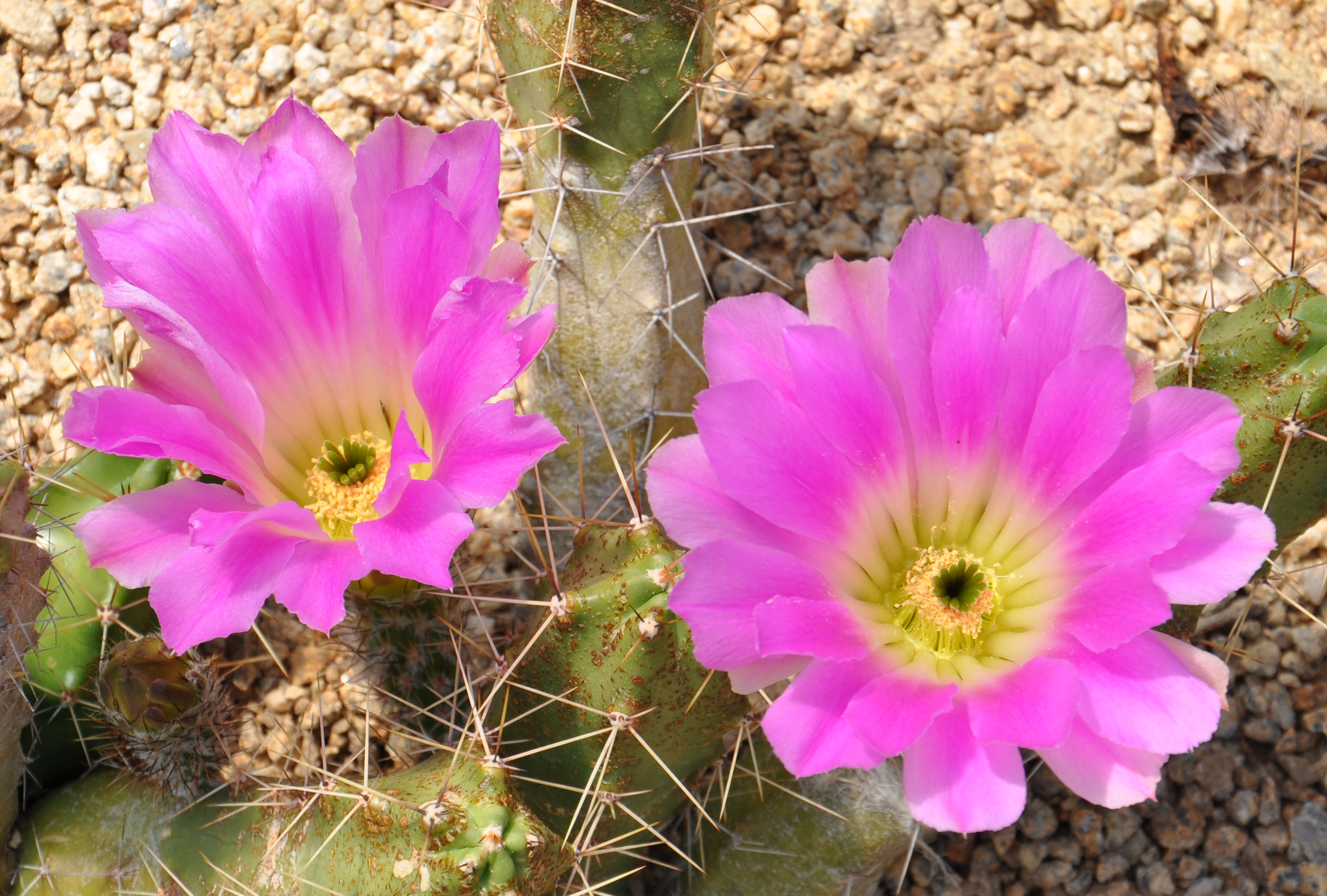
Echinocereus pentalophus

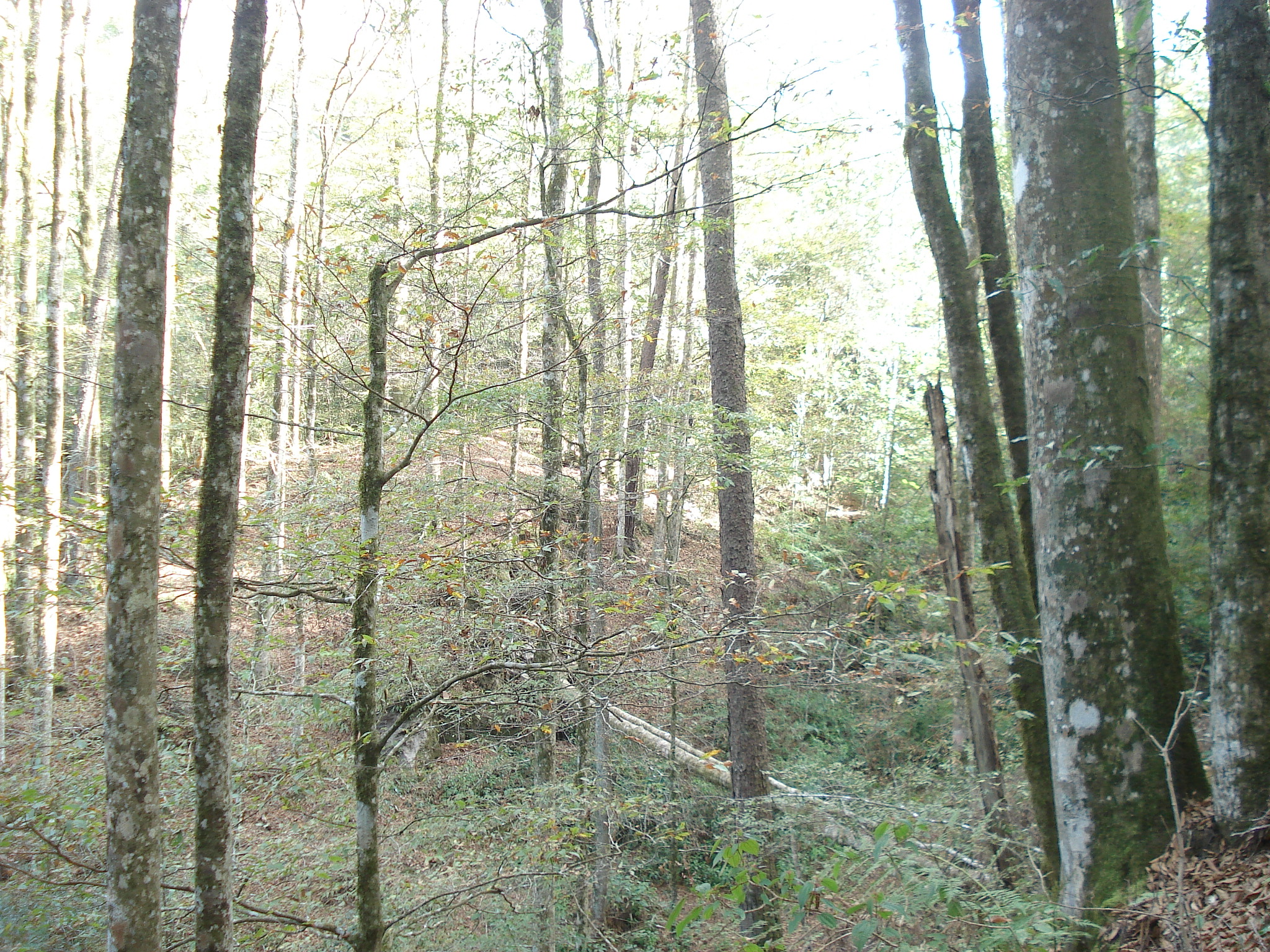
Fagus mexicana

=== Municipalities ===
As of 2024, the state of San Luis Potosí is divided into 59 municipalities (Spanish: municipios), each headed by a municipal president (mayor). These are similar in function to counties. As of the 2020 INEGI census, the largest municipalities by population are:

- San Luis Potosí (the state capital)
- Soledad de Graciano Sánchez
- Ciudad Valles
- Villa de Pozos
- Matehuala
- Rioverde
- Tamazunchale

=== Protected natural areas ===
The state has several protected elements included in the federal system of protected areas administered by the National Commission of Natural Protected Areas (CONANP):

- El Gogorrón National Park (declared in 1936, with 25,000 ha (62,000 acres), excluded from SINAP);
- El Potosí National Park (declared in 1936, with 2,000 ha (4,900 acres), excluded from SINAP);
- Sierra del Abra Tanchipa Biosphere Reserve (declared in 1994 with 21,464 ha (53,040 acres), SINAP 068).
- Sierra de Álvarez Flora and Fauna Protection Area (declared in 1981, with 16,900 ha (42,000 acres), excluded from SINAP);
- Sierra La Mojonera Flora and Fauna Protection Area (declared in 1981, with 9,201 ha (22,740 acres), excluded from SINAP);

It also has a Ramsar site declared in 2008, Arrochas y Manantiales de Tanchachín.

In addition, it has 12 other natural areas protected by state competition managed by the SEGAM (Secretariat of Ecology and Environmental Management):

- Natural Monument of "La Hoya de las Huahuas"
- Natural Monument of "The Basement of the Swallows"
- La Media Luna Spring State Park
- Palma Larga Manantial State Park
- Urban Park Paseo de la Presa de San José
- Ejido San Juan de Guadalupe Urban Park
- Sacred Natural Site "Caves of Wind and Fertility"
- Wirikuta Natural Sacred Site and the Huichol People's Historical Cultural Route
- "Real de Guadalcázar" State Reserve
- Sierra del Este and Sierra de En Medio State Reserve
- Spiny Forest Relic "Adolfo Roque Bautista Forest"
- Tancojol State Reserve

=== Environmental issues ===
==== Mining ====
In 1996, Minera San Xavier (MSX), a subsidiary of Canadian company New Gold, announced plans to start open pit mining at Cerro San Pedro. There was major opposition to the project, but in 2007, the mine started operating, and was still both active and disputed as of 2016.

One of the mountains within the state's declared National Sacred Site, Wirikuta, is being purchased for silver mining by a Canadian company, First Majestic Silver. The mountain is an important site for the Huichol ceremonial migration, Peyote hunt, and deer dance. On October 27, 2000, the United Nations Education, Scientific and Cultural Organization (UNESCO) claimed this site as a protected area for its importance as a cultural route and endemic flora and fauna species. Later on June 9, 2001, it was declared as a National Sacred Site under the State of San Luis Potosí's Natural Protection Act. First Majestic Silver Corp. still decided to purchase mineral rights on November 13, 2009, with 80% of their interest within the protected land. The company's current methods includes open pit mining and leaching through cyanide, using two kilograms of NaCN per tonne of ore. While open pit mining itself removes entire habitats and landscapes, the addition of sodium cyanide (with a mean lethal dose of only 0.2 grams) is potentially lethal. In April 2010 the company also opened a new cyanidation plant in Coahuila, Mexico, where it has started producing 3,500 tons of cyanide a day to help them expand their mining efforts. Currently the Huichol people are trying to find outside groups to help them in the conservation of their land and culture by protecting this mountain.

== Coat of arms ==
The coat of arms of the state shows Louis IX of France, after whom the state was named, standing on a hill in the town of Cerro de San Pedro, where gold and silver were discovered. The state was well known for its gold and silver mines, so there are two gold bars on the left and two silver bars on the right. The blue and yellow backgrounds represent night and day, respectively.

== Governors ==
The current governor, as of 2021, is Ricardo Gallardo Cardona of the Ecologist Green Party of Mexico.

== Economy ==
The State has a unique position within the country, since it is located in between three major cities; Mexico City, Monterrey, and Guadalajara, and near four major ports; Tampico, Altamira, Manzanillo, and Mazatlán. Its varied climate patterns and territory along with extensive communications networks enabled it to maintain attractive business environments.

Traditionally, the Real de Minas potosino has driven the industrial engines in the state of San Luis Potosí, and as such, nowadays basic metallurgy still has the largest contribution within the gross domestic product of the entity. The main metals and products extracted across mines are zinc, copper, lead, gold, silver, mercury, manganese, and arsenic. Other major industries following the mining lead are in the sectors of chemicals, foods, beverages, tobacco, and textiles.

The services sector, also known as tertiary, is second regarding contribution to the state's income with a 21%, followed by commerce, hotels and restaurants with 18%. These combined activities employ 51% of the economically active population or EAP.

Agriculture has been a traditional activity, sometimes still practiced in the Huasteca region. Currently, even if it contributes very little to the state GDP, it nevertheless employs as much as 20% of the EAP of the entity. The main agricultural products grown on Potosí soil are maize, beans, barley, sugar cane, oranges, coffee, sour lemon, prickly pear, and mango. Livestock activities are focused on raising sheep, cattle, and pigs.

The state is also a contributor to the large automotive industry of Mexico. General Motors now has a plant under construction, San Luis Potosí Assembly, to employ up to 1,800 people which will have the capacity to produce up to 160,000 vehicles per year, or about 440 cars per day.

ABB multinational in Mexico moved its headquarters from Mexico City to San Luis Potosí in 2007.

Throughout the state, major industrial parks can be seen, especially in highly urbanized areas such as the capital, San Luis Potosí, and other major cities.

The minimum wage in the state is 66.45 pesos per day as of 2015.

== Demographics ==
Largest cities or towns in San Luis Potosí Source:
Rank		Municipality	Pop.
1	San Luis Potosí	San Luis Potosí	824,229
2	Soledad de Graciano Sánchez	Soledad de Graciano Sánchez	309,342
3	Ciudad Valles	Ciudad Valles	177,022
4	Matehuala	Matehuala	99,015
5	Rioverde	Rioverde	94,191
6	Ciudad Fernández	Ciudad Fernández	32,006
7	Tamazunchale	Tamazunchale	24,562
8	Ébano	Ébano	24,296
9	Salinas de Hidalgo	Salinas	16,821
10	Tamuín	Tamuín	16,318

Historical population
Year	Pop.	±%
1895	571,420	—
1900	575,432	+0.7%
1910	627,800	+9.1%
1921	445,681	−29.0%
1930	579,831	+30.1%
1940	678,779	+17.1%
1950	856,066	+26.1%
1960	1,048,297	+22.5%
1970	1,281,996	+22.3%
1980	1,673,893	+30.6%
1990	2,003,187	+19.7%
1995	2,200,763	+9.9%
2000	2,299,360	+4.5%
2005	2,410,414	+4.8%
2010	2,585,518	+7.3%
2015	2,717,820	+5.1%
2020	2,822,255	+3.8%

The state of San Luis Potosí reports a population of 2,822,255 people. The population growth rate from 2010 to 2013 was about 3.6%.

The state's population is relatively young, 60% of its residents being under 30 years of age. The state reports a life expectancy rate similar to the national average, that is, 72 years for men, and 77 years of age for women.

Regarding cultural and ethnic diversity, 15% of the state population is indigenous, and the most representative language is Nahuatl, followed by Huasteco. The native people of the state include the Huastec and Pame peoples.

According to the 2020 census, 44.8% of San Luis Potosí's population identified as Indigenous, 8.2% Afro-Mexican, and 39.1% Spanish descent and 7.9% mix/other.

Concerning immigrants and people of European ancestry, 63% of the population has some form of European roots, mostly from Spain. During the colonization and establishment of Mexico, there was a constant flow of Spanish immigrants. There have also been large influxes during instabilities in Spain, such as during the Spanish Civil War. Besides Spanish people, there is also a significant population of descendants of Italian immigrants, especially in cities such as Rio Verde and Cerritos. Most of the European peoples have arrived through the state of Veracruz to the East.

Nonetheless, due to its relative isolation, the state is one of the nine states in Mexico which report high rates of migration into the United States between the years of 2000 to 2008.

== Education ==
The average schooling rate for those over 15 years of age lies at 7.7 years of education, considerably lower than the 8.1 found nationally. The same portion of those older than the age of 15 yield a 28% dropout rate of primary school. Children under the age of 14 years have a 4% school dropout rate. The literacy rate is about 90.8%, most of the illiterate being the older generation. There is only one major university in the state, Autonomous University of San Luis Potosí (UASLP).

Other higher education institutions include:

- Instituto Tecnológico de San Luis Potosí (ITSLP).
- Instituto Tecnológico y de Estudios Superiores de Monterrey, Campus San Luis Potosí (ITESM).
- Universidad del Valle de México, Campus San Luis Potosí (UVM).
- Universidad Cuauhtémoc, Campus San Luis Potosí (UCSLP).
- Universidad Tecnológica de San Luis Potosí (UTSLP).
- Universidad Politécnica de San Luis Potosí (UPSLP).
- College of San Luis Potosí (COLSAN).
- Instituto Universitario del Centro de México (UCEM).

== Media ==
Newspapers of San Luis Potosí include: Diario Regional El Mañana de Valles, El Sol de San Luis, Esto del Centro, Gran Diario Regional Zona Media El Mañana de Rioverde, La Jornada de San Luis, La Prensa del Centro, and Pulso Diario de San Luis.

== Transportation ==
Ponciano Arriaga International Airport serves the capital of San Luis Potosí (named the same) with a variety of domestic and international daily flights. Other cities such as Matehuala, Tamuin and Rioverde also have airports but they only serve domestic flights.

Besides airports, the state has an extensive road network, like the rest of the country. Most of the roads are paved in urban areas and highways. Some small towns, however, have cobblestone streets.

== Notable people and residents ==
Arts and sciences

- Ana Bárbara – singer-songwriter
- Cenobio Hernandez – composer
- Julián Carrillo Trujillo – discovered the Thirteenth Sound theory of microtonal music.
- Francisco González Bocanegra – author of the Mexican National Anthem
- Manuel José Othón – poet
- Eugenia Campbell Nowlin – American artist and artist administrator, born in San Luis Potosí.

Politics

- Ponciano Arriaga
- Mariano Arista – president of Mexico from 1851 to 1853
- Miguel Barragán – President of Mexico
- Carlos Jonguitud Barrios
- Luis Ernesto Derbez
- Alfonso Lastras Ramírez
- Salvador Nava Martínez
- Francisco Javier Salazar Sáenz
- Enrique Márquez Jaramillo

Sports

- Ivan Becerra – former professional football player
- Jesús Cruz – Major League Baseball pitcher
- Nery Castillo – former professional football player, was born in San Luis Potosí but moved away when he was 3 months old.
- Alberto Del Rio – WWE wrestler
- José Garfias – racing driver
- Mil Máscaras – professional wrestler
- Luis Enrique Muñoz – professional football player
- Juan Sánchez Purata – professional football player

Journalism

- Jesús Blancornelas – a prize-winning journalist

== See also ==
- La Huasteca
