= Cañón del Usumacinta =

- Usumacinta Canyon
- IUCN category VI (protected area with sustainable use of natural resources)
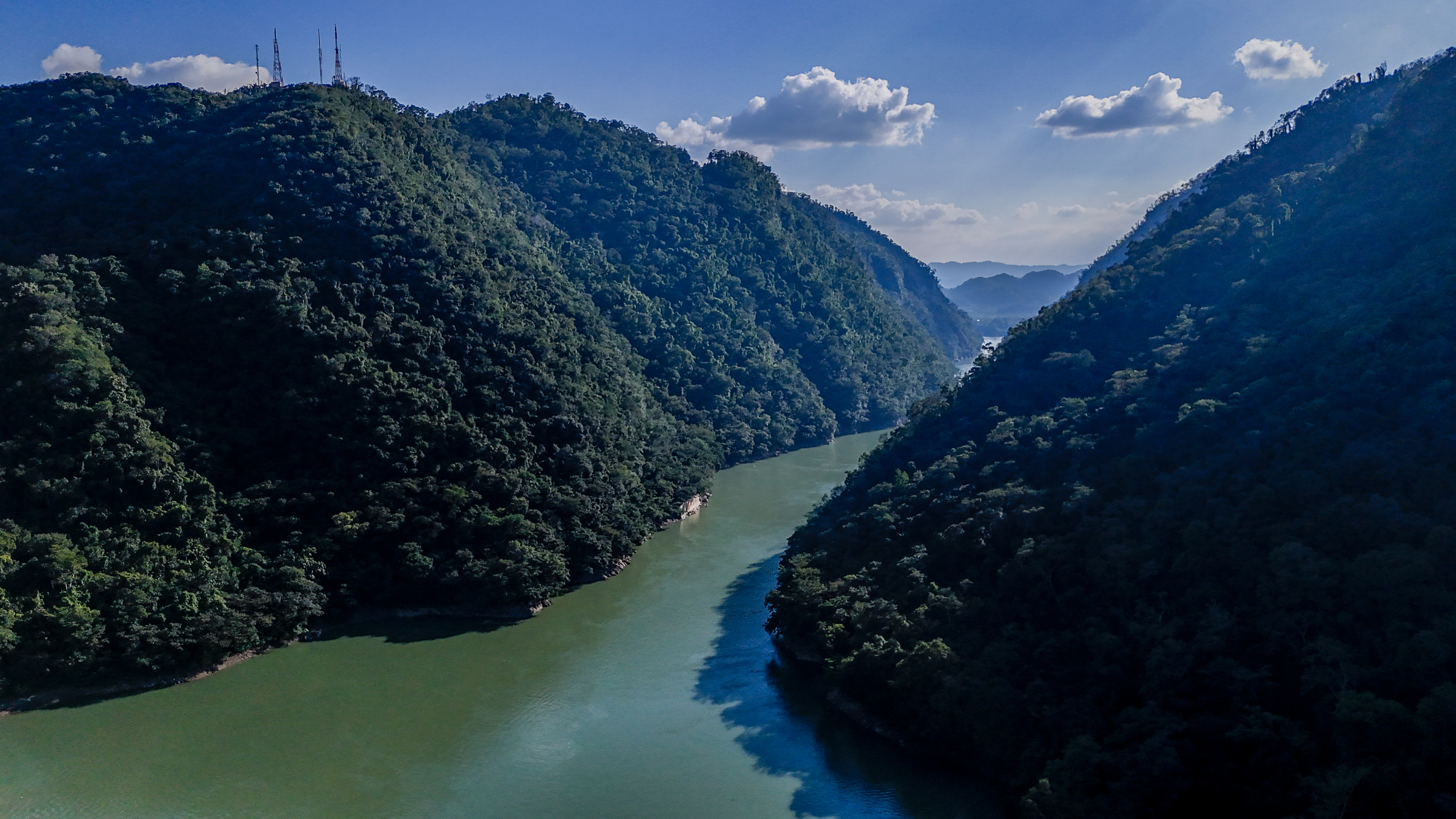

- Location within Mexico
- Location: Tenosique, Tabasco, Mexico
- Coordinates: 17°23′17″N 91°23′44″W
- Area: 461.28 km^{2} (178.10 sq mi)
- Designation: Flora and fauna protection area
- Designated: 2008
- Governing body: National Commission of Natural Protected Areas

Cañón del Usumacinta is a protected natural area in southern Mexico.

It protects part of the Usumacinta Canyon, where the Usumacinta River winds northwards in a narrow gorge which cuts through parallel ridges. It is located in the state of Tabasco, on the border with Guatemala.

== Geography ==
The Cañón del Usumacinta Flora and Fauna Protection Area covers 461.28 km^{2}. The Usumacinta River forms the western boundary of the protected area. The Guatemalan border forms its southern boundary, where it adjoins Guatemala's Sierra del Lacandón National Park.

== Flora and fauna ==
The Cañón del Usumacinta is in the Petén–Veracruz moist forests ecoregion, evergreen tropical rain forests that extend from Mexico's southern Gulf Coastal Plain across northern Guatemala and Belize to the Caribbean Sea.

High evergreen rain forest is the predominant plant community, with areas of low thorn forest.
