= Coat of arms of San Luis Potosí =

Coat of Arms of San Luis Potosí
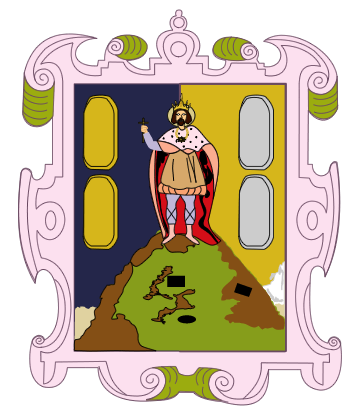

The coat of arms of San Luis Potosí was adopted in 1658.

== Symbolism ==
The coat of arms is divided into two fields, one blue and one gold. In the center, the figure of Saint Louis, King of France, who in turn is on top of the Cerro de San Pedro, holding the Holy Cross. In the gold field, there are two silver bars and in the blue one there are two gold bars. Everything is framed in an irregular gold border.

The shield was given by Viceroy Francisco Fernández de la Cueva y Enríquez de Cabrera in 1656 to the then city of San Luis Minas del Potosí of New Spain together with its title of city and was officially confirmed by King Philip IV in Madrid in 1658.

=== Historical coats ===
The symbol is used by all successive regimes in San Luis Potosí, in different forms.

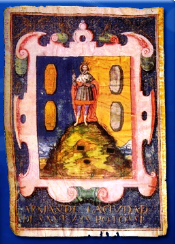
Coat of arms from 1712 to 1979.

== See also ==
- San Luis Potosí
- Coat of arms of Mexico
