= Tutuaca Flora and Fauna Protection Area =

Protected area in northwestern Mexico

- IUCN category VI (protected area with sustainable use of natural resources)
- Location within Mexico
- Location: Chihuahua and Sonora, Mexico
- Coordinates: 28°28′53.3″N 108°14′59.6″W
- Area: 436,986 ha (1,687.21 sq mi)
- Designated: 2001
- Administrator: National Commission of Natural Protected Areas

Tutuaca Flora and Fauna Protection Area is a protected area in the states of Chihuahua and Sonora in northwestern Mexico. It lies in the Sierra Madre Occidental, and covers an area of 4369.86 km^{2}. To the southeast it adjoins Papigochic Flora and Fauna Protection Area.

It preserves a portion of the Sierra Madre Occidental pine–oak forests.

The reserve was designated in 2001.

== Flora and fauna ==
According to the National Biodiversity Information System of Comisión Nacional para el Conocimiento y Uso de la Biodiversidad (CONABIO) in Tutuaca Flora and Fauna Protection Area there are over 1,510 plant and animal species from which 57 are in at risk category and 50 are exotics.
