= Nahá–Metzabok =

Biosphere reserve in Mexico

Nahá–Metzabok Biosphere Reserve
- Nahá Flora and Fauna Protection Area; Metzabok Flora and Fauna Protection Area
- IUCN category VI (protected area with sustainable use of natural resources)
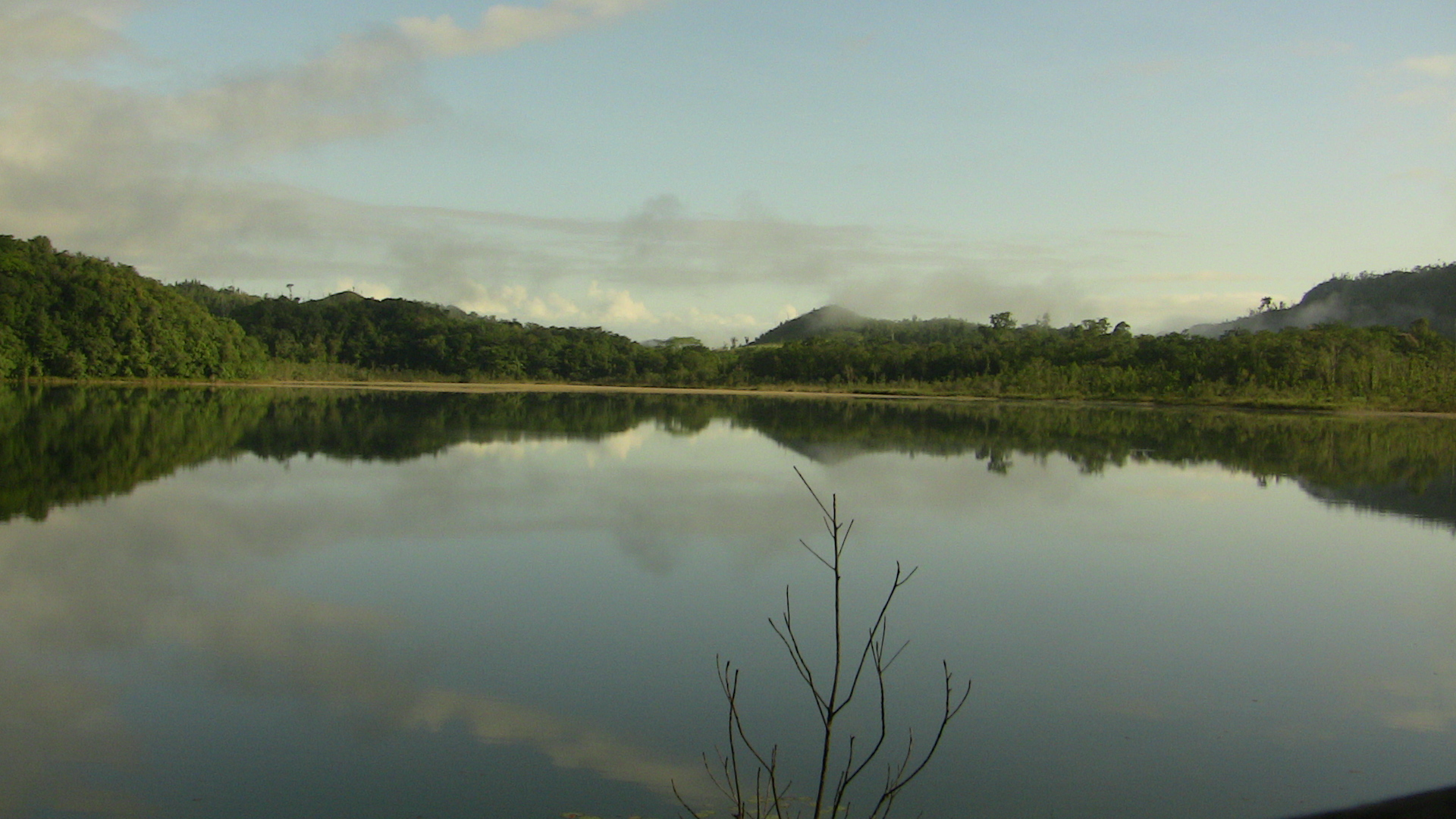
- Nahá Lake

- Location within Mexico
- Location: Ocosingo, Chiapas, Mexico
- Coordinates: 17°03′N 91°36′W
- Area: 134.53 km^{2} (51.94 sq mi)
- Designation: UNESCO-MAB Biosphere Reserve (2009)

Ramsar Wetland
- Official name: Áreas de Protección de Flora y Fauna de Nahá y Metzabok
- Designated: 2 February 2004
- Reference no.: 1331

Nahá–Metzabok Biosphere Reserve is a biosphere reserve in southeastern Mexico. It is located in the state of Chiapas, on the northeastern flank of the Chiapas Highlands. The reserve protects montane rain forests, pine and oak forests, and natural lakes.

== Geography ==
The reserve encompasses two separate flora and fauna protection areas, Metzabok and Nahá, and a buffer zone around them. Metzabok Flora and Fauna Protection Area has an area of 33.68 km^{2}.

Nahá Flora and Fauna Protection Area is located to the southeast of Metzabok, and has an area of 38.47 km^{2}.

The reserve has a rugged topography, composed of parallel folded ranges of hills extending from northwest to southeast. The underlying geology is principally limestone. There are karstic plateaus atop the ridges, and narrow valleys and ravines separate the ridges. Elevations range from 840 to 1,280 meters above sea level.

Water has dissolved the porous limestone, creating caverns, sinkholes, and sinkhole lakes (cenotes). Some of the lakes are isolated, while others have underground connections with each other and/or surface rivers and streams. The Nahá and Metzabok lake systems are connected to each other, and together form a closed basin.

Lake Nahá (also known as Lake Naja) is located in the Nahá reserve, at 16°59'27.6"N and 91°35'29.6"W. The lake is approximately 1 km in diameter and 30 m deep. It is a karstic lake in a mountain basin, with the lake surface at approximately 830 meters elevation surrounded by mountains up to 1200 meters elevation. The Nahá River drains northwards from Lake Nahá towards the Metzabok lakes.

Metzabok's lake system includes 21 lakes of different sizes, most of which are interconnected when the water level is high. The largest lakes are Lake Tzibaná (1.24 km^{2} and 70 m maximum depth) and Lake Metzabok (0.83 km^{2} and 25 m maximum depth). They are located at 17º6'30" to 17º8'30" N and 91º36'30" to 91º38'50" W, and the lake level is approximately 550 meters elevation. The Nahá River is the principal surface tributary, although the lakes may have additional subsurface inflows. There is no known surface or sub-surface outflow, and the Nahá and Metzabok lakes are considered a closed system. Lake levels typically fluctuate by about 10 meters annually with seasonal rainfall patterns. During a drought from March to August 2019, Lake Metzabok dried up completely and the water level in Lake Tzibaná dropped by 15 meters.

The reserve is in the transition between the foothill Lacandon rainforest (Selva Lacandona) and the montane cloud forests and pine-oak forests of the Chiapas Highlands.

== Climate ==
The reserve has a tropical rain forest climate. Mean annual temperature is above 22º C. Average annual rainfall is 2500 mm, which falls mostly between May and October.

== Flora and fauna ==
Flora in reserve ranges from pine–oak forest to montane evergreen cloud forest, foothill rain forest, and wetlands.

Lower montane rain forest grows between 400 and 800 meters elevation, including around Lake Nahá. Characteristic trees include Brosimum alicastrum, Guatteria spp., Hirtella americana, Licania hypoleuca, Spondias radlkoferi, Terminalia amazonia, Virola koshnii, and Guarea spp.

Pine-oak forest grows on the ridges, characterized by species of pine (Pinus) and oak (Quercus), with Carpinus tropicalis, Myrica cerifera, Styrax argenteus, and species of alder (Alnus) and walnut (Juglans).

40,000 plant and animal species live in the reserve. These include 48% of the Mexico's bird species, 33% of bats, 11% of reptiles, and 25% of the mammals in only 0.4% of the country's land area.

The karstic sinkholes and lakes create distinctive wetland habitats, which is recognized by the reserve's Ramsar designation.

== Conservation ==
Nahá and Metzabok flora and fauna protection areas were designed in 1998. The Nahá and Metzabok flora and fauna protection areas were designated a Ramsar site (wetland of international importance) in 2004. The Ramsar site covers 72.16 km^{2}. The biosphere reserve, encompassing the two flora and fauna protection areas and a buffer zone, was designated in 2009.

The Lacandon, Tzeltal, and Ch'ol Maya peoples live in the reserve. Communal land tenure within the reserve's core zone is recognized by the Mexican Government. Land tenure in the buffer zone is principally ejidos.

Threats to the reserve include water pollution from pesticide runoff, habitat fragmentation from forest clearance for timber and agriculture, and increased fire risk.
