= Jorge L. Soberón =

Mexican biologist and biodiversity expert

- Born: Jorge Luciano Soberón Mainero; Mexico
- Education: Universidad Nacional Autónoma de México (B.S., M.S.); Imperial College London (Ph.D.)
- Known for: Ecological niche modeling Biodiversity policy Species distribution modeling
- Awards: Distinguished Mexicans Award (2018); Member, American Academy of Arts and Sciences (2018)
- Scientific career
- Fields: Ecology, Theoretical ecology, Biodiversity informatics
- Workplaces: University of Kansas
- Website: biodiversity.ku.edu/people/jorge-soberon

Jorge L. Soberón is a biologist, theoretical ecologist, and biodiversity policy expert. He is a University Distinguished Professor in the Department of Ecology and Evolutionary Biology and a Senior Scientist at the Biodiversity Institute at the University of Kansas.

== Academic career ==
From 1982 to 2005, Soberón held faculty positions at UNAM, first at the Instituto de Biología and later at the Instituto de Ecología. In 1992, he was appointed Executive Secretary of Mexico’s Comisión Nacional para el Conocimiento y Uso de la Biodiversidad (CONABIO), a federal agency under the executive authority of the President of Mexico. He directed CONABIO for 13 years.

In 2005, he joined the University of Kansas as a Senior Scientist at the Biodiversity Institute, and in 2008 became a professor in the Department of Ecology and Evolutionary Biology. He was named University Distinguished Professor in 2014. From January 2021 to July 2024, he served as Director of the Biodiversity Institute, including the Natural History Museum.

== Research ==
Soberón's research focuses on species distribution modeling, ecological niches, and the biogeographic assembly of communities. He has contributed to foundational frameworks in ecological niche theory and the analysis of species’ geographic distributions. His work often integrates quantitative modeling with policy and conservation goals.

He has also explored the relationship between biodiversity governance, scientific capacity, and policy implementation across global and national scales. At the University of Kansas, he continues to develop theoretical advances in dynamic species distributions while fostering interdisciplinary and multicultural approaches to biodiversity.

== Selected honors ==
- 2008: Society for Conservation Biology Service Award
- 2012: Award by the President of Mexico Felipe Calderon, for services to the biodiversity of Mexico Premio por Servicios a la Biodiversidad
- 2018: Distinguished Mexicans Award by the Mexican Ministry of Foreign Affairs
- 2018: Member of the American Academy of Arts and Sciences
- 2024: Distinguished Fellow Award by International Biogeography Society

== Selected publications ==
- Peterson, A. T., Soberón, J., Pearson, R. G., Anderson, R. P., Martínez-Meyer, E., Nakamura, M., & Araújo, M. (2011). Ecological Niches and Geographic Distributions. Princeton University Press.
- Peterson, A. T., Soberón, J., & Sánchez-Cordero, V. (1999). Conservatism of ecological niches in evolutionary time. Science, 285:1265–1267.
- Soberón, J., & Osorio-Olvera, L. (2023). A dynamic theory of the area of distribution. Journal of Biogeography, 50:1037–1048.
- Jiménez, L., & Soberón, J. (2022). Estimating the fundamental niche: accounting for the uneven availability of existing climates in the calibration area. Ecological Modelling, 464:109823.
- Nava-Bolaños, A., Prieto-Torres, D., Osorio-Olvera, L., & Soberón, J. (2023). Critical areas for pollinator conservation in Mexico. Biological Conservation, 283:e110119.
- Sarukhán, J., Urquiza-Haas, T., Koleff, P., Carabias, J., Dirzo, R., Ezcurra, E., Cerdeira-Estrada, S., & Soberón, J. (2015). Strategic actions to value, conserve, and restore the natural capital of megadiversity countries: the case of Mexico. BioScience, 65(2):164–173.
- Soberón, J., & Peterson, A. T. (2015). Biodiversity Governance: A Tower of Babel of Scales and Cultures. PLOS Biology, 13(3):e1002108.
- Lira-Noriega, A., & Soberón, J. (2014). The relationship among biodiversity, governance, wealth and scientific capacity at a country level: disaggregation and prioritization. Ambio, 44(5):391–400.
