= Henrique Marques =

Henrique Marques may refer to:

- Henrique Marques (fencer)
- Henrique Marques (taekwondo)
