= Enrique Márquez Jaramillo =

Mexican politician, poet and historian

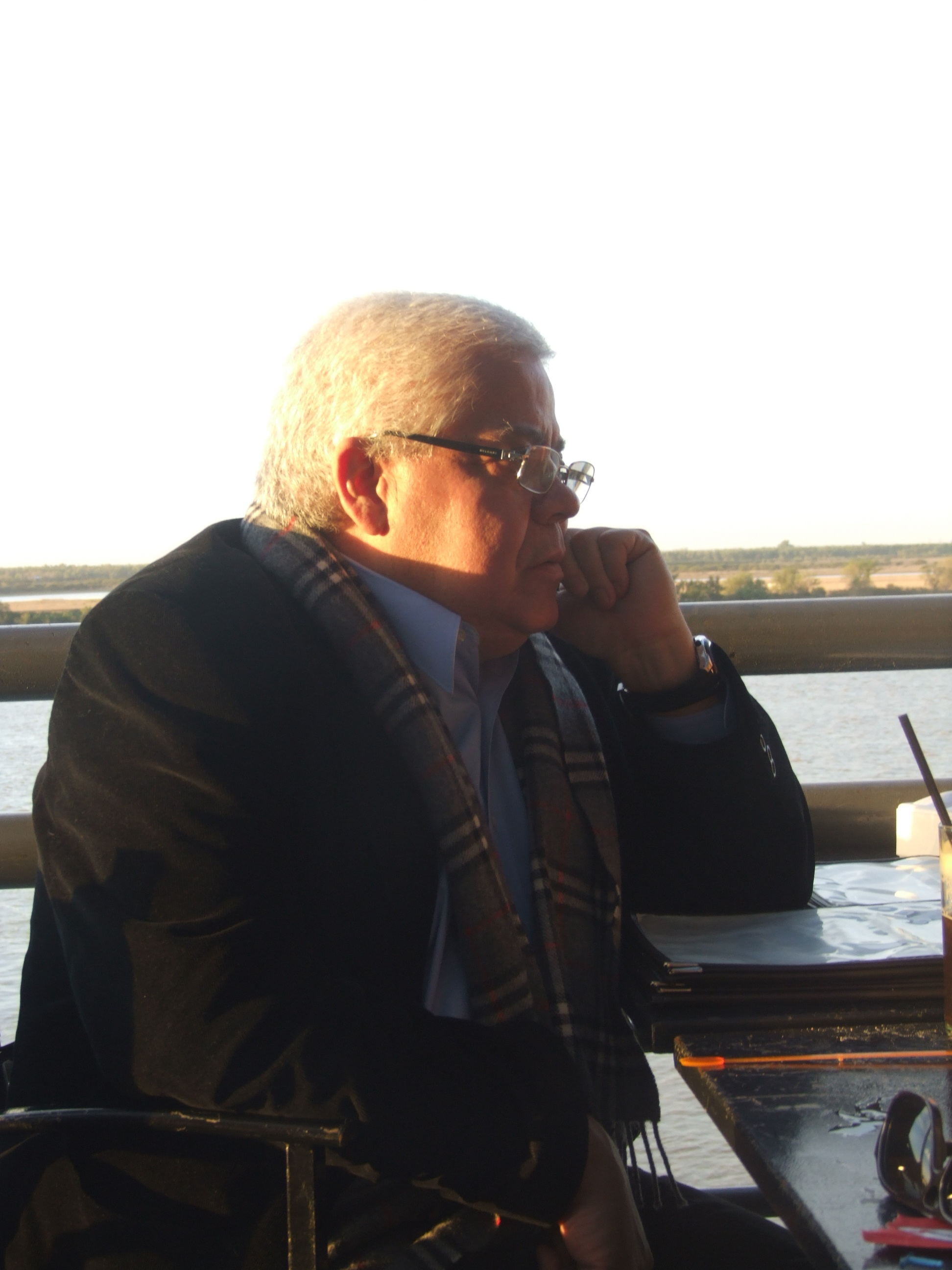
- Born: March 4, 1950; San Luis Potosí, Mexico
- Occupations: Poet, historian and politician

Enrique Márquez Jaramillo (San Luis Potosí, March 4, 1950), known in Mexico and abroad as Enrique Márquez, is a poet, historian and Mexican politician. In early 1994 Márquez participated in the Commission for Peace and Reconciliation in the southeastern Mexican state of Chiapas, with a focus on the Zapatista Army of National Liberation (Ejército Zapatista de Liberación Nacional, EZLN) uprising. From 2007 to 2010, he organized the bicentennial independence anniversary and Mexican Revolution centennial celebrations in Mexico City. At the end of 2012, Márquez convened the World Summit of Outraged Dissidents and Insurgents in the city.

== Biography ==
Márquez was born on March 4, 1950, in the north-central state of San Luis Potosí on the Mexican Plateau, and was educated at the #10 Damián Carmona boarding school. He studied law from 1969 to 1974 at the Universidad Autónoma de San Luis Potosí. To finance his studies, Márquez was a factory worker in Chicago.

== Literary career ==
In San Luis Potosí, Márquez was a member of the Manuel José Othón Literary Society (1967) and published his first poems in its periodicals. In the Literary Workshop of the House of Culture, he collaborated with Ecuadorian writer Miguel Donoso Pareja in 1973 with poets and storytellers such as Juan Villoro, David Ojeda, José Ignacio Betancourt, José de Jesús Sampedro, Roberto Bolaño and Mario Santiago Papasquiaro.

During the first half of the 1970s, Márquez promoted Mexican poetry and world literature in México. In 1973 he taught a course at the University of Panamá on contemporary Mexican poets, participating in several readings with Mexican writers from that country. This resulted in The Gorillas Nap, an anthology by young Panamanian poets published by Potosin Words magazine.

In 1971, interested in a new generation of Spanish poets including Vicente Molina Foix, Leopoldo María Panero, Ana María Moix and Manuel Vázquez Montalbán, Márquez prepared an anthology of poems by Vázquez Montalbán for Potosin Words. More than two decades later, reviewing his book Marcos: the Lord of Mirrors (an interview with the leader of EZLN, the Zapatista Army of National Liberation) in Barcelona, Márquez and Vázquez Montalbán conversed about the Chiapas conflict and the Catalan writer was surprised that his poetry attracted interest in a Mexican province so long ago.

During the 1970s Márquez collaborated with the magazine Change, directed by Julio Cortázar, Miguel Donoso Pareja, Pedro Orgambide, Juan Rulfo and José Revueltas, and Carlos Monsiváis's supplement The Culture in Mexico. In 1975, shortly after moving to Mexico City, he received a National Award for Young Poetry from the Instituto Nacional de Bellas Artes y Literatura. In 1976–77 Márquez received a scholarship from the Instituto which enabled him to write his second book of poetry (published in 1979), Liturgy of the Rooster in Three Feet. When Monsiváis republished his anthology, Mexican Poetry of the Twentieth Century (Mexico, Editorial Enterprises, 1966), in 1979 he included Márquez in the new edition with Alberto Blanco, Ricardo Castillo, Kyra Galván, David Huerta and Jaime Reyes.

== Academic career ==
Márquez attended El Colegio de México from 1975 to 1977 receiving a master's degree in political science from its Center for International Studies. He received a doctorate in history from the University of Perpignan in France. Márquez conducted a wide-ranging study of the political and social history of 19th- and 20th-century San Luis Potosí, analyzing the power wielded by Gonzalo N. Santos and his family in the Huasteca region from 1806 to 1978. The first result of his research was his master’s thesis, "House of the Holy Lords: Caciques in the Potosin Huasteca 1876-1910", whose hypothesis of the origins of the Mexican Revolution influenced Mexican historians Romana Falcón, Jean Meyer, Alan Knight, Wil Pansers, Claudio Lomnitz, Guy P.C. Thomson, Antonio Escobar and Carlos Monsiváis. During the 1980s Márquez studied Mexican social liberal Ponciano Arriaga, publishing a five-volume Complete Works of Ponciano Arriaga with María Isabel Abella.

Márquez has contributed to the Institute of Humanistic Research of the Autonomous University of San Luis Potosí (1984) and the College of San Luis (1997). He has been a professor and researcher in the Department of Sociology at the Metropolitan Autonomous University-Azcapotzalco, the Institute of Social Research of the Mexican Autonomous University, the Center of International Studies of the College of Mexico and the Department of Social Sciences of the Universidad Iberoamericana.

== Political career ==
During Márquez' late-1960s and early-1970s university years in his native state, he became politically active. He was a student representative to the university’s Directive Council, a presidential candidate for the student federation and a member of the law school's strike committee. At age 20, Márquez was chief of public services in the San Luis Potosí town hall and dealt with a two-month water shortage stemming from a 1974 drought.

In Mexico City from 1981 to 1994 and politically unaffiliated, Márquez was an advisor to Manuel Camacho Solís, undersecretary for regional development, programming and budget and secretary for exterior liaisons of the Commission of Peace and Reconciliation in Chiapas. At that time he was asked to participate in political and social projects such as the reconstruction of Mexico City after its 1985 earthquake and drafting Mexico's first environmental law and the constitution of the National Human Rights Commission. In late 1991, at the request of civic leader Salvador Nava Martínez, Márquez mediated post-election conflict in San Luis Potosí. On April 22, 1991, he went to Stockholm to participate in the International Socialist Summit presided by former German chancellor Willy Brandt, discussing the Stockholm Initiative about Global Security and Governance which would conclude in 1995.

Influenced by Márquez's writing about the history of 19th-century Mexican social liberalism, Carlos Salinas de Gortari labeled his neoliberal project social liberalism. In his book, The National Disagreement, Manuel Camacho Solís wrote: "Carlos Salinas would name his neoliberal project as Social Liberalism in a speech pronounced at the PRI (Institutional Revolutionary Party; March 4, 1992) based on writings by Enrique Márquez. Enrique, who was my adviser in Mexico City, knew and admired the thinking of the great liberal of the nineteenth century, Ponciano Arriaga, whose complete work he compiled and published in five volumes in that year. That was where the term used by Carlos Salinas came from, although its content had nothing to do with its original author, who fought until the end of his life in favor of justice and freedom".

In November 1993, Márquez experienced the crisis of presidential succession which pitted Camacho Solís against Salinas de Gortari and his staff for the support of candidate Luis Donaldo Colosio. When the EZLN insurgency began, Camacho led the peace commission which politicized the Chiapas conflict. From January to March 1995 Márquez was a political adviser in activities leading to a ceasefire and amnesty Law and, later, to the Dialogues of Peace in San Cristóbal with the EZLN. In his book, Why Camacho Lost: Revelations by the Advisor to Manuel Camacho Solís (Mexico, Océano Publishing House, 1995), he described his experiences. In 1999, while teaching political sociology at the Universidad Iberoamericana, Márquez collaborated on the new Milenio Daily. He published a daily column, "Journal of Decadence", criticizing democracy in Mexico.

== Bi100 Commission of Mexico City ==
In April 2007 Mexico City mayor Marcelo Ebrard appointed Márquez coordinator of the Commission for the Bicentennial of Independence and Centennial of the Revolution in Mexico City, a position he held until the end of 2010. Separate from the federal commission but created for the same purpose, the Commission of Mexico City (better known as Bi100 Commission) had a budget two percent that of the federal commission. In less than three years, the federal commission had five coordinators and questions were raised about transparency and resource allocation. Because of this, the Bi100 Commission created a local, national and international program.

In the middle of 2007, when Márquez began his work, the federal commission began a debate with historians such as Javier García Diego, Enrique Krauze, Guillermo Tovar y de Teresa, Álvaro Matute and Alejandro Rosas and PRI politicians such as Jesús Murillo Karam, Francisco Labastida and Josefina VázquezMota.

Márquez spent his years on the Bi100 Commission working to promote Mexico City in Latin America and worldwide. The multimedia exhibit "Mexico City, Solidarity City, Refuge City", describing how the capital of Mexico became a haven for refugees from European and South American fascism. The exhibition was taken to Madrid, Oxford, Cádiz, Rosario, Argentina, and Montevideo. The Expedition 1808: A Journey Across the Iberoamerican Bicentennial, a 13-episode TV series produced by Bi100, was broadcast in 22 Latin American countries by the National Geographic Channel in 2009. In 2010 and 2011 it was rebroadcast on the Spanish public RTVE network to nearly 150 countries on five continents, totaling almost 1,300 hours of airtime.

== Year of Mexico in France ==
At the end of the national celebration, Márquez was appointed by Ebrard to organize the activities in which Mexico City would participate in 2011, the year dedicated by the French government to Mexico. Weeks after a diplomatic row led to the event's cancellation, the city government channeled part of the already-allocated resources into a cultural program entitled "Mexico City and Cervantes". The celebration included literary, musical and film activities in Madrid, Paris, Bordeaux, Rome and Cologne.

== World Summit of Outraged, Dissidents and Insurgents ==
Márquez coordinated a December 7–10, 2012 World Summit of Outraged, Dissidents and Insurgents, inviting social-network activists from the Arab Spring in Morocco, Tunisia, Libya, Syria and Egypt and representatives of the Outraged movement from Spain, the United States, Chile, Mexico and Greece. In attendance were Mexican writers Paco Ignacio Taibo II, Genaro Villamil and Fabrizio Mejía.

== Work ==
=== Poetry ===
- Bouncing a Red Ball, San Luis Potosí, Tepeyac Publishing House, 1969.
- Liturgy of the Rooster in Three Feet, Mexico, INBAL/Tierra Adentro, 1979.
- In the Same Bogie Without Sea, Mexico, Praxis/Dos Filos Publishing House, Zacatecas, 1982.
- In the Sewer of the World Uyuyuy, The Culture in Mexico Magazine, 1982.
- Loves, Mexico, Verde Halago Publishing House, 1995.
- Poems to the ones from the Sun, Mexico, Verde Halago Publishing House, 1995.

=== Featured in anthologies ===
- Young Poetry of Mexico, Mexico, Cultural Communication UNAM/National Institute of Fine Arts and Literacy, 1975.
- Miguel Donoso Pareja, Young Poets of Mexico, Mexico, Change Magazine #1, 1975.
- Rogelio Carbajal, Summa of Young Poetry, Mexico, Versus Magazine, 1977.
- Carlos Monsiváis, Mexican Poetry of the twentieth century, Mexico, Promexa Publishing House, 1979.
- University of Perpignan, Department of Spanish, Encounter of Young Latin-American Poets, Perpignan (France), Ventanal Magazine, Winter of 1981.
- Enrique Jaramillo Levy, Erotic Mexican Poetry, 1880-1980, Mexico, Domés Publishing House, 1982.
- David Ojeda, Potosin Literacy. Four hundred Years, San Luis Potosí, Ponciano Arriaga Publishing House, 1992.

=== Author of anthologies ===
- The Whole Destiny on Foot, Show of Young Mexican Poets and Storytellers, in Etudes Mexicaines 3, Université of Perpignan, France, 1980, Number 3.
- New Spanish Literacy: Poems by Mauel Vázquez Montalban, Potosin Letters, 1975, Number 202.

=== Art ===
- Code/Contemporary art and culture form Mexico City. Editor, with Ricardo Porrero, México, Bi100 Commission, 2010.
- Door 1808 by Manuel Felguérez (with two impressions by the artist).Edition and presentation. Mexico, Cultural Center Indianilla, 2009.

=== History ===
- The Poor Prosecutors of Ponciano Arriaga, San Luis Potosí, Law School, Autonomous University of San Luis Potosí, 1983.
- Antonio Díaz Soto and Gama and the Municipality in the Liberal Convention of 1901, San Luis Potosí, Law School, Autonomous University of San Luis Potosí, 1984.
- Land, Clans and Politics in the Potosin Huasteca (1797-1843), Mexican Magazine of Sociology, UNAM, 1986.
- San Luis Potosí: Texts of its History, México, Institute of Research Dr. José María Luis Mora, 1987.
- Complete Work of Ponciano Arriaga (research, editing and introductory studies) in collaboration with María Isabel Abella, México, Institute of Juridical Research UNAM, 1992, 5 volumes.
- Posthumous Memoir of Francisco Primo de Verdad and Ramos, Syndic of the City Hall of Mexico 1808, (Research, editing and introduction), México, Government of Mexico City, Bi100 Commission, 2007.
- Hundred centennials of Mexico City, editing and introduction, México, Government of Mexico City, 2010.
- Mexico City and Cádiz, 1810-1823: In Search of Constitutional Sovereignty, Editing and introduction, México, 20/10, 2009.
- The Independence in Mexico City, editor, Mexico, Obsidian Mirror, 2010.
- The Revolution in Mexico City, editor, Mexico city, Obsidian Mirror, 2010.

==== As participating author ====
- After the Estates (The disintegration of the Great Agrarian Property in Mexico), with Francois Chevalier, Jan Bazant, Andrés Lira, Friedrich Katz and others. Mexico, College of Michoacán, 1982.
- The division of the Lands of Felipe Barragán in the Orient of San Luis Potosí, 1797-1905, with Horacio Sánchez Unzueta, San Luis Potosí, Academy of Potosin History, 1984.
- Statesmen, Warlords and Chieftains, with Carlos Martínez Assad and others, México, UNAM, Institute of Social Research, 1988.

=== Politics ===
- Why did Camacho lost: Revelations of the adviser of Manuel Camacho Solís, Mexico, Ocean Publishing House, 1995.
- Brief Dictionary for Enraged Mexicans, Mexico, Ocean Publishing House, 1996.
- Politic Misery of Our Time, Mexico, Ocean Publishing House, 1999.

==== As participating author ====
- Politic Mexican Life in the Crisis, with Soledad Loaeza, Rafael Segovia, Carlos Martínez Assad and others, México, El Colegio de México, 1987.
- Electoral Patterns and Perspectives in Mexico, with Arturo Alvarado, Juan Molinar Horcasita, Jeffrey W. Rubin, Alberto Aziz Nassif and others, University of California, San Diego, Center for US-Mexican Studies, 1987.
- Currently in Juárez, with Juan Ramón de la Fuente, Manuel Camacho Solís, Andrés Manuel López Obrador, Ifigenia Martínez, Marcelo Ebrard and others, Mexico, National Autonomous Mexican University, 2004.
- Democratic Governance: What Reform?, with Diego Valadés, Lorenzo Meyer, Juan Ramón de la Fuente, Víctor Flores Olea, Héctor Aguilar Camín, Adolfo Aguilar Zínser and others, Mexico, Institute of Juridical Research of the National Autonomous Mexican University/Chamber of Deputies LIX Legislature- Special Commission for the Reform of the State, 2004.

== Work as cultural producer ==
=== Urban art ===
- Door Sculpture 1808, by Manuel Felguérez, in Juarez Avenue and Reforma, Mexico City, Bi100 Commission/Cultural Center Indianilla (2007).
- Fountain of the Republic, by Manuel Felguérez, in Juarez Avenue and Reforma, Mexico City, Bi100 Commission/Cultural Center Indianilla (2007).
- Impression of the Bicentennial of Independence, 1 300 m. Mexico City, Bi100 Commission/Cultural Center Indianilla.

=== Cinema ===
==== Films ====
- Madero is Dead, Live Memoir, by Juan Carlos Rulfo. Bi100 Commission/ Half Moon Productions (2009).
- Hell, by Luis Estrada. Bi100 Commission/Bandido Films (2010).
- The Attack, by Jorge Fons. Bi100 Commission /Alebrije Productions (2010).

==== Medium and short films ====
- 1808, by Miguel Necoechea, Bi100 Commission/Ivania Films (2007).
- X Women, by Patricia Arriaga, Bi100 Commission/Nao Films (2007).
- The Priest, the Kid and the Blind Man, by Pablo Aura, Bi100 Commission/Burumbio Productions (2008).
- Carlos Fuentes and Mexico City, by Ezequiel Malbergier, Bi100 Commission/The Hydrogen Lantern (2008)
- Me Álvaro, the Ghost of the Bombilla, by Miguel Necoechea, Bi100 Commission/Ivania Films (2008).
- The Transhumants, by Francisco Cecetti. Bi100 Commission/CUEC-UNAM (2009).

=== Television ===
==== Series ====
- Expedition 1808/A Journey through the Bicentennials of Iberoamerica, Bi100 Commission/Nao Films (2008).
- Minimum History of Mexico, Bi100 Commission/TV-UNAM (2009).
- 100 X 100 REVO, Bi100 Commission/TV-UNAM (2010).
- Shock Art, Bi100 Commission/TV-UNAM (2010).
- The Bicentennial to the Couch: Mexico in Therapy, Bi100 Commission/Mexican Psychoanalytical Association/TV-UNAM (2010).
- Hundred Centennials of Mexico City, Bi100 Commission/TV-UNAM (2010).

=== Technology projects ===
- Digital Village, Bi100 Commission/OCESA (2009).
- MX Heroes Series, electronic games for the teaching of Mexico’s History. Bi100 Commission/Sietemedia Productions.
- Miguel Hidalgo, educational robot, Bi100 Commission/Animatronics (2010).

=== Music ===
==== Research and preservation of folkloric Mexican music ====
- If Juárez hadn’t died..., by Óscar Chávez, Bi100 Commission/Martha de Cea (2009).

==== Music and gender, popular divulgation ====
- The Corregidoras take the City, concerts in urban buses in Mexico City, with Ely Guerra, Natalia Lafourcade, Susana Zabaleta, Aurora and the Academia, Regina Orozco and Amandititita, Bi100 Commission/Artistic Consequences, S.A.

== Awards and distinctions ==
- National Award of Young Poetry 1975, National Institute of Fine Arts.
- Scholarship by the College of Mexico, 1975-1977.
- Scholarship of Literacy 1976 by the National Institute of Fine Arts.
- Scholarship by the National Council of Science and Technology, 1979-1982.
- Cristal Screen Award 2007 for the production of X Women, by Patricia Arriaga, as best digital film.
- Election as one of the 300 leaders in Mexico, 2009. 100
- National Award of Journalism of Science and Cultural Popularization 2009, shared with TV-UNAM, for the production of the series Minimum History of Mexico.
- National Award of Journalism of Science and Cultural Popularization 2009, shared with TV-UNAM, for the production of the series The Bicentennial to the Couch: Mexico in Therapy.
