= LGEEPA =

Mexican environmental protection legislation

The General Law of Ecological Equilibrium and Environmental Protection (Ley General del Equilibrio Ecológico y la Protección al Ambiente, or LGEEPA in Spanish) is an important piece of Mexican environmental protection legislation passed in March 1988 that defines the framework for all environmental law in Mexico.
