= Protected natural areas of Mexico =

Protected land in Mexico

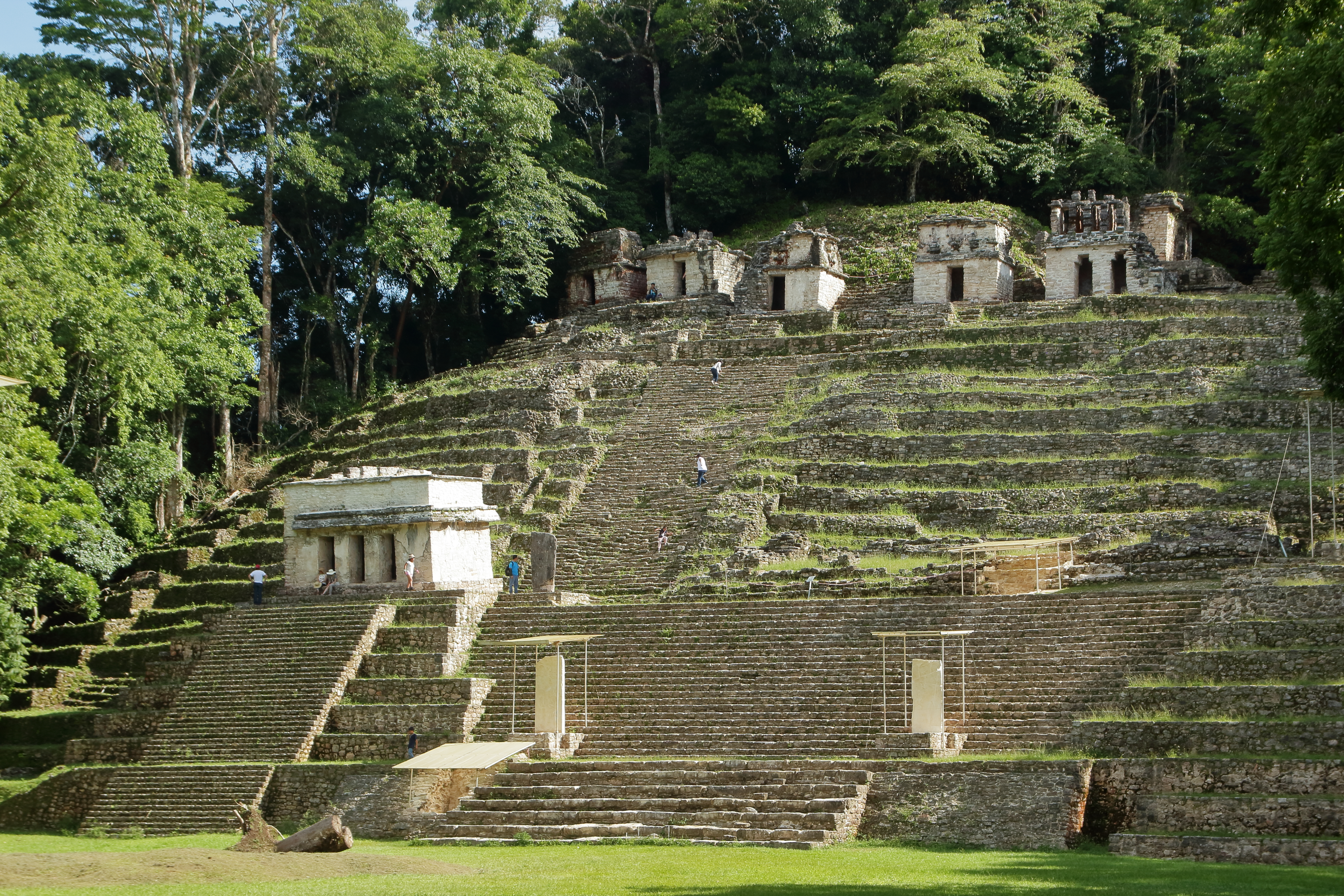
Bonampak is an ancient Maya archaeological site in the Mexican state of Chiapas, and is a natural monument.

There are currently 232 Protected Natural Areas in Mexico, covering 98 million hectares in total. They are protected and administered by the National Commission of Protected Natural Areas (Comisión Nacional de Áreas Naturales Protegidas, or 'CONANP'), a federal agency under the Secretariat of Environment and Natural Resources (SEMARNAT). CONANP administers:

- 79 Mexican National Parks
- 48 biosphere reserves
- 57 flora and fauna protection areas
- 28 Mexican Nature Sanctuaries
- 15 natural resources protection areas
- 5 natural monuments

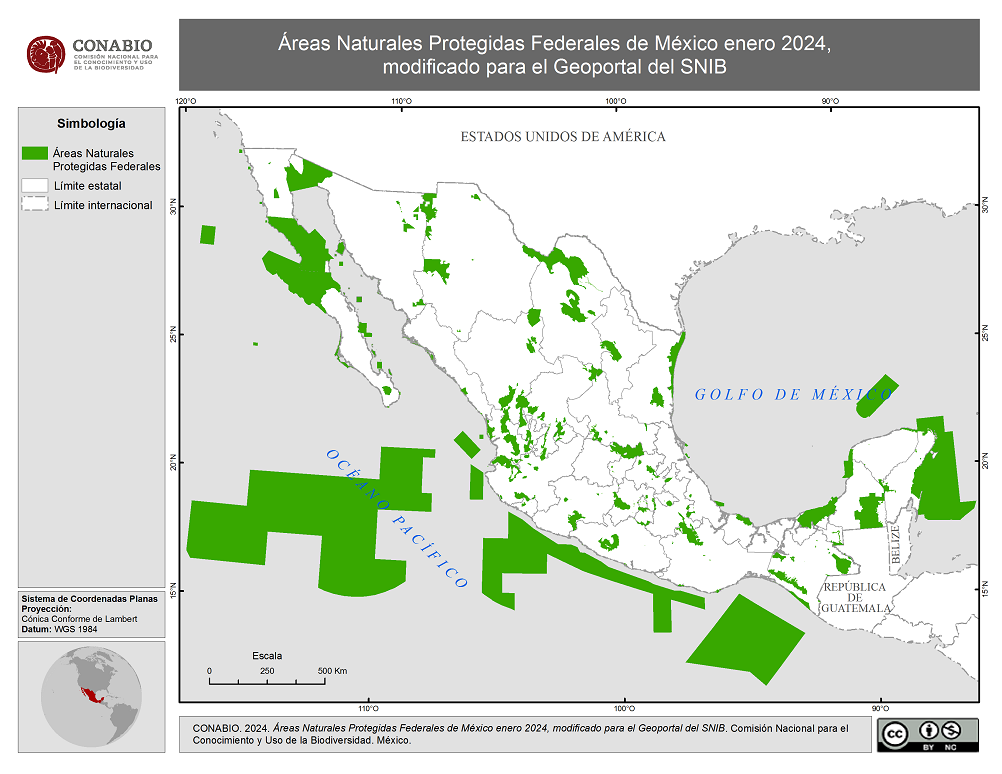
Federal Natural Protected Areas of Mexico, January 2024

== History ==
In 1988, the Congress of the Union passed LGEEPA, which provides the government's modern framework for environmental protection law. However, the law only outlined some of the protection categories, with SEMARNAT creating separate ones in cases like the Tutuaca Flora and Fauna Protection Area, which formed in 2001 as a merger between the Tutuaca National Forest Reserve and Wildlife Refuge Zone.

== CONANP presidents ==
- 2001–2010: Ernesto Enkerlin
- 7 October 2024–: Pedro Álvarez Icaza Longoria

== See also ==
- Comisión Nacional para el Conocimiento y Uso de la Biodiversidad
