= Comisión Nacional para el Conocimiento y Uso de la Biodiversidad =

Mexican government biodiversity commission

CONABIO
- Comisión Nacional para el Conocimiento y Uso de la Biodiversidad

Agency overview
- Formed: March 16, 1992
- Jurisdiction: Federal Government of Mexico
- Headquarters: Liga Periférico Sur, Núm 4903, Col. Parques del Pedregal, Tlalpan, CP 14010 Mexico D.F. Tel. (55) 5004.5000
- Ministers responsible: Claudia Sheinbaum Pardo, Constitutional President of Mexico; Alicia Barcena, Secretariat of Environment and Natural Resources (SEMARNAT); Technical Secretary of CONABIO
- Agency executive: Dr. José Sarukhán Kermez, National Coordinator
- Website: www.conabio.gob.mx

The Comisión Nacional para el Conocimiento y Uso de la Biodiversidad (CONABIO; English: National Commission for the Knowledge and Use of Biodiversity) is a permanent inter-ministerial commission of the Federal Mexican government, created in 1992. It has the primary purpose of coordinating, supporting and executing activities and projects designed to foment understanding of biodiversity within Mexico and the surrounding region. As a governmental agency, CONABIO produces and collates biodiversity data and assessments across Mexico's varied ecosystems. It also either administers or guides a range of biological conservation and sustainability projects with the intention of securing benefits to Mexican society as a whole.

The mission of CONABIO is to promote, coordinate, support and carry out activities aimed at increasing awareness of biodiversity and its conservation and sustainable use for the benefit of society. Conabio was conceived as an applied research organization, sponsoring basic research that generates and compiles biodiversity information, developing capacity in the area of biodiversity informatics, and to act as a publicly accessible source of information and knowledge.

CONABIO is an advisory institution that compiles and organizes information on the biodiversity of Mexico. As such, it has no responsibility on enforcing law, only on advising the different levels of government of Mexico, and the public, on issues related to the biodiversity of the country.

Among the main functions of CONABIO are to implement and operate the National Information System on Biodiversity, as required by article 80, section V of the General Law of Ecological Equilibrium and Environmental Protection. CONABIO provides data, information and advice to various users and implements the national and global biodiversity information networks, complying with international commitments on biodiversity entered into by Mexico, and carries out actions directed towards conservation and sustainable use of biodiversity in Mexico.

The President of the commission is the head of the Federal Executive, Claudia Sheinbaum Pardo. The Technical Secretary is the head of the Secretariat of Environment and Natural Resources, Alicia Barcena and the heads of the following secretariats also participate: Agriculture, Livestock, Rural Development, Fisheries and Food; Social Development; Economy; Public Education; Energy; Finance and Public Credit; Foreign Affairs; Health; and Tourism.

CONABIO performs its functions via an operative group that, since its inception, has been led by José Sarukhán Kermez as National Coordinator, and from 1992 to 2005 by Jorge L. Soberón as executive secretary. As of November 2024, Raul Jimenez is the executive secretary.

CONABIO maintains Mexico's national restoration-information system, the Sistema Nacional de Información para la Restauración Ambiental (SNIRA), and its geospatial interface (HG‑SNIRA). Media coverage of the HG‑SNIRA launch described the platform as compiling information from more than 4,500 restoration projects and enabling consultation of more than 50 national-scale geospatial layers; the same coverage identified the Restauración de Paisajes Emblemáticos initiative promoted by Conservation International Mexico and partners in Oaxaca and Chiapas among the documented restoration efforts.

== See also ==
- 1992 in the environment
