= El Potosí National Park =

Protected area in northwestern Mexico

- IUCN category II (national park)
- Location within Mexico
- Location: San Luis Potosí, Mexico
- Nearest city: Rioverde, San Luis Potosí
- Coordinates: 21°54′16″N 100°20′14″W
- Area: 20 km^{2} (7.7 sq mi)
- Designation: National park
- Designated: 1936
- Administrator: National Commission of Natural Protected Areas

El Potosí National Park is a protected area in northwestern Mexico. It is located in San Luis Potosí.It has an area of 20 km^{2}.

The park was established in 1936 by president Lázaro Cárdenas.

== Geography ==
The park is located in the Serrania de Rioverde, part of the Sierra Madre Oriental. It is west of the city of Rioverde.

The terrain is rugged and often steep, ranging from 1,500 to 2,480 meters elevation. El Cuatesoncito is the highest peak in the park.

The park is in the watershed of the Río Verde, a tributary of the Panuco River. The park's forests are important to the hydrology of the region, helping moderate rainfall runoff and protect water quality.

== Climate ==
The climate is mostly montane and semi-arid, with an annual average temperature between 12 and 18 °C. Temperatures in the coldest month range from -3 to 18 °C, and the temperature in the hottest month is less than 22 °C. The western portion of the park is generally warmer, with an average annual temperature between 18 and 22 °C.

Rainfall is heaviest in the summer months. Atlantic hurricanes occasionally come ashore from the Gulf of Mexico, bringing intense rain and causing flooding in the region.

The park experienced a severe drought from 2010 to 2012.

== Flora and fauna ==
The predominant plant community is pine–oak forest.

285 species of wild plants, classed in 207 genera and 84 families, are found in the park. Characteristic tree species include oaks (Quercus resinosa, Quercus potosina, and Quercus laeta), pines (Pinus pseudostrobus and Pinus teocote), madroño (Arbutus xalapensis, lantrisco (Rhus virens), bodero (Dodonaea viscosa), and laurel (Litsea schaffneri). Other characteristic plants include yerbanís (Tagetes lucida), acedia (Ageratum corymbosum) carrestolianda (Senecio aschenbornianus), and calaguala (Polypodium aureum). Three locally-occurring species are accorded special protection by the government – Ferocactus histrix, a cactus locally known as borrachitas biznaga, the orchid Laelia speciosa, known as laelia de mayo or mayito, and the cycad Ceratozamia zaragozae, locally known as palmita.

The drought of 2010–2012 weakened many trees, making them vulnerable to pine bark beetles (Dendroctonus sp.) Many pine trees, especially young ones, died, particularly in the northern and southern portions of the park.
