= Volcán Nevado de Colima National Park =

National park in Mexico

- IUCN category II (national park)
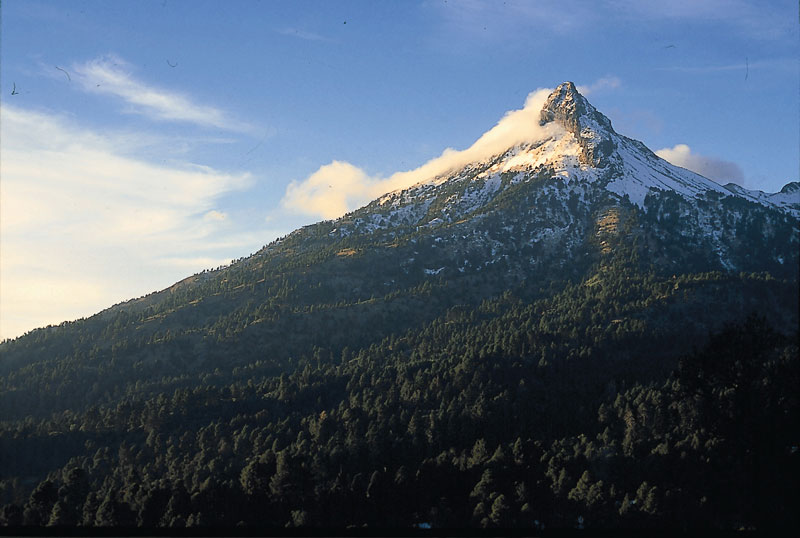

- Location within Mexico
- Interactive map of Volcán Nevado de Colima National Park
- Location: Colima and Jalisco, Mexico
- Coordinates: 19°33′N 103°37′W
- Area: 65.55 km^{2} (25.31 sq mi)
- Designation: National park
- Designated: 1940
- Governing body: National Commission of Natural Protected Areas

Volcán Nevado de Colima National Park is a national park in western Mexico. It protects the upper slopes of two volcanic mountains, Volcán de Colima and Nevado de Colima, in the states of Jalisco and Colima.

== Geography ==
The park covers an area of 65.55 km^{2}, and covers the upper slopes of two adjacent volcanic mountains, Nevado de Colima (4330 m) and Volcán de Colima (3958 m), also known as Volcán de Fuego. The park boundary follows the 3200-meter contour. Nevado de Colima is older and inactive. Volcán de Fuego is Mexico's most active volcano.

The park adjoins El Jabalí Flora and Fauna Protection Area on the southwest. Bosque Mesófilo Nevado de Colima State Park in Jalisco is composed of four separate enclaves which adjoin the national park on the east and west flanks of the two peaks.

== Flora and fauna ==
Plant communities include high-elevation pine forests, and subalpine grassland, called zacatonal, at the highest elevations.

Native mammals include white-tailed deer (Odocoileus virginianus), puma (Puma concolor), coyote (Canis latrans), and collared peccary (Pecari tajacu).

102 species of birds have been recorded in the park, including the long-tailed wood partridge (Dendrortyx macroura), white-striped woodcreeper (Lepidocolaptes leucogaster), russet nightingale-thrush (Catharus occidentalis), brown-backed solitaire (Myadestes occidentalis), gray silky-flycatcher (Ptiliogonys cinereus), chestnut-sided shrike-vireo (Vireolanius melitophrys), golden-browed warbler (Basileuterus belli), red warbler (Cardellina rubra), crescent-chested warbler (Oreothlypis superciliosa), rufous-capped brushfinch (Atlapetes pileatus), green-striped brushfinch (Arremon virenticeps), and collared towhee (Pipilo ocai).
