= Cerro de Garnica National Park =

National park in Michoacán state of central Mexico

- IUCN category II (national park)
- Location within Mexico
- Location: Michoacán, Mexico
- Coordinates: 19°42′N 100°51′W
- Area: 19.36 km^{2} (7.47 sq mi)
- Designation: National park
- Designated: 1936
- Administrator: National Commission of Natural Protected Areas

Cerro de Garnica National Park is a national park in Michoacán state of central Mexico. It protects 19.36 km^{2} in the mountains of the Trans-Mexican Volcanic Belt.

== Geography ==
Cerro de Garnica National Park is located 58 km east of Morelia, in the municipalities of Ciudad Hidalgo and Queréndaro. It is in a portion of the Trans-Mexican Volcanic Belt known as the Sierra de Mil Cumbres or Sierra de Otzumatlán. The park covers mountain peaks and intermountain valleys, with elevations ranging from 1840 to 3000 meters elevation. Small surface streams drain the park including El Venado, a tributary of the Chinapa River.

== Climate ==
The climate is temperate and subhumid, with a mean annual temperature of 15 C. Mean annual rainfall ranges from 1200 to 1400 mm.

== Flora and fauna ==
The park is in the Trans-Mexican Volcanic Belt pine–oak forests ecoregion, and plant communities in the include pine forests, oak forests, pine–oak forests, and fir forests.

172 birds species of birds have been recorded in the park, including the dusky hummingbird (Phaeoptila sordida), bumblebee hummingbird (Selasphorus heloisa), white-striped woodcreeper (Lepidocolaptes leucogaster), pine flycatcher (Empidonax affinis), gray-collared becard (Pachyramphus major), gray-barred wren (Campylorhynchus megalopterus), spotted wren (Campylorhynchus gularis), russet nightingale-thrush (Catharus occidentalis), chestnut-sided shrike-vireo (Vireolanius melitophrys), golden-browed warbler (Basileuterus belli), green-striped brushfinch (Arremon virenticeps), and rusty-crowned ground sparrow (Melozone kieneri).

38 mammal species have been recorded in the park, including 22 species of bats. 18 reptile species and nine species of amphibians have also been recorded in the park.

Monarch butterflies (Danaus plexippus) migrate from the north to establish winter colonies in the area.

== Conservation ==
President Lázaro Cárdenas established the park by decree on 5 September 1936.
