= Cumbres de Majalca National Park =

National park in Chihuahua, Mexico

- IUCN category II (national park)
- Location within Mexico
- Location: Chihuahua, Mexico
- Nearest city: Chihuahua, Chihuahua
- Coordinates: 28°48′15″N 106°29′6″W
- Area: 4,772 ha (18.42 sq mi)
- Established: September 1, 1939
- Governing body: Secretariat of the Environment and Natural Resources

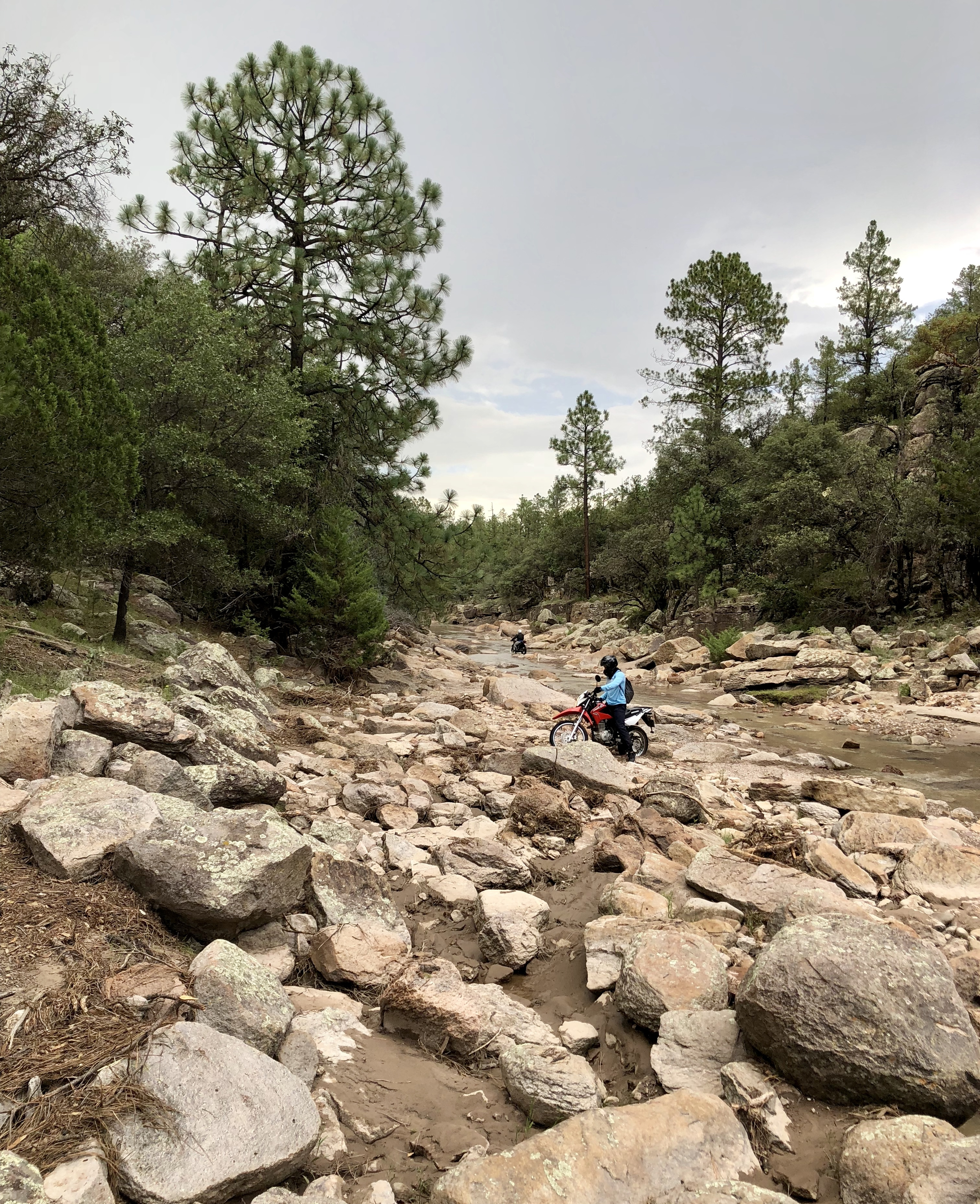
Activities that can be performed in Majalca National Park include dirt biking

The Cumbres de Majalca National Park is a national park in the Mexican state of Chihuahua located 88 km northwest of the city of Chihuahua. The park showcases extraordinary rock formations that have been shaped by wind and water erosion. The park was created by presidential decree in 1939 encompassing 4,772 hectares to protect the endemic flora and fauna. The park is characterized by pine and oak forest. It is also one of the few areas in Mexico that are inhabited by black bear.

The park is frequented by residents of the state capital city. The area is popular with rock climbers, hikers, and campers; there are 53 km of roads for hiking and mountain biking. Camping including backcountry camping is permitted and there are rental cabins available. Access to the park is by federal highway number 45 that goes from Chihuahua to Ciudad Juárez.

== History ==
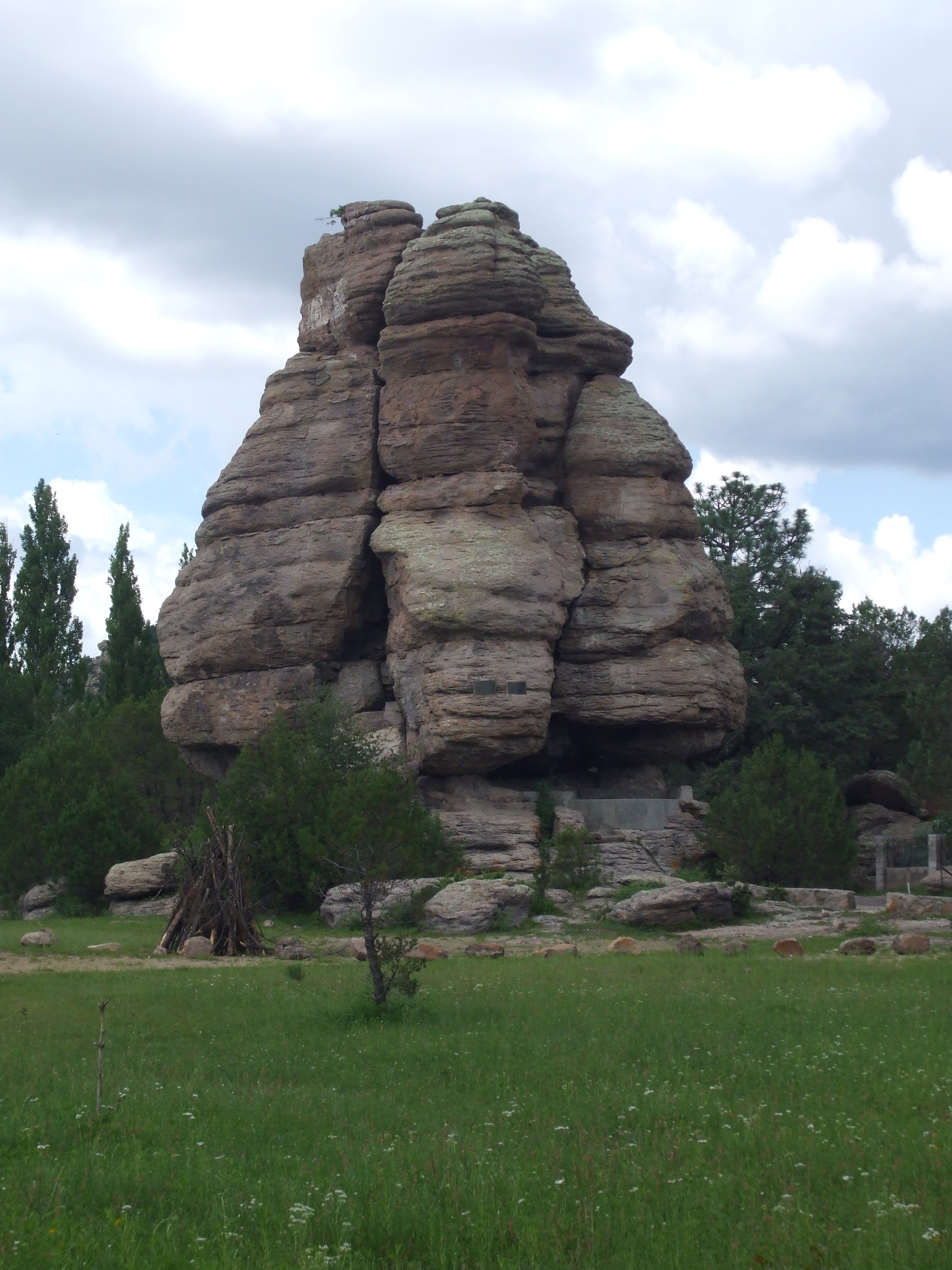
Peñón de El Cuadrado rock formation

The Cumbres de Majalca National Park was created by the federal government on September 1, 1939. The protected zone encompassed an area of 4,772 hectares (11,790 acres). The park was created to help preserve natural habitat for many species of animals and plants. After the creation of the national park during the mid 20th century, the park underwent a reforestation of different coniferous species.

== Geography ==
Cumbres de Majalca National Park is located in the central part of the state of Chihuahua near the city of Chihuahua. The park is found in the Sierra de Majalca mountain range a subdivision of the Sierra Madre Occidental. Mountain peaks in the park reach an elevation of 2,600 meters above sea level. The park is part of the dominant Transition Bavícora-Bustillos Transition which is characterized by many small elevated valleys surrounded by volcanic mountains. The mountains in the park are not of notable rank in the state, but the highest peaks in the park are: Cerro Las Escobas, Cerro La Puerta, Cerro Los Almíceres, and Cerro del Agua. The park is almost completely covered by volcanic rocks that have been shaped into amazing formations by wind and water erosion.

Sierra de Majalca is the point of origin of the Sacramento River that flows towards the state capital city. The Sacramento River empties into the Chuvíscar River before reaching Chihuahua.

== Climate ==
According to the Köppen climate classification, the park has two different climates. A (BSk) semiarid climate occurs in the lower elevations in the park where temperatures can reach 35 °C (95 °F) in the summer and temperatures fluctuate largely in the winter from cool to hot. The steppe zones in the park have a rainy season at the end of the summer and few winter snowfalls. A (Cwa) humid subtropical with hot summers and cold winters occur in the higher elevations where temperatures can fall to −10 °C (14 °F) in the winter and averages 112 days under 0 °C (32 °F). During the winter in the higher elevations, snowstorms come frequently increasing at the end of the season.

Climate data for Majalca (1951-2010, extremes 1951-present)
| Month | Jan | Feb | Mar | Apr | May | Jun | Jul | Aug | Sep | Oct | Nov | Dec | Year |
|---|---|---|---|---|---|---|---|---|---|---|---|---|---|
| Record high °C (°F) | 29.0 (84.2) | 28.0 (82.4) | 30.0 (86.0) | 33.0 (91.4) | 35.0 (95.0) | 36.0 (96.8) | 38.0 (100.4) | 34.0 (93.2) | 34.0 (93.2) | 32.0 (89.6) | 31.0 (87.8) | 29.0 (84.2) | 38.0 (100.4) |
| Mean daily maximum °C (°F) | 14.4 (57.9) | 15.6 (60.1) | 19.0 (66.2) | 22.2 (72.0) | 25.1 (77.2) | 27.9 (82.2) | 26.3 (79.3) | 25.0 (77.0) | 23.4 (74.1) | 21.7 (71.1) | 18.4 (65.1) | 15.6 (60.1) | 21.2 (70.2) |
| Daily mean °C (°F) | 4.8 (40.6) | 5.6 (42.1) | 9.0 (48.2) | 12.3 (54.1) | 15.4 (59.7) | 19.0 (66.2) | 18.8 (65.8) | 17.9 (64.2) | 16.0 (60.8) | 12.1 (53.8) | 8.2 (46.8) | 5.6 (42.1) | 12.1 (53.8) |
| Mean daily minimum °C (°F) | −4.7 (23.5) | −4.4 (24.1) | −1.0 (30.2) | 2.4 (36.3) | 5.7 (42.3) | 10.0 (50.0) | 11.2 (52.2) | 10.7 (51.3) | 8.5 (47.3) | 2.6 (36.7) | −2.0 (28.4) | −4.4 (24.1) | 2.9 (37.2) |
| Record low °C (°F) | −23.1 (−9.6) | −18.0 (−0.4) | −15.0 (5.0) | −9.0 (15.8) | −4.0 (24.8) | −1.0 (30.2) | 1.0 (33.8) | 4.0 (39.2) | −3.0 (26.6) | −10.0 (14.0) | −15.0 (5.0) | −16.0 (3.2) | −23.1 (−9.6) |
| Average precipitation mm (inches) | 14.2 (0.56) | 9.9 (0.39) | 9.2 (0.36) | 12.1 (0.48) | 22.8 (0.90) | 66.4 (2.61) | 151.7 (5.97) | 155.9 (6.14) | 125.5 (4.94) | 26.6 (1.05) | 14.8 (0.58) | 12.2 (0.48) | 621.3 (24.46) |
| Average precipitation days (≥ 0.1 mm) | 3.2 | 2.5 | 1.9 | 2.0 | 3.7 | 7.6 | 14.2 | 14.4 | 11.2 | 3.7 | 2.8 | 2.8 | 70.0 |
Source: Servicio Meteorologico Nacional

== Flora and fauna ==
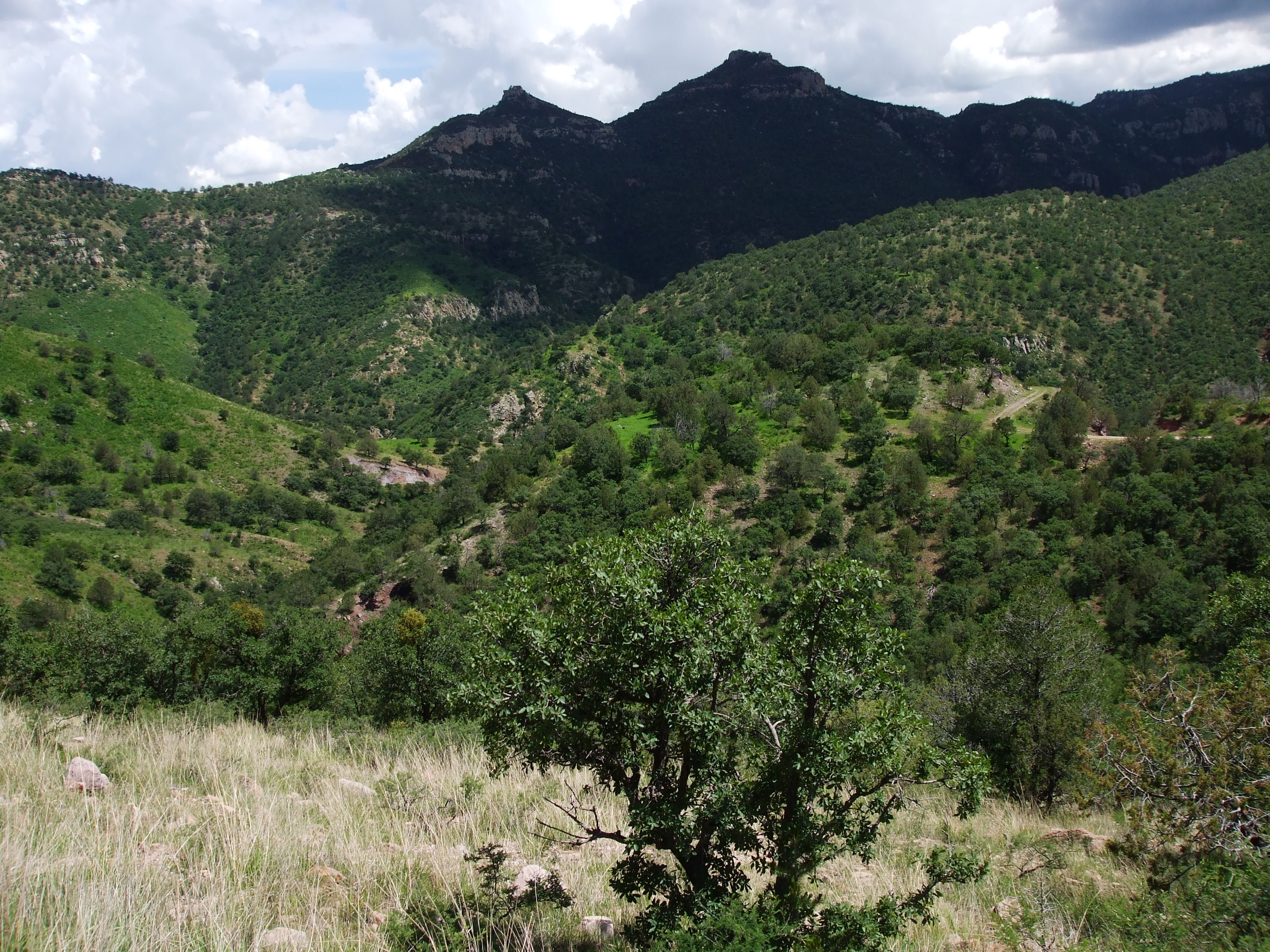
Sierra de Majalca

Pine forests are found from the high elevations to the transition zone between the mountains and the steppe. The main species of conifers found in the park are: Pinus leiophylla, Pinus cembroides, Pinus engelmannii, and several species of Abies. The lower elevations have a steppe vegetation with a variety of grasses and small bushes. Several species of Juniperus dot the steppe and the transition zone.

The park is part of a fragile ecosystem which includes a few endangered species like: American black bear and cougar. Other mammals that can be found in the park are: white-tailed deer, eastern cottontail, North American porcupine, bobcat, and coyote.

Few reptile species inhabit the lower elevations, mostly small lizards. One known reptile species is the northern Mexican pine snake (Pituophis deppei jani). The most common avian species observed in the park are peregrine falcon, golden eagle, wild turkey, common pheasant, Arizona woodpecker, Strickland's woodpecker, and ladder-backed woodpecker.

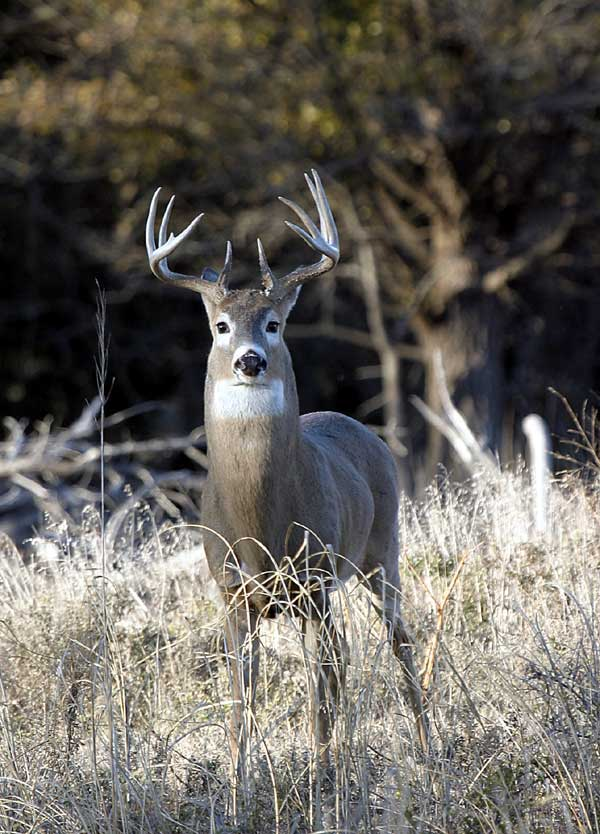
Odocoileus virginianus

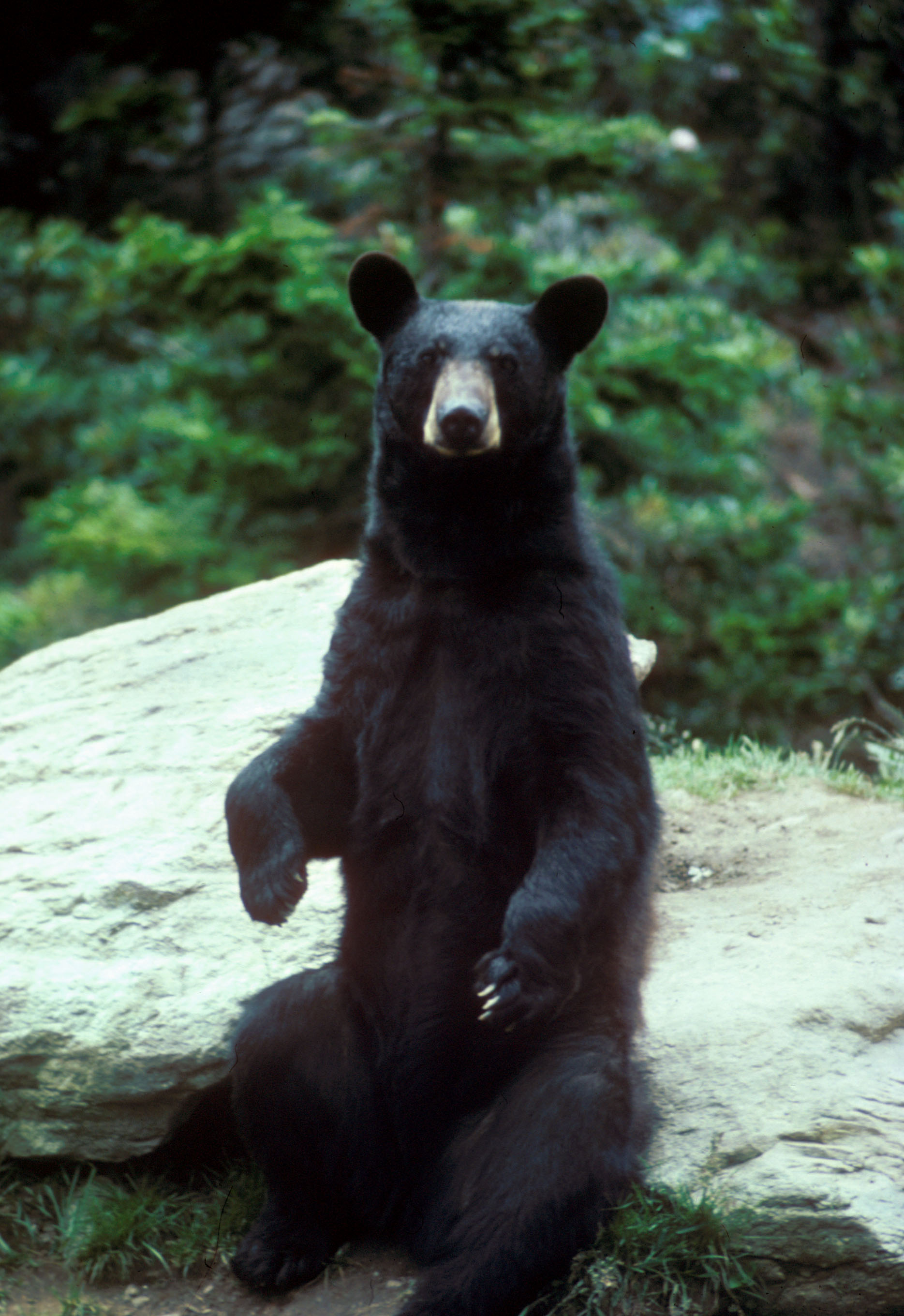
Ursus americanus

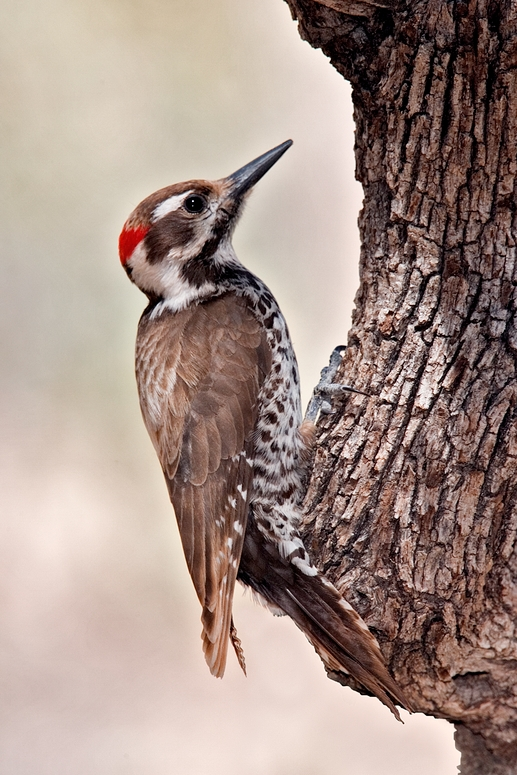
Picoides arizonae

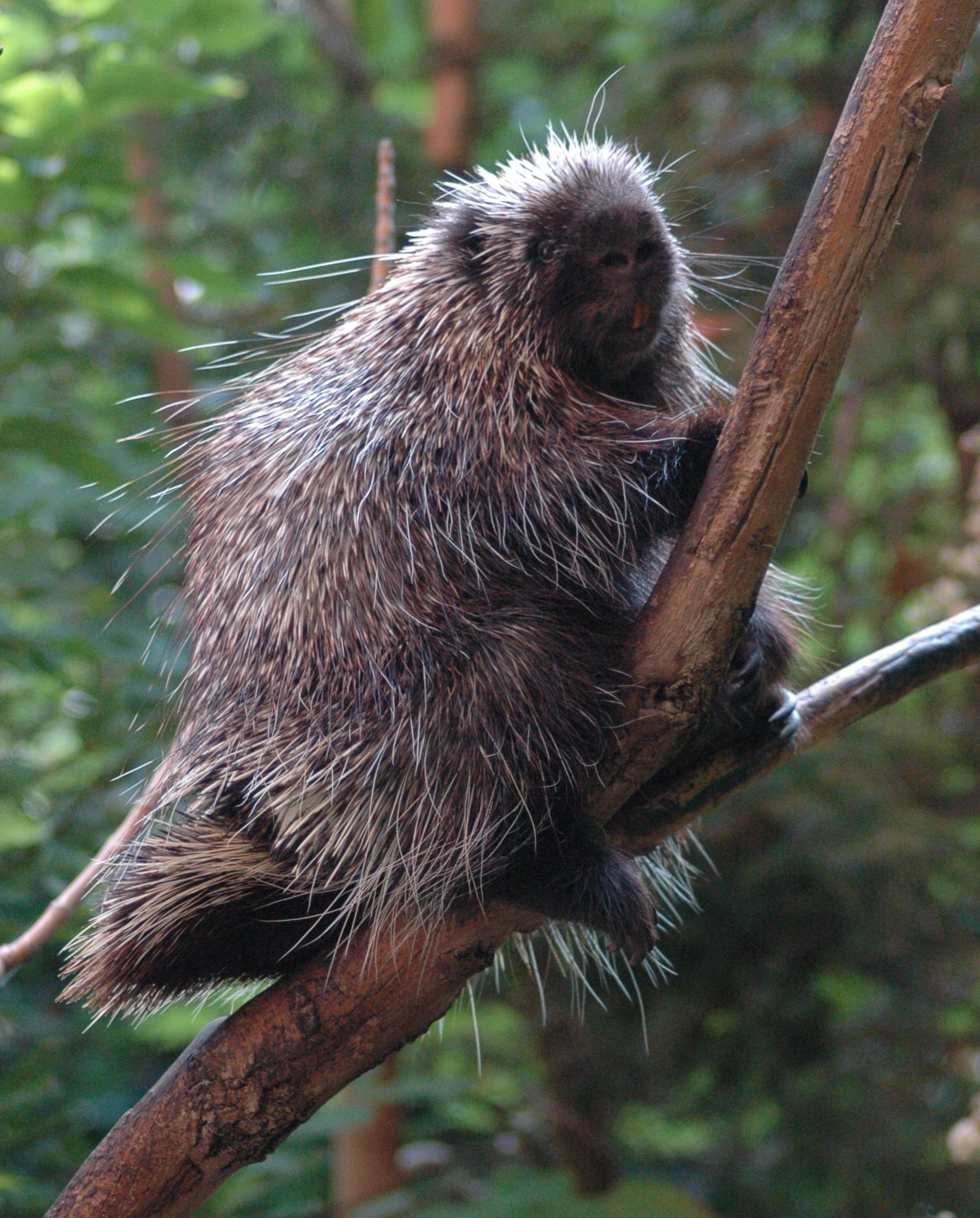
Erethizon dorsatum

== See also ==
- List of national parks of Mexico
- Natural history of Chihuahua state
- Protected areas of Chihuahua state
