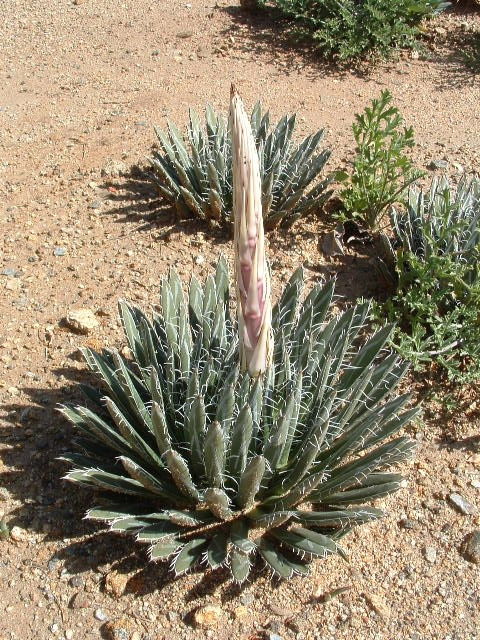
- In Cumbres de Majalca National Park, Chihuahua

Conservation status
- Least Concern (IUCN 3.1)

Scientific classification
- Kingdom: Plantae
- Clade: Tracheophytes
- Clade: Angiosperms
- Clade: Monocots
- Order: Asparagales
- Family: Asparagaceae
- Subfamily: Agavoideae
- Genus: Agave
- Species: A. polianthiflora

Binomial name
- Agave polianthiflora Gentry

= Agave polianthiflora =

Species of flowering plant

Agave polianthiflora is a relatively small member of the genus Agave, in the subfamily Agavoideae, endemic to northern Mexico.

The succulent is native to the States of Sinaloa, Chihuahua and Sonora.

Because the species is widespread and appears to have a stable population, it is not considered by the IUCN to be threatened.

== Description ==
Agave polianthiflora produces a small basal leaf rosette of about 30 cm (12 in) in diameter.

Leaves are narrow and lanceolate, with multiple white filaments protruding from their edges. Flowers are red and tubular, 4–12.5 cm (1.6–4.9 in) in length and narrow, unusual in the genus.

The flower spike is 100–200 cm (3.3–6.6 ft) tall.

== Cultivation ==
Agave polianthiflora is cultivated as an ornamental plant. It is mostly easily propagated from seed, as it does not offset as much as other species of Agave. It prefers a shallow, well-drained soil and regular fertilization during vegetation time.

As a container plant grown in cold climates, during the winter it may be kept in a completely dark place.

== See also ==
- Endemic flora of Mexico

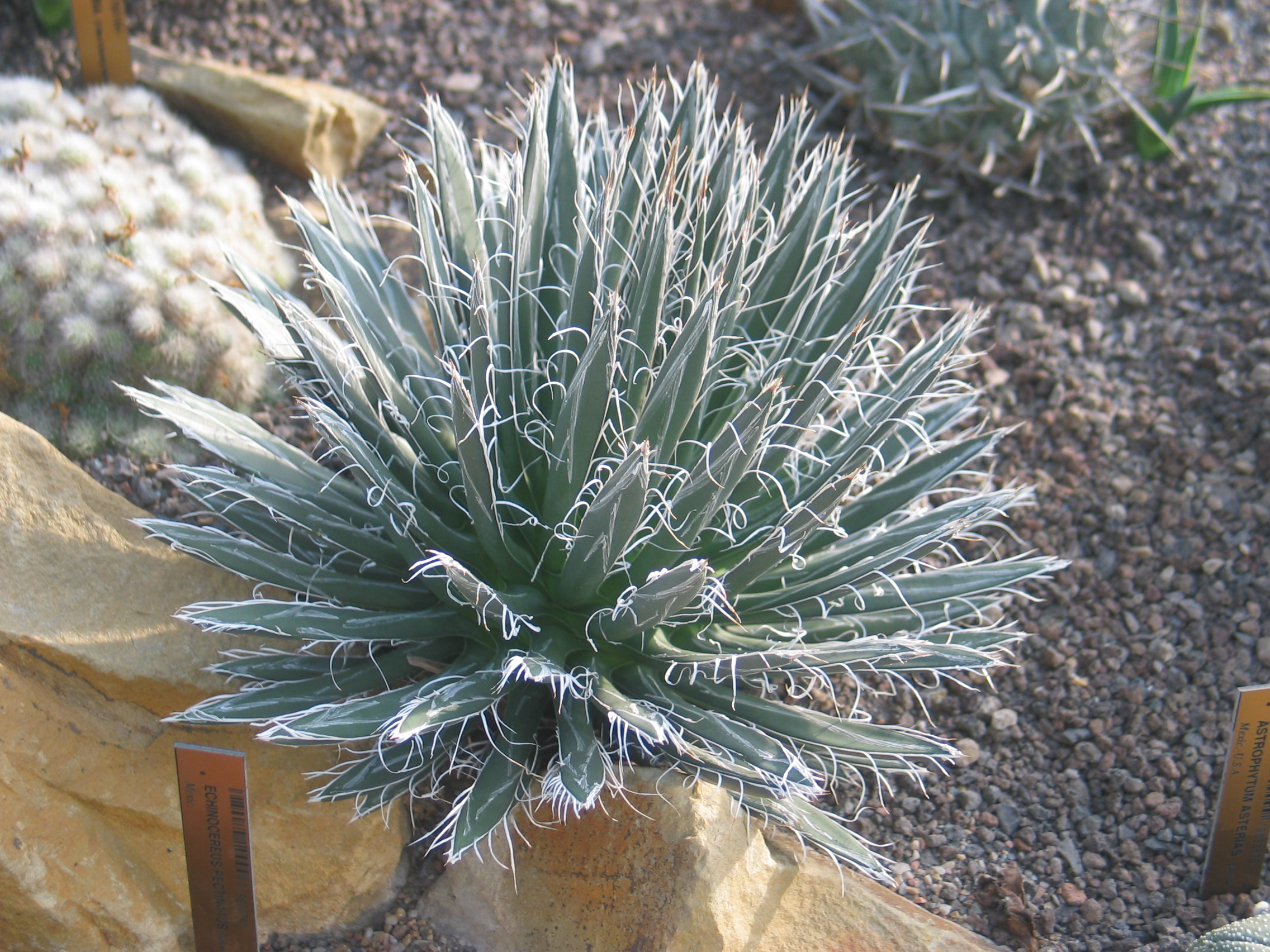
In cultivation, National Botanic Garden of Belgium.
