= Bosque Mesófilo Nevado de Colima State Park =

Protected area in western Mexico

- Parque Estatal Bosque Mesófilo Nevado de Colima
- Location within Mexico
- Location: Jalisco, Mexico
- Coordinates: 19°40′N 103°49′W
- Area: 72.14 km^{2} (27.85 sq mi)
- Designation: state park
- Designated: 2009
- Governing body: State of Jalisco

Bosque Mesófilo Nevado de Colima State Park is a protected area in western Mexico. It is located in Jalisco state, and protects four cloud forests (bosques mesofílo) on the slopes of the twin volcanoes Nevado de Colima and Volcán de Colima.

== Location ==
The state park is located in the state of Jalisco, on the slopes of the volcanic peaks Nevado de Colima and Volcán de Colima. The park covers 72.14 km^{2}, and is composed of four separate enclaves. The two northern enclaves lie east and west of Nevado de Colima, and adjoin Nevado de Colima National Park. The southern enclaves lie east and west of Volcán de Colima. The southeastern enclave adjoins Nevado de Colima National Park, and the southwestern enclave and adjoins El Jabalí Flora and Fauna Protection Area to the south, across the border in Colima state.

The park lies in the municipalities of San Gabriel, Tuxpan, Zapotitlán de Vadillo, and Zapotlán el Grande.

== Flora and fauna ==
The park includes areas of cloud forest, pine–oak forest, fir (oyamel) forest, and zacatonal (subalpine grassland).

== Conservation ==
The park was designated by decree on 11 July 2009.
