= Guadalupe Canyon Hot Springs =

Thermal springs in Baja California, Mexico

- Cañon de Guadalupe Hot Springs
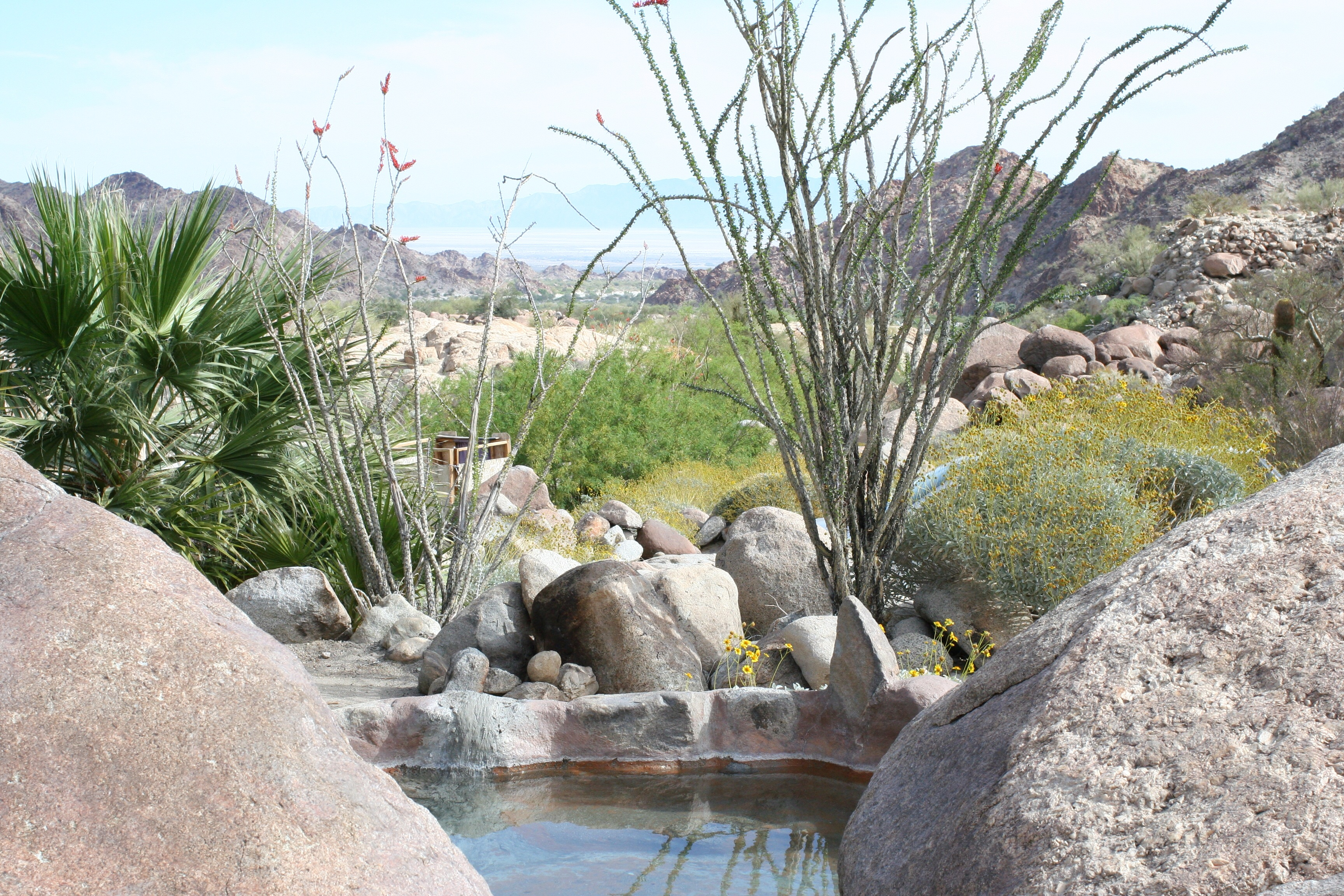
- Interactive map of Guadalupe Canyon Hot Springs
- Location: near Mexicali, Baja California, Mexico
- Coordinates: 32°9′30.24″N 115°46′13.2″W
- Elevation: 1,300 ft (400 m)
- Type: geothermal spring
- Temperature: 125 °F (52 °C)

Guadalupe Canyon Hot Springs (also known as Cañon de Guadalupe Hot Springs) are a grouping of geothermal springs located near Mexicali, Baja California, Mexico. The hot mineral water is discharged through a number of springs that divert the flow through man-made aqueducts into rock and concrete pools. The hot springs were used by indigenous people for many years before more recent settlers arrived.

== Water profile and geography ==
The alkaline water emerges at 125°F (52°C). The springs are located in Sierra de Juárez in the Cañon de Guadalupe. There are ancient petroglyphs in the area, a cave used by ancient indigenous peoples, a mud bath, and hiking, camping and rock climbing areas.

== See also ==
- List of hot springs in the United States
- List of hot springs in the world
