= List of national parks of Mexico =

List of Mexican parks

Mexico recognizes 67 federally protected natural areas as national parks (Spanish: Parques Nacionales), which are administered by the National Commission of Protected Natural Areas (CONANP), a branch of the federal Secretariat of the Environment and Natural Resources. Together, they cover a combined area of 1,432,024 hectares (3,538,610 acres) in 23 of the 31 Mexican states and the independent district of Mexico City, representing 0.73% of the territory of Mexico.

== List of national parks ==
Name	Year opened	Area (km^{2})	Location	Note
Arrecife Alacranes National Park	1994	3,337	Yucatán	
Arrecifes de Cozumel National Park	1996	119	Quintana Roo	
Arrecife de Puerto Morelos National Park	1998	90	Quintana Roo	
Arrecifes de Xcalak National Park	2000	179	Quintana Roo	
Bahía de Loreto National Park	1996	2,065	Baja California Sur	
Barranca del Cupatitzio National Park	1938	3	Michoacán	
Basaseachic Falls National Park	1981	58	Chihuahua	
Benito Juárez National Park	1937	27	Oaxaca	
Bosencheve National Park	1940	104	Michoacán; Estado de México	
Cabo Pulmo National Park	1995	71	Baja California Sur	
Cañón del Río Blanco National Park	1938	556	Veracruz	
Cañón del Sumidero National Park	1980	217	Chiapas	
Cerro de Garnica National Park	1936	9	Michoacán	
Cerro de la Estrella National Park	1938	11	Distrito Federal (Ciudad de México)	
Cerro de Las Campanas National Park	1937	0.58	Querétaro	
Cofre de Perote National Park	1937	117	Veracruz	
Constitution 1857 National Park	1962	50	Baja California	
Costa Occidental de Isla Mujeres National Park	1996	86	Quintana Roo	includes Punta Cancún y Punta Nizuc
Cumbres del Ajusco National Park	1936	9	Distrito Federal (Ciudad de México)	
Cumbres de Majalca National Park	1939	47	Chihuahua	
Cumbres de Monterrey National Park	2000	1,773	Nuevo León	
Desierto del Carmen National Park	1942	5	Estado de México	also known as Nixcongo
Desierto de los Leones National Park	1917	15	Distrito Federal (Ciudad de México)	
Dzibilchantún National Park	1987	5	Yucatán	
El Chico National Park	1982	27	Hidalgo	
El Cimatario National Park	1982	24	Querétaro	
Gogorrón National Park	1936	250	San Luis Potosí	
El Histórico Coyoacán National Park	1938	5	Distrito Federal (Ciudad de México)	see also Viveros de Coyoacán
El Potosí National Park	1936	20	San Luis Potosí	
El Sabinal National Park	1938	0.08	Nuevo León	
El Tepeyac National Park	1937	15	Distrito Federal (Ciudad de México)	
El Tepozteco National Park	1937	232	Morelos; Distrito Federal (Ciudad de México)	
El Veladero National Park	1980	36	Guerrero	
Fuentes Brotantes de Tlalpan National Park	1936	1	Distrito Federal (Ciudad de México)	
General Juan N. Álvarez National Park	1964	5	Guerrero	
Grutas de Cacahuamilpa National Park	1936	16	Guerrero	
Huatulco National Park	1998	118	Oaxaca	
Insurgente José María Morelos y Pavón National Park	1939	43	Michoacán	
Insurgente Miguel Hidalgo y Costilla National Park	1936	15	Distrito Federal (Ciudad de México)	Commonly known as La Marquesa National Park
Isla Contoy National Park	1998	51	Quintana Roo	
Isla Isabel National Park	1980	1.9	Nayarit	
Islas Marietas National Park	2005	13	Nayarit	
Iztaccíhuatl–Popocatépetl National Park	1935	398	Estado de México; Morelos; Puebla	includes Zoquiapan and annexed areas in Edo. de México, Morelos, and Puebla
La Malinche National Park	1938	457	Puebla	also known as Matlalcuéyatl
Lago de Camécuaro National Park	1941	0.1	Michoacán	
Lagunas de Chacahua National Park	1937	141	Oaxaca	
Lagunas de Montebello National Park	1959	60	Chiapas	
Lagunas de Zempoala National Park	1936	47	Morelos; Estado de México	
Lomas de Padierna National Park	1938	6	Distrito Federal (Ciudad de México)	
Los Marmoles National Park	1936	231	Hidalgo	composed of Barranca de San Vicente y Cerro de Cangando
Los Novillos National Park	1940	0.4	Coahuila	
Los Remedios National Park	1938	4	Estado de México	
Molino de Flores Nezahualcóyotl National Park	1937	0.5	Estado de México	
Nevado de Toluca National Park	1936	467	Estado de México	
Palenque National Park	1981	17	Chiapas	
Pico de Orizaba National Park	1937	197	Veracruz; Puebla	
Rayón National Park	1952	0.25	Michoacán	
Sacromonte National Park	1939	0.45	Estado de México	
San Lorenzo Marine Archipelago National Park	2005	584	Baja California	
Sierra de Órganos National Park	2000	11	Zacatecas	
Sierra de San Pedro Mártir National Park	1947	719	Baja California	
Sistema Arrecifal Veracruzano National Marine Park	1992	522	Veracruz	
Tula National Park	1981	1	Hidalgo	
Tulum National Park	1981	6	Quintana Roo	
Volcán Nevado de Colima National Park	1936	96	Colima	
Xicoténcatl National Park	1937	6	Tlaxcala	

== See also ==
- Mexican Protected Natural Areas

== Sources ==
- CONANP listing of parks (Spanish)
- Guia Roji: Por las carreteras de México, 2006
