= Constitution 1857 National Park =

National park in Baja California, Mexico

- IUCN category II (national park)
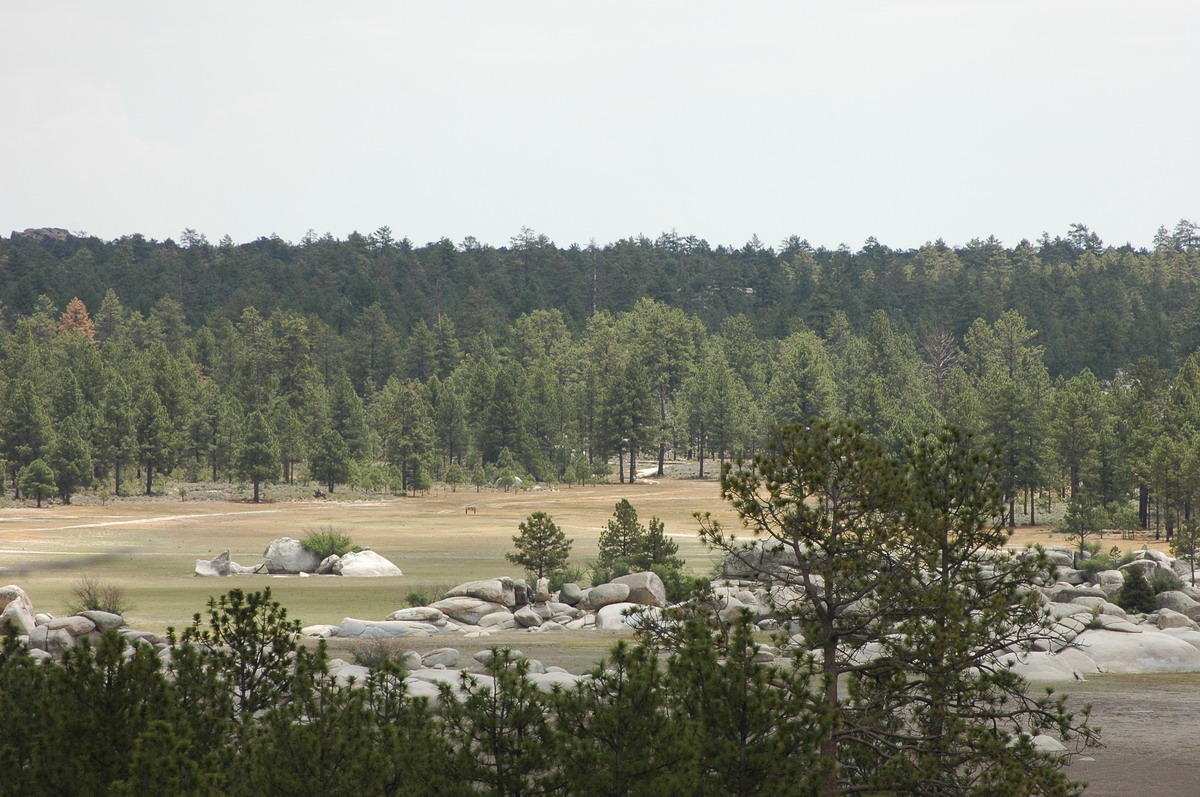

- Location within Mexico
- Location: Ensenada Municipality, Baja California, Mexico
- Nearest city: Ensenada, Baja California
- Coordinates: 32°00′42″N 116°04′54″W
- Area: 5,009 hectares (12,380 acres)
- Established: April 27, 1962
- Governing body: Secretariat of the Environment and Natural Resources

Ramsar Wetland
- Official name: Laguna Hanson, Parque Nacional Constitución de 1857
- Designated: 2 February 2010
- Reference no.: 1923

Constitution 1857 National Park (Spanish: Parque nacional Constitución de 1857) is a national park of Mexico located in the pine forests of the Sierra de Juárez mountain range in the northern part of Baja California. The park is an important preserve for many native wild animals like bighorn sheep and mule deer. The park is characterized by the large variety of coniferous plant species.

== History ==
The park was created by decree of the Mexican federal government on April 27, 1962. It was important to create a protected area to preserve the forest and the ecosystem that it sustains. The park is deeply appreciated for its beauty and the existence of small lakes. The park is named after the 1857 Constitution of Mexico.

== Geography ==
Constitution 1857 National Park is a 5,009-hectare (12,380-acre) mountainous area located in the northern part of Baja California, Mexico. The city of Ensenada, Baja California is located approximately 96 kilometres (60 mi) from the park on Federal Highway 3, near the village of Ojos Negros. The highest elevation nearby and just outside the park is 1,842 metres (6,043 ft).

The park is mostly located in the valley of the Hanson Plain characterized by granite and sand beds surrounded by the Sierra de Juárez. Laguna Hanson (Juárez Lake) is located in the center of the park at an elevation of 1,580 metres (5,180 ft) above sea level. Laguna Hanson is the main lake in the park, but there are several dry lakes on the Hanson Plain that hold water for only part of the year. The Hanson Plain is thought to have formed during the Mesozoic Era. The Sierra de Juárez is a subdivision of the mountain range named the Cordillera Baja California, which is an extension of the Sierra Nevada mountain range.

== Climate ==
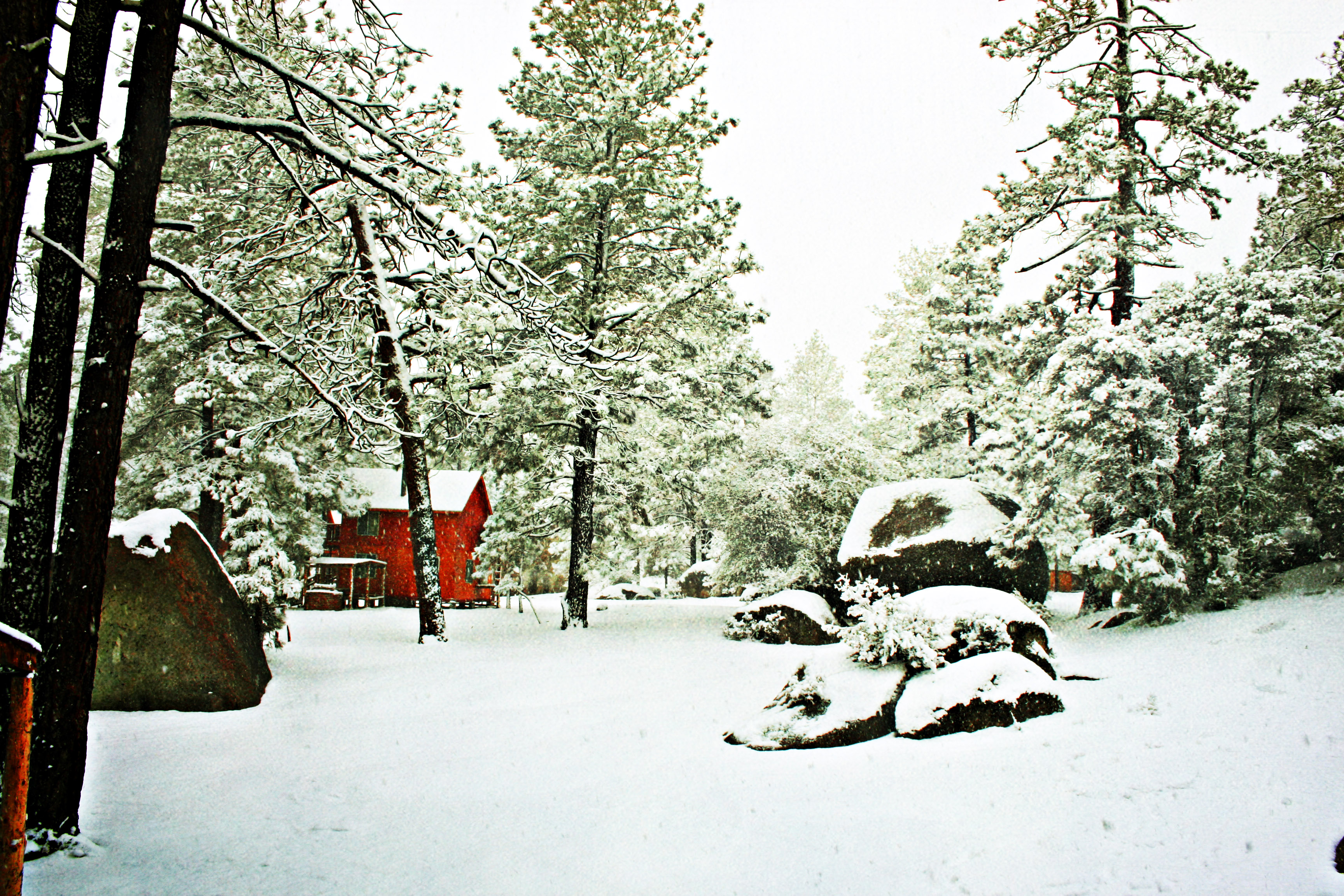
Winter in Constitution 1857 National Park

The climate is temperate subhumid. Winters are cool and receive more rain than any other season. Several rainstorms and a few snowstorms allow scattered lakes to appear on the Hanson Plain. During the winter, many of the lakes freeze over due to shallow depths and low temperatures at night. Summers are warm and relatively dry (Csb/Dsb in the Köppen climate classification). Over summer, the rate of evaporation and low humidity dry most of the lakes that appeared during the wet season.

== Flora and fauna ==
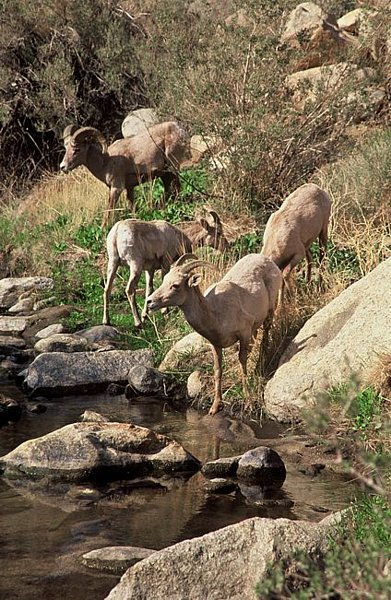
Bighorn sheep are a native species of the Sierra de Juárez

Constitution 1857 National Park and Sierra de San Pedro Mártir National Park are the main terrestrial wildlife refuges on the peninsula of Baja California, with many regionally important native plant and animal species.

The Sierra de Juárez contains several coniferous species; the most abundant are: Pinus jeffreyi, Pinus ponderosa, Pinus cembroide, Pinus quadrifolia, Pinus monophylla, Juniperus, Arctostaphylos drupacea, Artemisa ludoviciana, and Adenostoma esparcifolium. The flora shares many species with the Laguna Mountains and the San Jacinto Mountains in southwestern California. The lower elevations of the Sierra de Juárez are characterized by chaparral and desert shrub.

The fauna throughout the park includes many mammals, primarily mule deer, bighorn sheep, cougars, bobcats, ringtails, coyotes, rabbits, squirrels and more than 30 species of bats. The park is also home to many avian species, like bald eagles, golden eagles, black vultures, falcons woodpeckers, crows, and several species of nuthatches and ducks.
