= Fuentes Brotantes de Tlalpan National Park =

National park in Mexico City, Mexico

- IUCN category II (national park)
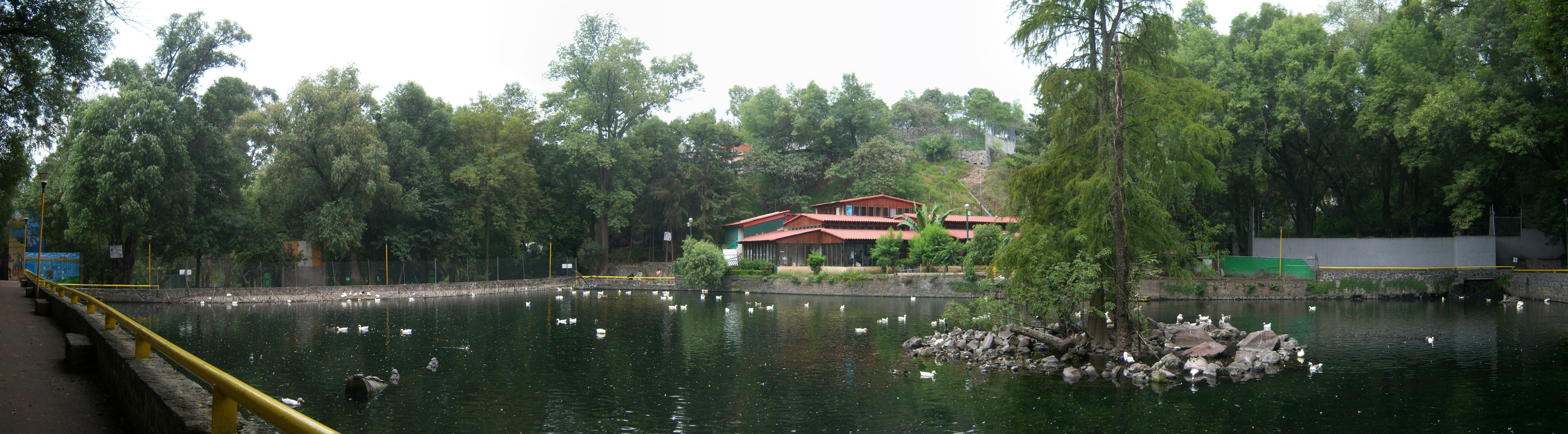
- Pond at Fuentes Brotantes de Tlalpan National Park.

- Location within Mexico
- Interactive map of Fuentes Brotantes de Tlalpan National Park
- Location: Mexico City, Mexico
- Coordinates: 19.285°N 99.181°W
- Area: 138 ha (340 acres)
- Established: 1936

Fuentes Brotantes de Tlalpan National Park is a national park located in the Tlalpan district of southern Mexico City. It was declared a National Park on 28 September 1936, on what was previously known as the Rancho Teochtíhuitl and the Barranca de los Manantiales. Established in 1936, the park is known for its natural springs, which give it the name “Fuentes Brotantes”, meaning “bubbling springs” in Spanish. Its lush vegetation, freshwater springs, and tranquil environment have made it an essential ecological and recreational site within the city.

== Natural history ==
Most wildlife species that inhabit the park were brought and acclimatized to it, as a result of the donations from SEMARNAT and other animal welfare institutions.

The park's main characteristic are ponds, fed by a few springs flowing from the foothills of the Sierra del Ajusco.

== Recreation ==
Fuentes Brotantes de Tlalpan National Park is 8 hectares (20 acres) in size. The park has landscaped areas, birdwatching, food stalls, and restaurants. It is one of the more visited spots by the residents of the southern city area. Hiking trails of varying difficulty wind through the park, providing opportunities for scenic walks and exercise. The park’s picnic areas are equipped with tables and benches, often used by visitors for family outings and gatherings. In addition to picnicking and hiking, visitors can engage in birdwatching, and the park’s freshwater ponds are frequented by visitors interested in viewing native amphibians and aquatic plants.

== Location and geography ==
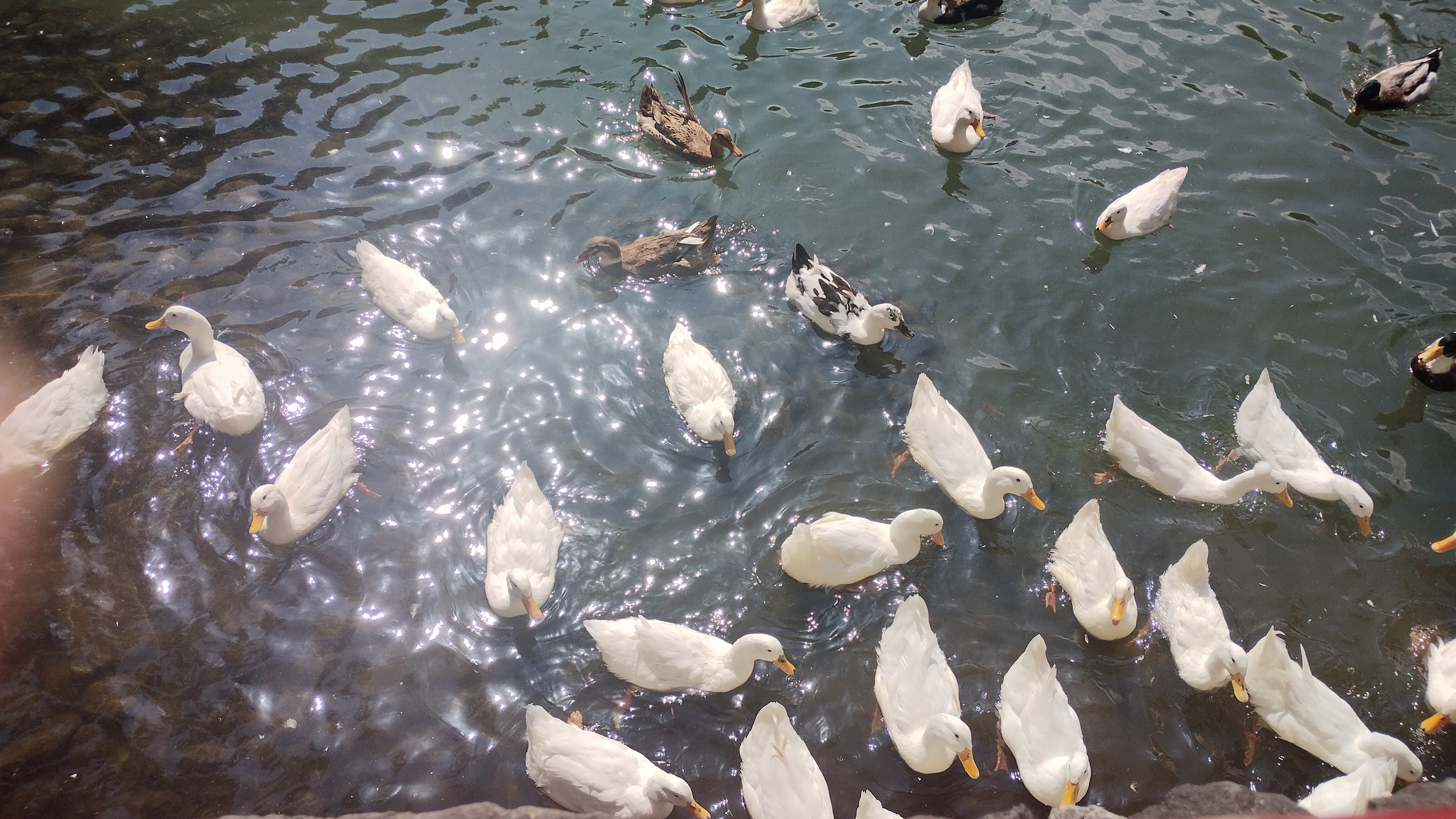
The Fuentes Brotantes de Tlalpan National Park’s pond with ducks

Fuentes Brotantes is located in southern Mexico City, within the Tlalpan borough, one of the city’s largest administrative divisions. The park’s terrain is characterized by a combination of lush wooded areas, grassy clearings, and freshwater springs. The elevation of the park is higher than much of Mexico City, contributing to its cooler and more temperate climate. The natural springs that emerge from underground aquifers are a defining feature, although urbanization has affected the volume of water in recent years. The springs are part of a larger hydrological system that connects with the volcanic mountain ranges of the Valley of Mexico, making the park an important ecological buffer.

== Ecology and biodiversity ==
Fuentes Brotantes de Tlalpan is home to a variety of flora and fauna, providing a rich habitat for wildlife despite its urban surroundings. The park’s vegetation includes species typical of temperate forests, such as oak and pine trees, alongside grasses and shrubs native to the Valley of Mexico. Its biodiversity includes various species of birds, such as hawks, hummingbirds, and woodpeckers, making it a popular spot for bird watchers. Small mammals, insects, and amphibians also inhabit the park, thriving in the wooded and wetland areas created by the springs.

== Environmental significance and conservation efforts ==
Fuentes Brotantes holds ecological significance as one of the remaining natural spring areas in Mexico City, a region that has seen many of its natural water sources drained or diminished due to urbanization. The park plays an important role in conserving native plant and animal species, acting as an urban green lung that helps reduce pollution and maintain biodiversity within the metropolitan area. Conservation efforts focus on maintaining the health of the natural springs, controlling pollution, and reforesting areas impacted by urban encroachment. Local environmental organizations, along with Mexico City’s government, have implemented programs aimed at environmental education and community involvement to protect and preserve the park’s natural resources.

== Historical and cultural importance ==
At the end of the 18th century, the lands of the town of San Agustín de las Cuevas were sold to the Hacienda de Tochihuitl and the La Fama Montañesa spinning and weaving factory was built near that place. This land included a series of springs that fed the factory and belonged at one time to Ricardo Sainz; this set of springs was known as "Las Fuentes" and was surrounded by camphor trees.

At one point the factory owners and the City Council fought over the property that included the Las Fuentes springs . It was not until September 9, 1936 that the President of Mexico, Lázaro Cárdenas del Río, decreed that Fuentes Brotantes had the category of national park with the objective of preserving the forests against threats from man. In that decree, 129 hectares were designated, which at one time were part of the Teochtihuitl ranch for popular recreation and a place for forestry and fishing education.

Currently, of the 129 hectares that were designated for this park, only 8 remain. The rest have been disappearing due to the growth of Mexico City. There are around 150 irregular houses in this place that have electricity, telephone and collect water from the stream.

== Current challenges ==
Despite its protected status, Fuentes Brotantes faces several challenges due to urban pressures and environmental degradation. The volume of water from the springs has decreased over the years due to the over-extraction of groundwater and the effects of urban development. Pollution from nearby areas and visitor traffic also pose risks to the park’s ecosystems. Conservation efforts continue, focusing on restoring the natural hydrology of the area, educating the public about environmental stewardship, and managing visitor impact on sensitive areas.

== Community involvement and environmental education ==
Fuentes Brotantes de Tlalpan plays a significant role in promoting environmental awareness among Mexico City residents. Local environmental organizations and schools frequently organize educational programs, workshops, and guided tours for students and families. These initiatives aim to foster a deeper appreciation for nature and promote sustainable practices that protect the park’s ecological balance.

== See also ==
- National parks of Mexico
