= Laguna Hanson =

Lake in the Sierra de Juárez in Baja California state of Mexico

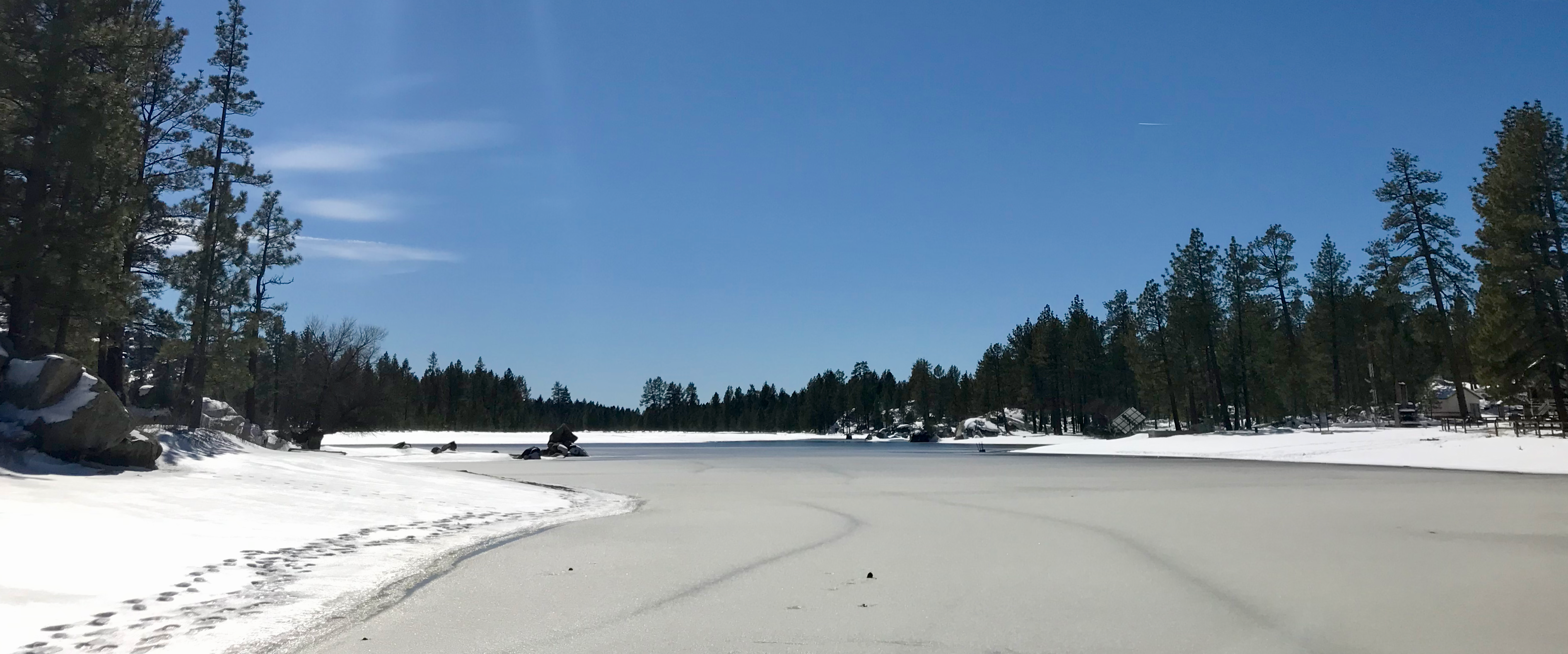

- Location of Laguna Hanson in Baja California state
- Location: Constitución de 1857 National Park, Baja California, Mexico
- Coordinates: 32°01′N 115°54′W
- Surface elevation: 1,620 metres (5,310 ft)

Ramsar Wetland
- Official name: Laguna Hanson, Parque Nacional Constitución de 1857
- Designated: 2 February 2010
- Reference no.: 1923

Laguna Hanson is a lake in the Sierra de Juárez in Baja California state of Mexico. The lake is located in Constitución de 1857 National Park at 1,620 metres (5,310 ft) elevation.

The lake provides a feeding, resting, and breeding area for at least 29 species of birds, including the migratory birds gadwall (Mareca streptera) and redhead duck (Aythya americana).

The lake and its floodplain was designated a Ramsar site (wetland of international importance) in 2020. The Ramsar site covers an area of 511 hectares.
