= El Jabalí Flora and Fauna Protection Area =

Protected natural area in Colima State, Mexico

- IUCN category VI (protected area with sustainable use of natural resources)
- Location within Mexico
- Coordinates: 19°28′N 103°39′W
- Area: 5,179 ha (20.00 sq mi)
- Designation: Flora and fauna protection area
- Designated: 2000
- Administrator: National Commission of Natural Protected Areas

El Jabalí Flora and Fauna Protection Area is a protected natural area in Colima State, Mexico. It covers an area of 51.79 km^{2}, which includes forests and several natural lakes.

== Geography ==
El Jabalí is in the northern part of the state, and the Jalisco–Colima border forms its northern boundary. The protected area is on the lower slopes of two volcanic peaks, Volcán de Colima and Nevado de Colima, which rise to the northeast, and it adjoins Volcán Nevado de Colima National Park. Elevations range from 1200 to 2300 meters, generally decreasing from east to west.

The area contains several natural lakes or lagoons—La María, El Calabozo, El Jabalí, and La Escondida. Several permanent streams descend from the volcanic peaks and run from east to west through the area.

Annual mean temperature ranges from 12 to 18º C.

== Flora and fauna ==
According to the National Biodiversity Information System of Comisión Nacional para el Conocimiento y Uso de la Biodiversidad (CONABIO), El Jabalí Flora and Fauna Protection Area has over 1,540 plant and animal species, of which 63 are at risk and 58 are exotics.

El Jabalí is in the Trans-Mexican Volcanic Belt pine–oak forests ecoregion. Plant communities include montane oak forest and pine forest and remnant cloud forests, with walnut, cedar, and ash trees. There are small areas of dry forest at lower elevations.

Native mammals include white-tailed deer (Odocoileus virginianus), coyote (Canis latrans), gray fox (Urocyon cinereoargenteus), raccoon (Procyon lotor), and nine-banded armadillo (Dasypus novemcinctus).

100 bird species have been recorded here, including long-tailed wood partridge (Dendrortyx macroura), banded quail (Philortyx fasciatus), sparkling-tailed woodstar (Tilmatura dupontii), golden-cheeked woodpecker (Melanerpes chrysogenys), grey-crowned woodpecker (Colaptes auricularis), white-striped woodcreeper (Lepidocolaptes leucogaster), spotted wren (Campylorhynchus gularis), white-bellied wren (Uropsila leucogastra), brown-backed solitaire (Myadestes occidentalis), slaty vireo (Vireo brevipennis), golden vireo (Vireo hypochryseus), fan-tailed warbler (Basileuterus lachrymosus), and rusty-crowned ground sparrow (Melozone kieneri).

== Conservation ==
El Jabalí was decreed a Forest Protection Area and Wildlife Refuge on 14 August 1981 by President José López Portillo. It was designated a flora and fauna protection area in 2000.

Its objectives are:

- Preserving habitat conservation
- Natural reproduction of species
- Archiving ecological balance and protection in the ambient habitat
- Protecting both wild plant and animal species that use the area refuge.

In the lagoon area, "it is strictly prohibited at all times to fish, hunt, capture, chase, harass or harm in any way the animals that inhabit temporarily or permanently the area." Non-destructive activities such as camping are permitted.
