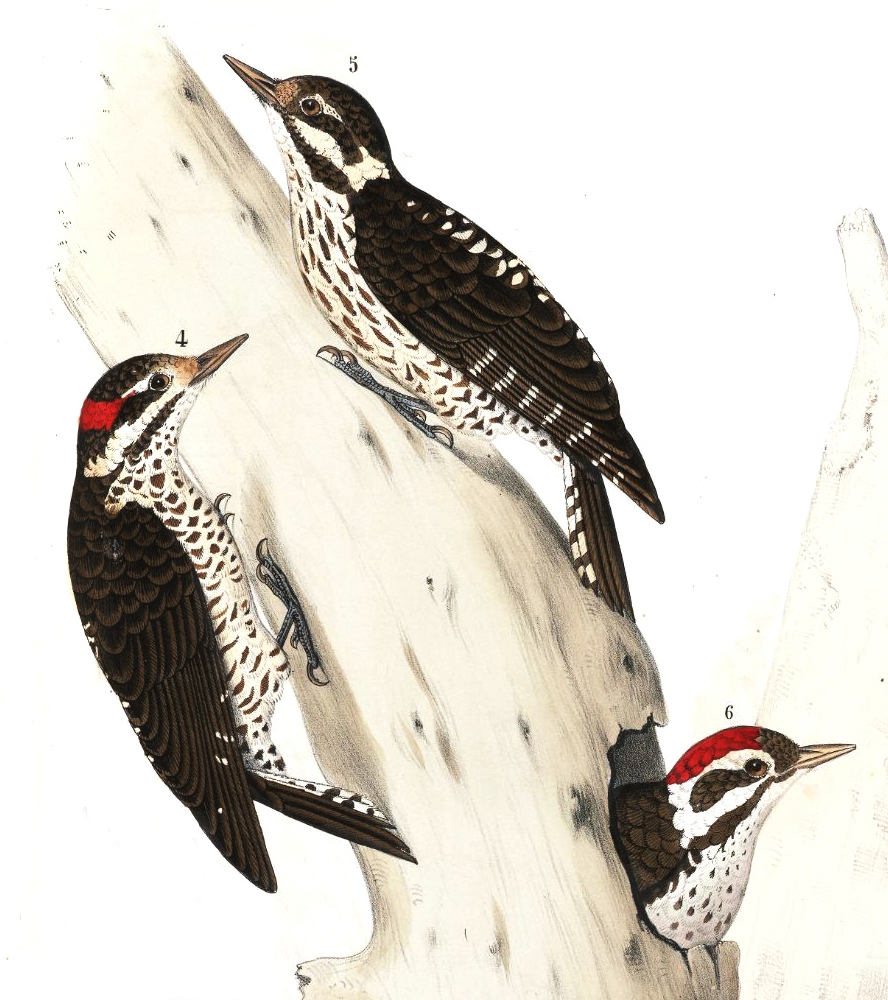

Conservation status
- Least Concern (IUCN 3.1)

Scientific classification
- Kingdom: Animalia
- Phylum: Chordata
- Class: Aves
- Order: Piciformes
- Family: Picidae
- Genus: Leuconotopicus
- Species: L. stricklandi

Binomial name
- Leuconotopicus stricklandi (Malherbe, 1845)

Synonyms
- Picoides stricklandi

= Strickland's woodpecker =

Species of bird

Strickland's woodpecker (Leuconotopicus stricklandi) is a medium-sized species of woodpecker endemic to Mexico. The Arizona woodpecker (L. arizonae) was formerly considered the northern subspecies of this bird until the 42nd supplement of the American Ornithologists Union checklist, which officially split them into two separate species.

== Taxonomy ==
Strickland's woodpecker was first described by the French ornithologist Alfred Malherbe in 1845 and given its current name which commemorates the British scientist Hugh Edwin Strickland. Some taxonomic authorities, including the American Ornithological Society, continue to place this species in the genus Picoides.

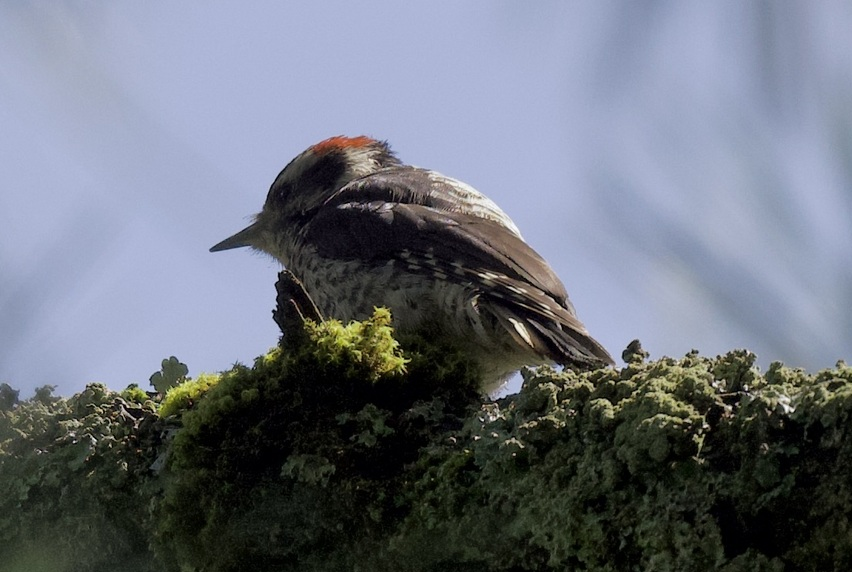
On branch

== Description ==
Strickland's woodpeckers grow to be about 7 to 8 inches in length, and are mainly brown and white in color. They are brown on top with a dark rump and have white underparts speckled with many brown spots. Strickland's woodpeckers usually have three white bars on their wings, and have two white stripes across their face which join with another white bar on their neck. Male Strickland's woodpeckers also have a red patch on the nape of their head which is lacking on females.

The nest of this species is in a cavity excavated from a dead tree trunk. The female lays three to four white eggs on a bed of wood chips, but other details of nesting periods and duration are mostly unknown.

== Habitat ==
A quiet and shy bird, Strickland's woodpeckers are fairly common in their limited range, usually found in pine forests and mixed pine-oak slopes at heights of about 4,500 to 7,000 feet. The Strickland's woodpecker's range generally follows a thin east–west band in central Mexico from Michoacán to Veracruz.
