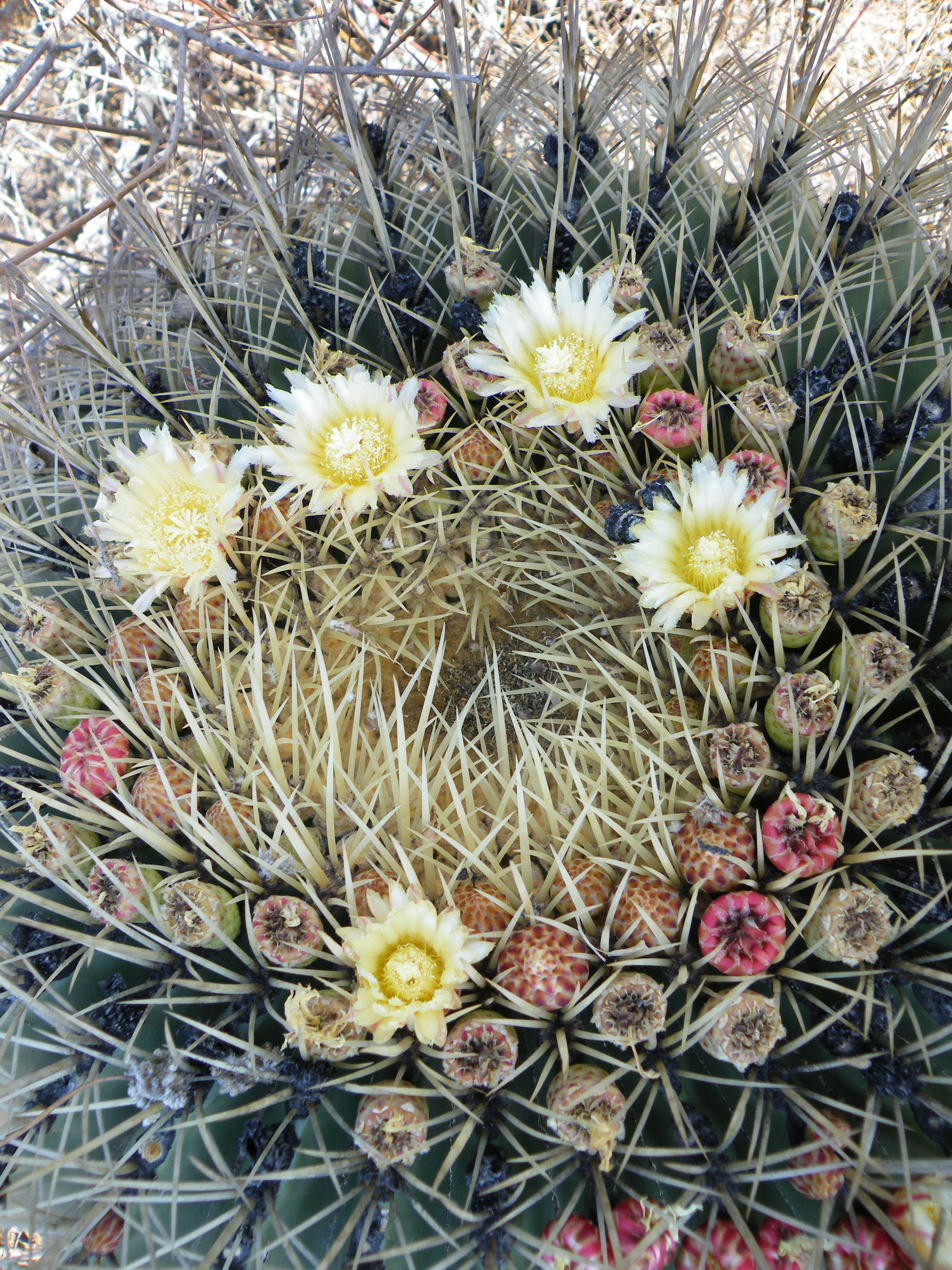

Conservation status
- Least Concern (IUCN 3.1)

Scientific classification
- Kingdom: Plantae
- Clade: Tracheophytes
- Clade: Angiosperms
- Clade: Eudicots
- Order: Caryophyllales
- Family: Cactaceae
- Subfamily: Cactoideae
- Genus: Ferocactus
- Species: F. histrix

Binomial name
- Ferocactus histrix (DC.) G.E. Linds. 1955

Synonyms
- List: Bisnaga histrix (DC.) Doweld 1999; Echinocactus histrix DC. 1828; Bisnaga electracantha (Lem.) Orcutt 1926; Cactus multangularis Moc. & Sessé ex DC. 1828; Echinocactus coulteri G.Don 1834; Echinocactus electracanthus Lem. 1838; Echinocactus electracanthus var. rufispinus Müll.Arg. 1893; Echinocactus hystrichacanthus Lem. 1839; Echinocactus lancifer Rchb. ex Walp. 1843; Echinocactus melocactiformis DC. 1828; Echinocactus oxypterus Zucc. ex Pfeiff. 1837; Echinocactus pfersdorffii Schelle 1906; Echinocactus pycnoxyphus Lem. 1839; Echinofossulocactus oxypterus (Zucc. ex Pfeiff.) Lawr. 1841; Ferocactus melocactiformis (DC.) Britton & Rose 1922

= Ferocactus histrix =

Species of cactus

Ferocactus histrix, also known as Acitrón barrel cactus (Biznaga barril de acitrón) is a species of Ferocactus native to central Mexico. It is a large barrel cactus that can be commonly found throughout all the Central Mexican matorral. It produces an edible fruit appreciated for its sour taste.

== Description ==
This cactus grows as an unbranched spherical globe, and can reach more than 1 meter (3.3 ft) in height after several years. Mature plants can have their stem divided in up to 25 to 40 ribs. The epidermis is blue-green in mature plants. As in other cacti species, when the apical meristem is damaged, the plant produces new shoots from the areoles close to the tip of the stem. Spines are light yellow and turn brown as they age. There are one to four protruding central spines that are straight or slightly curve, flattened or angular and up to 9 cm (3.5 in) long. The six to nine radial spines are slightly curved, round and up to 8 cm (3.1 in) long.

It produces yellow medium-sized flowers from early to late spring and usually the fruits are mature by summer. It flowers when the plant is 10 years or older, though in cultivation they can flower earlier. After flowering, the Mexican cactus produces small, edible fruits that are often enjoyed by birds and other desert animals. Known for its ability to adapt to arid desert environments. It has a deep root system that allows it to absorb water from deep in the soil. This cactus also has a thick, waxy outer layer that helps prevent water loss through evaporation. This slow-growing cactus initially grows as a globular and then columnar cactus.

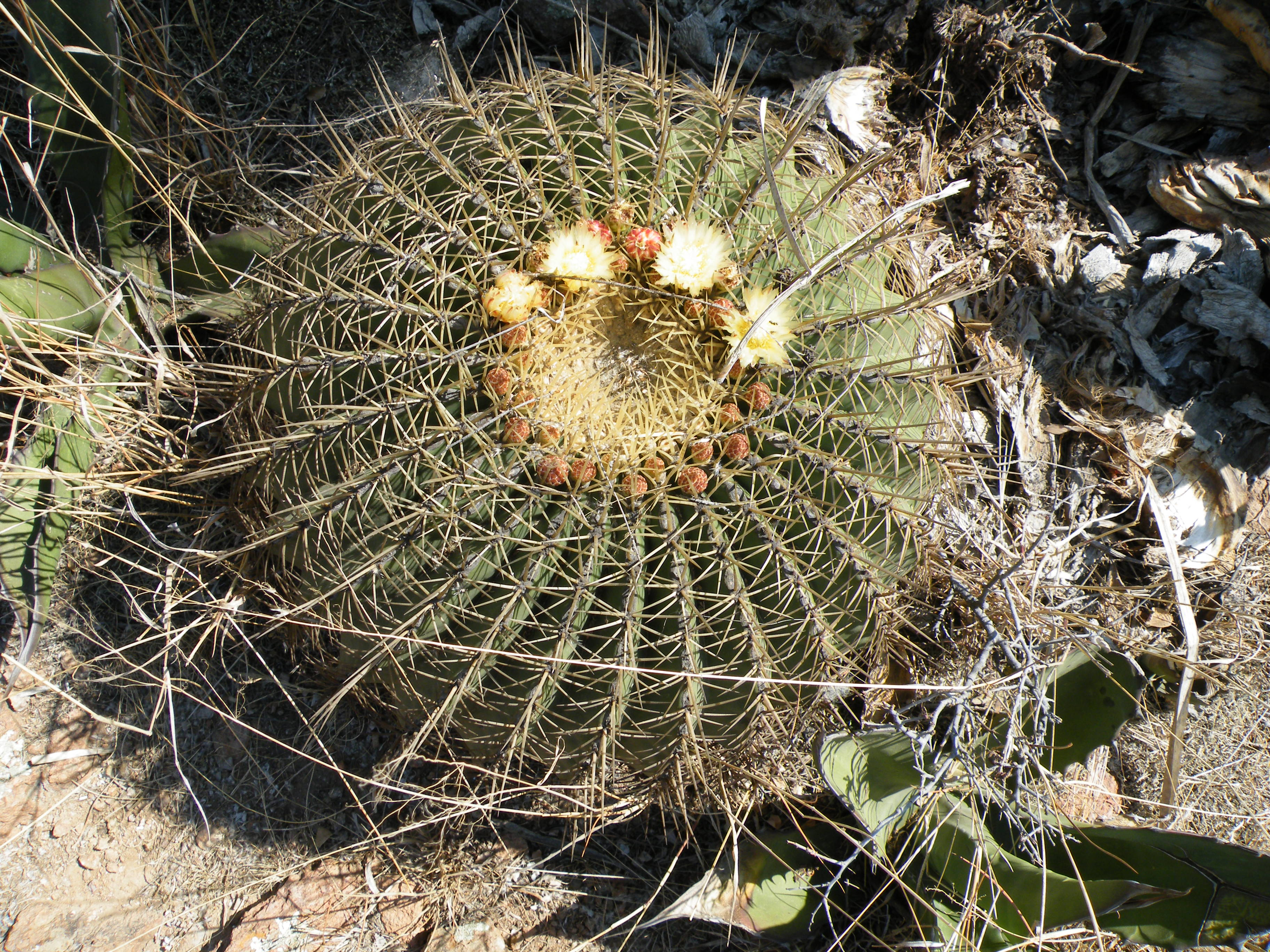
Plant

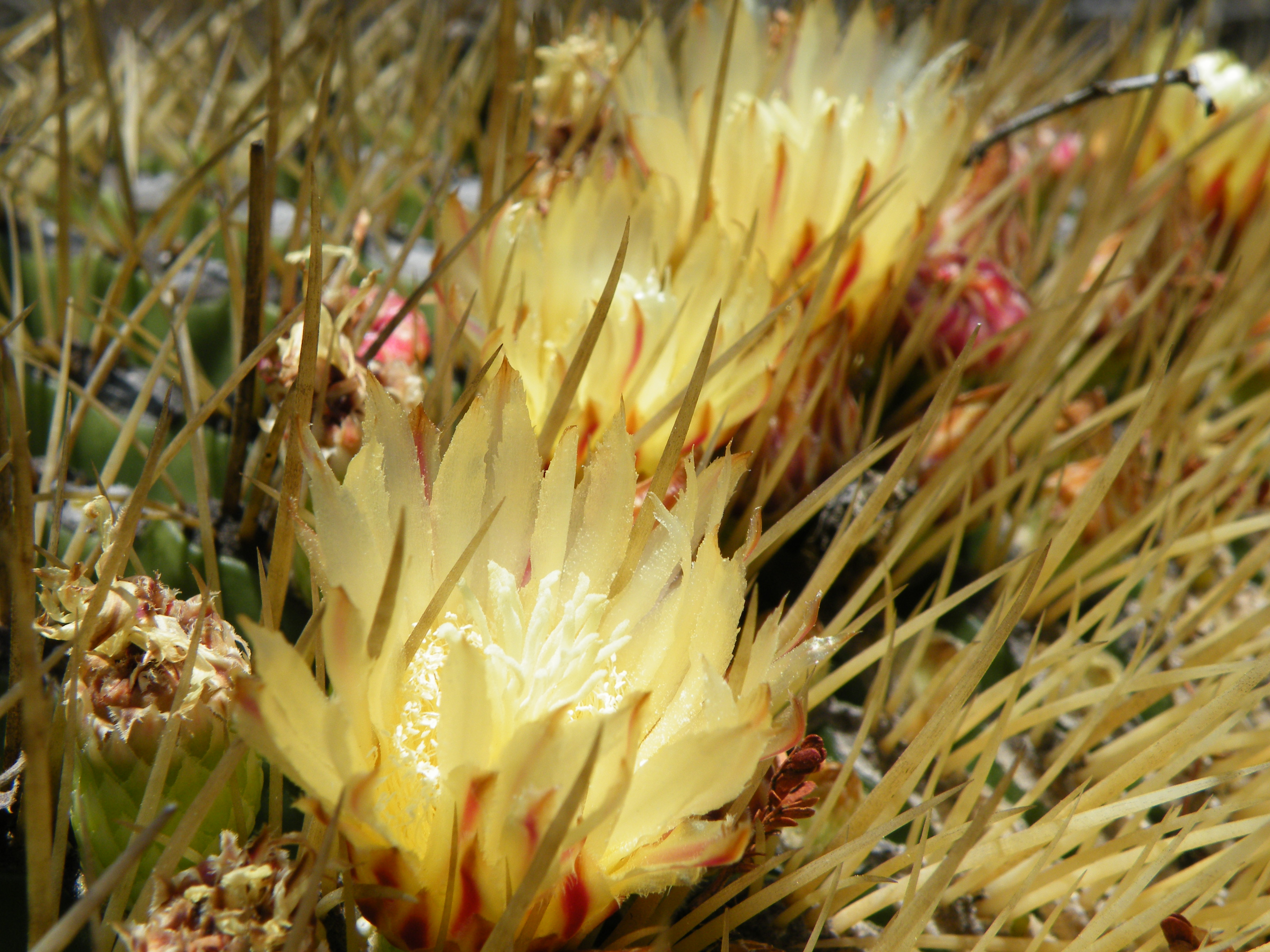
Flowers

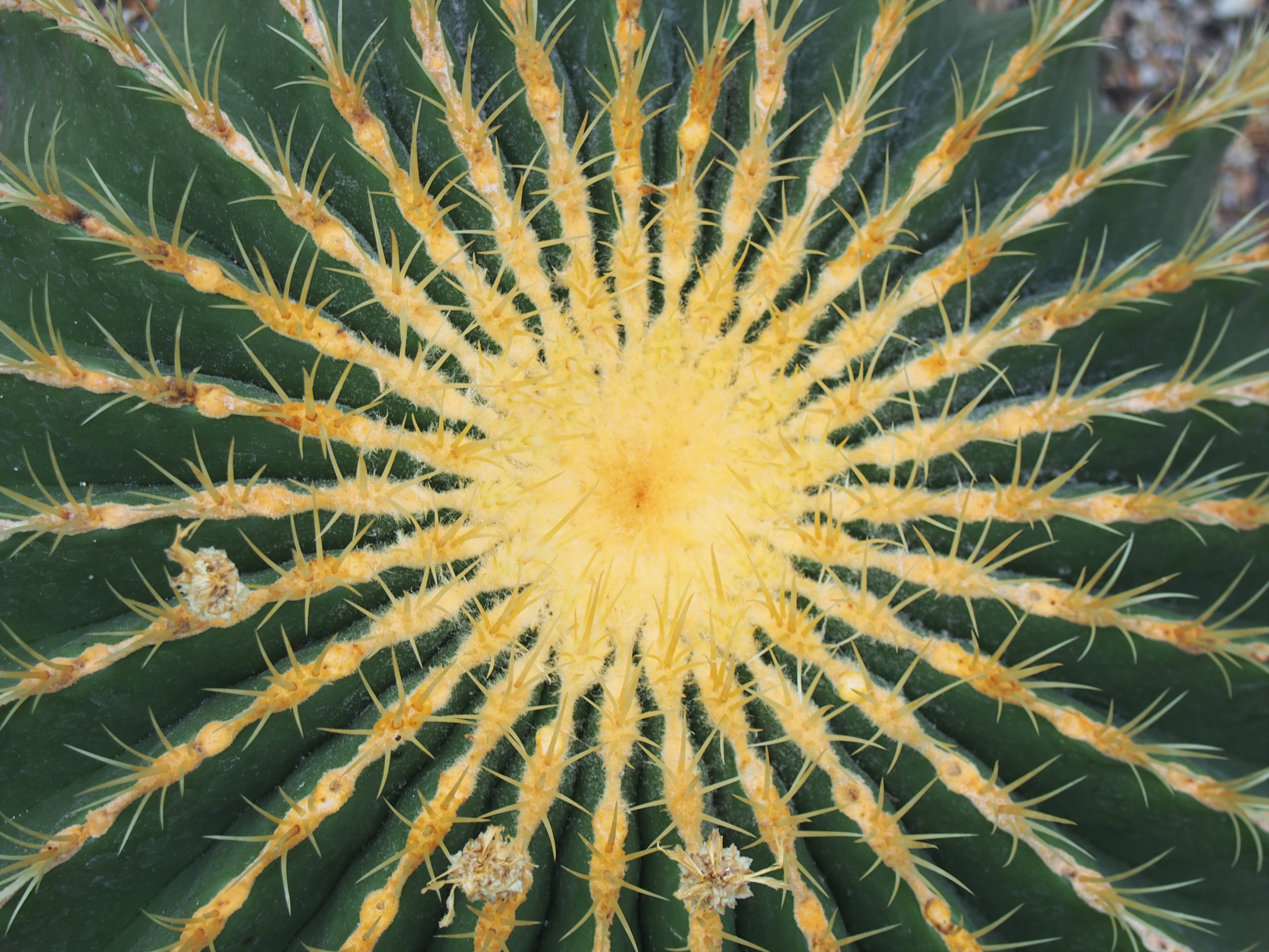
Center of plant

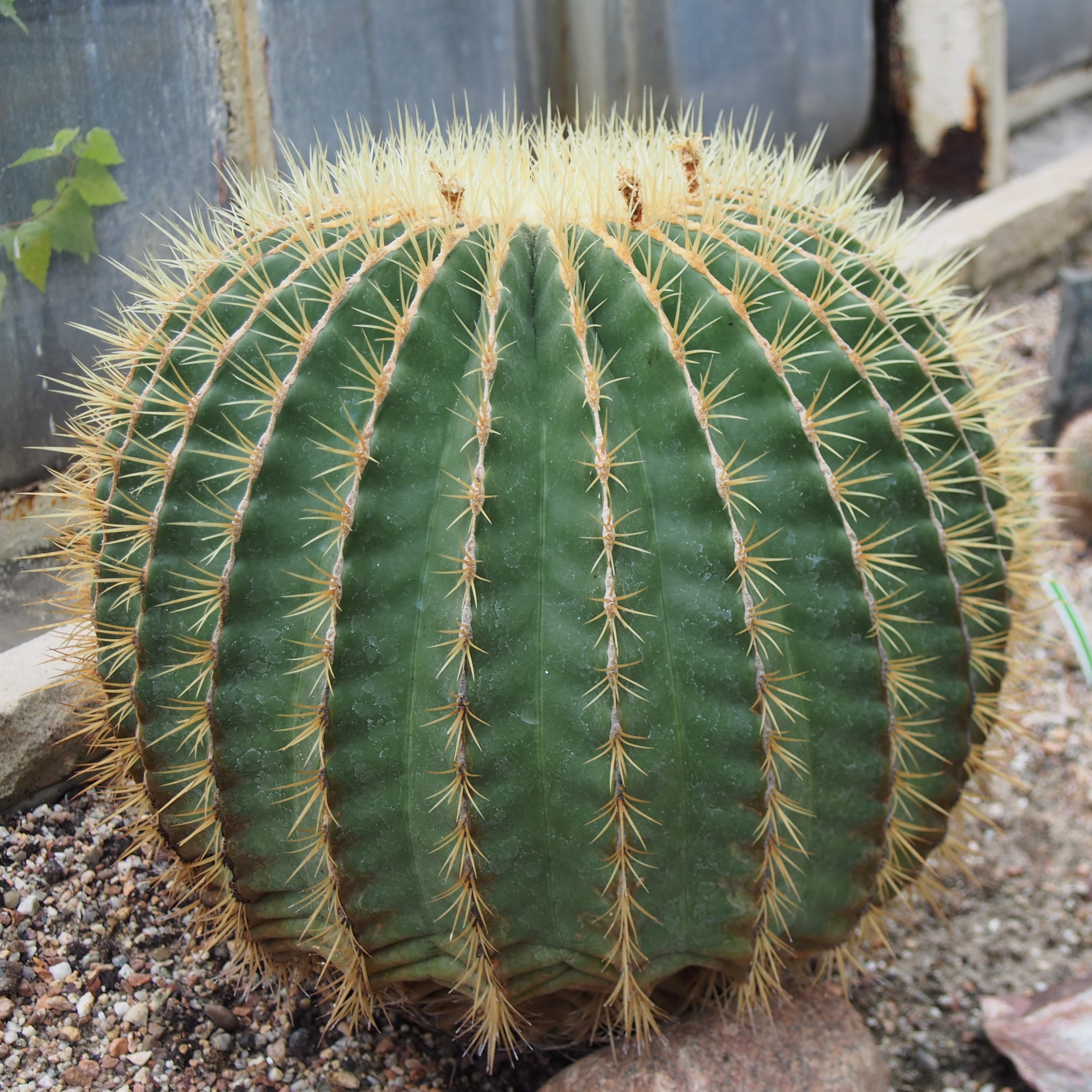
Side view of plant

== Distribution and habitat ==
This cactus can be found (from east to west) in Hidalgo, Querétaro, Guanajuato, San Luis Potosí, Aguascalientes, Jalisco, Zacatecas and Durango which makes it one of the barrel cacti with some of the largest distribution. It grows in xeric shrublands and volcanic slopes at elevations of 1200 and 2600 meters.

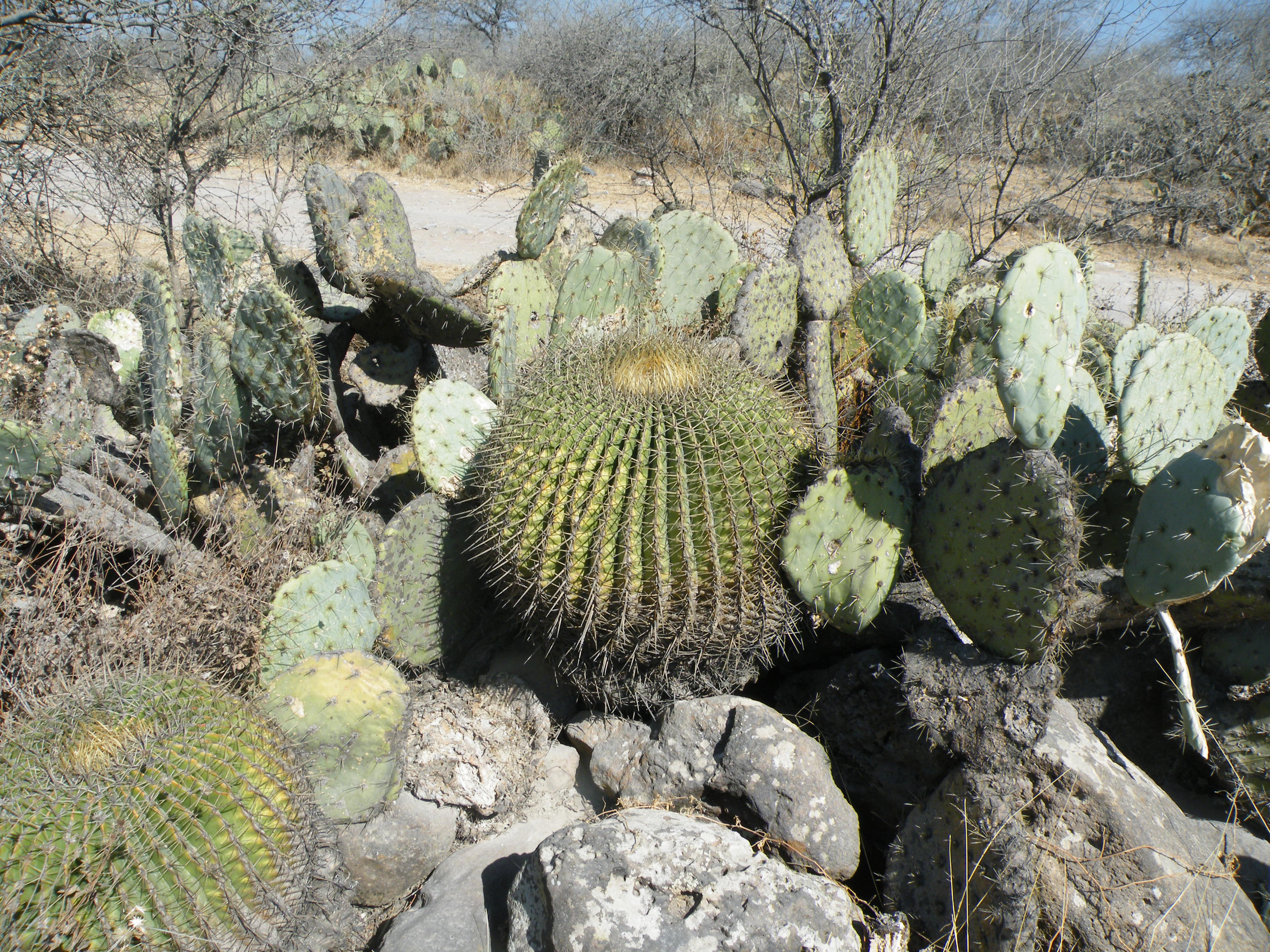
Plant growing habitat in Estación Ventura, San Luis Potosi, Mexico

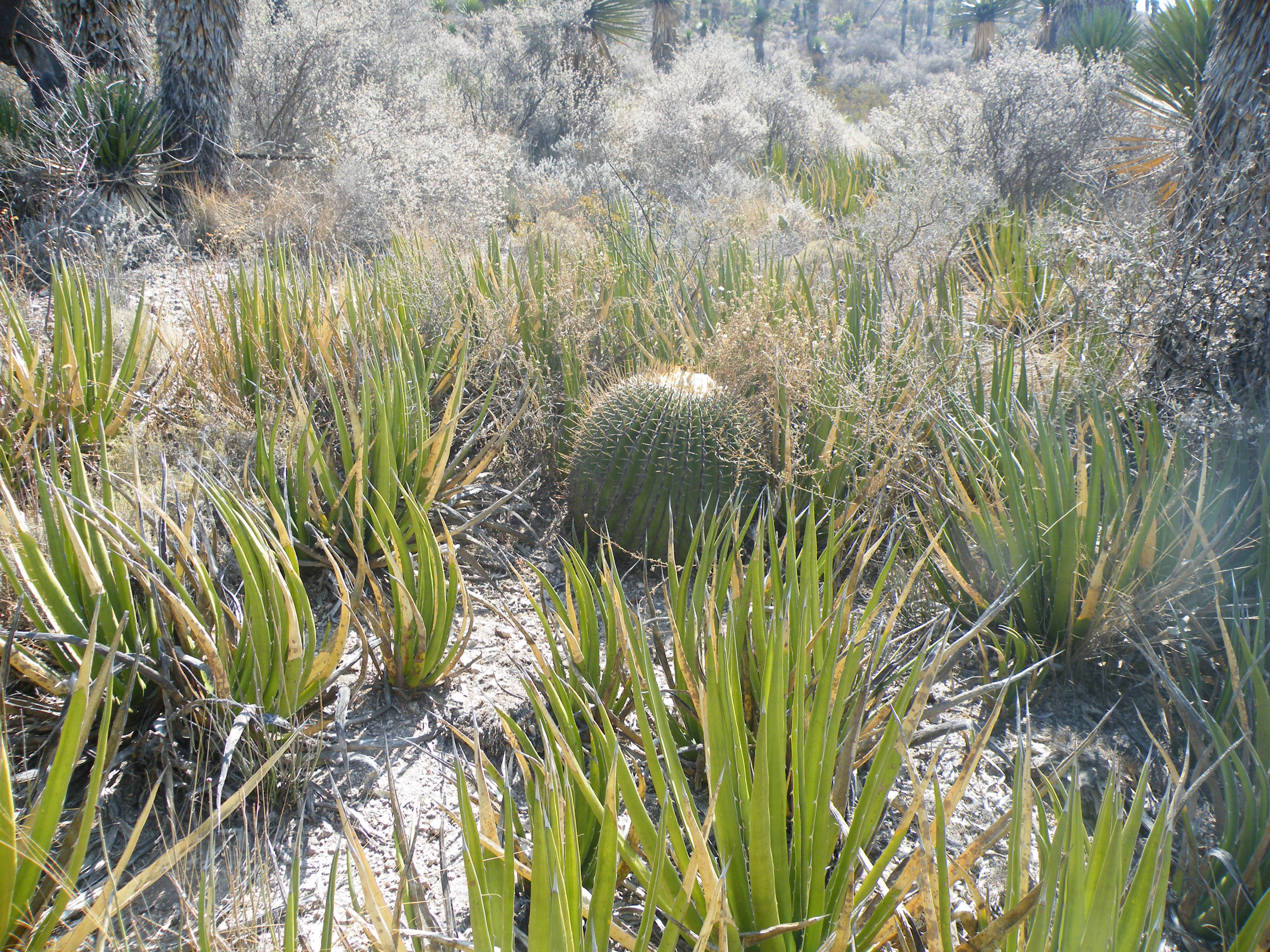
Habitat near Matehuala, San Luis Potosi

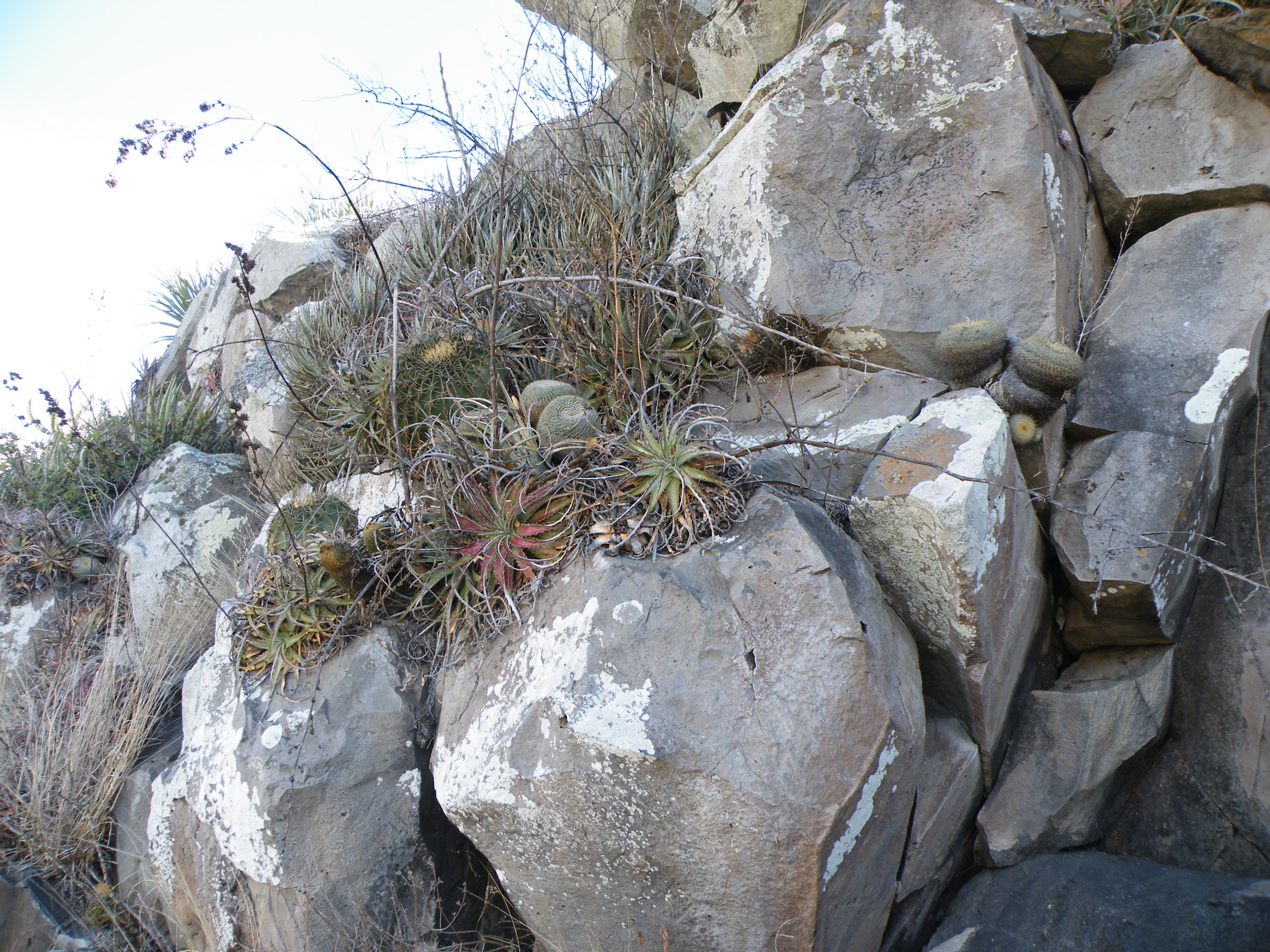
Ferocactus histrix growing in habitat with Mammillaria muehlenpfordtii in San Luis de la Paz in Guanajuato, Mexico

== Taxonomy ==
Ferocactus histrix was first described as Echinocactus histrix in 1828 by Augustin-Pyrame de Candolle. Its specific epithet, "histrix," is derived from Latin and means "hedgehog," referring to the species' thorns. In 1955, George Edmund Lindsay reclassified the species into the genus Ferocactus. Other names for this species are cactus de barril de caramelo, cactus de caramelo, cactus de electrodo and cactus de barril mexicano.
