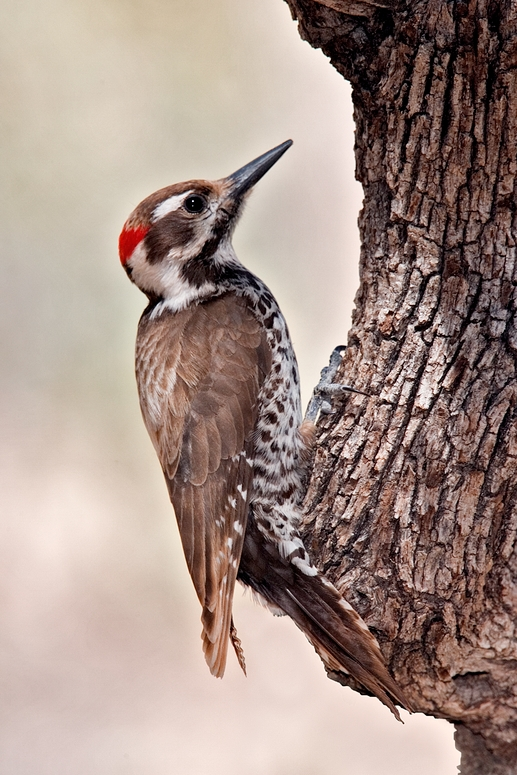

Conservation status
- Least Concern (IUCN 3.1)

Scientific classification
- Kingdom: Animalia
- Phylum: Chordata
- Class: Aves
- Order: Piciformes
- Family: Picidae
- Genus: Leuconotopicus
- Species: L. arizonae

Binomial name
- Leuconotopicus arizonae (Hargitt, 1886)
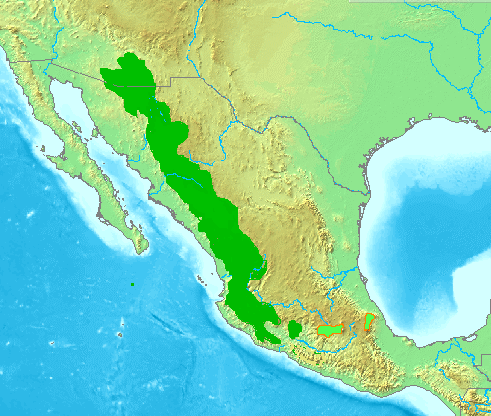

Synonyms
- Picoides arizonae; Dryobates arizonae

= Arizona woodpecker =

Species of bird

The Arizona woodpecker (Leuconotopicus arizonae) is a woodpecker native to southern Arizona and New Mexico and the Sierra Madre Occidental of western Mexico. The species' northernmost range in southeastern Arizona, extreme southwestern New Mexico, and northern Sonora is the region of the Madrean Sky Islands, a region of higher Sonoran Desert mountain ranges.

== Taxonomy ==
This species is known in older field guides as a subspecies of Strickland's woodpecker. The 42nd supplement of the American Ornithologists Union checklist officially split Strickland's woodpecker into two species: the northern population in the Sierra Madre Occidental region (Arizona, L. arizonae) and the southern population in central Mexico (Strickland's, L. stricklandi). Some taxonomic authorities, including the American Ornithological Society, continue to place this species in the genus Picoides.

== Description ==
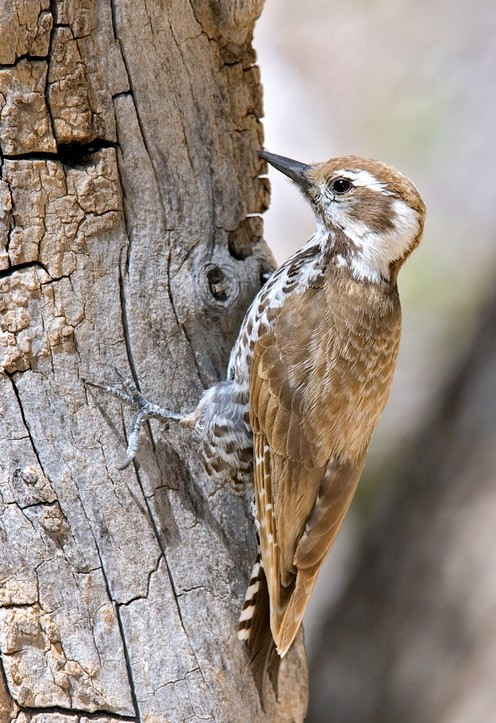
Female

Arizona woodpeckers are nearly identical to Strickland's woodpeckers, growing to be about 7 to 8 inches (18 to 20 cm) in length. Their plumage is mainly brown and white in coloration, brown on top with a dark rump with white underparts speckled with brown spots. Arizona woodpeckers usually have white bars on their wings, and have two white stripes across their face which join with another white bar on their neck. Male Arizona woodpeckers also have a red patch on the nape of their head which is lacking on females.

The call of the Arizona woodpecker is a sharp, squeaky keech, and this species also gives a rattle call of descending, grating notes.
