= Sierra de Juárez =

Mountain range in Baja California, Mexico

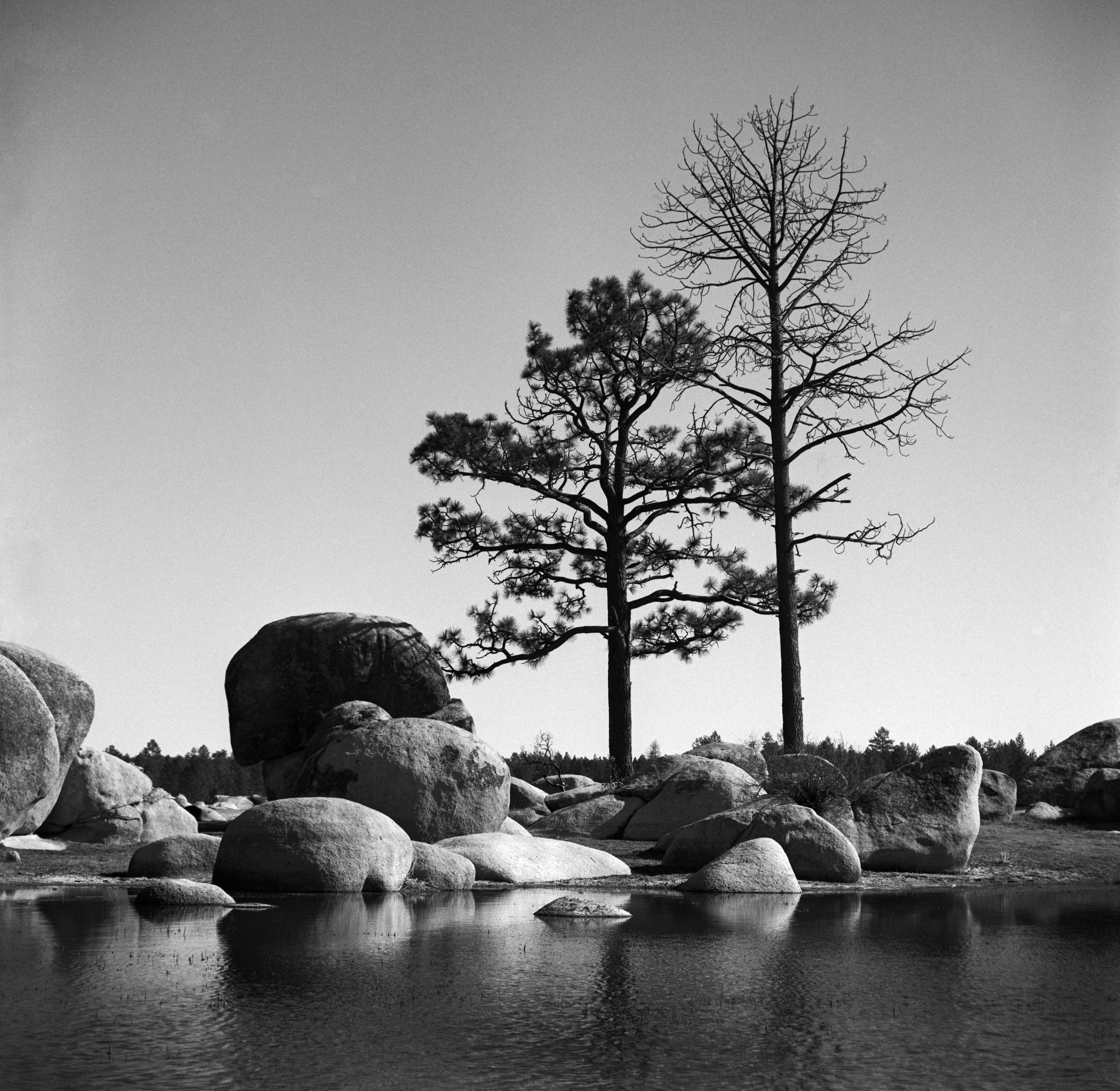
- Laguna Hanson, in Constitution 1857 National Park

Geography
- Location within Baja California Location within Mexico
- Location: Baja California, Mexico
- Range coordinates: 31°18′12″N 115°19′30″W
- Parent range: Peninsular Ranges

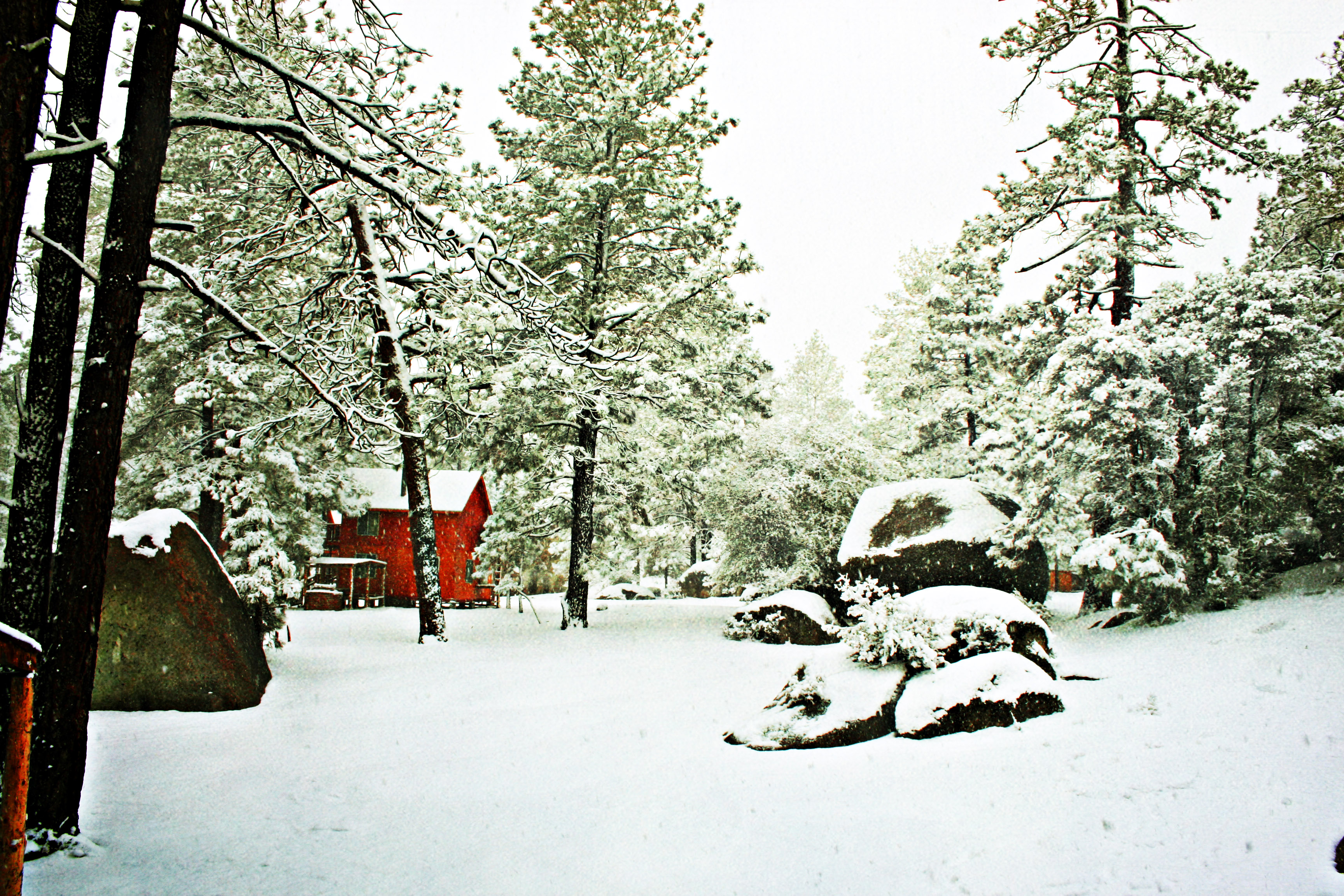
Snow in the Sierra de Juárez.

The Sierra de Juárez, also known as the Sierra Juarez, is a mountain range located in Tecate Municipality and northern Ensenada Municipality, within the northern Baja California state of northwestern Mexico.

It is a major mountain range in the long Peninsular Ranges System, that extends from Southern California down the Baja California peninsula into Baja California Sur state.

== Geography ==
The Sierra de Juárez begins just south of the international frontier with California and extends about 140 kilometres (87 mi) southwards. The highest peak in the range rises to about 1,980 meters (6,500 ft) elevation at 31° 30′ 34″ North Latitude and 115° 32′ 5″ West Longitude. The Laguna Mountains (U.S.) are on the north, and the Sierra de San Pedro Mártir (México) are on the south. The Sierra forms part of the Baja California Peninsular Ranges.

According to the Mexican government agency, CONABIO, the Sierra de Juárez occupies a total area of 4,568 square kilometres (1,764 sq mi) approximately 140 kilometres (87 miles) long and averaging about 33 kilometres (21 miles) wide. On the east the Sierra de Juárez rises sharply from the desert valley containing the Laguna Salada Fault, a southern extension of the San Andreas Fault. The western slope of the Sierra is more gentle.

The range is the location of the southern tip of the Great Basin Divide at a triple watershed point of the Great Basin (northern), the Pacific Ocean (western), and Gulf of California (eastern) watersheds.

A portion of the Sierra de Juárez is protected within Constitution 1857 National Park, approximately 72 kilometres (45 mi) east of Ensenada. The scenic Laguna Hanson, an important stopover for migratory birds, and the endemic pine-oak forests habitat are within the park.

== Ecology ==
The lower elevations of the western slopes of the Sierra de Juárez are in the California coastal sage and chaparral sub−ecoregion of the California chaparral and woodlands ecoregion.

The lower elevations of the eastern slopes are in the Sonoran Desert ecoregion, with its unique desert flora. The California Fan Palm (Washingtonia filifera) is near the southern natural limit of its range in the Sierra de Juárez.

The higher elevations of the Sierra de Juárez, with those of the Sierra San Pedro Mártir, are in the Sierra Juarez and San Pedro Martir pine-oak forests ecoregion. Pine species include Jeffrey pine (Pinus jeffreyi), Parry Piñon pine (Pinus monophylla), lodgepole pine (Pinus contorta), sugar pine (Pinus lambertini). Other evergreen species include white fir (Abies concolor) and incense cedar (Calocedrus decurrens). Sagebrush (Artemisia tridentata) is a common shrub of the understory. The coniferous forests of the two mountain ranges comprise a Sky island--an elevated temperate forest surrounded by lower, more arid lands.

== Climate ==
The western flank of the range lies at the southeastern extremity of the Mediterranean climate region, that extends across much of California and into northwestern Baja California. CONABIO lists the climates (Köppen climate classification) of the Sierra de Juarez as consisting of 30 percent desert (BW), 7 percent steppe (BS), 27 percent mesothermal with precipitation evenly distributed (Cfa, Cfb) throughout the year, and 36 percent Mediterranean (Csa, Csb) with precipitation concentrated in the winter months.

The Laguna Hanson weather station has a Csb climate (warm summers, cool winters, precipitation distributed throughout the year), although the climate at this location verges on being Mediterranean with mostly dry summers. In general, as in most mountain ranges, the lower elevations receive less precipitation and the higher elevations receive more precipitation.

Climate data for Sierra de Juarez (1951-2010) at Laguna Hanson, elevation: 1,580 metres (5,180 ft)
Month	Jan	Feb	Mar	Apr	May	Jun	Jul	Aug	Sep	Oct	Nov	Dec	Year
Record high °C (°F)	25.5 (77.9)	26.0 (78.8)	27.5 (81.5)	33.0 (91.4)	33.5 (92.3)	39.0 (102.2)	39.5 (103.1)	40.0 (104.0)	39.5 (103.1)	35.0 (95.0)	31.0 (87.8)	33.0 (91.4)	40.0 (104.0)
Mean daily maximum °C (°F)	11.7 (53.1)	13.1 (55.6)	12.9 (55.2)	16.0 (60.8)	20.3 (68.5)	24.6 (76.3)	28.4 (83.1)	27.9 (82.2)	25.4 (77.7)	20.0 (68.0)	15.7 (60.3)	13.4 (56.1)	19.1 (66.4)
Daily mean °C (°F)	4.5 (40.1)	5.4 (41.7)	5.7 (42.3)	8.0 (46.4)	11.5 (52.7)	15.1 (59.2)	19.0 (66.2)	18.5 (65.3)	16.2 (61.2)	11.1 (52.0)	7.4 (45.3)	5.4 (41.7)	10.7 (51.3)
Mean daily minimum °C (°F)	−2.7 (27.1)	−2.3 (27.9)	−1.6 (29.1)	0.0 (32.0)	2.7 (36.9)	5.6 (42.1)	9.5 (49.1)	9.1 (48.4)	7.1 (44.8)	2.2 (36.0)	−0.8 (30.6)	−2.4 (27.7)	2.2 (36.0)
Record low °C (°F)	−19.0 (−2.2)	−14.0 (6.8)	−14.0 (6.8)	−13.0 (8.6)	−14.0 (6.8)	−6.0 (21.2)	−7.0 (19.4)	−10.0 (14.0)	−5.0 (23.0)	−12.0 (10.4)	−15.0 (5.0)	−17.0 (1.4)	−19.0 (−2.2)
Average precipitation mm (inches)	51.1 (2.01)	57.0 (2.24)	68.3 (2.69)	22.9 (0.90)	3.9 (0.15)	0.5 (0.02)	33.8 (1.33)	39.9 (1.57)	21.5 (0.85)	17.8 (0.70)	38.1 (1.50)	36.1 (1.42)	390.9 (15.39)
Average precipitation days (≥ 0.1 mm)	4.9	4.6	5.5	2.9	0.8	0.2	3.3	3.8	2.1	2.0	3.4	3.9	37.4
Average snowy days	0.70	0.10	0.90	0.45	0	0	0	0	0	0	0.40	1.60	4.15
Source 1: Servicio Meteorológico Nacional
Source 2: Colegio de Postgraduados

== See also ==
- Constitution 1857 National Park
- Peninsular Ranges topics
- Flora of the California chaparral and woodlands
