= Sacromonte National Park =

National park in the State of Mexico, Mexico

Coordinates: 19°07′42″N 98°46′33″W

- IUCN category II (national park)
- Interactive map of Sacromonte National Park
- Location: State of Mexico, Mexico
- Area: 0.44 km^{2} (0.17 sq mi)
- Established: 1952
- Governing body: National Commission of Natural Protected Areas

Sacromonte National Park is a national park and protected area located in State of Mexico, Mexico. The park was established in 1952 and is approximately 0.44 square kilometres (0.17 sq mi).
