= Quercus resinosa =

Conservation status
- Least Concern (IUCN 3.1)

Scientific classification
- Kingdom: Plantae
- Clade: Embryophytes
- Clade: Tracheophytes
- Clade: Spermatophytes
- Clade: Angiosperms
- Clade: Eudicots
- Clade: Rosids
- Order: Fagales
- Family: Fagaceae
- Genus: Quercus
- Subgenus: Quercus subg. Quercus
- Section: Quercus sect. Quercus
- Species: Q. resinosa

Binomial name
- Quercus resinosa Liebm.

Species of oak tree

Quercus resinosa is a species of white oak. It is native to central and western Mexico, from Nayarit south to Michoacán and east as far as San Luis Potosí. It is placed in Quercus section Quercus.

== Description ==
Quercus resinosa is a deciduous tree growing up to 15 metres (49 feet) tall with a trunk as much as 70 centimetres (28 inches) in diameter. The leaves are huge, as much as 50 cm (20 in) long, thick and stiff, broadly egg-shaped with the widest part toward the tip.
