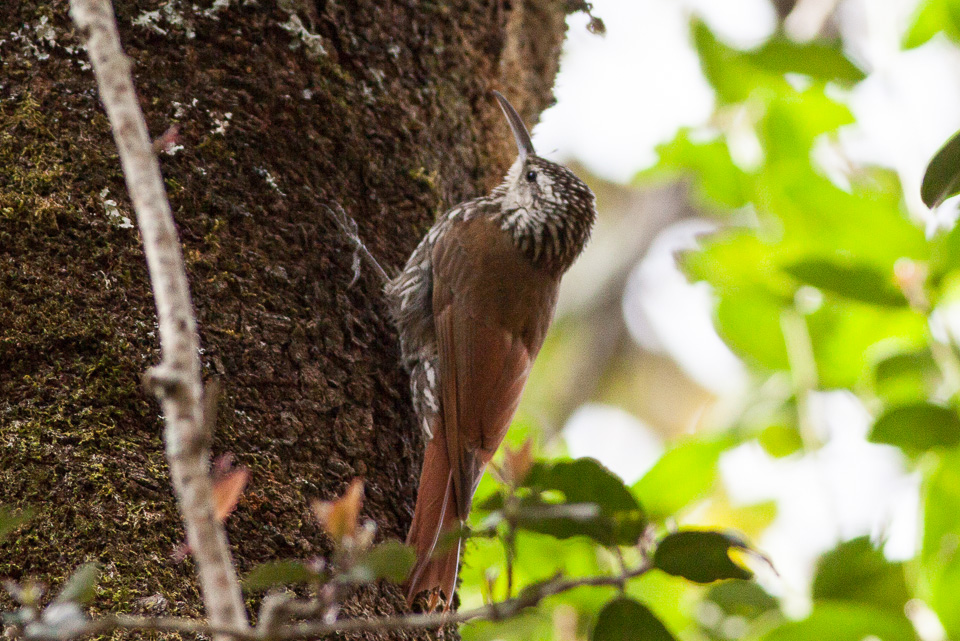

Conservation status
- Least Concern (IUCN 3.1)

Scientific classification
- Kingdom: Animalia
- Phylum: Chordata
- Class: Aves
- Order: Passeriformes
- Family: Furnariidae
- Genus: Lepidocolaptes
- Species: L. leucogaster

Binomial name
- Lepidocolaptes leucogaster (Swainson, 1827)

= White-striped woodcreeper =

Species of bird

The white-striped woodcreeper (Lepidocolaptes leucogaster) is a species of bird in the subfamily Dendrocolaptinae of the ovenbird family Furnariidae. It is endemic to Mexico.

== Taxonomy and systematics ==
The white-striped woodcreeper has two subspecies, the nominate L. l. leucogaster (Swainson, 1827) and L. l. umbrosus (Moore, RT, 1934).

== Description ==
The white-striped woodcreeper is 21.5 to 23.5 cm (8.5 to 9.3 in) long and weighs 30 to 40 g (1.1 to 1.4 oz). It is a slim, medium-sized woodcreeper with a long, slender, decurved bill. The sexes have the same plumage. Adults of the nominate subspecies have a mostly pale face that often has dusky streaks or smudges. They have white to buff-white ear coverts, supercilium, and eyering with a blackish or dusky stripe behind the eye. Their crown, nape, and sides of the neck are blackish to dark brown. Their forehead has buffy to whitish buff spots that become streaks on the crown and nape and usually extend onto the back. Their back and wing coverts are olive-brown or tawny. Their flight feathers, rump, and tail are cinnamon-rufous to rufous-chestnut. Their flight feathers have brownish bases and their primaries have dusky tips. Their throat and breast are white to creamy white; the throat is unmarked and the breast has a blackish scaly appearance. The rest of their underparts are dusky gray with white streaks that fade to the belly. Their underwing coverts are ochraceous buff. Their iris is brown, their maxilla dark brown or blackish, their mandible whitish gray to pinkish, and their legs and feet gray to blackish. Juveniles have more olive-brown upperparts than adults, their underparts' markings are less regular, and their bill is shorter. Subspecies L. l. umbrosus is smaller than the nominate, with whiter spots and streaks on the head and whiter underparts with blacker streaks.

== Distribution and habitat ==
The white-striped woodcreeper occurs only in Mexico. Subspecies L. l. umbrosus is found in northwestern Mexico from Sonora and Chihuahua south to Durango, Nayarit, and Jalisco. The nominate L. l. leucogaster is found in western and southern Mexico. On the Pacific side and interior it occurs from Jalisco and Zacatecas south to Oaxaca, and on the Caribbean side from Veracruz south to Oaxaca. The species mostly inhabits humid montane forest and drier oak, pine-oak, and pine-fir forest in the subtropical and temperate zones. It also occurs in lowland tropical deciduous forest and, at higher elevations, mixed coniferous forest. It favors mature forest but occasionally occurs in secondary forest. In elevation it mostly ranges from 900 to 3,500 m (3,000 to 11,500 ft) but has been recorded as low as 400 m (1,300 ft) and as high as 4,000 m (13,000 ft).

== Behavior ==
=== Movement ===
The white-striped woodcreeper is essentially a year-round resident throughout its range, though some may move to lower elevations in winter.

=== Feeding ===
The white-striped woodcreeper's diet is mostly arthropods. It typically forages singly or in pairs, and often joins mixed-species feeding flocks. It forages at all levels of the forest, hitching in a spiral up trunks and branches. It captures prey by flaking bark and probing into crevices.

=== Breeding ===
The white-striped woodcreeper's breeding season has not been fully defined but includes at least February to May. It apparently nests in tree cavities. Nothing else is known about its breeding biology.

=== Vocalization ===
The white-striped woodcreeper's song is "a sputtering trill...'zzzzzzzzztztztztztzttt-t-t-bt-bt-bt'." Its call is "a short rough trill...'tsisirr'."

== Status ==
The IUCN has assessed the white-striped woodcreeper as being of Least Concern. It has a fairly large range and an estimated population of at least 50,000 mature individuals, though the latter is believed to be decreasing. No immediate threats have been identified. It is considered fairly common to common in the middle elevations though rare elsewhere. It is "[b]elieved to be only moderately sensitive to human disturbance."
