= Tappen =

Tappen may refer to:

Places

- Tappen Park, a park on Staten Island in New York City
- Tappen, North Dakota, a small city in North Dakota
- Tappen, British Columbia, a small city in British Columbia

Games

- Tappen (card game), a 4-player, tarock card game, also known as Dobbm, played in Austria
- Viennese Tappen, a 3-player, tarock card game, also known as Tapp Tarock, played in Austria

People

- Tappen (surname)

Other

- Tappen (biology), an indigestible mass found in the intestines of bears after hibernation
