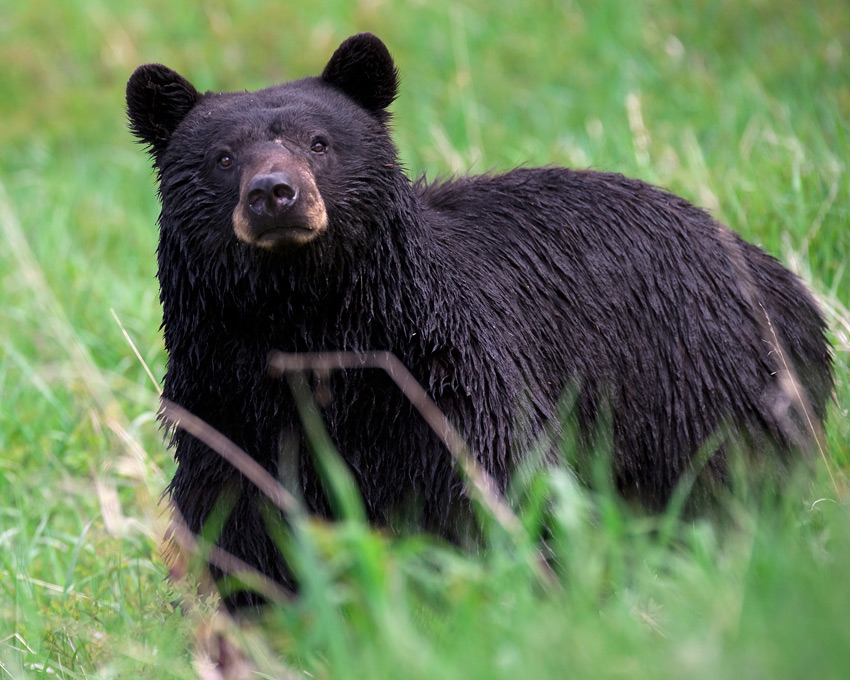

Scientific classification
- Kingdom: Animalia
- Phylum: Chordata
- Class: Mammalia
- Order: Carnivora
- Family: Ursidae
- Genus: Ursus
- Species: U. americanus
- Subspecies: U. a. amblyceps

Trinomial name
- Ursus americanus amblyceps Baird, 1859

= New Mexico black bear =

Subspecies of bear

The New Mexican black bear (Ursus americanus amblyceps), also known as the Colorado or Southwest American black bear, is a subspecies of the American black bear (Ursus americanus) native to the southwestern United States and parts of Northwestern Mexico. It is primarily found throughout the mountainous regions of New Mexico, as well as portions of Arizona, Colorado, Utah and Texas. It is characterized by its stocky build, short tail, rounded ears and powerful limbs. Its coat varies in coloration from black to brown and cinnamon. It is not to be confused with the East Mexican or West Mexican Black Bears, which are separate, distinct subspecies.

== Description ==
This subspecies is a genetically identifiable, medium-to-large mammal characterized by a stocky build, rounded ears, and powerful limbs equipped with long, curved, non-retractable claws. Despite its name, this subspecies exhibits considerable variation in coat coloration with specimens having black, dark brown, light brown, cinnamon, reddish, or blonde coats with cinnamon being a particularly common color phase within New Mexico. The muzzle is generally lighter than the rest of the coat, and a pale patch may occasionally be present on the chest. The New Mexico black bear exhibits pronounced sexual dimorphism, and adult males average approximately 250 pounds (113 kg) though they range generally from 90 to 180 kg, although large individuals may weigh as much as 400 pounds (181 kg) and reach lengths of 170 cm. Adult females typically weigh between 45 and 114 kg, with considerable individual variation and are 150 cm long.

== Behaviour ==
=== Torpor ===
As winter approaches and food becomes less available, New Mexico black bears enter their dens and undergo a period of winter dormancy known as torpor. Although commonly referred to as hibernation, bear dormancy differs from the deeper hibernation of some smaller mammals, as bears can be roused relatively quickly if disturbed and during this stage of torpor, their metabolic rate decreases by approximately 50%, while their heart rate falls to around 12–15 beats per minute. Most bears enter dens between mid-October and mid-November and emerge between April and early May. Females, particularly those with cubs, generally enter dens earlier and emerge later than males. Dens are commonly located beneath tree roots, rock outcroppings, or within hollow trees, and are often lined with vegetation such as leaves, grass, and pine needles.

=== Reproduction ===
Bears of this subspecies generally reach sexual maturity at three to four years of age, and mating typically occurs during May and June, followed by delayed implantation of the fertilized embryo. Females give birth in their winter dens, usually in late January or early February, producing an average of two cubs and they generally reproduce once every two years. Newborn cubs are born blind and covered by a thin layer of fur, weighing approximately 8 ounces. They remain in the den with their mother until late April or early May, when they emerge weighing between 4 to10 pounds and continue nursing throughout the summer, generally remain with their mother through their first winter, sharing her den before becoming independent.

== Range and habitat ==
The New Mexico black bear occurs throughout the forested mountain ranges of New Mexico and extends into neighboring portions of Arizona, Colorado, Utah, Western Texas and parts of Northern Mexico. Within New Mexico, its distribution is concentrated in montane regions, with bears generally absent from the extensive expanses of lower-elevation desert separating these ranges. Its elevational range extends primarily from approximately 4,500 to 11,000 feet (1,370–3,350 m) above sea level. Black bears are primarily associated with closed-canopy, mid to high elevation forests and woodlands, with important habitats for their survival including ponderosa pine, mixed-conifer, and spruce-fir forests, as well as pinyon–juniper woodlands. Oak woodlands and shrublands also provide important food resources and a long-term ecological study conducted in the Sangre de Cristo and Mogollon Mountains between 1992 and 2000 found that closed forests and woodlands accounted for more than 80% of recorded bear locations in both study areas. Open grasslands and open woodlands were generally avoided, with 96% of bear locations recorded in these open habitats occurring within 500 m of the edge of closed-canopy vegetation.

During winter, bears commonly use sheltered locations such as hollow trees, rock cavities, openings beneath tree roots, and excavated dens and n New Mexico, den sites are most frequently associated with mixed-conifer and spruce-fir forests, although they also occur in ponderosa pine forests and piñon-juniper woodlands. Bears may also travel through more open vegetation when moving between forested mountain ranges. Depending on the region of their range, their population density can shift between 16.5 and 25.7 bears/100 km^{2}.

== Conservation ==
The bear is not assessed to be in significant danger of extinction, with its primary threats lying with poaching for it's parts and human - animal conflict over livestock and livestock place. Hunting for the bear is regulated to ensure the population remains healthy.

== Cultural Significance ==
The living ambassador for the U.S. Forest Service's wildfire prevention campaign (which started as a poster illustration in 1944), now popularly known as Smokey Bear, was a three-month-old cub with burned paws after the Capitan Gap fire in New Mexico's Capitan Mountains (Lincoln National Forest).

== See also ==
- List of mammals of the United States
- List of mammals of Mexico
