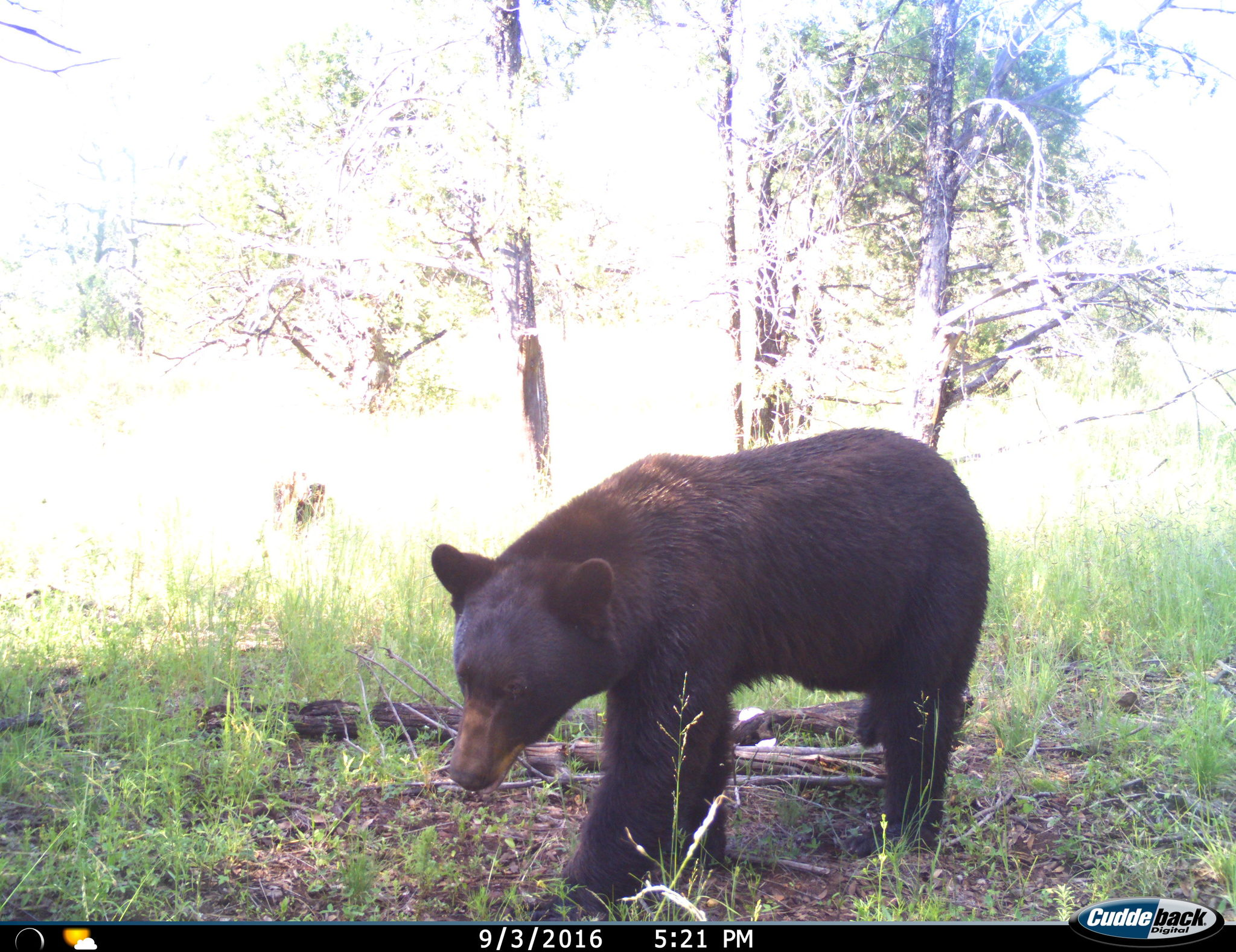

Scientific classification
- Kingdom: Animalia
- Phylum: Chordata
- Class: Mammalia
- Order: Carnivora
- Family: Ursidae
- Genus: Ursus
- Species: U. americanus
- Subspecies: U. a. machetes

Trinomial name
- Ursus americanus machetes Elliot, 1903

= West Mexican black bear =

Subspecies of American black bear

The West Mexican black bear (Ursus americanus machetes), also known as the West Mexico black bear or Sierra Madre Occidental black bear, is a subspecies of American black bear found in Northern Mexico, specifically in the mountainous regions of the Sierra Madre Occidental, particularly in the states of Chihuahua, Durango, Sonora, Sinaloa and Zacatecas. It is not to be confused with the East Mexican black bear (the other primary subspecies found in Mexico) or the New Mexico black bear.

== Description ==
The West Mexican black bear is characterized, like all other American black bears, by a stocky body, relatively short tail, rounded ears and powerful limbs equipped with non-retractable claws. It is about 90 cm (35 in) at the shoulder, making it medium-sized, and the subspecies is sexually dimorphic as all American black bears are. The life span is estimated to be 20 to 25, based on similar subspecies of this species.

== Behaviour ==
Camera-trap monitoring in the Campo Verde Flora and Fauna Protection Area in Chihuahua has documented several behaviours in wild individuals, including bathing in natural pools and springs, scratching and rubbing against trees, and licking rocks, possibly to obtain supplementary minerals submersion in water to cool down and cleaning. It also rubs and marks trees to denote territory. It is not known to hibernate.

=== Reproduction ===
Females have been documented travelling with their offspring with monitoring conducted between 2016 and 2019 in Campo Verde recorded 37 photographic observations of females accompanied by cubs, with approximately two cubs per female on average. Most of its behavioural ecology remains poorly studied, and a lot of what is known about its social structure, activity patterns, and general behaviour is inferred from studies of the American black bear as a whole.

=== Diet ===
It is likely that pine nuts and acorns, alongside roots, bulbs, berries and grasses, form most of the bear's diet. Like other bears, it likely preys on smaller mammals, amphibians, birds, eggs, and reptiles, alongside the anecdotal reports of cattle predation which do not endear it to ranchers.

== Range and habitat ==
The bear inhabits the Sierra Madre Occidental of northwestern Mexico, with its historical range including the southern and southwestern portions of Chihuahua, Durango, southern Sinaloa and northwestern Zacatecas. It is also reported from areas inhabited by the Tepehuán people in southern Durango, with possible occurrences in the neighbouring mountins of Nayarit.

The subspecies inhabits mountainous regions characterized by temperate forests, particularly pine (Pinus) and oak (Quercus) (especially the unique Sierra Madre Occidental pine–oak forests) woodlands but is also associated with mixed forests and other wooded habitats of the Sierra Madre Occidental as these environments provide food resources, shelter and suitable areas for denning.

Its distribution may overlap geographically with that of the New Mexican black bear subspecies particularly in Chihuahua and the Sierra Madre Occidental but the precise boundaries separating the distributions of these subspecies remain uncertain. Historical records indicate that black bears have experienced substantial range reductions in Mexico and it has documented in protected areas such as Campo Verde Flora and Fauna Protection Area in Chihuahua but its current overall distribution remains poorly understood because of limited surveys and occurrence records.

== Conservation ==
Though the American black bear at large is plentiful and classed as "Least Concern" internationally by the IUCN, this subspecies is classified as Endangered (P) under Mexico's environmental protection legislation, specifically NOM-059-SEMARNAT-2010. It is protected under Mexican wildlife conservation regulations due to historical population declines and habitat loss throughout its range in the Sierra Madre Occidental. During the twentieth century, black bear populations in Mexico experienced substantial declines, with their historical distribution estimated to have decreased by approximately 80%. The main causes for this travesty include deforestation, habitat fragmentation, hunting and poisoning, with additional threats comingin the forms of forest fires, road mortality and conflicts with livestock owners and agricultural communities.

Conservation efforts for the West Mexican black bear are primarily coordinated by Mexico's National Commission of Natural Protected Areas (CONANP), through monitoring programmes and habitat protection initiatives in the Sierra Madre Occidental. Important protected areas include Campo Verde Flora and Fauna Protection Area, Tutuaca Flora and Fauna Protection Area and Janos Biosphere Reserve in Chihuahua. Monitoring conducted between 2016 and 2019 estimated approximately 106 individuals within Campo Verde, with a population density of 0.140 individuals per square kilometre, with the monitoring also documented 37 photographic observations of females accompanied by cubs, indicating successful reproduction within the protected area.

Conservation programmes have been implemented in the region since 2012 through the Species Conservation Action Programme (PACE) including monitoring, habitat management and cooperation with local communities, including residents of La Norteña, El Largo and La Gloria. Local participation has been particularly important in improving knowledge of the subspecies and encouraging coexistence between bears and people.

== See also ==
- List of mammals of Mexico
