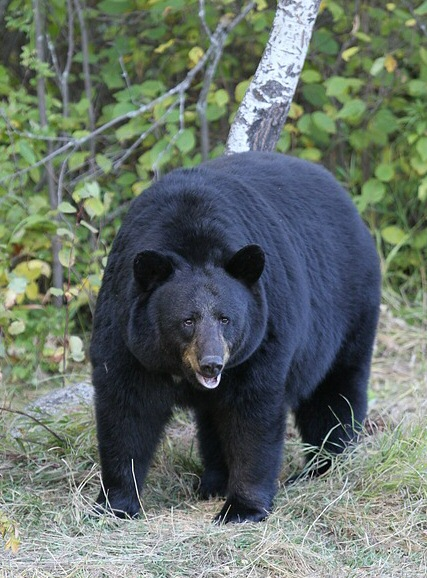
- An American black bear in Manitoba's Riding Mountain National Park

Conservation status
- Least Concern (IUCN 3.1)
- CITES Appendix II

Scientific classification
- Kingdom: Animalia
- Phylum: Chordata
- Class: Mammalia
- Order: Carnivora
- Family: Ursidae
- Genus: Ursus
- Species: U. americanus

Binomial name
- Ursus americanus Pallas, 1780

Subspecies
- 16, see table
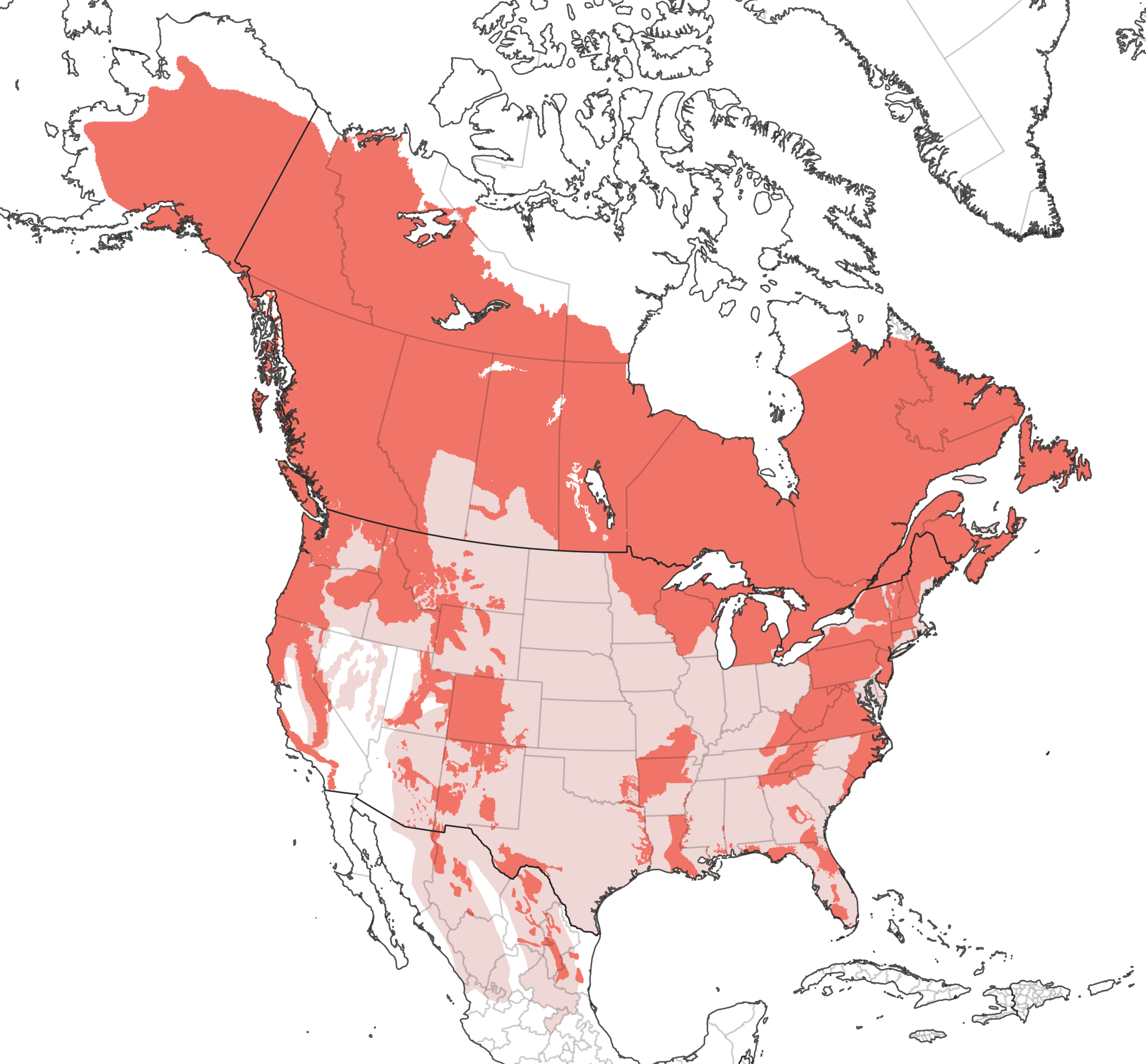
- American black bear range Present‑day range Extirpated

Synonyms
- Euarctos americanus; Ursus (Euarctos) vitabilis Gidley, 1913

= American black bear =

American black bear Temporal range: 2.6–0 Ma Late Pliocene–Holocene

Species of bear

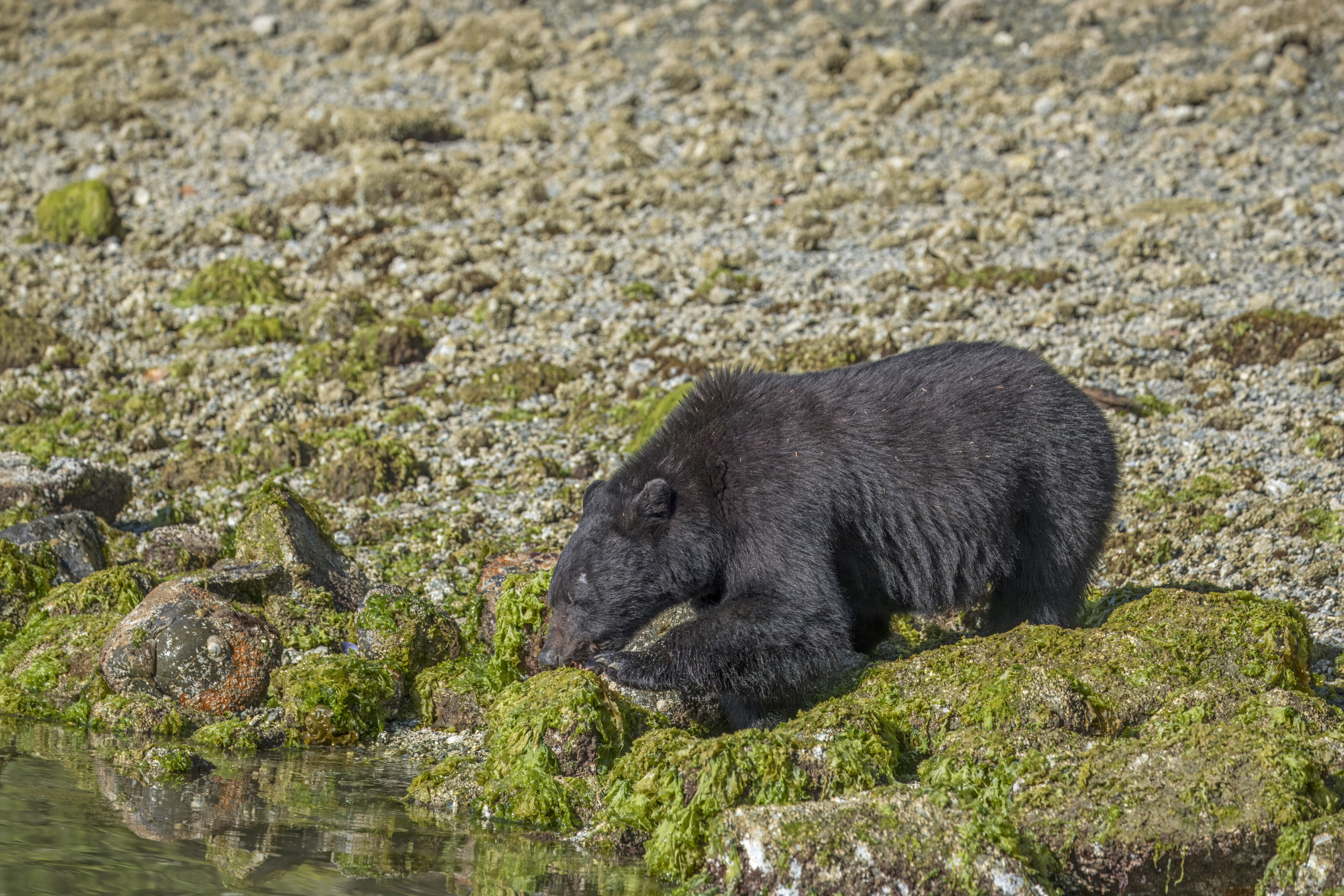
U. a. vancouveri turning over rocks for food at low water

The American black bear (Ursus americanus), or simply black bear, is a species of medium-sized bear which is endemic to North America. It is the continent's smallest and most widely distributed bear species. It is an omnivore, with a diet varying greatly depending on season and location. It primarily inhabits forested regions, but may venture beyond forest boundaries in search of food. Individuals are occasionally drawn to human settlements due to the availability of easily accessible food sources.

The International Union for Conservation of Nature (IUCN) lists the American black bear as a least-concern species because of its widespread distribution and a large population, estimated to be twice that of all other bear species combined. Along with the brown bear (Ursus arctos), it is one of the two modern bear species not considered by the IUCN to be globally threatened with extinction.

== Taxonomy ==
The American black bear is not closely related to the brown bear or polar bear, though all three species are found in North America; genetic studies reveal that they split from a common ancestor 5.05 million years ago (mya). American and Asian black bears are considered sister taxa and are more closely related to each other than to the other modern species of bears.

=== Evolution ===
The ancestors of American black bears and Asian black bears diverged from sun bears 4.58 mya. The American black bear then split from the Asian black bear 4.08 mya. A small, primitive bear genus called protarctos (U. abstrusus) is the oldest known North American fossil member of the genus Ursus, dated to 4.95 mya. This suggests that U. abstrusus may be the direct ancestor of the American black bear, which evolved in North America.

The earliest American black bear fossils, from the Early Pleistocene of Port Kennedy, Pennsylvania, greatly resemble the Asian species, though later specimens grew to sizes comparable to grizzly bears. Once described as a precursor species (Ursus vitabilis), these specimens have been synonymized with U. americanus. The American black bear lived during the same period as the giant and lesser short-faced bears (Arctodus simus and A. pristinus, respectively) and the Florida spectacled bear (Tremarctos floridanus). These tremarctine bears evolved from bears that had emigrated from Asia to the Americas 7–8 mya. The giant and lesser short-faced bears are thought to have been heavily carnivorous and the Florida spectacled bear more herbivorous, while the American black bears remained arboreal omnivores, like their Asian ancestors. From the Holocene to the present, American black bears seem to have shrunk in size, but this has been disputed because of problems with dating these fossil specimens.

The American black bear's generalist behavior allowed it to exploit a wider variety of foods and has been given as a reason why, of these three genera, it alone survived climate and vegetative changes through the last Ice Age while the other, more specialized North American predators became extinct. However, both Arctodus and Tremarctos had survived several other, previous ice ages. After these prehistoric ursids became extinct at the end of the Pleistocene, American black bears, brown bears and polar bears were the only remaining bears in North America.

=== Hybrids ===
American black bears are reproductively compatible with several other bear species and occasionally produce hybrid offspring. According to Jack Hanna's Monkeys on the Interstate, a bear captured in Sanford, Florida, was thought to have been the offspring of an escaped female Asian black bear and a male American black bear. In 1859, an American black bear and a Eurasian brown bear were bred together in the London Zoo, but the three cubs that were born died before they reached maturity. In The Variation of Animals and Plants Under Domestication, Charles Darwin noted:

In the nine-year Report it is stated that the bears had been seen in the zoological gardens to couple freely, but previously to 1848 most had rarely conceived. In the reports published since this date three species have produced young (hybrids in one case), ...

A bear shot in autumn 1986 in Michigan was thought by some to be an American black bear/grizzly bear hybrid, because of its unusually large size and its proportionately larger brain case and skull. DNA testing was unable to determine whether it was a large American black bear or a grizzly bear.

=== Subspecies ===
Sixteen subspecies are traditionally recognized; however, a 2015 genetic study did not support designating some of these, such as the Florida black bear, as distinct subspecies. Listed alphabetically according to subspecific name:

American black bear subspecies
Image	Scientific name	Common name	Distribution	Description
	Ursus americanus altifrontalis	Olympic black bear	the Pacific Northwest coast from central British Columbia through northern California and inland to the tip of northern Idaho and British Columbia	
	Ursus americanus amblyceps	New Mexico black bear	Colorado, New Mexico, western Texas and the eastern half of Arizona into northern Mexico and southeastern Utah	
	Ursus americanus americanus	Eastern black bear	Eastern Montana to the Atlantic coast, from Alaska south and east through Canada to Maine and south to Texas. Thought to be increasing in some regions.	Common to Eastern Canada and the eastern U.S. wherever suitable habitat is found. A large-bodied subspecies; almost all specimens have black fur. May very rarely sport a white blaze on the chest.
	Ursus americanus californiensis	California black bear	the mountain ranges of southern California, north through the Central Valley to southern Oregon	Able to live in varied climates: found in temperate rain forest in the north and chaparral shrubland in the south. Small numbers may feature cinnamon-colored fur.
	Ursus americanus carlottae	Haida Gwaii black bear or Queen Charlotte Islands black bear	Haida Gwaii (formerly the Queen Charlotte Islands) and Alaska	Generally larger than its mainland counterparts with a large skull and molars and found only in a black color phase.
	Ursus americanus cinnamomum	Cinnamon bear	Colorado, Idaho, western Montana and Wyoming, eastern Washington and Oregon and northeastern Utah	Has brown or reddish-brown fur, reminiscent of cinnamon.
	Ursus americanus emmonsii	Glacier bear or blue bear	Southeastern Alaska	Distinguished by its fur being silvery-gray with a blue luster found mostly on its flanks.
	Ursus americanus eremicus	East Mexican black bear	Northeastern Mexico and U.S. borderlands with Texas.	Most often found in Big Bend National Park and the desert border with Mexico. Numbers unknown in Mexico but are presumed to be very low. Critically Endangered.
	Ursus americanus floridanus	Florida black bear	Florida, southern Georgia, Alabama and Mississippi (except the southern region)	Has a light brown nose and shiny black fur. A white blaze on the chest is common in this subspecies. An average male weighs 136 kg (300 lb).
	Ursus americanus hamiltoni	Newfoundland black bear	Newfoundland	Generally bigger than its mainland relatives, ranging in size from 90 to 270 kg (200 to 600 lb) and averaging 135 kg (298 lb). It has one of the longest hibernation periods of any bear in North America. Known to favor foraging in fields of Vaccinium species.
	Ursus americanus kermodei	Spirit bear or island white bear, Kermode bear	the central coast of British Columbia	Approximately 10% of the population of this subspecies have white or cream-colored coats due to a recessive gene. The other 90% appear as normal-colored black bears.
	Ursus americanus luteolus	Louisiana black bear	Eastern Texas, Louisiana and southern Mississippi. The validity of this subspecies has been repeatedly disputed.	Has relatively long, narrow and flat skull and proportionately large molars. Prefers bottomland forests and bayous as habitat.
	Ursus americanus machetes	West Mexican black bear	north-central Mexico	
	Ursus americanus perniger	Kenai black bear	the Kenai Peninsula, Alaska	Considered an "Apparently Secure Subspecies" by NatureServe.
	Ursus americanus pugnax	Dall Island black bear	Dall Island in the Alexander Archipelago, Alaska	
	Ursus americanus vancouveri	Vancouver Island black bear	Vancouver Island, British Columbia	Darker and slightly bigger than the other five subspecies found in British Columbia; it is most common in the north, but appears occasionally in the southern parts of Vancouver Island.

== Distribution and population ==
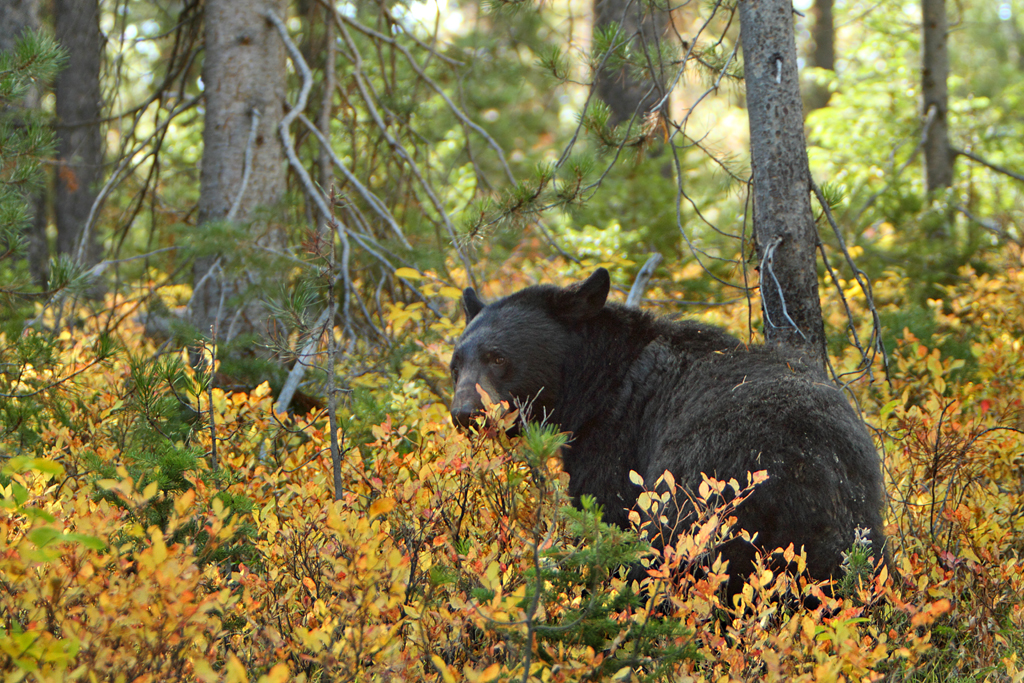
An American black bear at Grand Teton National Park, Wyoming

Historically, American black bears occupied the majority of North America's forested regions. Today, they are primarily limited to sparsely settled, forested areas. American black bears currently inhabit much of their original Canadian range, though they seldom occur in the southern farmlands of Alberta, Saskatchewan and Manitoba; they have been extirpated on Prince Edward Island since 1937. Surveys taken in the mid-1990s found the Canadian black bear population to be between 396,000 and 476,000 in seven provinces; this estimate excludes populations in New Brunswick, the Northwest Territories, Nova Scotia and Saskatchewan. All provinces indicated stable populations of American black bears over the 2000s.

The current range in the United States is constant throughout most of the Northeast and within the Appalachian Mountains almost continuously from Maine to northern Georgia, the northern Midwest, the Rocky Mountain region, the West Coast and Alaska. However, it becomes increasingly fragmented or absent in other regions. Despite this, American black bears in those areas seem to have expanded their range in recent decades, such as with sightings in Ohio, Illinois, southern Indiana, and western Nebraska. Sightings of itinerant black bears in the Driftless Area of southeastern Minnesota, northeastern Iowa, and southwestern Wisconsin are common. In 2019, biologists with the Iowa Department of Natural Resources confirmed documentation of an American black bear living year-round in woodlands near the town of Decorah in northeastern Iowa, believed to be the first instance of a resident black bear in Iowa since the 1880s.

Surveys taken from 35 states in the early 1990s indicated that American black bear populations were either stable or increasing, except in Idaho and New Mexico. The population in the United States was estimated to range between 339,000 and 465,000 in 2011, though this estimate does not include data from Alaska, Idaho, South Dakota, Texas or Wyoming, whose populations were not recorded in the survey. California has the largest population of the species in any of the 48 contiguous United States. The estimated 25,000-35,000 black bears in 2017 grew to 60,000 by 2026. In 2020 there were about 1,500 bears in Great Smoky Mountains National Park, where the population density is about two per square mile. In western North Carolina, the black bear population has increased from about 3,000 in the early 2000s to over 8,000 in the 2020s.

As of 1993, known black bear populations in Mexico existed in four areas, though knowledge on the distribution of populations outside those areas has not been updated since 1959. Mexico is the only country where the species is classified as "endangered".

== Habitat ==
Throughout their range, habitats preferred by American black bears have a few shared characteristics. They are often found in areas with relatively inaccessible terrain, thick understory vegetation and large quantities of edible material (especially masts). The adaptation to woodlands and thick vegetation in this species may have originally been because the bear evolved alongside larger, more aggressive bear species, such as the extinct giant short-faced bear and the grizzly bear, that monopolized more open habitats and the historic presence of larger predators, such as Smilodon and the American lion, that could have preyed on black bears. Although found in the largest numbers in wild, undisturbed areas and rural regions, American black bears can adapt to surviving in some numbers in peri-urban regions, as long as they contain easily accessible foods and some vegetative coverage.

In most of the contiguous United States, American black bears today are usually found in heavily vegetated mountainous areas, from 400 to 3,000 m (1,300 to 9,800 ft) in elevation. For American black bears living in the American Southwest and Mexico, habitat usually consists of stands of chaparral and Pinyon–juniper woodlands. In this region, bears occasionally move to more open areas to feed on prickly pear cactus. At least two distinct, prime habitat types are inhabited in the Southeastern United States. American black bears in the southern Appalachian Mountains survive in predominantly oak-hickory and mixed mesophytic forests. In the coastal areas of the southeast (such as Florida, the Carolinas and Louisiana), bears inhabit a mixture of flatwoods, bays and swampy hardwood sites.

In the northeastern part of the range (the United States and Canada), prime habitat consists of a forest canopy of hardwoods such as beech, maple, birch and coniferous species. Corn crops and oak-hickory mast are also common sources of food in some sections of the northeast; small, thick swampy areas provide excellent refuge cover largely in stands of white cedar. Along the Pacific coast, redwood, Sitka spruce and hemlocks predominate as overstory cover. Within these northern forest types are early successional areas important for American black bears, such as fields of brush, wet and dry meadows, high tidelands, riparian areas and a variety of mast-producing hardwood species. The spruce-fir forest dominates much of the range of the American black bear in the Rockies. Important non-forested areas here are wet meadows, riparian areas, avalanche chutes, roadsides, burns, sidehill parks and subalpine ridgetops.

In areas where human development is relatively low, such as stretches of Canada and Alaska, American black bears tend to be found more regularly in lowland regions. In parts of eastern Canada, especially Labrador, American black bears have adapted exclusively to semi-open areas that are more typical habitat in North America for brown bears (likely due to the absence there of brown and polar bears, as well as other large carnivore species).

== Description ==
=== Build ===
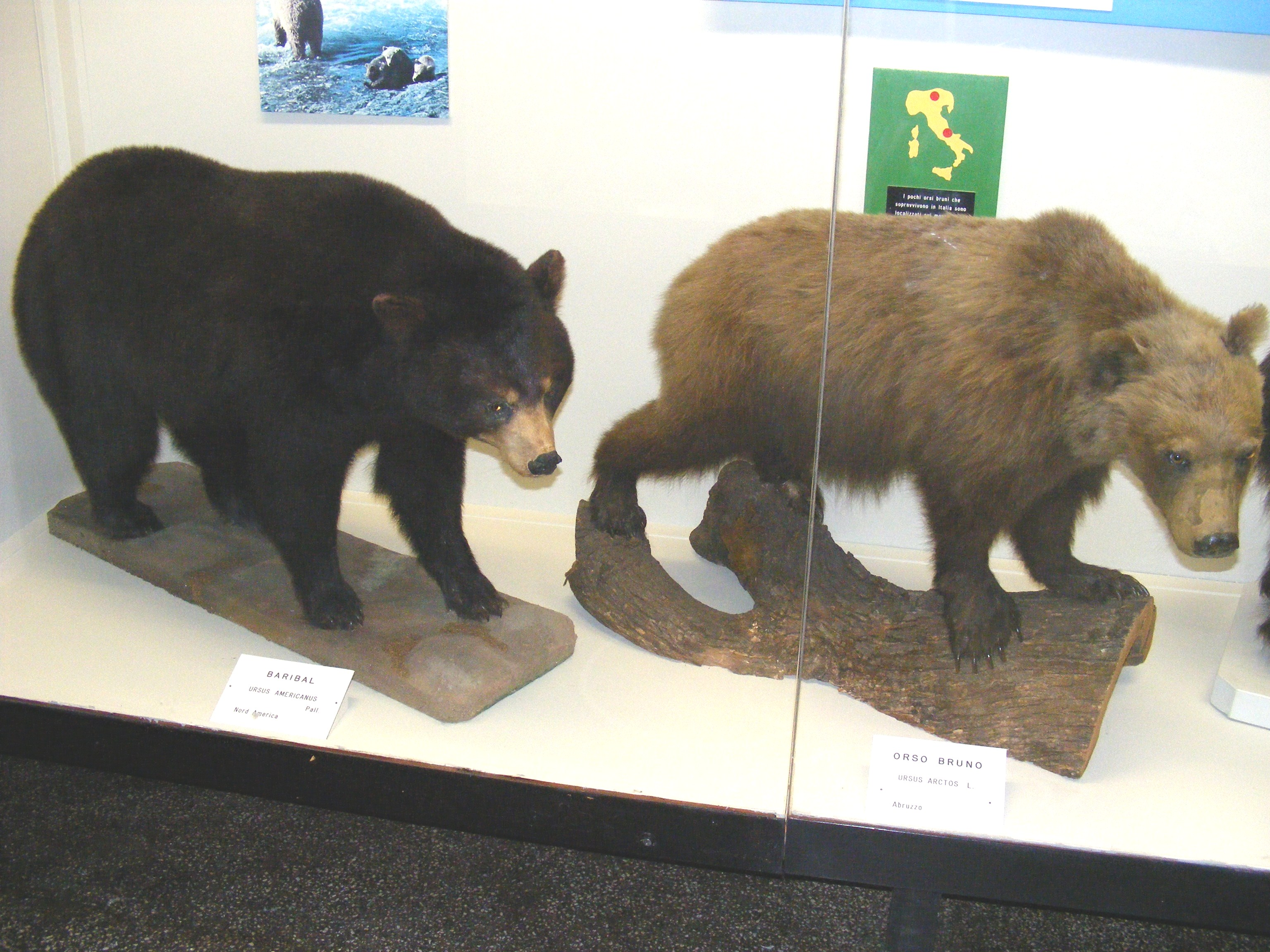
American black bears can be distinguished from brown bears by their smaller size, their less concave skull profiles, their shorter claws and the lack of a shoulder hump.

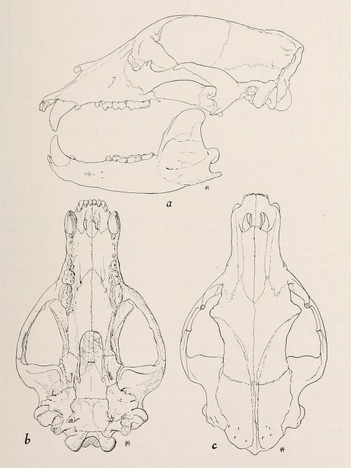
Sketch of an American black bear skull showing top, bottom and lateral aspects.

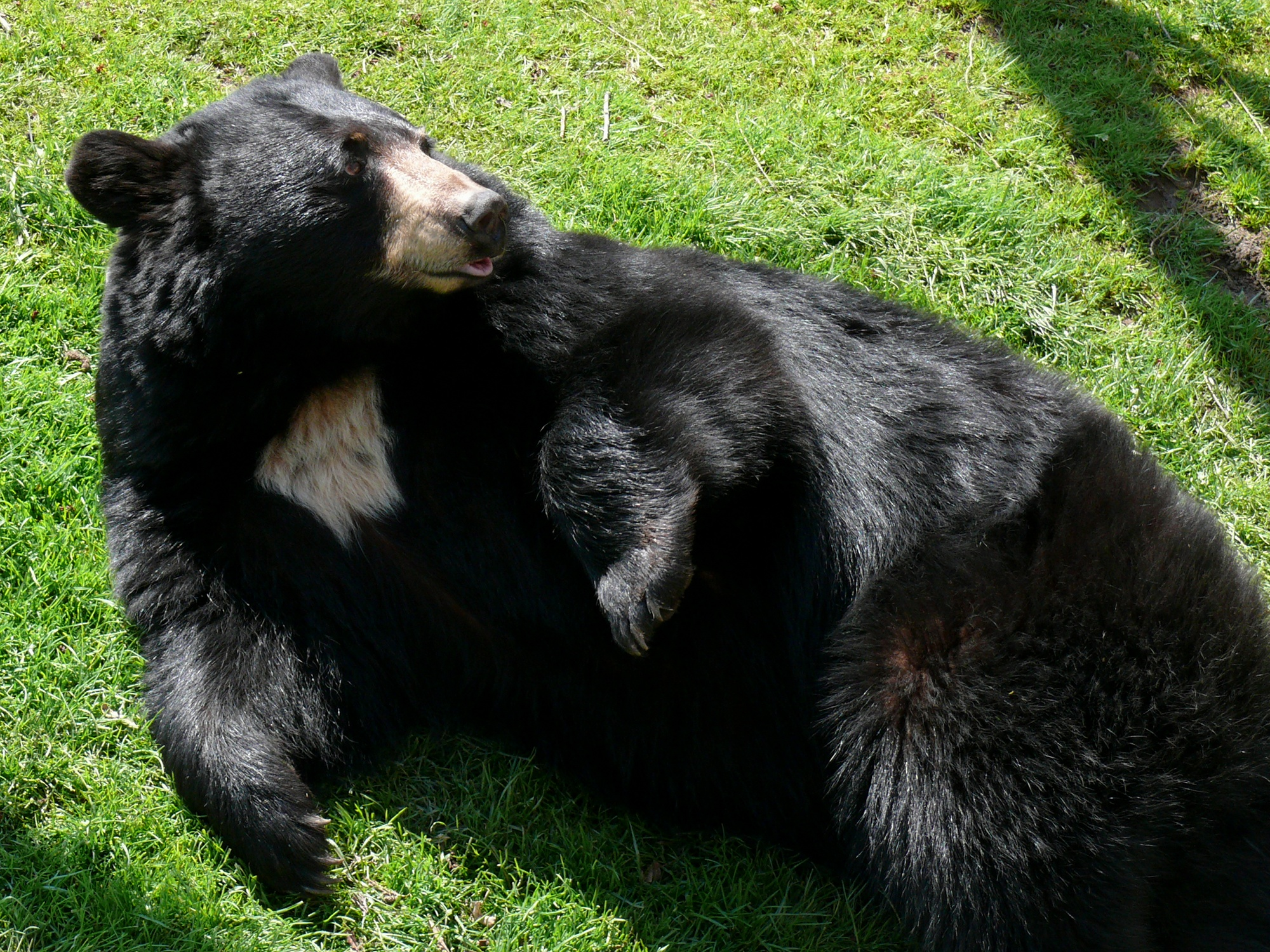
Some individuals develop a white "crescent moon" blaze on the chest. This blaze, which is constant in Asian black bears, occurs in up to 80% of American black bear cubs, but only persists into adulthood for approx. 25%.

The skulls of American black bears are broad, with narrow muzzles and large jaw hinges. In Virginia, the length of adult bear skulls was found to average 26.2 to 31.7 cm (10.3 to 12.5 in). Across its range, the longest reported skull measured from 23.5 to 35 cm (9.3 to 13.8 in). Sexual dimorphism can be seen in the tendency for females to have slenderer and more pointed faces, and conversely, for larger cheek teeth in males.

Their claws are short and curved, being thickest at the base then tapering to a point, and most often black or grayish-brown in color. Claws from both hind and front legs are almost identical in length, though the curvature of foreclaws tends to be greater. The paws of the species are relatively large, with the forepaws measuring 2.1–5.3 inches long (5.3–13.5 cm) by 2.1–5.6 inches wide (5.3–14.2 cm) and the hindpaws 2.8–8 in long (7.1–20.3 cm) by 2.5–6.9 inches wide (6.4–17.5 cm), which is proportionately larger than other medium-sized bear species, but markedly smaller than those of large adult brown bears, and even more so, polar bears. The soles of the feet are black or brownish and are naked, leathery and deeply wrinkled.

The hind legs are relatively longer than those of Asian black bears. The typically small tail is 7.7–17.7 cm long (3.0–7.0 in). The ears are small and rounded, as well as being set well back on the head.

American black bears are highly dexterous, being capable of opening screw cap containers and manipulating door latches. They also have great physical strength; a bear weighing 120 lb (54 kg) was observed flipping over flat rocks weighing 310 to 325 lb (141 to 147 kg) with a single foreleg. They move with a rhythmic, sure-footed gait and can run at speeds of up to 25–30 mph (40–48 km/h). American black bears have good eyesight and have been proven experimentally to be able to learn visual color discrimination tasks faster than chimpanzees and just as fast as domestic dogs. They are also capable of rapidly learning to distinguish different shapes, such as small triangles, circles and squares.

=== Size ===
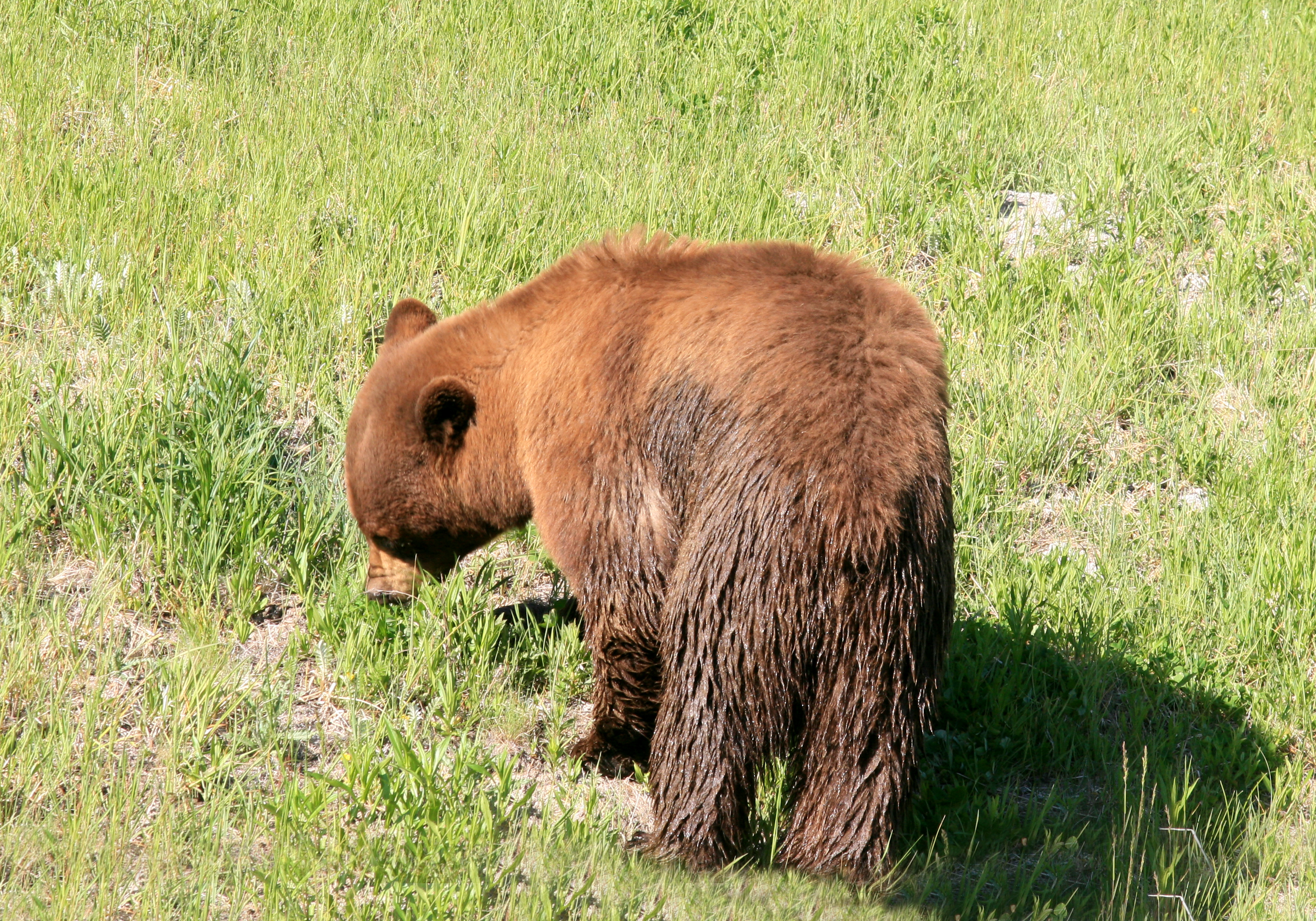
A cinnamon-colored American black bear in Yellowstone National Park, the U.S.

Adults typically range from 120 to 188 cm (47 to 74 in) in head-and-body length, and 63 to 103.5 cm (24.8 to 40.7 in) in shoulder height. Although the American black bear is the smallest bear species in North America (smaller than the brown and polar bears), large males exceed the size of other bear species in other continents.

Weight tends to vary according to age, sex, health and season. Adult males typically weigh between 60–300 kg (130–660 lb) with females averaging between 33% and 50% less at 40–150 kg (88–331 lb). Seasonal variation in weight is very pronounced: in autumn, their pre-den weight tends to be 30% higher than in spring, when black bears emerge from their dens. Bears on the East Coast tend to be heavier on average than their West Coast counterparts, although they typically follow Bergmann's rule regarding average size being inversely correlated with environment temperature, and bears from the northwest are often slightly heavier than the bears from the southeast.

In California, studies indicate that the average adult mass is 86 kg (190 lb) in males and 58 kg (128 lb) in females. Adults in Yukon Flats National Wildlife Refuge in east-central Alaska were found to average 87.3 kg (192 lb) in males and 63.4 kg (140 lb) in females, whereas on Kuiu Island in southeastern Alaska (where nutrient dense salmon are readily available) adults averaged 115 kg (254 lb). In Great Smoky Mountains National Park, adult males averaged 112 kg (247 lb) and adult females averaged 47 kg (104 lb) per one study.

In one of the largest studies on regional body mass, bears in British Columbia averaged 73.7 kg (162 lb) in 89 females and 103.1 kg (227 lb) in 243 males. In Yellowstone National Park, a study found that adult males averaged 119 kg (262 lb) and adult females averaged 67 kg (148 lb). Black bears in north-central Minnesota averaged 70 kg (150 lb) in 163 females and 125 kg (276 lb) in 77 males. In New York, the males average 136 kg (300 lb) and females 72.6 kg (160 lb). It was found in Nevada and the Lake Tahoe region that bears closer to urban regions were significantly heavier than their arid-country dwelling counterparts, with males near urban areas averaging 138 kg (304 lb) against wild-land males which averaged 115.5 kg (255 lb) whereas peri-urban females averaged 97.9 kg (216 lb) against the average of 65.2 kg (144 lb) in wild-land ones. In Waterton Lakes National Park, Alberta, adults averaged 125 to 128 kg (276 to 282 lb).

The biggest wild American black bear ever recorded was a male from New Brunswick, shot in November 1972, that weighed 409 kg (902 lb) after it had been dressed, meaning it weighed an estimated 500 kg (1,100 lb) in life and measured 2.41 m (7 ft 11 in) long. Another notably outsized wild American black bear, weighing in at 408 kg (899 lb), was the cattle-killer shot in December 1921 on the Moqui Reservation in Arizona. The record-sized American black bear from New Jersey was shot in Morris County December 2011 and scaled 376.5 kg (830 lb). The Pennsylvania state record weighed 399 kg (880 lb) and was shot in November 2010 in Pike County. The North American Bear Center, located in Ely, Minnesota, is home to the world's largest captive male and female American black bears. Ted, the male, weighed 431–453.5 kg (950–1,000 lb) in the fall of 2006. Honey, the female, weighed 219.6 kg (484 lb) in the fall of 2007.

=== Pelage ===
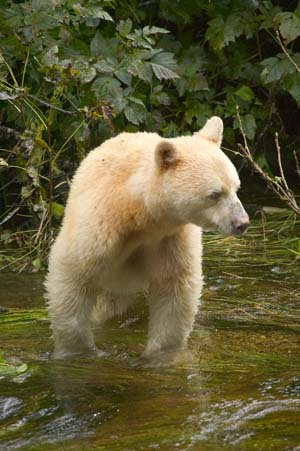
A white-colored spirit bear (Ursus americanus kermodei)

The fur is soft, with dense underfur and long, coarse, thick guard hairs. The fur is not as shaggy or coarse as that of brown bears. American black bear skins can be distinguished from those of Asian black bears by the lack of a white blaze on the chest and hairier footpads.

Despite their name, black bears show a great deal of color variation. Individual coat colors can range from white, blonde, cinnamon, light brown or dark chocolate brown to jet black, with many intermediate variations existing. Silvery-gray American black bears with a blue luster (found mostly on the flanks) occur along a portion of coastal Alaska and British Columbia. White to cream-colored American black bears occur in the coastal islands and the adjacent mainland of southwestern British Columbia. Albino individuals have also been recorded. Black coats tend to predominate in humid areas, such as Maine, New England, New York, Tennessee, Michigan and western Washington. Approximately 70% of all American black bears are black, though only 50% in the Rocky Mountains are black. Many in northwestern North America are cinnamon, blonde or light brown in color and thus may sometimes be mistaken for grizzly bears. Grizzly (and other types of brown) bears can be distinguished by their shoulder hump, larger size and broader, more concave skull.

In his book The Great Bear Almanac, Gary Brown summarized the predominance of black or brown/blonde specimens by location:

Color variations of American black bears by location
Location	Color breakdown
Michigan	100% black
Minnesota	94% black, 6% brown
New England	100% black
New York	100% black
Tennessee	100% black
Washington (coastal)	99% black, 1% brown or blonde
Washington (inland)	21% black, 79% brown or blonde
Yosemite National Park	9% black, 91% brown or blonde

== Behavior and life history ==
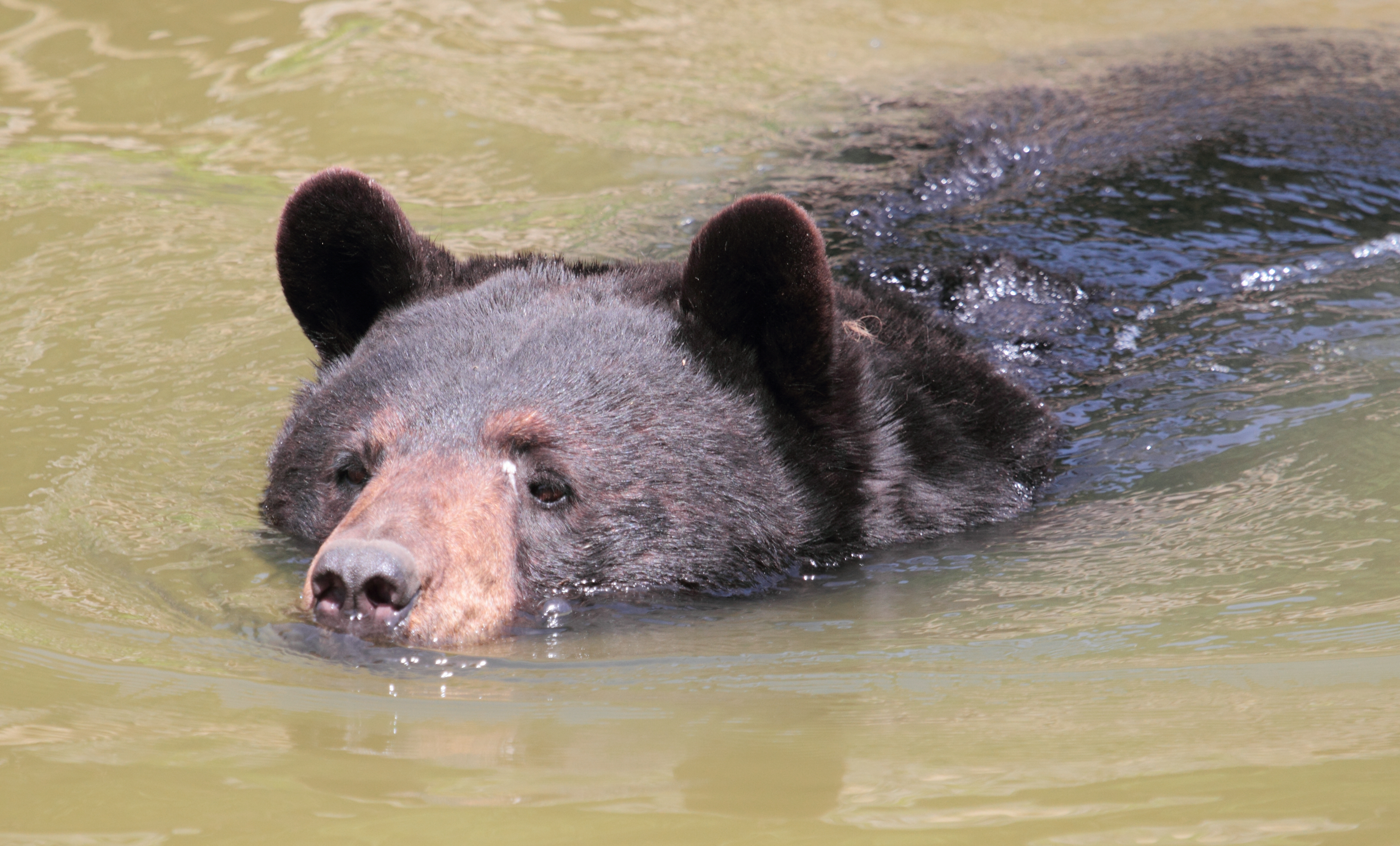
A swimming bear

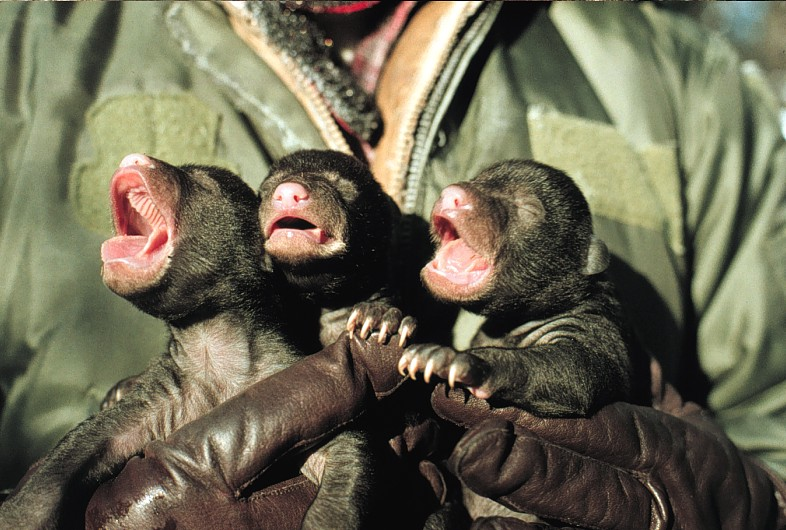
Three newborn cubs

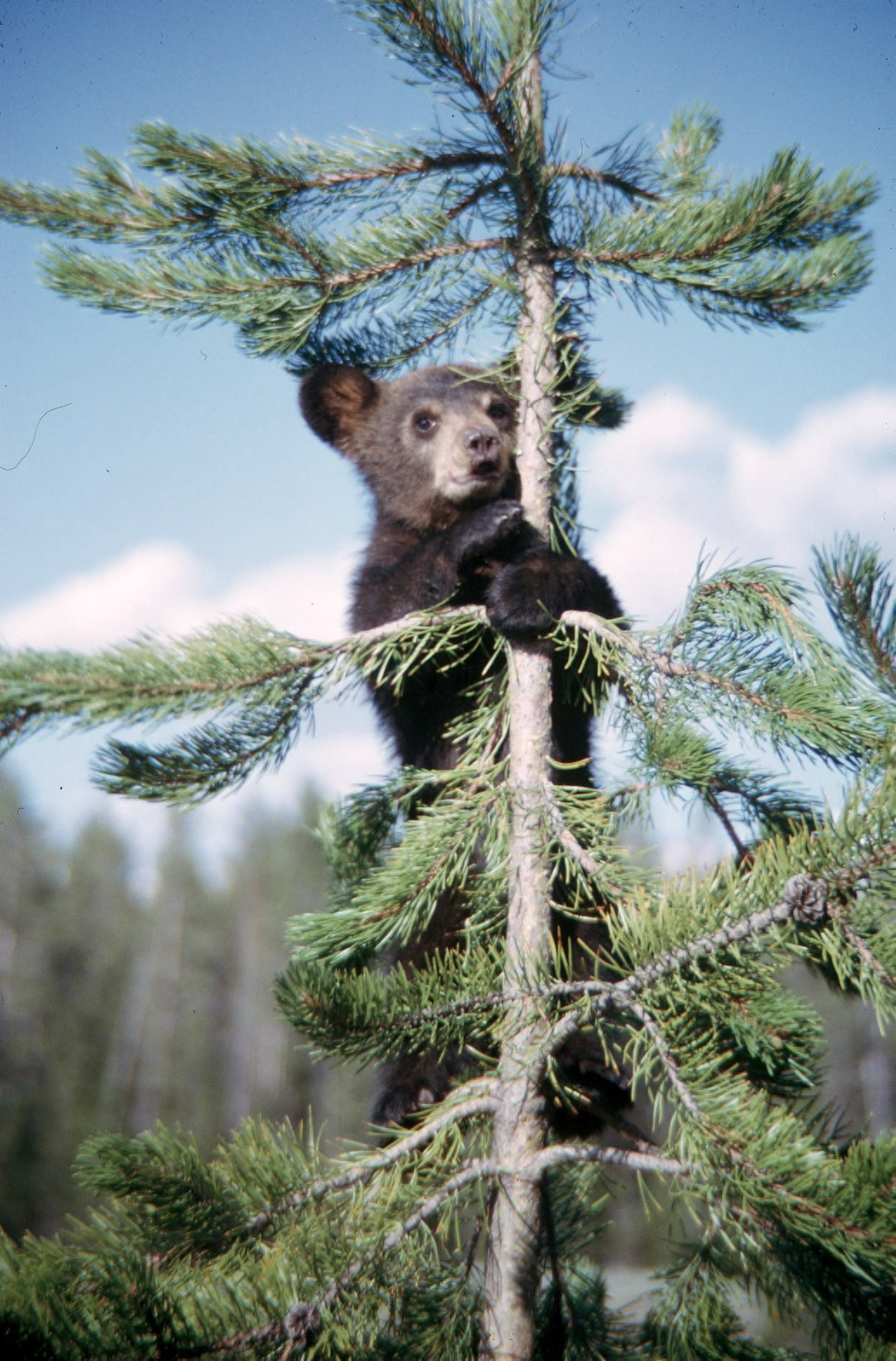
Cub climbing a tree

Their keenest sense is smell, which is about seven times more sensitive than a domestic dog's. They are excellent and strong swimmers, swimming for pleasure and to feed (largely on fish). They regularly climb trees to feed, escape enemies and hibernate. Four of the eight modern bear species are habitually arboreal (the most arboreal species, the American and Asian black bears and the sun bear, being fairly closely related). Their arboreal abilities tend to decline with age. They may be active at any time of the day or night, although they mainly forage by night. Bears living near human habitations tend to be more extensively nocturnal, while those living near brown bears tend to be more often diurnal.

American black bears tend to be territorial and non-gregarious in nature. However, at abundant food sources (e.g. spawning salmon or garbage dumps), they may congregate and dominance hierarchies form, with the largest, most powerful males dominating the most fruitful feeding spots. They mark their territories by rubbing their bodies against trees and clawing at the bark. Annual ranges held by mature male bears tend to be very large, though there is some variation. On Long Island off the coast of Washington, ranges average 5 sq mi (13 km^{2}), whereas on the Ungava Peninsula in Canada ranges can average up to 1,000 sq mi (2,600 km^{2}), with some male bears traveling as far as 4,349 sq mi (11,260 km^{2}) at times of food shortages.

Bears may communicate with various vocal and non-vocal sounds. Tongue-clicking and grunting are the most common sounds and are made in cordial situations to conspecifics, offspring and occasionally humans. When at ease, they produce a loud rumbling hum. During times of fear or nervousness, bears may moan, huff or blow air. Warning sounds include jaw-clicking and lip-popping. In aggressive interactions, black bears produce guttural pulsing calls that may sound like growling. Cubs squeal, bawl or scream when anxious and make a motor-like humming sound when comfortable or nursing. American black bears often mark trees using their teeth and claws as a form of communication with other bears, a behavior common to many species of bears.

=== Reproduction and development ===
Sows usually produce their first litter at the age of 3 to 5 years, with those living in more developed areas tending to get pregnant at younger ages. The breeding period usually occurs in the June–July period, though it can extend to August in the species' northern range. The breeding period lasts for two to three months. Both sexes are promiscuous. Males try to mate with several females, but large, dominant ones may violently claim a female if another mature male comes near. Copulation can last 20–30 minutes. Sows tend to be short-tempered with their mates after copulating.

The fertilized eggs undergo delayed development and do not implant in the female's womb until November. The gestation period lasts 235 days, and litters are usually born in late January to early February. Litter size is between one and six cubs, typically two or three. At birth, cubs weigh 280–450 g (0.62–0.99 lb) and measure 20.5 cm (8.1 in) in length. They are born with fine, gray, down-like hair and their hind quarters are underdeveloped. They typically open their eyes after 28–40 days and begin walking after 5 weeks. Cubs are dependent on their mother's milk for 30 weeks and will reach independence at 16–18 months. At 6 weeks, they attain 900 g (2.0 lb), by 8 weeks they reach 2.5 kg (5.5 lb) and by 6 months they weigh 18 to 27 kg (40 to 60 lb). They reach sexual maturity at 3 years and attain their full growth at 5 years.

=== Longevity and mortality ===
A female with cubs in Parc Omega, Quebec

The average lifespan in the wild is 18 years, and it is quite possible for wild individuals to survive for more than 23 years. The record age of a wild individual was 39 years, while that in captivity was 44 years. The average annual survival rate is variable, ranging from 86% in Florida to 73% in Virginia and North Carolina. In Minnesota, 99% of wintering adult bears were able to survive the hibernation cycle in one study. A study of American black bears in Nevada found that the amount of annual mortality of a population of bears in wilderness areas was 0%, whereas in developed areas in the state this figure rose to 83%. Survival in subadults is generally less assured. In Alaska 14–17% of subadult males and 30–48% of subadult females were found in a study to survive to adulthood. Across the range, the estimated number of cubs who survive past their first year is 60%.

With the exception of the rare confrontation with an adult brown bear or a gray wolf pack, adult black bears are not usually subject to natural predation. Scats with fur inside of them and a carcass of an adult sow with puncture marks in the skull indicate black bears may occasionally be killed by jaguars in the southern parts of their range. In such scenarios, the big cat would have the advantage if it ambushed the bear, killing it with a crushing bite to the back of the skull. Cubs tend to be more vulnerable to predation than adults, with known predators including bobcats, coyotes, cougars, gray wolves, brown bears and other bears of their own species. Many of these will stealthily snatch small cubs right from under the sleeping mother. There is record of a golden eagle snatching a yearling cub. Once out of hibernation, mother bears may be able to fight off most potential predators. Even cougars will be displaced by an angry mother bear if they are discovered stalking the cubs. Flooding of dens after birth may also occasionally kill newborn cubs. Bear fatalities are mainly attributable to human activities. Seasonally, thousands of black bears are hunted legally across North America, and some are illegally poached or trapped unregulated. Auto collisions also may kill many black bears annually.

=== Hibernation ===
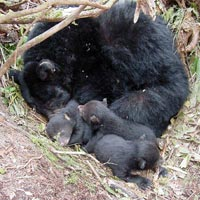
A female and cubs hibernating

American black bears were once not considered true or "deep" hibernators, but because of discoveries about the metabolic changes that allow black bears to remain dormant for months without eating, drinking, urinating or defecating, most biologists have redefined mammalian hibernation as "specialized, seasonal reduction in metabolism concurrent with scarce food and cold weather". American black bears are now considered highly efficient hibernators. The physiology of American black bears in the wild is closely related to that of bears in captivity. Understanding the physiology of bears in the wild is vital to the bear's success in captivity.

The bears enter their dens in October and November, although in the southernmost areas of their range (i.e. Florida, Mexico, the southeastern United States), only pregnant females and mothers with yearling cubs will enter hibernation. Prior to that time, they can put on up to 14 kg (30 lb) of body fat to get them through the several months during which they fast. Hibernation typically lasts 3–8 months, depending on regional climate.

Hibernating bears spend their time in hollowed-out dens in tree cavities, under logs or rocks, in banks, caves, or culverts, and in shallow depressions. Although naturally-made dens are occasionally used, most dens are dug out by the bear. During their time in hibernation, an American black bear's heart rate drops from 40 to 50 beats per minute to 8 beats per minute, and the metabolic rate can drop to a quarter of the bear's (non-hibernating) basal metabolic rate. These reductions in metabolic rate and heart rate do not appear to decrease the bear's ability to heal injuries during hibernation. Their circadian rhythm stays intact during hibernation. This allows the bear to sense the changes in the day based on the ambient temperature caused by the sun's position in the sky. It has also been shown that ambient light exposure and low disturbance levels (that is to say, wild bears in ambient light conditions) directly correlate with their activity levels. The bear keeping track of the changing days allows it to awaken from hibernation at the appropriate time of year to conserve as much energy as possible.

The hibernating bear does not display the same rate of muscle and bone atrophy relative to other nonhibernatory animals that are subject to long periods of inactivity due to ailment or old age. A hibernating bear only loses approximately half the muscular strength compared to that of a well-nourished, inactive human. The bear's bone mass does not change in geometry or mineral composition during hibernation, which implies that the bear's conservation of bone mass during hibernation is caused by a biological mechanism. During hibernation American black bears retain all excretory waste, leading to the development of a hardened mass of fecal material in the colon known as a fecal plug. Leptin is released into the bear's systems to suppress appetite. The retention of waste during hibernation (specifically in minerals such as calcium) may play a role in the bear's resistance to atrophy.

Osteohistological research on the American black bear has shown that skeletal integrity during hibernation is maintained through region-specific microstructural responses, with weight-bearing limb bones retaining dense cortical organization while axial elements exhibit increased internal remodeling, consistent with differential functional demands during prolonged inactivity.

The body temperature does not drop significantly, like other mammalian hibernators (staying around 35 °C (95 °F)) and they remain somewhat alert and active. If the winter is mild enough, they may wake up and forage for food. Females also give birth in February and nurture their cubs until the snow melts. During winter, American black bears consume 25–40% of their body weight. Researchers have found that bears have adaptive reversible insulin resistance. During their fattening phase bears become hypersensitive to insulin but in the winter they switch and become more insulin resistant, as well as activating anti-inflammatory genes to resist kidney damage.

Many of the physiological changes an American black bear exhibits during hibernation are retained slightly post-hibernation. Upon exiting hibernation, bears retain a reduced heart rate and basal metabolic rate. The metabolic rate of a hibernating bear will remain at a reduced level for up to 21 days after hibernation. After emerging from their winter dens in spring, they wander their home ranges for two weeks so that their metabolism accustoms itself to the activity. In mountainous areas, they seek southerly slopes at lower elevations for forage and move to northerly and easterly slopes at higher elevations as summer progresses.

The time that American black bears emerge from hibernation varies. Factors affecting this include temperature, flooding, and hunger. In southern areas, they may wake up in midwinter. Further north, they may not be seen until late March, April, or even early May. Altitude also has an effect. Bears at lower altitudes tend to emerge earlier. Mature males tend to come out earliest, followed by immature males and females, and lastly mothers with cubs. Mothers with yearling cubs are seen before those with newborns.

=== Dietary habits ===
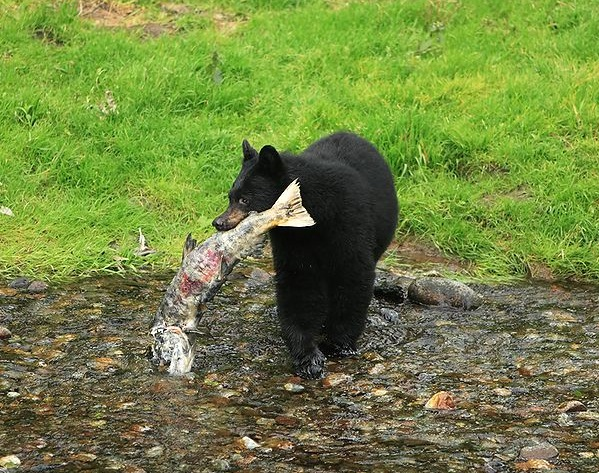
A bear taking a dead chum salmon near Hyder, Alaska

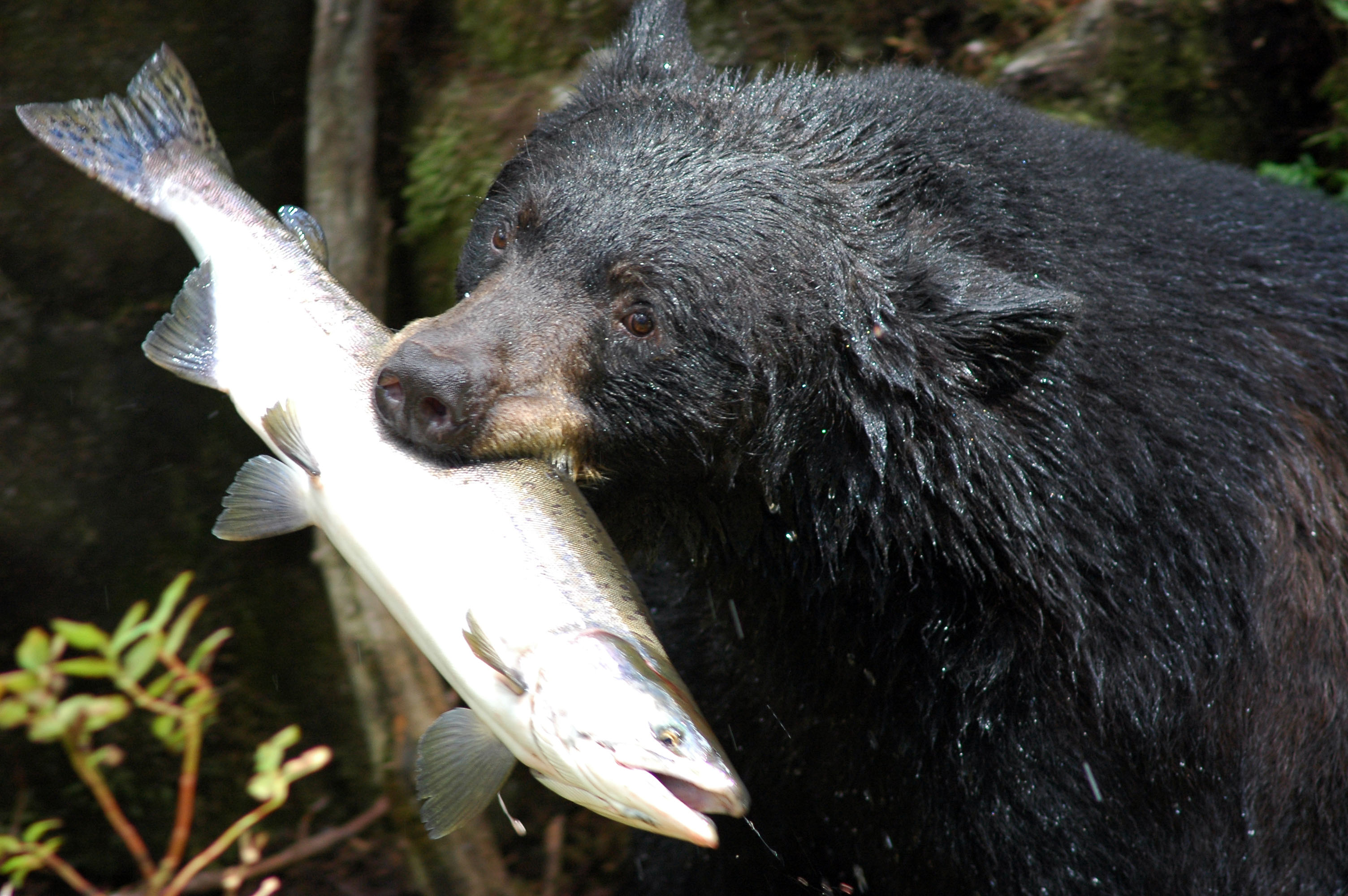
A bear with a pink salmon

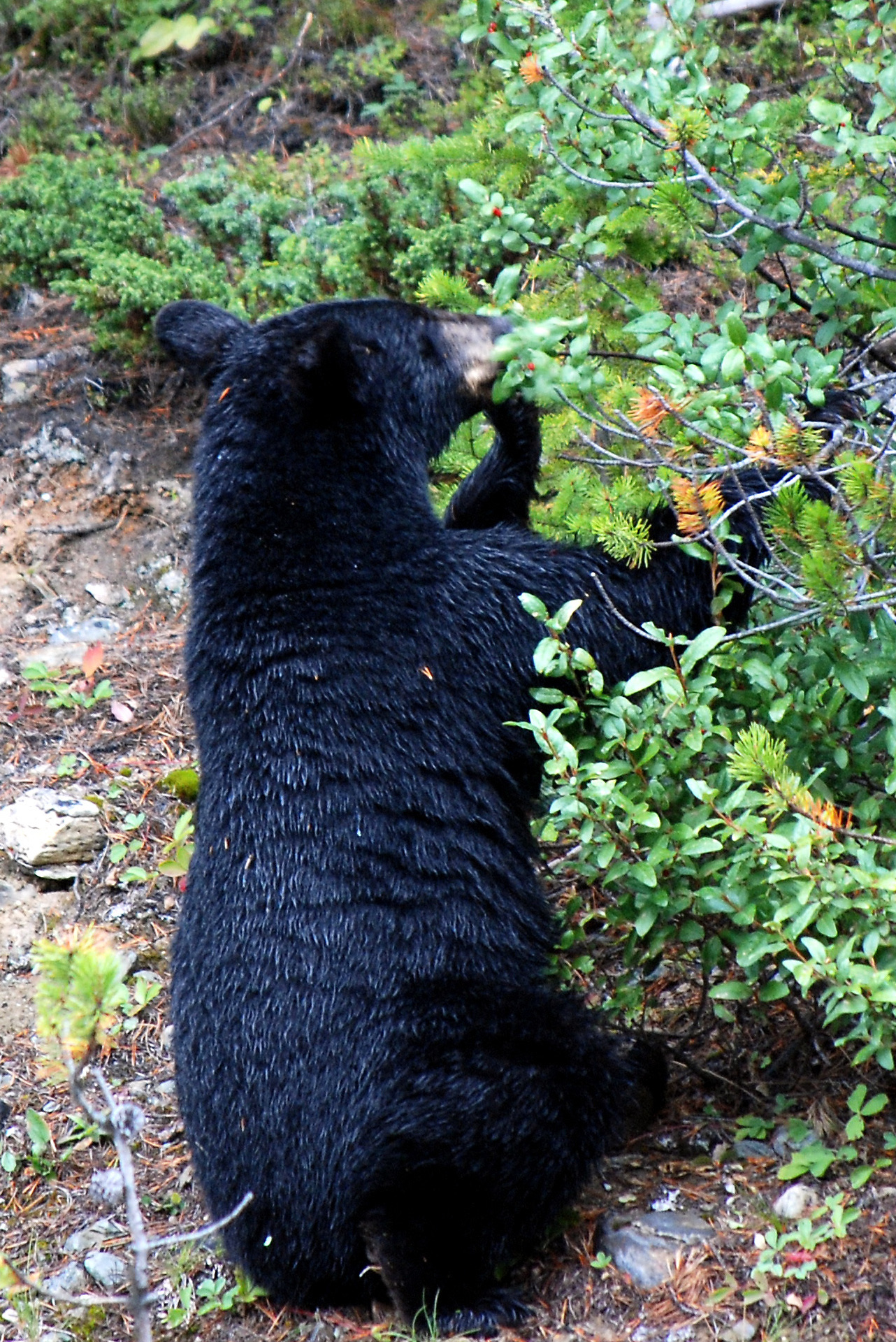
A bear feeding on a bush

Generally, American black bears are largely crepuscular in foraging activity, though they may actively feed at any time. Up to 85% of their diet consists of vegetation, though they tend to dig less than brown bears, eating far fewer roots, bulbs, corms and tubers than the latter species. When initially emerging from hibernation, they will seek to feed on carrion from winter-killed animals and newborn ungulates. As the spring temperature warms, American black bears seek new shoots of many plant species, especially new grasses, wetland plants and forbs. Young shoots and buds from trees and shrubs during the spring period are important to bears emerging from hibernation, as they assist in rebuilding muscle and strengthening the skeleton and are often the only digestible foods available at that time. During summer, the diet largely comprises fruits, especially berries and soft mast such as buds and drupes.

During the autumn hyperphagia, feeding becomes virtually the full-time task. Hard mast becomes the most important part of the diet in autumn and may even partially dictate the species' distribution. Favored mast such as hazelnuts, oak acorns and whitebark pine nuts may be consumed by the hundreds each day by a single bear during the fall. During the fall period, bears may also habitually raid the nut caches of tree squirrels. Also extremely important in fall are berries such as huckleberries and buffalo berries. Bears living in areas near human settlements or around a considerable influx of recreational human activity often come to rely on foods inadvertently provided by humans, especially during summertime. These include refuse, birdseed, agricultural products and honey from apiaries.

The majority of the animal portion of their diet consists of insects, such as bees, yellow jackets, ants, beetles and their larvae. American black bears are also fond of honey and will gnaw through trees if hives are too deeply set into the trunks for them to reach it with their paws. Once the hive is breached, the bears will scrape the honeycombs together with their paws and eat them, regardless of stings from the bees. Bears that live in northern coastal regions (especially the Pacific Coast) will fish for salmon during the night, as their black fur is easily spotted by salmon in the daytime. Other bears, such as the white-furred Kermode bears of the islands of western Canada, have a 30% greater success rate in catching salmon than their black-furred counterparts. Other fish, including suckers, trout and catfish, are readily caught whenever possible. Although American black bears do not often engage in active predation of other large animals for much of the year, the species will regularly prey on mule and white-tailed deer fawns in spring, given the opportunity. Bears may catch the scent of hiding fawns when foraging for something else and then sniff them out and pounce on them. As the fawns reach 10 days of age, they can outmaneuver the bears, and their scent is soon ignored until the next year. American black bears have also been recorded similarly preying on elk calves in Idaho and moose calves in Alaska.

Predation on adult deer is rare, but it has been recorded. They may even hunt prey up to the size of adult female moose, which are considerably larger than themselves, by ambushing them. There is at least one record of a male American black bear killing two bull elk over the course of six days by chasing them into deep snow banks, which impeded their movements. In Labrador, American black bears are exceptionally carnivorous, living largely off caribou, usually young, injured, old, sickly or dead specimens, and rodents such as voles. This is believed to be due to a paucity of edible plant life in this sub-Arctic region and a local lack of competing large carnivores (including other bear species). Like brown bears, American black bears try to use surprise to ambush their prey and target the weak, injured, sickly or dying animals in the herds. Once a deer fawn is captured, it is frequently torn apart alive while feeding. If it is able to capture a mother deer in spring, the bear frequently begins feeding on the udder of lactating females, but generally prefers meat from the viscera. Bears often drag their prey to cover, preferring to feed in seclusion. The skin of large prey is stripped back and turned inside out, with the skeleton usually left largely intact. Unlike gray wolves and coyotes, bears rarely scatter the remains of their kills. Vegetation around the carcass is usually matted down, and their droppings are frequently found nearby. Bears may attempt to cover remains of larger carcasses, though they do not do so with the same frequency as cougars and grizzly bears. They will readily consume eggs and nestlings of various birds and can easily access many tree nests, even the huge nests of bald eagles. Bears have been reported stealing deer and other game from human hunters.

=== Interspecific predatory relationships ===
Over much of their range, American black bears are assured scavengers that can intimidate, using their large size and considerable strength, and if necessary dominate other predators in confrontations over carcasses. However, on occasions where they encounter Kodiak or grizzly bears, the larger two brown subspecies dominate them. American black bears tend to escape competition from brown bears by being more active in the daytime and living in more densely forested areas. Violent interactions, resulting in the deaths of American black bears, have been recorded in Yellowstone National Park.

American black bears do occasionally compete with cougars over carcasses. Like brown bears, they will sometimes steal kills from cougars. One study found that both bear species visited 24% of cougar kills in Yellowstone and Glacier National Parks, usurping 10% of the carcasses. Another study found that American black bears visited 48% of cougar kills in summer in Colorado and 77% of kills in California. As a result, the cats spend more time killing and less time feeding on each kill.

American black bear interactions with gray wolves are much rarer than with brown bears, due to differences in habitat preferences. The majority of American black bear encounters with wolves occur in the species' northern range, with no interactions being recorded in Mexico. Despite the American black bear being more powerful on a one-to-one basis, packs of wolves have been recorded to kill black bears on numerous occasions without eating them. Unlike brown bears, American black bears frequently lose against wolves in disputes over kills. Wolf packs typically kill American black bears when the larger animals are in their hibernation cycle.

There is at least one record of an American black bear killing a wolverine (Gulo gulo) in a dispute over food in Yellowstone National Park. Anecdotal cases of alligator predation on American black bears have been reported, though such cases may involve assaults on cubs. At least one jaguar (Panthera onca) has been recorded to have attacked and eaten a black bear: "El Jefe", the jaguar famous for being the first jaguar seen in the United States in over a century.

== Relationships with humans ==
=== In folklore, mythology and culture ===
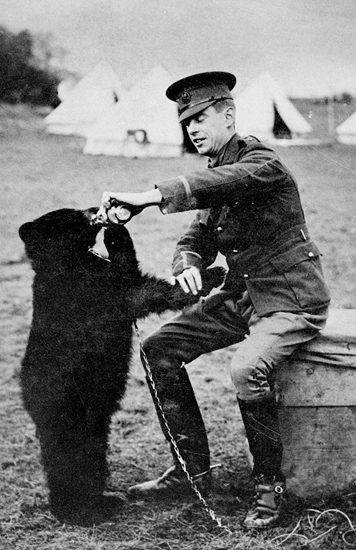
Harry Colebourn and Winnipeg, the bear from which Winnie-the-Pooh got his name

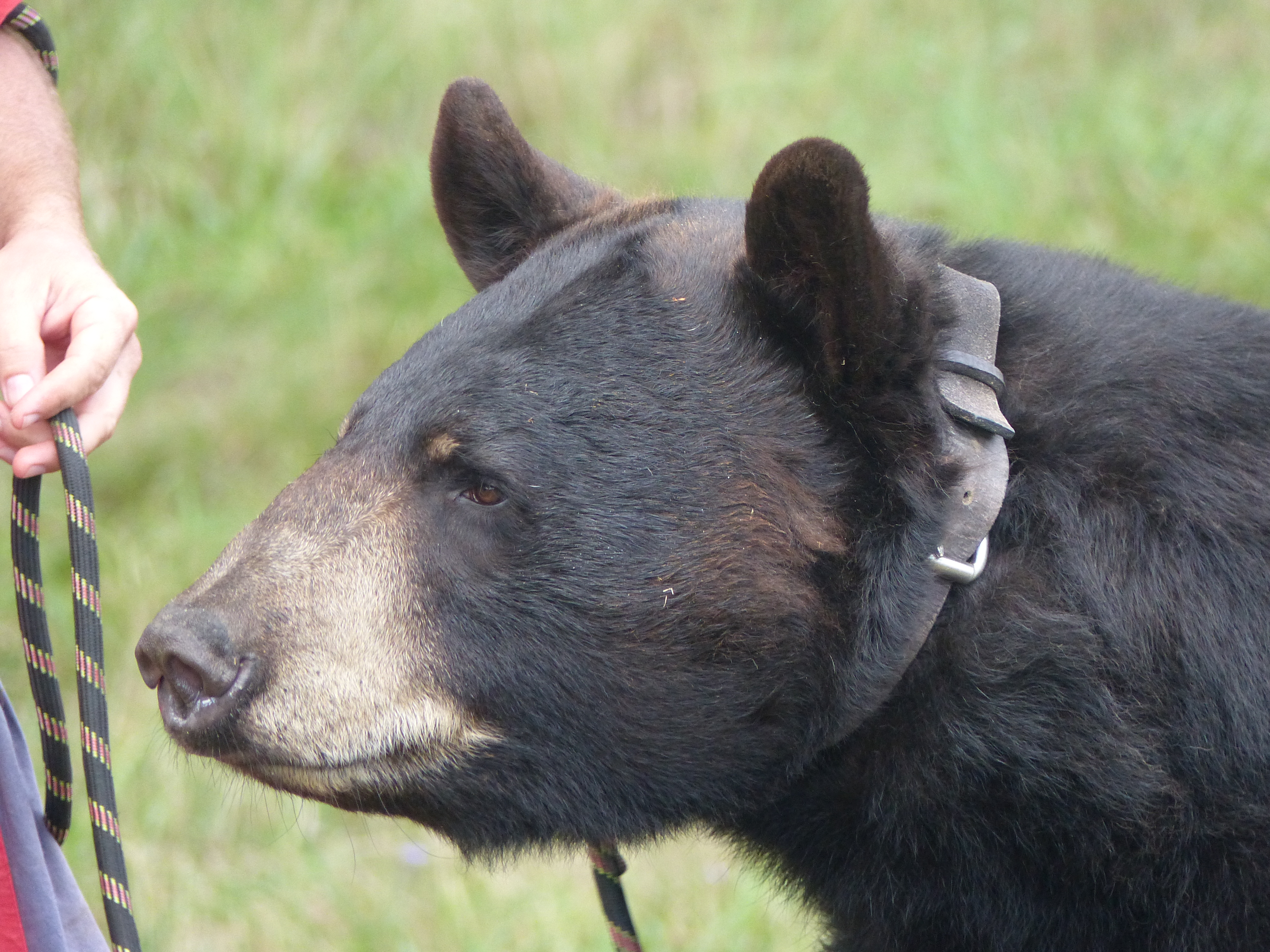
A tame bear on a leash

==== Indigenous ====
Black bears feature prominently in the stories of some of North America's indigenous peoples. One tale tells of how the black bear was a creation of the Great Spirit, while the grizzly bear was created by the Evil Spirit. In the mythology of the Haida, Tlingit and Tsimshian people of the northwest coast, mankind first learned to respect bears when a girl married the son of a black bear chieftain. In Kwakwa̱ka̱ʼwakw mythology, black and brown bears became enemies when Grizzly Bear Woman killed Black Bear Woman for being lazy. Black Bear Woman's children, in turn, killed Grizzly Bear Woman's children. The Navajo believed that the Big Black Bear was chief among the bears of the four directions surrounding Sun's house and would pray to it in order to be granted its protection during raids.

Sleeping Bear Dunes in Michigan is named after a Native American legend, where a female bear and her two cubs swam across Lake Michigan to escape a fire on the Wisconsin shore. The mother bear reached the shore and waited for her cubs, but they did not make it across. Two islands mark where the cubs drowned, while the dune marks the spot where the mother bear waited.

==== Anglo-American ====
Richard Steiff, the creator of the teddy bear, made the toy in 1902 under Margarete Steiff's felt goods company. The toys were brought to the US and gained mass popularity after a newspaper told the story of Theodore Roosevelt refusing to shoot a black bear cub tied to a tree.

The fictional character Winnie-the-Pooh was named after Winnipeg, a female cub that lived at the London Zoo from 1915 until her death in 1934.

A cub, who in the spring of 1950 was caught in the Capitan Gap Fire, was made into the living representative of Smokey Bear, the mascot of the United States Forest Service.

Terrible Ted was a de-toothed and de-clawed bear who was forced to perform as a pro wrestler and whose "career" lasted from the 1950s to the 1970s.

Clark's Bears, previously named Clark's Trading Post, is a visitor attraction in Lincoln, New Hampshire known for its trained bear shows since 1949.

The American black bear is the mascot of the University of Maine and Baylor University, the latter of which houses two live bears on campus.

=== Attacks on humans ===
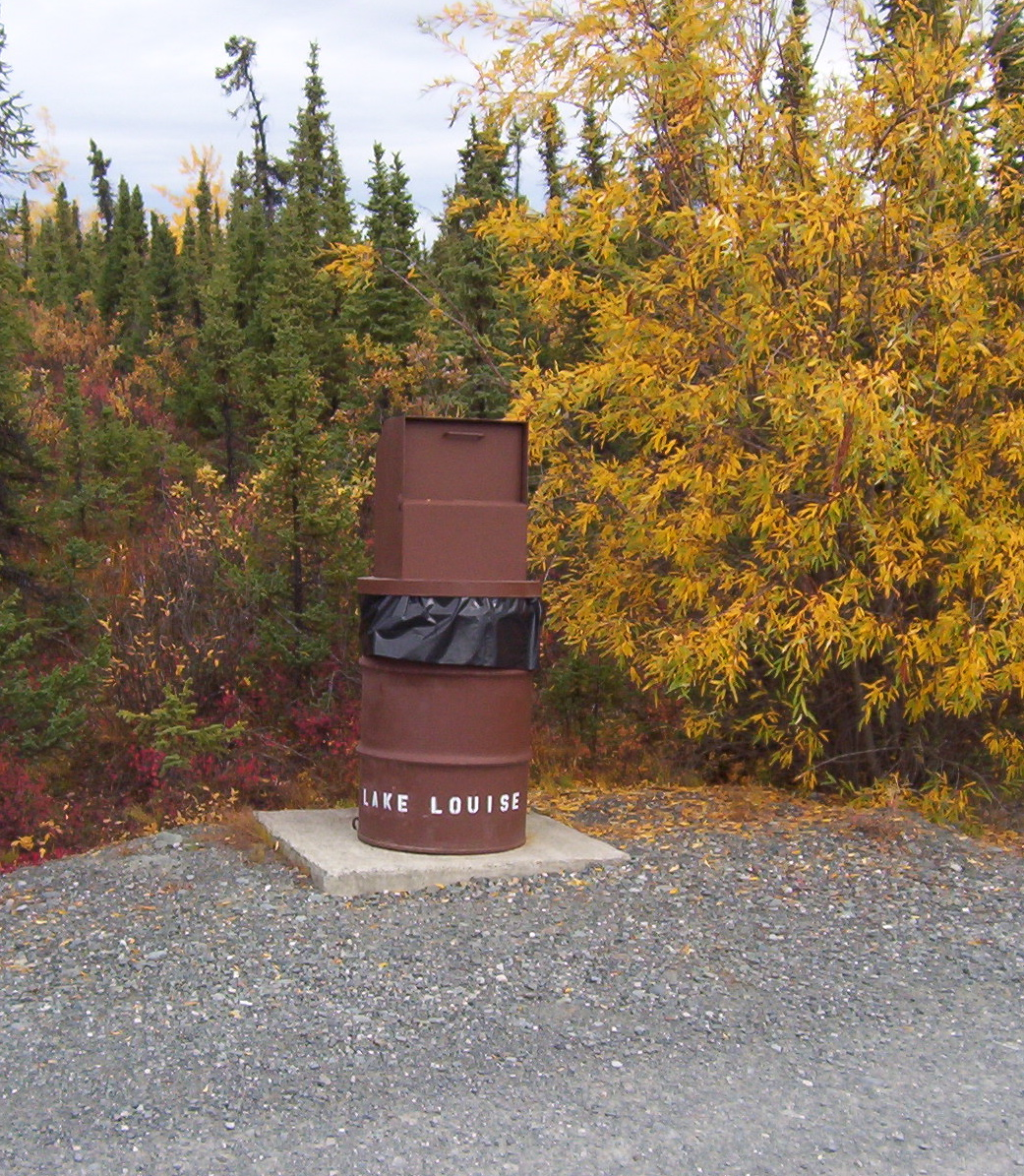
There were fewer bear attacks in parks and campgrounds after the introduction of bear-resistant garbage cans and other reforms.

Although an adult bear is quite capable of killing a human, American black bears typically avoid confronting humans. Unlike grizzly bears, which became a subject of fearsome legend among the European settlers of North America, black bears were rarely considered overly dangerous, even though they lived in areas where the pioneers had settled.

American black bears rarely attack when confronted by humans and usually only make mock charges, emit blowing noises and swat the ground with their forepaws. The number of attacks on humans is higher than those by brown bears in North America, but this is largely because black bears considerably outnumber brown bears. Compared to brown bear attacks, aggressive encounters with black bears rarely lead to serious injury. Most attacks tend to be motivated by hunger rather than territoriality and thus victims have a higher probability of surviving by fighting back rather than submitting. Unlike female brown bears, female American black bears are not as protective of their cubs and rarely attack humans in the vicinity of the cubs. However, occasionally such attacks do occur. The worst recorded attack occurred in May 1978, in which a bear killed three teenagers fishing in Algonquin Provincial Park in Ontario. Another exceptional attack occurred in August 1997 in Liard River Hot Springs Provincial Park in British Columbia, when an emaciated bear attacked a mother and child, killing the mother and a man who intervened. The bear was shot while mauling a fourth victim.

The majority of attacks happened in national parks, usually near campgrounds, where the bears had habituated too close to human proximity and food. Of 1,028 incidents of aggressive acts toward humans, recorded from 1964 to 1976 in the Great Smoky Mountains National Park, 107 resulted in injury and occurred mainly in tourist hot spots where people regularly fed the bears handouts. In almost every case where open garbage dumps that attracted bears were closed and handouts ceased, the number of aggressive encounters dropped. However, in the Liard River Hot Springs case, the bear was apparently dependent on a local garbage dump that had closed and so was starving to death. Attempts to relocate bears are typically unsuccessful, as the bears seem able to return to their home range, even without familiar landscape cues.

=== Livestock and crop predation ===
A limitation of food sources in early spring and wild berry and nut crop failures in summer may contribute to bears regularly feeding from human-based food sources. These bears often eat crops, especially during autumn hyperphagia when natural foods are scarce. Favored crops include apples, oats and corn. American black bears can do extensive damage in areas of the northwestern United States by stripping the bark from trees and feeding on the cambium. Livestock depredations occur mostly in spring.

Although they occasionally hunt adult cattle and horses, they seem to prefer smaller prey such as sheep, goats, pigs and young calves. They usually kill by biting the neck and shoulders, though they may break the neck or back of the prey with blows with the paws. Evidence of a bear attack includes claw marks and is often found on the neck, back and shoulders of larger animals. Surplus killing of sheep and goats is common. American black bears have been known to frighten livestock herds over cliffs, causing injuries and death to many animals; whether this is intentional is not known. Occasionally bears kill pets, especially domestic dogs, which are most prone to harass a bear. It is not recommended to use unleashed dogs to deter bear attacks. Although large, aggressive dogs can sometimes cause a bear to run, if pressed, angry bears often turn the tables and end up chasing the dogs in return. A bear in pursuit of a pet dog can threaten both canid and human lives.

=== Hunting ===
The hunting of American black bears has taken place since the initial peopling of the Americas. The first piece of evidence dates to a Clovis site at Lehner Ranch, Arizona. Partially calcined teeth of a 3-month old black bear cub came from a roasting pit, suggesting the bear cub was eaten. The surrounding charcoal was dated to the Early Holocene (10,940 BP). Black bear remains also appear to be associated with early peoples in Tlapacoya, Mexico. Native Americans increasingly utilized black bears during the Holocene, particularly in the late Holocene upper Midwest, e.g., Hopewell and Mississippian cultures.

Some Native American tribes, in admiration for the American black bear's intelligence, would decorate the heads of bears they killed with trinkets and place them on blankets. Tobacco smoke would be wafted into the disembodied head's nostrils by the hunter that dealt the killing blow, who would compliment the animal for its courage. The Kutchin typically hunted American black bears during their hibernation cycle. Unlike the hunting of hibernating grizzly bears, which was fraught with danger, hibernating American black bears took longer to awaken and hunting them was thus safer and easier. During the European colonization of eastern North America, thousands of bears were hunted for their meat, fat and fur. Theodore Roosevelt wrote extensively on black bear hunting in his Hunting the Grisly and other sketches, in which he stated,

in [a black bear] chase there is much excitement, and occasionally a slight spice of danger, just enough to render it attractive; so it has always been eagerly followed.

He wrote that black bears were difficult to hunt by stalking, due to their habitat preferences, though they were easy to trap. Roosevelt described how, in the southern states, planters regularly hunted bears on horseback with hounds. General Wade Hampton was known to have been present at 500 successful bear hunts, two-thirds of which he killed personally. He killed 30 or 40 bears with only a knife, which he would use to stab the bears between the shoulder blades while they were distracted by his hounds. Unless well trained, horses were often useless in bear hunts, as they often bolted when the bears stood their ground. In 1799, 192,000 American black bear skins were exported from Quebec. In 1822, 3,000 skins were exported from the Hudson's Bay Company. In 1992, untanned, fleshed and salted hides were sold for an average of $165.

In Canada, black bears are considered as both a big game and furbearer species in all provinces, save for New Brunswick and the Northwest Territories, where they are only classed as a big game species. There are around 80,900 licensed bear hunters in Canada. Canadian black bear hunts take place in the fall and spring, and both male and female bears can be legally taken, though some provinces prohibit the hunting of females with cubs, or yearlings.

Currently, 28 of the U.S. states have American black bear hunting seasons. Nineteen states require a bear hunting license, with some also requiring a big game license. In eight states, only a big game license is required. Overall, over 481,500 American black bear hunting licenses are sold per year. The hunting methods and seasons vary greatly according to state, with some bear hunting seasons including fall only, spring and fall, or year-round. New Jersey, in November 2010, approved a six-day bear-hunting season in early December 2010 to slow the growth of the population. Bear hunting had been banned in New Jersey for five years before that time. A Fairleigh Dickinson University PublicMind poll found that 53% of New Jersey voters approved of the new season if scientists concluded that bears were leaving their usual habitats and destroying private property. Men, older voters and those living in rural areas were more likely to approve of a bear hunting season in New Jersey than women, younger voters and those living in more developed parts of the state. In the western states, where there are large American black bear populations, there are spring and year-round seasons. Approximately 18,000 American black bears were killed annually in the U.S. between 1988 and 1992. Within this period, annual kills ranged from six bears in South Carolina to 2,232 in Maine. According to Dwight Schuh in his Bowhunter's Encyclopedia, American black bears are the third most popular quarry of bowhunters, behind deer and elk.

==== Meat ====
American black bear meat
Nutritional value per 100 g (3.5 oz)
- Energy: 649 kJ (155 kcal)
- Carbohydrates: 0.00 g
- Fat: 8.30 g
- Protein: 20.10 g
Vitamins and minerals
Vitamins	Quantity %DV^{†}
Vitamin A equiv.	9% 78 μg
Thiamine (B1)	13% 0.160 mg
Riboflavin (B2)	52% 0.680 mg
Niacin (B3)	20% 3.200 mg
Minerals	Quantity %DV^{†}
Iron	40% 7.20 mg
Phosphorus	13% 162 mg
- Other constituents: Quantity
- Water: 71.20 g
- ^{†}Percentages estimated using US recommendations for adults.

Bear meat had historically been held in high esteem among North America's indigenous people and colonists. American black bears were the only bear species the Kutchin hunted for their meat, though this constituted only a small part of their diet. According to the second volume of Frank Forester's Field Sports of the United States, and British Provinces, of North America:

The flesh of the [black] bear is savoury, but rather luscious, and tastes not unlike pork. It was once so common an article of food in New-York as to have given the name of Bear Market to one of the principal markets of the city.

— Frank Forester's Field Sports of the United States, and British Provinces, of North America, p. 186

Theodore Roosevelt likened the flesh of young American black bears to that of pork, and not as coarse or flavorless as the meat of grizzly bears. The most favored cuts are concentrated in the legs and loins. Meat from the neck, front legs and shoulders is usually ground into minced meat or used for stews and casseroles. Keeping the fat on tends to give the meat a strong flavor. As American black bears can have trichinosis, cooking temperatures need to be high in order to kill the parasites.

Bear fat was once valued as a cosmetic article that promoted hair growth and gloss. The fat most favored for this purpose was the hard white fat found in the body's interior. As only a small portion of this fat could be harvested for this purpose, the oil was often mixed with large quantities of hog lard. However, animal rights activism over the last decade has slowed the harvest of these animals; therefore the lard from bears has not been used in recent years for the purpose of cosmetics.

== See also ==
- List of fatal bear attacks in North America
- List of individual bears

== Sources ==
- Kruuk, Hans; Brown, Diana E. (2002). Hunter and Hunted. doi:10.1017/CBO9780511614996. ISBN 978-0-521-81410-2.
