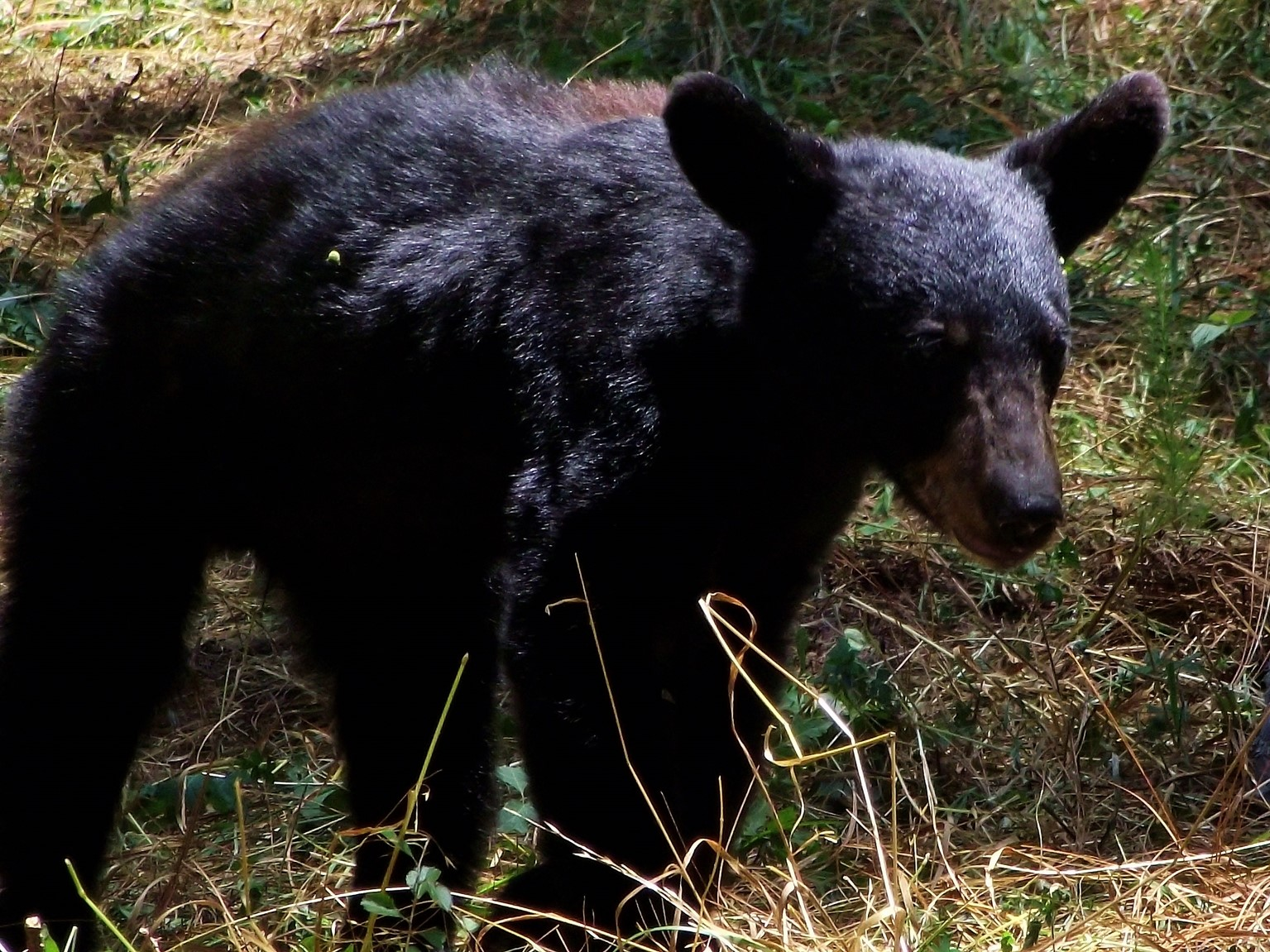

Scientific classification
- Kingdom: Animalia
- Phylum: Chordata
- Class: Mammalia
- Order: Carnivora
- Family: Ursidae
- Genus: Ursus
- Species: U. americanus
- Subspecies: U. a. emericus

Trinomial name
- Ursus americanus emericus Merriam, 1904

= East Mexican black bear =

Subspecies of bear

The East Mexican black bear (Ursus americanus emericus), often simply referred to as the Mexican black bear, is a subspecies of American black bear found in northeastern Mexico and the Texan border regions. Its fur is generally black, sometimes with brown accents and it is one of the most threatened American black bear subspecies. Though often referred to simply as the Mexican black bear, it is not to be confused with the West Mexican black bear or New Mexico black bear.

== Description ==
The Mexican black bear, like most other bears of its species, has a fur that is typically black but can have brown morphs. This subspecies is medium-sized and sexually dimorphic, with adult males generally weighing between 90–180 kg (200–400 lb) while females weigh between 45 and 110 kg (99 and 243 lb).

== Behaviour ==
=== Reproduction ===
Mating takes place in June and July, with cubs being born between January or February while the mother is winter denning. These bears have litters which usually consist of two or three cubs, which remain with their mother for approximately 18 months and during this time, the mother does not breed again.

=== Hibernation ===
Like with other black bears in relatively mild climates, and as food is still available, Mexican black bears do not truly hibernate but rather, they regularly leave and return to their winter dens or nests over a period of three to four months, from mid-December to mid-April.

== Range and habitat ==
This population is found primarily in northeastern Mexico, particularly throughout the Sierra Madre Oriental mountain range, and includes the states of Coahuila, Nuevo León, Tamaulipas and San Luis Potosí, with historical records also documenting its presence in Zacatecas and southeastern Chihuahua. The species had decreased to about 20% of its historical range by the mid-20th century. Since the turn of the millennium, researchers have documented six additional records of American black bears in Guanajuato, Querétaro and San Luis Potosí between 2000 and 2019, supporting the possibility that black bears from northeastern Mexico are moving southward along the Sierra Madre Oriental. This does not mean that they are establishing permanent breeding populations in these areas or confirm that all the individuals belong to this subspecies.

Its preferred habitats include mountainous terrain with pine forests, oak forests, scrublands and other temperate vegetation but it also does well in tropical environments (like the El Cielo Biosphere Reserve in Tamaulipas, where they were found in 2015 at an elevation of 372 m (1,220 ft)).

== Conservation ==
This bear faces several threats that have contributed to population declines and range contraction in Mexico, one of the main threats being habitat degradation (loss or fragmentation) due to deforestation for agriculture, livestock farming and human development, which reduce suitable habitat and separate bear populations. Poaching is another major threat to the species, being undertaken for trophies and parts. Human-wildlife conflict is another major issue, as human development encroaches on historic territory, bears venture out further for food leading them to farms, orchards and residential areas, potentially damaging property and crops. These encounters can result in bears being killed by people attempting to protect their livelihoods and out of fear. Poisoning and illegal wildlife trafficking have also been identified as threats in Mexican conservation reports. There is believed to be an increase in the number of bears in recent years.

== See also ==
- List of mammals of Mexico
