= Tappen (surname) =

Tappen is a surname. Notable people with the surname include:

- Abraham B. Tappen (1823–1896), American lawyer and politician
- Gerhard Tappen (1866–1953), German World War I general
- Kathryn Tappen (born 1981), NESN sportscaster
- Sarah Cornelia Tappen (d. 1800), wife of George Clinton, fourth Vice President of the United States from 1805 to 1812
