= Fecal plug =

Hardened bear feces formed during hibernation

A fecal plug (sometimes referred to as a tappen) is a significant biological phenomenon observed in bears and other animals during hibernation. It is a dense mass of hardened feces that forms in the colon due to having remained in the intestine so long that the intestinal walls have absorbed the fluids out of it, leaving it dry and hard. The plug consists of various materials ingested in the period leading up to hibernation, including undigested food, shed intestinal cells, ingested bedding materials, and even small rocks or soil particles consumed during grooming. Some plugs may include callused skin from the bear's footpads, which the bear may chew or lick during the later stages of hibernation. Popular literature sometimes repeats the speculation that bears prepare for hibernation by eating indigestible plant material to purge their digestive tracts and form a rectal plug that prevents further eating, but this is erroneous.

== See also ==
Hibernation
